= Common English Bible =

English translation of the Bible

- Full name: Common English Bible
- Abbreviation: CEB
- OT published: 2011
- NT published: 2010
- Complete Bible published: 2011
- Textual basis: NT: Nestle-Aland Greek New Testament (27th edition). OT: Biblia Hebraica Stuttgartensia (4th edition), Biblia Hebraica Quinta (5th edition) Deuterocanon/Apoc.: Göttingen Septuagint (in progress), Rahlfs-Hanhart's Septuagint (2005)
- Translation type: Mediating
- Reading level: 7.0
- Publisher: Christian Resources Development Corporation
- Copyright: Copyright 2010 Common English Bible Committee
- Genesis 1:1–3 When God began to create the heavens and the earth -- the earth was without shape or form, it was dark over the deep sea, and God's wind swept over the waters -- God said, "Let there be light." And so light appeared. John 3:16 For God so loved the world that he gave his only Son so that everyone who believes in him won't perish but will have eternal life.

The Common English Bible (CEB) is an English translation of the Bible whose language is intended to be at a comfortable reading level for the majority of English readers. The translation, sponsored by an alliance of American mainline Protestant denomination publishers, was begun in late 2008 and was finished in 2011. It generally uses gender-inclusive language in references to humans and some editions sold include the books of the Apocrypha which are used by the Catholic Church, Orthodox Church, and in some Anglican congregations.

== History ==
The Common English Bible is sponsored by an alliance of several denominational publishers in the United States operating under an umbrella group called the Christian Resources Development Corporation (CRDC), incorporated in 2009 and based in Nashville, Tennessee. The publishing houses participating are Chalice Press (Disciples of Christ), Westminster John Knox Press (Presbyterian Church U.S.A.), Church Publishing Inc (Episcopal Church), Pilgrim Press (United Church of Christ), and Abingdon Press (United Methodist Church). According to the CEB's preface, the motivation for producing a new translation was that "it has proved difficult to combine concern for accuracy and accessibility in one translation that the typical reader or worshipper would be able to understand." One hundred twenty scholars from twenty-four different denominations worked on the translation.

== Textual basis ==
The CEB New Testament was translated from the Nestle-Aland Greek New Testament (27th Edition), a standard edition of the Greek used in many versions of the Christian scriptures. For the Old Testament various editions of the traditional Masoretic Text were used: the Biblia Hebraica Stuttgartensia (4th edition), Biblia Hebraica Quinta (5th edition), and in some cases the Hebrew University Bible Project. However, as with many modern Bibles, the Old Testament was occasionally emended using readings from the Dead Sea Scrolls, the ancient Septuagint Greek translation, and other sources.

For the Apocrypha, the currently unfinished Göttingen Septuagint was used as the basis. Books that were not available in the Göttingen project were translated from the latest revision of Rahlfs' Septuagint (2006). Surviving Hebrew manuscripts of some Septuagint books were consulted as well.

== Translation methodology ==
The CEB uses a balance of dynamic equivalence and formal equivalence translation principles. Ease of comprehension was measured using the standard Dale–Chall Readability Formula so a seventh grade reading level could be attained. The translators' goal is to produce a rendering of the Bible at the same reading level as the USA Today newspaper.

Portions of scripture were assigned to each of the 120 translators. Each produced a draft translation which was then reviewed and modified by a co-translator. The resulting text was then sent to one of 77 "reading groups", teams of five to ten non-specialists that read it out loud and noted awkward translations. The rendering, along with suggestions for improvement, was then sent to a readability editor to check style and grammar, followed by a complete review by the editor for that section of the Bible. The text was then put before the entire editorial board which resolved any lingering controversies and ensured consistency throughout the entire Bible translation.

The translators include Tremper Longman, Luke Timothy Johnson, David L. Petersen, Joel B. Green, Brent A. Strawn, Melody D. Knowles, Beverly Gaventa, Gail O'Day, Cynthia Westfall, and Emerson B. Powery. Protestant, Catholic, Seventh-day Adventist and Reform Judaism were represented among the translators and reviewers.

=== Features ===
The CEB attempts to substitute more natural wording for traditional biblical terminology. Notably, where most Bibles use the term "son of man" in the Old Testament (e.g. Ezekiel 2:8), the CEB translates this as "human one" or "human being". In the New Testament where Jesus uses the Greek version of this term of himself—with messianic overtones—the CEB renders it as "the Human One".

Contractions are used more frequently in the Common English Bible than in more formally equivalent translations. For example, the New Revised Standard Version renders Luke 12:7 as, "But even the hairs of your head are all counted. Do not be afraid; you are of more value than many sparrows." The CEB has, "Even the hairs on your head are all counted. Don't be afraid. You are worth more than many sparrows."

The maps of biblical lands in the Common English Bible were produced by the National Geographic Society.

The full Common English Bible, both Old and New Testaments and the Apocrypha, can be accessed for passage lookup online at the CEB website.

== Circulation ==
The CEB was finished in 2011 and a marketing campaign was begun in late 2009. As part of the campaign, free copies of the Gospels of Luke, Matthew, the Book of Genesis and the Book of Psalms are being offered for download in .pdf format. Short audio recordings of various scriptures have also been posted. Until July 31, 2010, a free printed copy of the entire New Testament was also being offered by mail. Today, a free sampler of the Gospel of Mark (full) is offered in PDF.

In April 2011 Fuller Theological Seminary, an evangelical school catering to many denominations, selected the CEB as one of two approved Bible translations for Biblical studies courses, replacing the discontinued Today's New International Version.

The Common English Bible is one of the versions authorized for use in services of The Episcopal Church.
