= Hebrew Bible: A Critical Edition =

To be published by Oxford University Press

The Hebrew Bible: A Critical Edition, formerly known as the Oxford Hebrew Bible, is an in-progress critical edition of the Hebrew Bible (also known as the Old Testament, Tanakh, Mikra, or Jewish Bible) to be published by Oxford University Press.

== Edition ==
The chief editor is Ronald Hendel of the University of California, Berkeley, with editors from all over the world. Unlike the older Biblia Hebraica Stuttgartensia, Biblia Hebraica Quinta and Hebrew University Bible, all of which represent diplomatic editions, the Oxford Hebrew Bible represents an eclectic text. The edition also includes introductory material describing textual issues, and thorough commentary. Each book of the Hebrew Bible is treated individually, only with consistency in presentation between books, on the belief that the Hebrew Scriptures do not have unity in origin nor transmission.

Hendel says the production of an eclectic text, which is sought as the "earliest inferable text", will offer to readers similar benefits that such texts have given to readers of the New Testament, as in the Novum Testamentum Graece and Editio Critica Maior, or of the Septuagint, as in Alfred Rahlfs' manual edition and The Göttingen Septuagint. Others have criticised the project, on grounds including that the Hebrew Scriptures are sufficiently different from others such that an eclectic text is inappropriate. Hendel has sought to respond to criticisms.

The first volume of this series, Proverbs: An Eclectic Edition with Introduction and Textual Commentary by Michael V. Fox was published in April 2015 by the Society of Biblical Literature.

In addition, samples from Genesis, Leviticus, Deuteronomy, 1 and 2 Kings, Jeremiah, and Ezekiel, have been produced.

== See also ==
- Hebrew Old Testament Text Project
- Hebrew University Bible Project
