= Gérard E. Weil =

French Hebraist and biblical scholar

- Born: 5 November 1926; Strasbourg
- Died: 28 October 1986 (aged 59); Lyon

Academic work
- Discipline: Biblical criticism
- Institutions: Université Nancy-II; Université Lyon-III
- Main interests: Masoretic Text
- Notable works: Biblia Hebraica Stuttgartensia

Gérard Emmanuel Weil (born 1926 in Strasbourg; died October 1986 in Lyon) was a French Hebraist and biblical scholar.

He was professor at Université Nancy-II and later at Université Lyon-III, where he was the manager of the Centre d'analyse et de traitement automatique de la Bible (CATAB). His research field was the Masoretic Text of the Hebrew Bible.

He has published at :

- CNRS Editions
- Pontifical Biblical Institute
- German Bible Society (as an editor of the Masoretic Text)
- Brill Publishers

== Publications (selection) ==
- Massorah gedolah; Iuxta codicem Leringradensem B19a; elaboravit ediditque Gérard E. Weil; Romae : Pontificium Inst. Biblicum [u.a.], 1971 (Einheitssachtitel: Masora. – Mit Parallelt. in franz. u. hebr. Sprache. – Nebensacht.: Masora magna. – Text hebr., Einleitung franz. u. hebr.).
- Biblia Hebraica Stuttgartensia; textum masoreticum curavit H. P. Rüger. Masoram elaboravit G. E. Weil. Editio secunda emendata opera W. Rudolph et H. P. Rüger; Rudolph, W [Hrsg.]; Stuttgart : Deutsche Bibelgesellschaft, 1984.
- Elie Lévita; humaniste et massorète (1469–1549); Verf.: Gérard E. Weil; Leiden : Brill, 1963 (Schriftenreihe Studia post-biblica ; 7; Umfang XXIII, 428 S.).
- Initiation à la Massorah; l'introduction au Séphèr Zikhronōt d' Elie Lévita; Gérard E. Weil; Leiden : Brill, 1964.
- Titel La bibliothèque de Gersonide; d'après son catalogue autographe; Gérard E. Weil; Louvain {[u.a.] : Peeters, 1991 (Schriftenreihe Collection de la Revue des études juives ; [10]).
- Concordance de la cantilation; Weil, Gérard E.; Rivière, P.; Paris : Ed. du CNRS, 1978 (Schriftenreihe Documentation de la Bible ; 1).
