= New English Translation of the Septuagint =

Translation of the Septuagint

- New Translation Of The Septuagint, OUP First Edition Cover
- Full name: New English Translation of the Septuagint and the Other Greek Translations Traditionally Included under That Title
- Abbreviation: NETS
- Language: English
- Complete Bible published: 2007
- Authorship: Numerous
- Textual basis: Göttingen Septuagint (primary), Rahlfs' Septuagint
- Revision: 2009, 2014, 2021
- Website: https://ccat.sas.upenn.edu/nets/
- Genesis 1:1–3 In the beginning God made the sky and the earth. Yet the earth was invisible and unformed, and darkness was over the abyss, and a divine wind was being carried along over the water. And God said, “Let light come into being.” And light came into being.

The New English Translation of the Septuagint and the Other Greek Translations Traditionally Included under That Title (NETS) is a modern translation of the Septuagint (LXX), that is the scriptures used by Greek-speaking Christians and Jews of antiquity. The translation was sponsored by the International Organization for Septuagint and Cognate Studies (IOSCS). The Psalms were published in 2000 and the complete Septuagint in 2007.

== Development ==
The NETS translators selected the best critical editions of the Septuagint, primarily the larger Göttingen Septuagint (as far as it was completed at the time of translation) and Alfred Rahlfs' manual edition for the books still missing from the Göttingen edition. The text was not rendered into a brand new translation; instead, the translators revised the New Revised Standard Version (NRSV), altering it to match the wording of the Greek and removing gender-inclusive language that was not warranted by the underlying source texts. It was hoped the relationship between the NETS and the NRSV would mirror the relationship between the LXX and its underlying Hebrew text, making it easy for readers to study the discrepancies between the two textual traditions without extensive study of the original languages. Corrections and emendations were made to the work in 2009, 2014, and 2021.

== The Committees ==
Two committees are listed for NETS, the Advisory Committee and the Editorial Committee. The Advisory Committee consists of four individuals: Jan de Waard, Bruce Metzger, Emanuel Tov, and John W. Wevers. The Editorial Committee consists of Dave Aiken, Cameron Boyd-Taylor, Dirk Buchner, Leonard Greenspoon, Rob Hiebert, Fritz Knobloch, Robert A. Kraft, Al Pietersma (co-chair), Moisés Silva, Bernard Taylor, Jay Treat, Ben Wright (co-chair).
