= Alfred Rahlfs' edition of the Septuagint =

Septuaginta: id est Vetus Testamentum Graece iuxta LXX interpretes
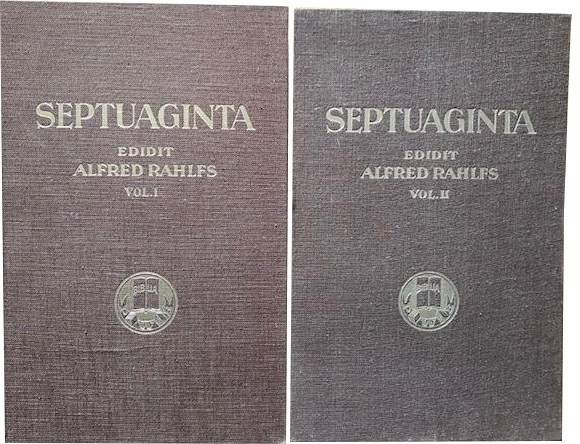
- 1935 original edition of the 2 volumes of Alfred Rahlfs' edition of the Septuagint
- Author: Alfred Rahlfs
- Language: Koine Greek
- Published: 1935
- Publication place: Germany
- Original text: Septuaginta: id est Vetus Testamentum Graece iuxta LXX interpretes at Greek Wikisource

Alfred Rahlfs' edition of the Septuagint, sometimes called Rahlfs' Septuagint or Rahlfs' Septuaginta, is a critical edition of the Septuagint published for the first time in 1935 by the German philologist Alfred Rahlfs. This edition is the most widespread edition of the Septuagint.

The full title of this edition is: Septuaginta: id est Vetus Testamentum Graece iuxta LXX interpretes; this edition was first published in 1935, in 2 volumes, by the Deutsche Bibelgesellschaft, in Stuttgart. Many reprints were made later.

The name of the 2006 revision is known as the Rahlfs-Hanhart, after the revisor Robert Hanhart.

== Main codices used ==
In his edition, Rahlfs used mainly three codices to establish the text: Vaticanus, Sinaiticus and Alexandrinus, with the Vaticanus as the "leading manuscript".

== Revision ==
In 2006, Robert Hanhart edited a revised version of the text, known as the "Editio altera", or "Rahlfs-Hanhart".

The text of this revised edition contains changes in the diacritics. Otherwise it alters the wording of the main Greek text only in Isaiah 5:17 and 53:2, where two words "unanimously transmitted" in the LXX manuscripts have been replaced with conjectural emendations (Is 5:17 ἀπειλημμένων "of those taken" is replaced with ἀπηλειμμένων "of those expunged", and Is 53:2 ἀνηγγείλαμεν "we reported" is replaced with ἀνέτειλε μέν "he rose indeed").

== See also ==
- Roman Septuagint
- Septuaginta: Vetus Testamentum Graecum
