= Robert Hanhart =

Swiss Protestant theologian (1925–2025)

- Born: 6 July 1925; St. Gallen, Switzerland
- Died: 11 July 2025 (aged 100); Göttingen, Lower Saxony, Germany

Academic background
- Education: University of Basel; University of Göttingen

Academic work
- Discipline: Theology
- Institutions: Faculty of Theology, University of Göttingen; Göttingen Academy of Sciences and Humanities
- Main interests: Septuagint
- Notable works: Studien zur Septuaginta und zum hellenistischen Judentum

Robert Hanhart (6 July 1925 – 11 July 2025) was a Swiss Protestant theologian known for his scholarship of the Septuagint, the Greek version of the Jewish scriptures. He was a professor emeritus of the Old Testament at the Faculty of Theology, University of Göttingen and served as the director of the Göttinger Septuaginta-Unternehmen (Göttingen Septuagint Company), an institute of the Göttingen Academy of Sciences and Humanities dedicated to creating critical editions of works of the Septuagint.

== Biography ==
Robert Hanhart was born in St. Gallen, Switzerland on 6 July 1925. He studied classical philology and classical history at the University of Basel. Hanhart earned his doctorate in 1954. He first worked for a year at Mittellateinisches Wörterbuch, a project to create a medieval Latin dictionary. He then moved to the Göttingen Academy of Sciences and Humanities in Germany, where he worked as a research assistant at the Göttinger Septuaginta-Unternehmen. The first book released under his editorship was a 1959 critical edition of the book 2 Maccabees in its Greek Septuagint form which he had taken over from the work of Werner Kappler. In 1961, he was appointed head of the department. In 1962 he received a doctorate in theology from the Faculty of Theology, University of Göttingen. He completed a habilitation in 1965 with his thesis being his edition of the Book of Esther; this allowed him to be appointed an adjunct professor of the Old Testament at Göttingen in 1967. In 1977, he became a full professor. He took emeritus status and retired from his professorship in 1990, and retired as director of the Septuagint Company in 1993. However, he continued to work in the field, writing the book Studien zur Septuaginta und zum hellenistischen Judentum in 1999 and providing forwards, commentary, and editorship for other projects.

Hanhart received honorary degrees from both the University of Helsinki's theology department as well as the University of Bologna in recognition of his work on the Septuagint.

Hanhart turned 100 on 6 July 2025, and died five days later, on 11 July.

== Works ==
Books

- with Reinhard Gregor Kratz: Studien zur Septuaginta und zum hellenistischen Judentum. Tübingen 1999.

Festschrift

- Fraenkel, D.; Wevers, J. W. (1990). Udo Quast (ed.). Studien zur Septuaginta – Robert Hanhart zu Ehren. Aus Anlaß seines 65. Geburtstages (in German). Göttingen.

Editor

- Vetus Testamentum Graecum auctoritate Academiae Scientiarum Gottingensis editum. Vol IX,2: Maccabaeorum liber II. Göttingen 1959. 2nd edition 1976, 3rd edition 2008. (2 Maccabees)
- Vetus Testamentum Graecum auctoritate Academiae Scientiarum Gottingensis editum. Vol IX,3: Maccabaeorum liber III. Göttingen 1960. 2nd edition 1980. (3 Maccabees)
- Vetus Testamentum Graecum auctoritate Academiae Scientiarum Gottingensis editum. Vol VIII,3: Esther. Göttingen 1966. 2nd edition 1983. (Esther)
- Vetus Testamentum Graecum auctoritate Academiae Scientiarum Gottingensis editum. Vol VIII,1: Esdrae liber I. Göttingen 1974. 2nd edition 1991. (1 Esdras)
- Vetus Testamentum Graecum auctoritate Academiae Scientiarum Gottingensis editum. Vol VIII,4: Iudith. Göttingen 1979. (Book of Judith)
- Vetus Testamentum Graecum auctoritate Academiae Scientiarum Gottingensis editum. Vol VIII,5: Tobit. Göttingen 1983. (Book of Tobit)
- Vetus Testamentum Graecum auctoritate Academiae Scientiarum Gottingensis editum. Vol VIII,2: Esdrae liber II. Göttingen 1993. (2 Esdras)
- Vetus Testamentum Graecum auctoritate Academiae Scientiarum Gottingensis editum. Vol VII,2: Paralipomenon liber II. Göttingen 2014. (2 Chronicles)

Articles

- Das Bild der Jeanne d’Arc in der französischen Historiographie des Spätmittelalters bis zur Aufklärung. Basel 1955 (Dissertation)
- Zum Text des 2. und 3. Makkabäerbuches. Göttingen 1961 (Mitteilungen des Septuaginta-Unternehmens 7; auch als Dissertation, Göttingen 1962)
- Drei Studien zum Judentum. Munich 1967
- Sacharja. Neukirchen-Vluyn 1990 (Biblischer Kommentar zum Alten Testament)
- Ein unbekannter Text zur griechischen Esra-Überlieferung. Göttingen 1995 (Mitteilungen des Septuaginta-Unternehmens 22)
- Text und Textgeschichte des 2. Esrabuches. Göttingen 2003 (Mitteilungen des Septuaginta-Unternehmens 25)
