= Septuaginta: Vetus Testamentum Graecum =

Critical edition of the Old Testament

- Author: Göttingen Academy of Sciences and Humanities
- Language: Koine Greek
- Publisher: Vandenhoeck & Ruprecht
- Publication date: TBD
- Publication place: Germany

The Septuaginta: Vetus Testamentum Graecum (Note: It is also common to see the fuller version of the series title and subtitle: Septuaginta: Vetus Testamentum Graecum, auctoritate Academiae Scientiarum Gottingensis editum) (SVTG), also known as the Göttingen Septuagint, is a critical edition of the Greek Old Testament (Septuagint) prepared by the Göttingen Academy of Sciences and Humanities and published by Vandenhoeck & Ruprecht.

The project was founded by Alfred Rahlfs in 1908, and continues under the direction of Reinhard G. Kratz and Felix Albrecht. As of February 2025, 26 volumes have been published (out of 36 total). The project is about 75% complete, and work on each of the remaining 10 volumes is in progress.

== History ==
Since the early twentieth century, preparation of the major critical edition of the Septuagint has been centered in Göttingen, Germany. From its inception, the project's goal was to produce a comprehensive critical, eclectic edition of the entire corpus of Koine Greek translations known as the Septuagint (LXX). The task of each SVTG volume is thus to reconstruct the oldest attainable text version (i.e., before its later recensions) of a given book in a critical edition and to document its transmission as thoroughly as possible. (Note: A critical edition of the Septuagint (i.e., the Old Greek) may be described as "a collection of the oldest recoverable texts, carefully restored book by book (or section by section), aiming at achieving the closest approximation to the original translations (from Hebrew or Aramaic) or compositions (in Greek), systematically reconstructed from the widest array of relevant textual data (including controlled conjecture).") The vision for the project stretches back to the approach to study of the LXX initiated by Paul Anton de Lagarde (1827–1891), who had hoped to himself produce a full eclectic edition, but ultimately fell far short.

Work on the Göttingen Septuagint officially began in 1908 with the project initiated by Lagarde's disciple, Alfred Rahlfs (1851–1913), supported by Rudolf Smend and Julius Wellhausen, and the founding of the Septuaginta-Unternehmen ('Septuagint Company') of the Göttingen Academy of Sciences and Humanities (German: Akademie der Wissenschaften zu Göttingen). From 1908 to 2015, the responsibility for producing a complete critical edition of the LXX belonged to the Septuaginta-Unternehmen. The project was led by six scholars over the course of its duration: Rahlfs (1908–1933), Werner Kappler (1933–1944), Emil Große-Brauckmann (1952–1961), Robert Hanhart (1961–1993), Anneli Aejmelaeus (1993–2000), and Bernhard Neuschäfer (2005–2015). During this period, 24 volumes of the SVTG were published, covering the Pentateuch, prophetic books, most of the deuterocanonical books, and a handful of others. In 2015, the funding for the Septuaginta-Unternehmen expired, and it officially closed.

Following the close of the Septuaginta-Unternehmen, the Göttingen Academy of Sciences and Humanities established another commission in 2016 to carry on the task of editing and producing the Göttingen Septuagint: the Kommission zur Edition und Erforschung der Septuaginta ('Commission for the Edition and Research of the Septuagint'), directed by Reinhard G. Kratz and Felix Albrecht. The Commission officially ran from 2016 to 2019, and resulted in the publication of two new editions and a number of revised printings of earlier volumes. From 2020 onwards, the production of the remaining books in the SVTG project has been conducted by the Robert Hanhart Foundation (Robert Hanhart-Stiftung zur Förderung der Septuaginta-Forschung), presided over by Kratz.

In 2020, a new long-term project of the Academy was established: the 'Editio critica maior' des griechischen Psalters ('Major Critical Edition of the Greek Psalter'). (Note: See the project website: https://septuaginta.uni-goettingen.de/) It officially began on January 1, 2020, and is scheduled to run for 21 years. As a product of its larger aim of exploring the complex and extensive tradition and textual history of the Greek Psalter, the project will culminate in the publication of a new critical edition of the Psalms and Odes for the Göttingen SVTG series. This will replace the outdated and inadequate 1931 edition by Rahlfs. The critically-reconstructed text will be provided in a hybrid format—both as a printed book and an online edition.

== Volumes ==
=== Published ===
- Wevers, John William, ed. (1974), Genesis, SVTG 1, Göttingen: Vandenhoeck & Ruprecht, ISBN 978-3-525-53391-8
- ———, ed. (1991), Exodus, SVTG 2.1, Göttingen: Vandenhoeck & Ruprecht, ISBN 978-3-525-53445-8
- ———, ed. (1986), Leviticus, SVTG 2.2, Göttingen: Vandenhoeck & Ruprecht, ISBN 978-3-525-53444-1
- ———, ed. (1982), Numeri, SVTG 3.1, Göttingen: Vandenhoeck & Ruprecht, ISBN 978-3-525-53441-0
  - 2nd edition: 2019
- ———, ed. (1977), Deuteronomium, SVTG 3.2, Göttingen: Vandenhoeck & Ruprecht, ISBN 978-3-525-53410-6
  - 2nd edition: 2006
- Quast, Udo, ed. (2006), Ruth, SVTG 4.3, Göttingen: Vandenhoeck & Ruprecht, ISBN 978-3-525-53448-9
  - 2nd edition: 2009
- Hanhart, Robert, ed. (2014), Paralipomenon Liber II, SVTG 7.2, Göttingen: Vandenhoeck & Ruprecht, ISBN 978-3-525-53449-6
- ———, ed. (1974), Esdrae Liber I, SVTG 8.1, Göttingen: Vandenhoeck & Ruprecht, ISBN 978-3-525-53399-4
  - 2nd edition: 1991
- ———, ed. (1993), Esdrae Liber II, SVTG 8.2, Göttingen: Vandenhoeck & Ruprecht, ISBN 978-3-525-53400-7
  - 2nd edition: 2017
- ———, ed. (1966), Esther, SVTG 8.3, Göttingen: Vandenhoeck & Ruprecht, ISBN 978-3-525-53402-1
  - 2nd edition: 1983
- ———, ed. (1979), Iudith, SVTG 8.4, Göttingen: Vandenhoeck & Ruprecht, ISBN 978-3-525-53438-0
- ———, ed. (1983), Tobit, SVTG 8.5, Göttingen: Vandenhoeck & Ruprecht, ISBN 978-3-525-53442-7
- Kappler, Werner, ed. (1936), Maccabaeorum Liber I, SVTG 9.1, Göttingen: Vandenhoeck & Ruprecht, ISBN 978-3-525-53404-5
  - 2nd edition: 1967; 3rd edition: 1990
- Hanhart, Robert, ed. (1959), Maccabaeorum Liber II, SVTG 9.2, Göttingen: Vandenhoeck & Ruprecht, ISBN 978-3-525-53432-8
  - 2nd edition: 1976; 3rd edition: 2008; 4th edition: 2017
- ———, ed. (1960), Maccabaeorum Liber III, SVTG 9.3, Göttingen: Vandenhoeck & Ruprecht, ISBN 978-3-525-53433-5
  - 2nd edition: 1980
- Rahlfs, Alfred, ed. (1931), Psalmi cum Odis, SVTG 10, Göttingen: Vandenhoeck & Ruprecht, ISBN 978-3-525-53412-0
  - 2nd edition: 1967; 3rd edition: 1979
  - Replaced by Rahlfs, Alfred, ed. (2025), Psalmi cum Odis, with a supplement by Felix Albrecht, SVTG 13 (4th ed.), Göttingen: Vandenhoeck & Ruprecht, ISBN 978-3-525-50225-9
- Gentry, Peter J., ed. (2019), Ecclesiastes, SVTG 11.2, Göttingen: Vandenhoeck & Ruprecht, ISBN 978-3-525-53427-4
- Ziegler, Joseph, ed. (1982), Iob, SVTG 11.4, Göttingen: Vandenhoeck & Ruprecht, ISBN 978-3-525-53415-1
- ———, ed. (1962), Sapientia Salomonis, SVTG 12.1, Göttingen: Vandenhoeck & Ruprecht, ISBN 978-3-525-53417-5
  - 2nd edition: 1980; 3rd edition: 2017
- ———, ed. (1965), Sapientia Iesu Filii Sirach, SVTG 12.2, Göttingen: Vandenhoeck & Ruprecht, ISBN 978-3-525-53419-9
  - 2nd edition:1980; 3rd edition: 2015
- Albrecht, Felix, ed. (2018), Psalmi Solomonis, SVTG 12.3, Göttingen: Vandenhoeck & Ruprecht, ISBN 978-3-525-53450-2
- Ziegler, Joseph, ed. (1943), Duodecim Prophetae, SVTG 13, Göttingen: Vandenhoeck & Ruprecht, ISBN 978-3-525-53421-2
  - 2nd edition: 1967; 3rd edition: 1984; 4th edition: 2016
  - Replaced by Albrecht, Felix, ed. (2024), Duodecim Prophetae, SVTG 13 (5th, completely revised ed.), Göttingen: Vandenhoeck & Ruprecht, ISBN 978-3-525-53472-4
- Ziegler, Joseph, ed. (1939), Isaias, SVTG 14, Göttingen: Vandenhoeck & Ruprecht, ISBN 978-3-525-53424-3
  - 2nd edition: 1967; 3rd edition: 1983
- ———, ed. (1957), Ieremias, Baruch, Threni, Epistula Ieremiae, SVTG 15, Göttingen: Vandenhoeck & Ruprecht, ISBN 978-3-525-53426-7
  - 2nd edition: 1976; 3rd edition: 2005; 4th edition: 2013
- ———, ed. (1952), Ezechiel, SVTG 16.1, Göttingen: Vandenhoeck & Ruprecht, ISBN 978-3-525-53435-9
  - 2nd edition: 1978; 3rd edition: 2006; 4th edition: 2015
  - Supplement: ———, ed. (1978), Ezechiel: Nachtrag, SVTG 16.1N, Göttingen: Vandenhoeck & Ruprecht, ISBN 978-3-525-53436-6
- ———, ed. (1954), Susanna, Daniel, Bel et Draco, SVTG 16.2, Göttingen: Vandenhoeck & Ruprecht, ISBN 978-3-525-53446-5
  - 2nd edition: 1999 (partially revised by Olivier Munnich and Detlef Fraenkel)

=== In progress ===
- Cañas Reíllo, José Manuel (ed.), Iosue, SVTG 4.1, Göttingen: Vandenhoeck & Ruprecht
- ——— (ed.), Iudices, SVTG 4.2, Göttingen: Vandenhoeck & Ruprecht
- Aejmelaeus, Anneli (ed.), Regnorum Liber I (Samuelis I), SVTG 5.1, Göttingen: Vandenhoeck & Ruprecht
- Kauhanen, Tuukka (ed.), Regnorum Liber II (Samuelis II), SVTG 5.2, Göttingen: Vandenhoeck & Ruprecht
- Trebolle Barrera, Julio; Torijano, Pablo A. (eds.), Regnorum Liber III (Regum I), SVTG 6.1, Göttingen: Vandenhoeck & Ruprecht
- ———; ——— (eds.), Regnorum Liber IV (Regum II), SVTG 6.2, Göttingen: Vandenhoeck & Ruprecht
- Janz, Timothy (ed.), Paralipomenon Liber I, SVTG 7.1, Göttingen: Vandenhoeck & Ruprecht
- Hiebert, Robert J. V. (ed.), Maccabaeorum Liber IV, SVTG 9.4, Göttingen: Vandenhoeck & Ruprecht
- Albrecht, Felix (ed.), Psalmi cum Odis, SVTG 10, Göttingen: Vandenhoeck & Ruprecht
- Gentry, Peter J.; Schulz-Flügel, Eva (eds.), Prouerbia, SVTG 11.1, Göttingen: Vandenhoeck & Ruprecht
- Schulz-Flügel, Eva (ed.), Canticum, SVTG 11.3, Göttingen: Vandenhoeck & Ruprecht

== See also ==
- Alfred Rahlfs' edition of the Septuagint
