= Anneli Aejmelaeus =

Finnish academic (1948–2025)

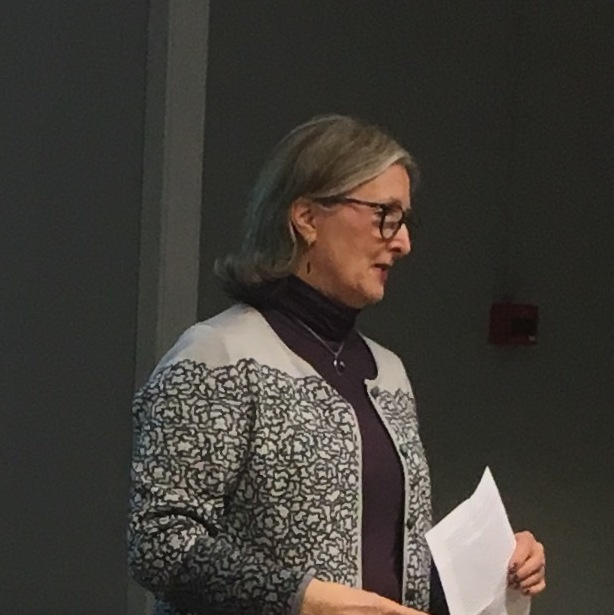
- Aejmelaeus giving a presentation
- Born: 18 September 1948; Mikkeli, Finland
- Died: 18 November 2025 (aged 77); Järvenpää, Finland
- Citizenship: Finnish
- Education: University of Helsinki

Anneli Pirjo Marjukka Aejmelaeus (née Halonen; 18 September 1948 – 18 November 2025) was a Finnish academic who was professor emerita of Old Testament and Ancient Near Eastern Culture and Literature in the Faculty of Theology at the University of Helsinki, and was the vice-director of the Academy of Finland Centre of Excellence "Changes in Sacred Texts and Traditions". Before this, she held from 1991 to 2009 the position of Professor of Old Testament and Septuagint Research in the Faculty of Theology at the University of Göttingen. In addition, from 1993 to 2000, Aejmelaeus was the Director of the research institute "Septuaginta-Unternehmen" at the Göttingen Academy of Sciences and Humanities. Aejmelaeus was born in Mikkeli on 18 September 1948, and died in Järvenpää on 18 November 2025, at the age of 77.

== Books ==
- Parataxis in the Septuagint: a study of the renderings of the Hebrew coordinate clauses in the Greek Pentateuch. Helsinki: Suomen Tiedeakatemia. (ISBN 951-41-0441-2).
- On the trail of the Septuagint translators: collected essays. Leuven: Peeters, 2007. (ISBN 978-90-429-1939-6).
- Täyttä hepreaa: johdatus Vanhan testamentin hepreaan. Helsinki: Kirjapaja, 2007. (ISBN 978-951-607-599-3).
