= Mittellateinisches Wörterbuch =

Mittellateinisches Wörterbuch (MLW, Mittellateinisches Wörterbuch bis zum ausgehenden 13. Jahrhundert) is a project for the edition of a comprehensive Medieval Latin dictionary, organised by a committee of the Bavarian Academy of Sciences and Humanities and published with C. H. Beck.

The plan for a dictionary replacing Du Cange's Glossarium Mediæ et Infimæ Latinitatis originates with the Union Académique Internationale, which established a Comité du dictionnaire du Latin médiéval in 1919. A collaboration of French and German academies was planned in 1939, but interrupted by the Second World War. Seventeen fascicles for MLW were published during 1959–1976, but work was delayed (fascicle 18 in 1985), and the second volume (letter C) was completed only in 1999. The third volume (D–E) was completed in 2007, and the fourth volume (F–I) is close to completion as of 2016.

- I. Band. 1–10: A–B. 1967. ISBN 978-3-406-03171-7
- II. Band. C. 1999. ISBN 978-3-406-41196-0
- III. Band: D – E.
  - Lieferung 1 (25 des Gesamtwerks): d – defatigo. 2000. ISBN 978-3-406-35805-0
  - Lieferung 2 (26 des Gesamtwerks): defatigo – densesco. 2001. ISBN 978-3-406-48078-2
  - Lieferung 3 (27 des Gesamtwerks): densensco – desuesco. 2001. ISBN 978-3-406-48923-5
  - Lieferung 4 (28 des Gesamtwerks): desuesco – digressus. 2002. ISBN 978-3-406-49555-7
  - Lieferung 5 (29 des Gesamtwerks): digressus – dissertatio. 2003. ISBN 978-3-406-50578-2
  - Lieferung 6 (30 des Gesamtwerks): dissertatio – dominum. 2004. ISBN 978-3-406-51948-2
  - Lieferung 7 (31 des Gesamtwerks): dominum – efficientia. 2004. ISBN 978-3-406-53093-7
  - Lieferung 8 (32 des Gesamtwerks): efficientia – enitor. 2005. ISBN 978-3-406-53932-9
  - Lieferung 9 (33 des Gesamtwerks): enitor – evito. 2006. ISBN 978-3-406-55048-5
  - Lieferung 10 (34 des Gesamtwerks): evito – eximius. 2007. ISBN 978-3-406-55973-0
  - Lieferung 11 (35 des Gesamtwerks): eximius – ezemenius. 2007. ISBN 978-3-406-56464-2
- IV. Band: F – .
  - Lieferung 1 (36 des Gesamtwerks): f – fero. 2008. ISBN 978-3-406-57826-7
  - Lieferung 2 (37 des Gesamtwerks): fero – florificatio 2009. ISBN 978-3-406-59387-1
  - Lieferung 3 (38 des Gesamtwerks): florificatio – frendor 2010. ISBN 978-3-406-60565-9
  - Lieferung 4 (39 des Gesamtwerks): frendor – gelo 2011. ISBN 978-3-406-61595-5
  - Lieferung 5 (40 des Gesamtwerks): gelo – gratuitus 2011. ISBN 978-3-406-62959-4
  - Lieferung 6 (41 des Gesamtwerks): gratuitus – hebdomadarius 2012. ISBN 978-3-406-62959-4
  - Lieferung 7 (42 des Gesamtwerks): hebdomadarius - horreo 2013. ISBN 978-3-406-65201-1
  - Lieferung 8 (43 des Gesamtwerks): hospitalarius - illicio 2014. ISBN 978-3-406-66259-1
  - Lieferung 9 (44 des Gesamtwerks): illibezzus - implumis 2015. ISBN 978-3-406-67758-8
  - Lieferung 10 (45 des Gesamtwerks): implumis - incontra 2016. ISBN 978-3-406-68394-7
  - Lieferung 11 (46 des Gesamtwerks): inconscriptus - infelix 2016. ISBN 978-3-406-69087-7 (Angekündigt für Sept. 2016)

== See also ==
- Thesaurus Linguae Latinae
