= Biblia Hebraica Quinta =

Fifth edition of the Biblia Hebraica

Biblia Hebraica series
- First fascicle (not the first chronologically published), Genesis, 2016
- BHK Biblia Hebraica Kittel (1. - 3.); BHS Biblia Hebraica Stuttgartensia (4.); BHQ Biblia Hebraica Quinta (5.)
- Translator: see BHQ Fascicles and Editors
- Language: Biblical Hebrew, Biblical Aramaic, English
- Publisher: Deutsche Bibelgesellschaft, Stuttgart
- Published: 2004 – est. 2032 (see release date)
- Media type: Hardcover pocket edition ("Handausgabe")
- Preceded by: Biblia Hebraica Stuttgartensia
- Website: https://www.academic-bible.com/en/home/current-projects/biblia-hebraica-quinta-bhq/

A sample page from Biblia Hebraica Quinta (Deuteronomy 1:1–11). Note the newly implemented and fully collated Masorah magna between the main text and the critical apparatus.

The Biblia Hebraica Quinta Editione, abbreviated as BHQ (or rarely BH^{5}), is the fifth edition of the Biblia Hebraica. When completed, it will supersede the fourth edition, the Biblia Hebraica Stuttgartensia (BHS/ BH^{4}).

== BHQ Edition Plan: Fascicles and Editors ==
The edition has been described as "international and ecumenical" as it features editors from a diverse range of institutions, countries, and denominations (with involvement from Catholics, Protestants and Jews). The work is currently being published in fascicles according to this release schedule:

	Fascicle	Editor	University / Institution	Country	Publication
1	Genesis	Avraham Tal	Tel Aviv University	Israel	**2016**
2	Exodus	Peter Schwagmeier	University of Zürich	Switzerland	in preparation
3	Leviticus	Innocent Himbaza*	University of Fribourg	Switzerland	**2020**
4	Numbers	Martin Rösel*	University of Rostock	Germany	in preparation (2026)
5	Deuteronomy	Carmel McCarthy^{†}	University College Dublin	Ireland	**2007**
6	Joshua	Seppo Sipilä	University of Helsinki	Finland	in preparation
6	Joshua	Pierre Casetti	University of Fribourg	Switzerland	in preparation
7	Judges	Natalio Fernández Marcos^{†}	CSIC Madrid	Spain	**2011**
8	Samuel	Stephen Pisano^{†}	Pontificio Istituto Biblico Rome	Italy	in preparation
8	Samuel	Craig E. Morrison*	Pontificio Istituto Biblico Rome	Italy	in preparation
8	Samuel	Leonardo Pessoa da Silva Pinto	Pontificio Istituto Biblico Rome	Italy	in preparation
8	Samuel	Claudio Balzaretti	Pontificio Istituto Biblico Rome	Italy	in preparation
9	Kings	**Adrian Schenker**	University of Fribourg	Switzerland	in preparation
9	Kings	Carmel McCarthy^{†}	University College Dublin	Ireland	in preparation
9	Kings	Łukasz Popko	École Biblique	Poland	in preparation
9	Kings	Stephen D. Ryan	Dominican House of Studies	United States	in preparation
9	Kings	Attila Bodor	Eötvös Loránd University	Hungary	in preparation
10	Isaiah	Arie van der Kooij*	Leiden University	Netherlands	in preparation
10	Isaiah	Mirjam van der Vorm-Croughs	Nederlands Bijbelgenootschap	Netherlands	in preparation
11	Jeremiah	Richard D. Weis^{†}	Lexington Theological Seminary	United States	in preparation
11	Jeremiah	Miika Tucker	University of Helsinki	Finland	in preparation
12	Ezekiel	Johan Lust	KU Leuven	Belgium	in preparation (2026)
12	Ezekiel	Siegfried Kreuzer	Protestant University Wuppertal	Germany	in preparation (2026)
12	Ezekiel	Matthieu Richelle	UCLouvain	Belgium	in preparation (2026)
13	Twelve Prophets	Anthony Gelston	Durham University	United Kingdom	**2010**
14	Chronicles	Zipora Talshir^{†}	University of Beer Sheva	Israel	in preparation
14	Chronicles	Dalia Amara	University of Beer Sheva	Israel	in preparation
15	Psalms	Gerard J. Norton*	University College Dublin	Ireland	in preparation
15	Psalms	Innocent Himbaza*	University of Fribourg	Switzerland	in preparation
15	Psalms	Matthieu Richelle	UCLouvain	Belgium	in preparation
15	Psalms	Rolf Schäfer*	German Bible Society Stuttgart	Germany	in preparation
15	Psalms	John Screnock	University of Oxford	United Kingdom	in preparation
16	Job	Robert Althann	Pontificio Istituto Biblico Rome	Italy	**2024**
17	Proverbs	Jan de Waard^{†}	University of Strasbourg	France	**2008**
18	General Introduction	Editorial Committee			**2004**
18	Ruth	Jan de Waard^{†}	University of Strasbourg	France	**2004**
18	Canticles	Piet B. Dirksen	Leiden University	Netherlands	**2004**
18	Qoheleth	Yohanan A. P. Goldman	University of Fribourg	Switzerland	**2004**
18	Lamentations	Rolf Schäfer*	German Bible Society Stuttgart	Germany	**2004**
18	Esther	Magne Sæbø	MF School of Theology Oslo	Norway	**2004**
19	Daniel	Augustinus Gianto	Pontificio Istituto Biblico Rome	Italy	in preparation
19	Daniel	Marco Settembrini	University of Bologna	Italy	in preparation
20	Ezra and Nehemiah	David Marcus*	JTS New York	United States	**2006**

**Bold**	indicates the president of the Editorial Committee
Italics	indicates former members of the Editorial Committee
*	indicates current members of the Editorial Committee
^{†}	indicates former editors who are now deceased

A number of consultants are also assisting with the project: for the Masorah, Aron Dotan (Tel Aviv University); for the electronic edition, data management, and programming, J. Alan Groves^{†} and Soetjianto (Westminster Theological Seminary); for copyediting, Roger Omanson, Harold Scanlin, and Sarah Lind (United Bible Societies); and as associate editors/reviewers, Siegried Kreuzer (Protestant University Wuppertal), Matthieu Richelle (University of Louvain), and Malka Strasberg-Edinger (Jewish Theological Seminary)

== Publication Notes ==
- The first volume (General Introduction and Megilloth, Fascicle 18) was published in 2004. (Note: The books are in the same order as in the Leningrad Codex and BHS, namely Ruth, Canticles (Song of Songs), Qoheleth (Ecclesiastes), Lamentations, and Esther.)
- The second volume (Ezra and Nehemiah, Fascicle 20) was published in 2006.
- The third volume (Deuteronomy, Fascicle 5) was published in 2007.
- The fourth volume (Proverbs, Fascicle 17) was published in 2009.
- The fifth volume (The Twelve Minor Prophets, Fascicle 13) was published in 2010.
- The sixth volume (Judges, Fascicle 7) was published in 2012.
- The seventh volume (Genesis, Fascicle 1) was published in 2016.
- The eighth volume (Leviticus, Fascicle 3) was published in 2021.
- The ninth volume (Job, Fascicle 16) was published in June 2024.

== Completion Date ==
Due to meticulous nature of the work, the timeline for the edition's completion has constantly been delayed. Before the release of the first fascicle in 2002, one of the original editors, Richard D. Weis, expressed optimistically that the project would be completed by 2010.

== See also ==
- Biblia Hebraica Stuttgartensia
- Oxford Hebrew Bible
- Hebrew University Bible
- Hebrew Old Testament Text Project

== Further readings ==
- Richard D. Weis, "Biblia Hebraica Quinta and the Making of Critical Editions of the Hebrew Bible", TC: A Journal of Biblical Textual Criticism 2002 (including sample pages showing edition, apparatuses, and textual commentary for Jeremiah 23:1-9)
- James A. Sanders, review of the BHQ edition of the Megilloth, Review of Biblical Literature 2005
