= Biblia Hebraica Stuttgartensia =

Edition of the Masoretic Text of the Hebrew Bible

Biblia Hebraica series
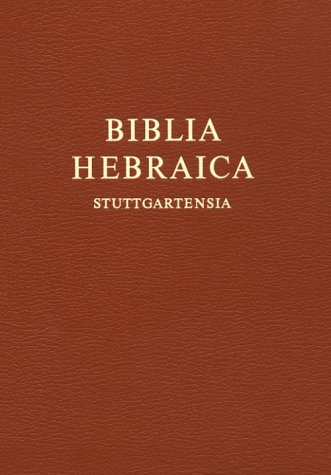
- BHK Biblia Hebraica Kittel (1. - 3.); BHS Biblia Hebraica Stuttgartensia (4.); BHQ Biblia Hebraica Quinta (5.)
- Edited by: Karl Elliger, Wilhelm Rudolph et al.
- Language: Biblical Hebrew, Biblical Aramaic (with prolegomena in German, English, French, Spanish, Latin)
- Publisher: Deutsche Bibelgesellschaft, Stuttgart
- Published: 1968–1976; 1997; 26 August 1998
- Media type: see BHS editions
- OCLC: 148815162
- Preceded by: Biblia Hebraica Kittel
- Followed by: Biblia Hebraica Quinta
- Website: Official BHS text on www.academic-bible.com "The Biblia Hebraica Stuttgartensia" on www.academic-bible.com

A sample page from Biblia Hebraica Stuttgartensia (Genesis 1,1-16a).

The Biblia Hebraica Stuttgartensia, abbreviated as BHS or rarely BH^{4}, is an edition of the Masoretic Text of the Hebrew Bible as preserved in the Leningrad Codex, and supplemented by Masoretic and text-critical notes. It is the fourth edition in the Biblia Hebraica series started by Rudolf Kittel and is published by the Deutsche Bibelgesellschaft (German Bible Society) in Stuttgart.

== BHS fascicles and editors ==
The work has been published in 15 fascicles from 1968 to 1976 according to this release schedule taken from the Latin prolegomena in the book.

	Fascicle	Editor	Publication
01	Librum Geneseos (Book of Genesis)	Otto Eißfeldt	1969 (Fascicle 1)
02f	Libros Exodi et Levitici (Books of Exodus and Leviticus)	Gottfried Quell	1973 (Fascicle 2)
04	Librum Numerorum (Book of Numbers)	Wilhelm Rudolph	1972 (Fascicle 3a)
05	Librum Deuteronomii (Book of Deuteronomy)	J. Hempel	1972 (Fascicle 3b)
06f	Libros Josuae et Judicum (Books of Joshua and Judges)	Rudolf Meyer	1972 (Fascicle 4)
08	Librum Samuelis (Books of Samuel)	Pieter Arie Hendrik de Boer	1976 (Fascicle 5)
09	Librum Regum (Books of Kings)	Alfred Jepsen	1974 (Fascicle 6)
10	Librum Jesaiae (Book of Isaiah)	David Winton Thomas	1968 (Fascicle 7)
11	Librum Jeremiae (Book of Jeremiah)	Wilhelm Rudolph	1970 (Fascicle 8)
12	Librum Ezechielis (Book of Ezekiel)	Karl Elliger	1971 (Fascicle 9)
13	Librum XII Prophetarum (Book of the Twelve Prophets)	Karl Elliger	1970 (Fascicle 10)
14	Librum Psalmorum (Book of Psalms)	H. Bardtke	1969 (Fascicle 11)
15	Librum Iob (Book of Job)	Gillis Gerlemann	1974 (Fascicle 12a)
16	Librum Proverbiorum (Book of Proverbs)	F. Fichtner	1974 (Fascicle 12b)
17	Librum Ruth (Book of Ruth)	Theodore Henry Robinson	1975 (Fascicle 13a)
18f	Libros Cantici Canticorum et Ecclesiastes (Books of the Song of Songs and Ecclesiastes)	F. Horst	1975 (Fascicle 13b)
20	Librum Threnorum (Book of Lamentations)	Theodore Henry Robinson	1975 (Fascicle 13c)
21	Librum Esther (Book of Esther)	F. Maass	1975 (Fascicle 13d)
22	Librum Danielis (Book of Daniel)	Walter Baumgartner	1976 (Fascicle 14a)
23	Libros Esrae et Nehemiae (Books of Ezra and Nehemiah)	Wilhelm Rudolph	1976 (Fascicle 14b)
24	Libros Chronicorum (Books of Chronicles)	Wilhelm Rudolph	1975 (Fascicle 15)

The processing and development of the Masoretic annotations and notes within all editions of the Biblia Hebraica Stuttgartensia was the privilege of Gérard E. Weil. He also released the book Massorah Gedolah iuxta codicem Leningradensem B 19a at the Pontifical Biblical Institute in 1971, which is the very first Edition of the Masora Magna, what gives an idea of his unique expertise in relation to the Masoretic Text.

== A print edition of the Leningrad Codex ==
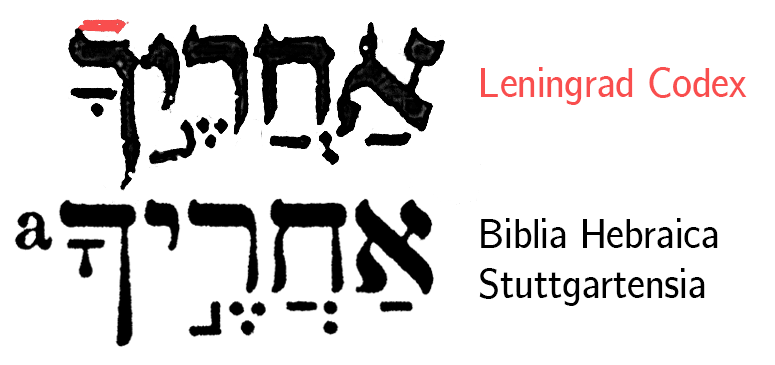
Like many Hebrew Bible print editions the BHS omits the Rafe diacritic consistently ("אחריך" from Cant 1:4a).

The Biblia Hebraica Stuttgartensia is meant to be an exact copy of the Masoretic Text as recorded in the Leningrad Codex. According to the introductory prolegomena of the book, the editors have "accordingly refrained from removing obvious scribal errors" (these have then been noted in the critical apparatus). Diacritics like the Silluq and Meteg which were missing in the Leningrad Codex also have not been added.

Like its predecessor the Biblia Hebraica Kittel the BHS adds the letters samekh "ס" (for סתומה, setumah: "closed portion") and "פ" (for פתוחה, petuchah: "open portion") into the text to indicate blank spaces in the Leningrad Codex, which divide the text into sections.

One more difference to the Leningrad Codex is the book order: the Books of Chronicles have been moved to the end as it appears in common Hebrew bibles, even though it precedes Psalms in the codex.

== Contents ==
The BHS is composed of the three traditional divisions of the Hebrew Scriptures: the Torah (תורה "instruction"), Neviim (נבאים "prophets"), and the Ketuvim (כתבים "writings").

In the margins are Masoretic notes. These are based on the codex, but have been heavily edited to make them more consistent and easier to understand. Even so, whole books have been written to explain these notes themselves. Some of the notes are marked sub loco ("in this place"), meaning that there appears to be some problem, often that they contradict the text. The editors never published any explanation of what the problems were, or how they might be resolved.

The sub loco notes do not necessarily explain interesting text variants; they are, in the vast majority, only notes on inaccurate word countings/frequencies. See Daniel S. Mynatt, The Sub Loco Notes in the Torah of Biblia Hebraica Stuttgartensia (Bibal, 1994); Christopher Dost, The Sub-Loco Notes in the Torah of Biblia Hebraica Stuttgartensia (Gorgias, 2016).

Footnotes record possible corrections to the Hebrew text. Many are based on the Samaritan Pentateuch, the Dead Sea Scrolls and on early Bible translations ("versions") such as the Septuagint, Vulgate and Peshitta. Others are conjectural emendations.

== Book order ==
The order of the biblical books generally follows the codex, even for the Ketuvim, where that order differs from most common printed Hebrew bibles. Thus the Book of Job comes after Psalms and before Proverbs, and the Megillot are in the order Ruth, Song of Songs, Ecclesiastes, Lamentations and Esther. The only difference is with Chronicles.

The Torah:

1. Genesis [בראשית / B^{e}re’shit] (English rendering: "In beginning")
2. Exodus [שמות / Sh^{e}mot] (English rendering: "Names")
3. Leviticus [ויקרא / Vayik^{e}ra’] (English rendering: "And he called")
4. Numbers [במדבר / Bamid^{e}bar] (English rendering: "In the wilderness")
5. Deuteronomy [דברים / D^{e}varim] (English rendering: "The words")

The Nevi'im:

6. Joshua [יהושע / Y^{e}hoshua‛]
7. Judges [שופטים / Shoph^{e}tim]
8. Samuel (I & II) [שמואל / Sh^{e}muel]
9. Kings (I & II) [מלכים / M^{e}lakhim]
10. Isaiah [ישעיה / Y^{e}sha‛yahu]
11. Jeremiah [ירמיה / Yir^{e}miyahu]
12. Ezekiel [יחזקאל / Y^{e}khezq’el]
13. The Twelve Prophets [תרי עשר]

a. Hosea [הושע / Hoshea‛]
b. Joel [יואל / Yo’el]
c. Amos [עמוס / Amos]
d. Obadiah [עובדיה / ‛Ovadyah]
e. Jonah [יונה / Yonah]
f. Micah [מיכה / Mikhah]
g. Nahum [נחום / Nakhum]
h. Habakkuk [חבקוק /Havaquq]
i. Zephaniah [צפניה / Ts^{e}phanyah]
j. Haggai [חגי / Khagai]
k. Zechariah [זכריה / Z^{e}kharyah]
l. Malachi [מלאכי / Mal’akhi]

The Ketuvim

The Sifrei Emet, the poetic books:

14. Psalms [תהלים / Tehilim]
15. Job [איוב / ’Iyov]
16. Proverbs [משלי / Mishlei]

The Five Megillot or "Five Scrolls":

17. Ruth [רות / Ruth]
18. Song of Songs [שיר השירים / Shir Hashirim]
19. Ecclesiastes [קהלת / Qoheleth]
20. Lamentations [איכה / Eikhah]
21. Esther [אסתר / Esther]

The rest of the "Writings":

22. Daniel [דניאל / Dani’el]
23. Ezra-Nehemiah [עזרא ונחמיה / ‛Ezra’ v^{e}Nekhemiah]
24. Chronicles (I & II) [דברי הימים / Div^{e}rei Hayamim]

== Biblia Hebraica Stuttgartensia: A Reader's Edition ==
In September 2014 an edition of the BHS called Biblia Hebraica Stuttgartensia: A Reader's Edition (abbreviated as the BHS Reader) was published by the German Bible Society and Hendrickson Publishers. This edition features the same Hebrew text as the regular BHS, but without the Masora on the side margins and with a "Lexical and Grammatical Apparatus" on the bottom of the page replacing the critical apparatus of the BHS.

The edition defines an English translation to every word in the text: words that occur 70 times or more are listed in a glossary in the back of the book, and words that occur fewer than 70 times are listed in the apparatus. The translations were mostly taken out of the Hebrew and Aramaic Lexicon of the Old Testament, but also from DCH (Note: DCH: Dictionary of Classical Hebrew by David J. A. Clines) and the Brown–Driver–Briggs.

Alongside the translations it features a grammatical parsing of the words encoded in a system of abbreviations (e.g. an introductory example in the book states that the word "והקריבו" from Lev 1:15 has the note "Hr10s0 קרב" in the apparatus which means that the word is a "Hiphil suffix conjugation third masculine singular verb with a wāv retentive and a third masculine singular pronominal suffix of the root קרב"). It also has a 50-page appendix listing paradigm-tables for strong and weak verbal roots and noun suffixes.

== Criticism ==
The bible scholar Emanuel Tov has criticised BHS somewhat for having errors, and for correcting errors in later editions without informing the reader.

== See also ==
- List of Hebrew Bible manuscripts
- Hebrew University Bible Project
- Hebrew Bible: A Critical Edition
- Biblia Hebraica Quinta
- Stuttgart Vulgate
- Hebrew Old Testament Text Project

== BHS editions ==
- Biblia Hebraica Stuttgartensia, Standard Edition, ISBN 978-3-438-05218-6
- Biblia Hebraica Stuttgartensia, Pocket Book Edition, ISBN 978-3-438-05219-3
- Biblia Hebraica Stuttgartensia, Study Edition (paperback), ISBN 978-3-438-05222-3
- Biblia Hebraica Stuttgartensia, Wide-Margin Edition, ISBN 978-3-438-05224-7
- Biblia Sacra Utriusque Testamenti Editio Hebraica et Graeca (with Novum Testamentum Graece), ISBN 978-3-438-05250-6
- Biblia Hebraica Stuttgartensia: A Reader's Edition, compiled by Donald R. Vance, Yael Avrahami, and George Athas, ISBN 978-1-598-56342-9
