= Conjecture (textual criticism) =

Conjecture—as in conjectural emendation—is a critical reconstruction of the original reading of a clearly corrupt, contaminated, nonsensical or illegible textual fragment. Conjecture is one of the techniques of textual criticism used by philologists while commenting on or preparing editions of manuscripts (e.g. biblical or other ancient texts usually transmitted in medieval copies). Conjecture is far from being just an educated guess and it takes an experienced expert with a broad knowledge of the author of the text, period, language and style of the time. Conjecture requires a close study of the text in its cultural and historical context and must be preceded with a thorough analysis of all extant versions and readings of the given fragment. The knowledge of writing styles used by the scribes throughout the transmission stages is also essential. Conjectural emendation must be clearly indicated in the critical apparatus or in the text itself.

== Conjectural emendations in modern Bible translation ==
The New Revised Standard Version and New International Version adopt a conjectural emendation ('Cn') in Prov. 26.23 ('glaze' instead of 'silver dross', MT).

== See also ==
- Textual criticism
- Paleography

== Sources ==
- Krans, Jan (2006) Beyond what is written: Erasmus and Beza as conjectural critics of the New Testament, Brill, ISBN 90-04-15286-5
