= Deutsche Bibelgesellschaft =

German religious foundation

German Bible Society
- Deutsche Bibelgesellschaft
- Logo of Deutschen Bibelgesellschaft
- Established: 1981
- Purpose: Publishing, research and missionary work for the dissemination of Bibles
- Location: Stuttgart, Germany
- Region served: Germany
- Official language: German
- General Secretary: Christoph Rösel
- Chairperson: Annette Kurschus
- Revenue: €1,500,000 (2011)
- Website: https://www.die-bibel.de/en/

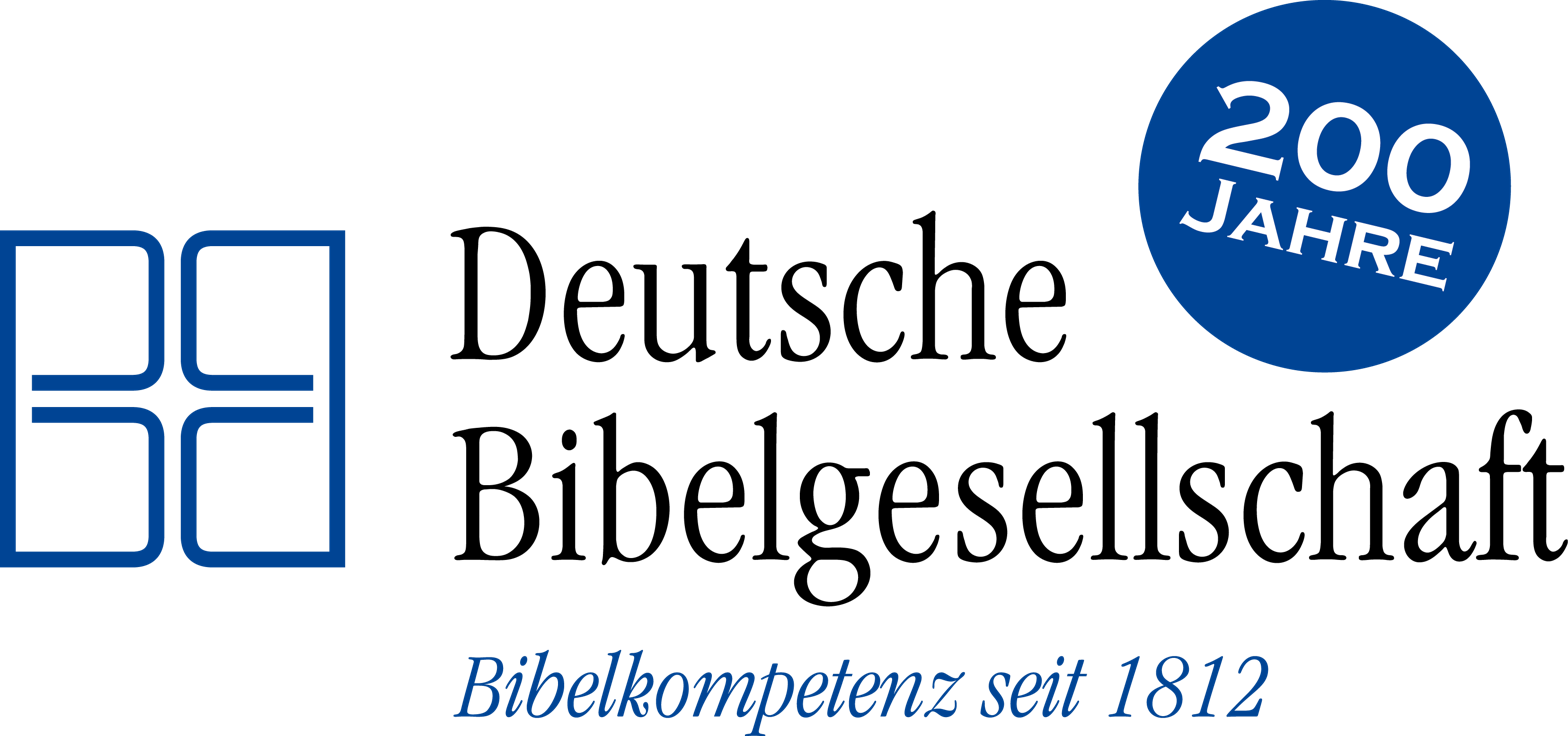
The anniversary logo of the German Bible Society

The Deutsche Bibelgesellschaft ("German Bible Society") is a religious foundation regulated by public law. It is involved in publishing and in spreading the message of the Bible.

The Society publishes the Bible in the original languages and in translation, as well as the texts of the Apocrypha and scholarly works in biblical studies.

== History ==
In 1965, independent regional Bible Societies came together as the Protestant Bible Organisation. The German Bible Society was formed in 1981 when this organization joined with the German Bible Foundation, made up of the Bible Societies of the Protestant Churches of the German states. The Society is based in the Möhringen district of Stuttgart. Its origins can be traced back to, among other things, the Canstein Bible Institution, founded in 1710.

Published books

The German Bible Society's publishing operations cover more than 700 books and other products, of which 300 are Bible editions. It distributes more than 400,000 Bibles annually, mainly Martin Luther's translation of the Bible and the modern Good News Bible. The Society publishes the internationally accepted base texts for Bible translation: the Biblia Hebraica Stuttgartensia, the Novum Testamentum Graece and the Greek New Testament. Its publications also include Children's Bibles, electronic Bibles and Bibles in other formats.

It also offers an online Bible dictionary compiled by subject experts.

- Novum Testamentum Graece Nestle-Aland.
- Biblia Hebraica Stuttgartensia
- Stuttgart Vulgate
- Plisch, Uwe-Karsten (2007). Das Thomasevangelium. Originaltext mit Kommentar. Stuttgart: Deutsche Bibelgesellschaft. ISBN 978-3-438-05128-8.
- Handkonkordanz zum griechischen Neuen Testament, A. Schmoller
- Konkordanz zum hebräischen Alten Testament, G. Lisowsky

== Bible ministry ==
According to its constitution, the second main function of the German Bible Society is spreading the message of the Bible. The primary aim is to make the Bible accessible. In the past, this was seen as being achieved mainly through Bible distribution, but today it is also regarded as important to provide people with new ways of accessing the Bible. This work is carried out through 19 offices operated by regional Bible Societies.

Alongside 145 other Bible Societies around the world, the German Bible Society works to translate, publish and distribute the Holy Scriptures. Bible Societies seek to make the Bible available to all people in their mother language at a price they can afford. Since 1975, the German Bible Society's World Bible Support initiative has been raising funds in Germany to support projects in less wealthy countries which are working towards this goal.

== Structure ==
The German Bible Society's executive units are the general assembly, the board and the management team. The principles and guidelines for its work are determined by the general assembly, which is made up of representatives of 23 regional Bible Societies, 14 Free Churches and Christian organisations, along with individuals.

The board is responsible for ensuring that the foundation's duties are fulfilled and for monitoring the Society's activities. It is made up of a chairperson, two deputies and up to 16 other members. The current chairperson (2011) is Johannes Friedrich, Bishop of Bavaria.

The management team is responsible for implementing policy. The Society's General Secretary is the Rev Klaus Sturm, who in January 2010 succeeded Jan-A. Bühner, General Secretary from 1997. Working with the General Secretary on the management team is Commercial Director Felix Breidenstein.

The German Bible Society is a member of the missionary services working group of the German Protestant Church.

It also works in partnership with the Catholic Bible Society to run the Stuttgart-based ecumenical travel agency 'Biblische Reisen', which offers study tours to Israel and to other significant places in Christianity and in religious life.

== See also ==
- Bible society
- British and Foreign Bible Society
- German Bible translations
- Institute for New Testament Textual Research
- Luther Bible
- United Bible Societies
