= Daniel Boyarin =

Israeli–American academic and historian of religion (born 1946)

- דניאל בויארין
- Born: December 6, 1946 (age 79); Asbury Park, New Jersey, U.S.

Academic background
- Education: Goddard College, Jewish Theological Seminary of America, Columbia University

Academic work
- Institutions: University of California, Berkeley
- Notable students: Christine Hayes, Charlotte Fonrobert, Azzan Yadin
- Website: cmes.berkeley.edu/people/daniel-boyarin

Daniel Boyarin (Hebrew: דניאל בויארין; born 1946) is an Israeli–American academic and historian of religion. Born in New Jersey, he holds dual United States and Israeli citizenship. He is the Hermann P. and Sophia Taubman Professor of Talmudic Culture in the Departments of Near Eastern Studies and Rhetoric at the University of California, Berkeley. He is married to Chava Boyarin, a lecturer in Hebrew at UC Berkeley. They have two sons. His brother, Jonathan Boyarin, is also a scholar, and the two have written together. He has defined himself as a "diasporic rabbinic Jew".

== Career ==
Being of Litvak background on all four sides, Boyarin was raised in Asbury Park, New Jersey, Boyarin attended Freehold High School. A graduate of the class of 1964, Boyarin was inducted into the school's hall of fame in 2009.

Boyarin was educated at Goddard College, the Jewish Theological Seminary, and Columbia University before earning his doctoral degree at the Jewish Theological Seminary of America. He moved to Israel but developed anti-Zionist views in response to what he has claimed was an Israeli policy of breaking the arms and legs of Palestinian demonstrators during the First Intifada. He has taught at Ben Gurion University of the Negev, the Hebrew University of Jerusalem, Bar-Ilan University, Yale, Harvard, Yeshiva University, and the University of California at Berkeley. He is a member of the Enoch Seminar, and of the advisory board of the journal Henoch. In 2005, he was elected fellow of the American Academy of Arts and Sciences.

A number of Boyarin's students, including Christine Hayes, Charlotte Fonrobert, and Azzan Yadin, occupy Rabbinics posts at various American universities. Joseph Cedar's Oscar-nominated film Footnote alludes in a running joke on a fine point of Talmudic scholarship to Boyarin and his reputation for vast erudition.

== Views and writings ==
His first book, Sephardic Speculation (written in Hebrew, 1989), examines the Talmudic methodology of Isaac Canpanton (1360–1463, Spain). Carnal Israel: Reading Sex in Talmudic Culture (1993) applies the methods of New Historicism to the subject of Rabbinic attitudes toward sexuality.

In Unheroic Conduct (1997), Boyarin's interests mesh with those of others, such as Sander Gilman and Jay Geller, who have begun to explore the relationship between psychoanalysis and Judaism. For Boyarin, the Oedipus complex both incarnates and disavows a fear Sigmund Freud had of being classified as feminine in the context of the times in which he lived, times that were antisemitic and that ultimately culminated in the Holocaust. Boyarin holds that passivity is an essential feature of Judaism, and that because this was how homosexuality was defined in Freud's era, it had the power to inspire panic among Jews who fear the censorious gaze of authority.

Boyarin supports his argument that deference is essential to Judaism with the observation that Judaism worships a powerful male authority figure who demands obeisance and with documentary evidence such as haggadot, prayer guides for the Jewish ritual of the Passover Seder, that show the wise son as the retiring scholar and the wicked son as the man of war. Martha Nussbaum credits him with the insight that Jewish sensibilities "reshaped Roman norms of manliness, making the astonishing claim that the true man sits still all day with a book, and has the bodily shape of someone who does just that".

Border Lines (2004) examines the early stages of partitioning Judaism and Christianity into separate and distinct religions. Socrates and the Fat Rabbis (2009) explores the dialogic structure in Plato and the Babylonian Talmud. The Jewish Gospels: The Story of the Jewish Christ (2012) carries on the line of exploration begun in Border Lines, developing the argument that "New Testament" ideas can be found in long-standing Jewish traditions.

Boyarin has written extensively on Talmudic and Midrashic studies, and about the Jews as a colonized people. His current research interests include the relationship of Judaism and Christianity in the modern era.

== Views on the State of Israel ==
Boyarin is a self-proclaimed Jewish anti-Zionist and has been highly critical of Israeli governments. In the preface to one of his books, where he discusses the many versions of Judaism in late antiquity and the binary model that gatekeeps definitions of Judaism, he writes in passing:

"On the stairs of my synagogue, in Berkeley, on Rosh Hashanah this year, I was told that I should be praying in a mosque, and versions of this, less crude perhaps, are being hurled at Jews daily by other Jews. [...] More piercing to me is the pain of watching a tradition, my Judaism, to which I have dedicated my life, disintegrating before my eyes. It has been said by many Christians that Christianity died at Auschwitz, Treblinka, and Sobibor. I fear, God forbid, that my Judaism may be dying at Nablus, Deheishe, Betein (Bethel), and El-Khalil (Hebron). [...] If we are not for ourselves, other Jews say to me, who will be for us? And I answer, but if we are for ourselves alone, what are we?"

This remark, which, according to Sylvain Cypel, mirrored the attitude articulated by the Israeli philosopher Yeshayahu Leibowitz, was considered blasphemous when it was published.

In a highly publicised essay, Progressive Jewish Thought and the New Anti-Semitism, Alvin H. Rosenfeld criticised Boyarin for these words—and in particular for the parallel to the Holocaust, which, according to Rosenfeld, is "a sure sign that lucid thinking has been replaced by bias"—and concludes that through these remarks, "Jewish identity is affirmed in opposition to the Jewish state".

== Bibliography ==
- A Critical Edition of the Babylonian Talmud, Tractate Nazir (Doctoral dissertation, 1975).
- Sephardic Speculation: A Study in Methods of Talmudic Interpretation (Hebrew), (Jerusalem: Hebrew University, 1989).
- Intertextuality and the Reading of Midrash (Bloomington: Indiana University Press, 1990).
- Carnal Israel: Reading Sex in Talmudic Culture (Berkeley: University of California Press, 1993).
- A Radical Jew: Paul and the Politics of Identity (Berkeley: University of California Press, 1994).
- Unheroic Conduct: The Rise of Heterosexuality and the Invention of the Jewish Man (University of California Press, 1997)
- Dying for God: Martyrdom and the Making of Christianity and Judaism (Stanford University Press, 1999)
- Queer Theory and the Jewish Question (Columbia University Press, 2003)
- Border Lines: The Partition of Judaeo-Christianity (University of Pennsylvania Press, 2004)
- Socrates and the Fat Rabbis (University of Chicago Press, 2009)
- The Jewish Gospels: The Story of the Jewish Christ, (The New Press, 2012)
- A Traveling Homeland: The Babylonian Talmud as Diaspora (University of Pennsylvania Press, 2015)
- Imagine No Religion: How Modern Abstractions Hide Ancient Realities, with Carlin A. Barton (Fordham University Press, 2016)
- Judaism: The Genealogy of a Modern Notion (Rutgers University Press, 2019)
- The No-State Solution: A Jewish Manifesto (Yale University Press, 2023)

== See also ==
- Géza Vermes
- Paula Fredriksen
