= Loren Stuckenbruck =

Historian and academic (born 1960)

Loren T. Stuckenbruck (born 1960) is a historian of early Christianity and Second Temple Judaism, currently professor of New Testament at LMU Munich in Germany. His work has exerted a significant impact on the field.

== Career ==
With a B.A. from Milligan University and an M.Div. and Ph.D. from Princeton Theological Seminary, Stuckenbruck taught at Kiel University, in Germany, from 1992 to 1994 before moving to the Department of Theology and Religion at Durham University, in the United Kingdom, as B. F. Westcott Chair in Biblical Studies (1994–2009). Beginning in 2009, he served as Richard Dearborn Professor of New Testament Studies at Princeton Theological Seminary. Since 2012, he has held a chair in New Testament with a specialisation in Second Temple Judaism at LMU Munich.

== Honors and awards ==
Early in his career, Stuckenbruck received prestigious grants from the Fulbright Foundation (1986–1988) and the Alexander von Humboldt Foundation (1998). In 2006, he held a fellowship from the British Trust for the Ecumenical Institute at Tantur. Six years later, in 2012, he served as Lady Davis Professor at Hebrew University of Jerusalem.

== Professional Activities ==
Stuckenbruck has sat on numerous editorial boards for international academic journals, including Zeitschrift für die Neutestamentliche Wissenschaft, Journal for the Study of the Pseudepigrapha, Journal of Biblical Literature, New Testament Studies, Henoch, Dead Sea Discoveries, and Journal for the Study of Judaism. He has also served as editor for a number of different book series, e.g., Themes in Biblical Narrative (Leiden, Brill), Commentaries on Early Jewish Literature (Berlin, Walter De Gruyter), Library of Second Temple Studies (London, Continuum), European Studies on Christian Origins (London, Continuum), and is now an editor of the series Ethopian Bible and Related Literature (Tübingen, Mohr Siebeck).

Through his scholarly research, Stuckenbruck has pursued interdisciplinary and collaborative work with scholars from the Middle East (Israel, Egypt), Ethiopia, Germany, Denmark, Norway, the Netherlands, France, Switzerland, Austria, Canada, Italy, Bellgium, France, Greece, Bulgaria, Romania, Slovakia, Poland, and the United Kingdom.

== Areas of Expertise ==
Published in four single-authored books, over 20 co-authored or edited books, and some 200 articles, Stuckenbruck's research focuses on Second Temple Judaism and Early Christianity. These publications reflect historical, theological, and interdisciplinary interests. In particular, his work centers on the Dead Sea Scrolls, Enoch literature, other Jewish sapiential and apocalyptic writings, and the literature of the New Testament. Themes most commonly addressed in his publications include theological anthropology, the problem of evil, demonology, mental and physical well-being, angelology, eschatology, biblical cosmology, monotheistic belief, origins of Christology, and text-critical editions (esp. Aramaic, Syriac, Hebrew, Greek, Latin, Ethiopic). His writing focuses on evil in the New Testament (the Gospels, Paul, and the Book of Revelation), the Aramaic documents of the Dead Sea Scrolls, a commentary on the Enochic Book of Watchers (Anchor Bible, Yale University Press), canon in the context of Judaism and a broad range of Christian traditions, and on text-critical work on the early Enoch literature preserved primarily in Aramaic, Greek and Ethiopic (Ge'ez).

== Selected works ==
=== Books ===
- Stuckenbruck, Loren T. (1995). Angel Veneration and Christology. Wissenschaftliche Untersuchungen zum Neuen Testament. Vol. II.70. Tübingen: Mohr Siebeck. - Reprinted in 2017 by Baylor University Press (Waco, Texas).
- ——— (1997). The Book of Giants from Qumran. Text und Studien zum Antiken Judentum. Vol. 63. Tübingen: Mohr Siebeck.
- ——— (2007). 1 Enoch 91-108. Commentaries on Early Jewish Literature. Berlin: Walter de Gruyter.
- ——— (2014). The Myth of Rebellious Angels: Studies in Second Temple Judaism and the New Testament. Wissenschaftliche Untersuchung zum Neuen Testament. Vol. 336. Tübingen: Mohr Siebeck. - Reprinted in 2017 by Eerdmans (Grand Rapids, Michigan).

=== Edited by ===
- ———; Weeks, Stuart; Gathercole, Simon, eds. (2004). The Book of Tobit: Texts and Concordances to the Aramaic, Hebrew, Greek, Lain, and Syriac Versions. Fontes et Subsidia. Berlin: Walter de Gruyter.
- ———; North, Wendy, eds. (2004). Early Jewish and Christian Monotheism. Early Christianity in Context and JSNTSS 267. London: Continuum.
- ———; Auffarth, Christoph, eds. (2004). The Fall of the Angels. Themes in Biblical Narrative. Vol. 6. Leiden: Brill. ISBN 9781429409933. OCLC 191936537.
- ———; Barton, Stephen C.; Wold, Benjamin G., eds. (2007). Memory in the Bible and Antiquity. Tübingen: Mohr Siebeck.
- ———; Brooke, George J.; Najman, Hindy, eds. (2008). The Significance of Sinai. Themes in Biblical Narrative. Vol. 10. Leiden: Brill.
- ———; Goff, Matthew; Morano, Enrico, eds. (2016). Ancient Tales of Giants from Qumran and Turfan. Tübingen: Mohr Siebeck.
- ———; Boccaccini, Gabriele, eds. (2016). Enoch and the Synoptic Gospels: Reminiscences, Influences, and Intertextuality. Atlanta, GA: SBL Press.
- ———; Reynolds, Benjamin, eds. (2017). The Jewish Apocalyptic Tradition and the Shaping of New Testament Thought. Minneapolis, MN: Fortress Press.
- ———; Gurtner, Daniel M., eds. (2019). Encyclopedia of Second Temple Judaism (2 volumes). London: T & T Clark.
- ———; Smith, Daniel L., eds. (2020). Testing and Temptation in Second Temple Jewish and Early Christian Texts. Tübingen: Mohr Siebeck.

=== Articles and Chapters ===
- ——— (2003). "Revelation". In Dunn, James D. G.; Rogerson, John W. (eds.). Eerdmans Commentary on the Bible. Grand Rapids, MI: Eerdmans. pp. 1535–1572. (a short commentary).

=== Translations ===
- Beker, J. Christiaan (1990). The Triumph of God: The Essence of Paul's Thought. Translated by ———. Minneapolis, MN: Augsburg Fortress Press.
