= Progressive Jewish Thought and the New Anti-Semitism =

Essay

Front cover art for the book

" 'Progressive' Jewish Thought and the New Anti-Semitism" is a 2006 essay written by Alvin Hirsch Rosenfeld, director of Indiana University's Center for the Study of Contemporary Antisemitism and professor of English and Jewish Studies. It was published by the American Jewish Committee (AJC) with an introduction by AJC executive director David A. Harris. The essay claims that a "number of Jews, through their speaking and writing, are feeding a rise in virulent antisemitism by questioning whether Israel should even exist".

== The essay ==
=== Motivation ===
Rosenfeld described his motivation for writing the essay in an interview featured on the CampusJ blog:

Over the last few years I've been focusing a lot of my research on present day anti-Semitism.... In the course of my research I began to notice that some of the people who were voicing some of the harshest hostility were themselves Jews, especially Jews on the radical Left. I wanted to document and try to explain their words, which struck me as often being extreme.

Rosenfeld explained his motivation to The New York Times; he "wanted to show that in an age when anti-Semitism is resurgent, Jews thinking the way they're thinking is feeding into a very nasty cause.... Opposing Israel's settlement of the West Bank or treatment of Palestinians 'is, in itself, not anti-Semitic', [Rosenfeld] writes; it is questioning Israel's right to exist that crosses the line."

=== Specific criticisms by Rosenfeld ===
==== Richard Cohen ====
Rosenfeld criticized Richard Cohen for writing in a Washington Post column that "The greatest mistake Israel could make at the moment is to forget that Israel itself is a mistake.... The idea of creating a nation of European Jews in an area of Arab Muslims (and some Christians) has produced a century of warfare and terrorism of the sort we are seeing now.... Its most formidable enemy is history itself," and for writing that "There is no point in blaming Hezbollah" during the summer 2006 Israel–Hezbollah War.

==== Daniel Boyarin ====
Rosenfeld quoted Daniel Boyarin with disapprobation for having written: "Just as Christianity may have died at Auschwitz, Treblinka and Sobibor ... so I fear that my Judaism may be dying at Nablus, Deheishe, Beteen (Beth-El) and El-Khalil (Hebron)." Rosenfeld accuses Boyarin of lacking "lucid thinking" as well as "bias" for having drawn an analogy between the Nazi Holocaust and the Israeli government's conduct toward the Palestinians.

==== Radicals, Rabbis and Peacemakers ====
Rosenfeld wrote, "The Israel that emerges in [the book] Radicals, Rabbis and Peacemakers – a country characterised as 'amoral', 'barbaric', 'brutal', 'destructive', 'fascistic', 'oppressive', 'racist', 'sordid', and 'uncivilised' – is indistinguishable from the despised country regularly denounced by the most impassioned anti-semites." Rosenfeld derides the interviewed subjects of the book for "not driven by anything remotely like reasoned historical analysis, but rather by a complex range of psychological as well as political motives that subvert reason and replace it with something akin to hysteria".

== The New York Times story ==
While the essay was released in 2006, it did not attract mainstream attention until it was covered in a January 2007 New York Times piece by Patricia Cohen.

Cohen wrote that Rosenfeld's "essay comes at a time of high anxiety among many Jews, who are seeing not only a surge in attacks from familiar antagonists, but also gloves-off condemnations of Israel from one-time allies and respected figures" and goes on to note, "bitter debates over anti-Israel statements and antisemitism have entangled government officials, academics, opinion-makers and others over the past year, particularly since fervent supporters and tough critics of Israel can be found on the right and the left". In addition, Cohen devoted significant column inches to the angry reactions of many of those named by Rosenfeld in his essay.

The New York Times quoted Richard Cohen saying, "the essay cherry-picked quotations. '[Rosenfeld] mischaracterized what I wrote', [Richard Cohen] said. 'I've been critical of Israel at times, but I've always been a defender of Israel.' He did add, however, that a wide range of writers were named, some of whom have written inflammatory words about Israel. 'He has me in a very strange neighborhood.'"

Tony Judt described to The New York Times that he believed the real purpose of outspoken denunciations of him and others was to stifle their harsh criticism of Israel and its treatment of the Palestinians. "'The link between anti-Zionism and anti-Semitism is newly created,' [Judt] said, adding that he fears 'the two will have become so conflated in the minds of the world' that references to antisemitism and the Holocaust will come to be seen as 'just a political defense of Israeli policy'." Judt stated that he "[doesn't] know anyone in a respectable range of opinion who thinks Israel shouldn't exist"; The New York Times noted that his advocacy for a binational solution to the Israel-Palestinian conflict is seen by many Jews as equivalent to dissolving Israel.

The New York Times also queried Tony Kushner for his reaction. "'Most Jews like me find this a very painful subject,' Mr. Kushner said, and are aware of the rise in vicious anti-Semitism around the world but feel 'it's morally incumbent upon us to articulate questions and reservations.'"

The original article in The New York Times described the American Jewish Committee, the organization that released the essay, as a "conservative advocacy group". The AJC promptly contested this characterization, which others did as well. In response, the newspaper issued a correction making clear that "[the AJC's] stance on issues ranges across the political spectrum; it is not 'conservative'."

Alvin Rosenfeld was highly critical of The New York Times' coverage, alleging that the article on the whole was misleading and incorrectly framed his argument, the admitted mischaracterization of the AJC was just one example. The mischaracterization, according to Rosenfeld, even includes the title of the article, which describes the targets of his critical essay as 'Liberal Jews' when, Rosenfeld wrote, "I never referred to liberal Jews, if you read my piece carefully you simply won't find the phrase." Gershom Gorenberg concurs with this criticism writing that the "essay itself refers to 'progressives', a group that overlaps with liberals but is not synonymous". The misleading coverage, Rosenfeld wrote, "reduced my argument to a kind of Left-Right, Conservative-Liberal face off" and led to many people misreading the essay.

== Other news coverage ==
In early February 2007, Stacey Palevsky observed, in a report for the j. the Jewish news weekly of Northern California, "Everyone seems to be talking about it":

Journalists and Jews alike apparently are all trying to figure 'it' out – when does criticism of Israel evolve from legitimate to anti-Semitic? Why are progressive, liberal organizations increasingly tolerant of anti-Zionist language and actions? What does the rise of "new anti-Semitism" mean for Jews and for the Jewish state? And are Jews themselves contributing to anti-Semitic rhetoric? Or is such a charge contrary to the Jewish tradition of freethinking?

Ben Harris, in a late February 2007 report for j. the Jewish news weekly of Northern California, wrote "the essay may be having the opposite of its intended effect" instead galvanizing "progressive" Jewish groups who feel "it is immoral to remain silent in the face of what they see as Israel's mistreatment of the Palestinians." Harris quotes Philip Weiss: "Things are changing.... My perception is that the Jewish community, the Jewish progressives, are feeling licensed and rising up." Weiss himself notes two recent developments: the launch by Jewish Voice for Peace of the Muzzlewatch Project dedicated to chronicling the alleged suppression of criticism of Israel, and the failure of the Zionist Organization of America to oust a liberal Jewish group from a national pro-Israel alliance.

Rebecca Spence wrote in The Forward that there was a similar ongoing debate in the UK, where, "Saying that Britain's mainstream Jewish groups have stifled a free discourse on Israeli policies, about 130 generally leftist Jews have formed their own group, Independent Jewish Voices."

== Other responses ==
=== Praise and support ===
Shulamit Reinharz wrote in a column for the Jewish Advocate, "Most would say that they are simply anti-Zionists, not anti-Semites. But I disagree, because in a world where there is only one Jewish state, to oppose it vehemently is to endanger Jews."

Gil Troy wrote an opinion article in New York's The Jewish Week praising the essay and criticizing its critics:

Finally, rather than treating the essay as an honest analysis of a painful, complex issue, critics accused the AJC of stifling the debate. Such hysteria makes intellectuals look spoiled, thin-skinned and brittle. Best-selling authors like Noam Chomsky or billionaires like George Soros ritualistically applaud their own bravery and pretend they are lonely voices when joining the trendy intellectual pile-on against Israel. How it is that people who viciously criticize Israel and Zionism, who lecture the Jewish world about tolerating diverse opinions, suddenly cannot stomach vigorous debate when they are criticized? Nothing in the AJC essay advocates hate laws, suppressing free speech, shunning, or any other intimidation. Professor Rosenfeld did what thinkers are supposed to do – identify, catalogue, analyze, explain, and challenge.

Lee Adlerstein wrote an opinion article for The Forward titled "Alvin Rosenfeld Is Right About Liberals And The Jewish State":

People should and do have a constitutional right to criticize Israel, even harshly, including challenging its right to exist. There must be robust debate about the wisdom of Israel's policies, and there is much to criticize.

However, this is not a normal time and we are not permitted to ignore reality. Searing criticism rightly branded as delegitimization of Israel is truly dangerous, all the more painfully so when it comes from Jews. The community, given its own right of expression, should decry defamations of this kind.

For commentators with a public audience to delegitimize Israel at this time is hurtful, undermines existing needed support and, at least in that manner, encourages Israel's enemies. We should and must say so – as Alvin Rosenfeld has done.

David Harris was happy with the reaction the essay received: “The individuals Rosenfeld mentions are on the political fringes in asserting that Israel has no right to exist and should either be destroyed or morphed into a so-called binational state, which means the end of Israel as we know it."

Jonathan Tobin wrote in The Jewish World Review that "Rosenfeld is careful to specify that questioning policies of Israeli governments is not the same as being anti-Israel, let alone anti-Semitic. But he has the bad manners to point out that those who aggressively question Israel's right to have any government or to defend itself against those who seek to destroy it are, at best, unwitting allies of a growing anti-Jewish movement.... For this, Rosenfeld and his sponsors at AJC have been treated to the sort of public tar and feathering that is usually reserved only for the troglodyte denizens of the far-right." Tobin concludes "in recent years, it is the supporters of Israel who are becoming pariahs in intellectual circles, not its critics. For all the talk of 'martyrdom' on the part of people like Tony Judt, the fact is, they have not suffered one bit for pot shots at Israel or their sneers at those who stand up for Zion. If we want to know where we are headed, we need only look to Britain, where in intellectual and artistic circles it has gotten to the point where it may no longer be possible to identify as a Jew without also disavowing any support for Israel."

Edward Alexander wrote in the New York Post in support: "When people like NYU's Tony Judt, the most vociferous and self-righteous of Rosenfeld's critics, issue their monthly calls for politicide in Israel, which they demonize as the sole 'anachronistic' state in an otherwise progressive multicultural world, don't they sense, even subconsciously, a potential kinship with the genocidally inclined (and not-at-all progressive) president of Iran? In law, such kinship is called 'accessory to murder'."

=== Criticism ===
Patricia Cohen noted similarities between Rosenfeld's essay and what Alan Wolfe calls "Jewish Illiberalism", which "traces the heated language to increasing opposition to the Iraq war and President Bush's policy in the Middle East, which [according to Wolfe] had spurred liberal Jews to become more outspoken about Israel". Wolfe stated, "Events in the world have sharpened a sense of what's at stake." Wolfe claimed that Israel was "more isolated than ever", with the effect of "causing American Jewish defenders of Israel to become more aggressive".

Richard Cohen responded via his regular Washington Post column published on February 6, 2007. Cohen noted that he has dedicated more than 90 columns to condemning antisemitism since he started as a columnist in 1976, "most of them full-throated condemnations of the hatred that killed fully one-third of all Jews during my lifetime. So it comes as a surprise that has the force of a mugging to be accused of aiding the very people I so hate – of being an abettor of something called The New Anti-Semitism." Cohen wrote that the report "has given license to the most intolerant and narrow-minded of Israel's defenders so that, as the AJC concedes in my case, any veering from orthodoxy is met with censure or, from someone like Reinharz, the most powerful of all post-Holocaust condemnations – anti-Semite – is diluted beyond recognition. The offense here is not just to a handful of relatively unimportant writers, but to memory itself."

Douglas Rushkoff responded to the essay on his blog on January 1, 2007, stating, "In their new whitepaper, [The American Jewish Committee] blame[s] 'progressive Jews', and yours truly by name, for promoting the extinction of the Jewish people. Of course, in my opinion, it is their racist and triumphalist stance that represents the antithesis of the Mosaic insights – and the greatest threat to what it was Jews have to offer the world in the first place."

Holocaust scholar Michael Berenbaum said, "I think it's a hodge-podge. ... I'm not sure how this advances discourse or debate. The question you must ask is, what do you gain by not engaging the discourse but by labeling and targeting it this way?"

In The Washington Post, Susan Jacoby wrote, "This is in fact a sign that the American Jewish right is afraid that it is losing ground within the Jewish community. In their political alliance with the Christian Right over all issues related to Israel – forged, ironically, because Protestant fundamentalists regard Israel as the place where Jesus will return on Judgment Day – ultra-conservative Jews have broken with the best Jewish traditions of social conscience and social consciousness.... Right-wing Jews have had to deny this vibrant, socially compassionate part of the Jewish past to justify their politics. So they promulgate the idea that liberal Jews, Jews who raise any questions about Israeli policies, are bad Jews."

On January 7, 2007, Daniel Sieradski appeared on Beyond the Pale, a progressive Jewish radio program that airs on Pacifica Radio, along with Esther Kaplan and Sara Roy, both of whom are mentioned in the report, to discuss both its alleged inaccuracies and perceived hostilities towards the progressive Jewish community.

Also in response to the essay, Michael Lerner wrote, "instead of seriously engaging with the issues raised (e.g., to what extent are Israel's current policies similar to those of apartheid and to what extent are they not?), the Jewish establishment and media responds by attacking the people who raise these or any other critiques – shifting the discourse to the legitimacy of the messenger and thus avoiding the substance of the criticisms. Knowing this, many people become fearful that they too will be labeled 'anti-Semitic' if they question the wisdom of Israeli policies or if they seek to organize politically to challenge those policies."

"The Jewish establishment has turned Judaism into a cheer-leading religion for a particular national state that has a lot of Jews, but has seriously lost sight of the Jewish values which early Zionists hoped would find realization there." Lerner warns, "when this bubble of repression of dialogue explodes into open resentment at the way Jewish Political correctness has been imposed, it may really yield a 'new' anti-Semitism. To prevent that, the voices of dissent on Israeli policy must be given the same national exposure in the media and American politics that the voices of the Jewish establishment have been given."

Rabbi Arthur Waskow said that far from enabling antisemitism, most of the authors the AJC attacked (Tony Kushner, Adrienne Rich, and Daniel Boyarin, among others) are in fact major contributors to the renewal and revitalization of Jewish culture, cutting across the conventional Jewish diaspora and religious-secular divides. He holds that Rosenfeld and the AJC see no value in such contributions because they see Jewish value only in supporting the policies of the State of Israel. He also argued that the AJC has done far more to undermine Israel and its Jewishness than the questions raised by these intellectuals, by the AJC's support for some specific policy decisions by the U.S. and Israeli governments: especially the Iraq War, which has increased dangers to Israel, and the settlement of hundreds of thousands of Israeli Jews into Palestinian areas.

==== Rosenfeld's response ====
Rosenfeld responded to his critics via a piece published in The New Republic and in an interview published on the CampusJ blog.

He wrote that many of his critics mischaracterize the argument he puts forth in his essay in a manner similar to what Rosenfeld wrote was an erroneous portrayal in The New York Times. He explains: "Since I never once referred to 'liberalism', called no one a 'Jewish anti-Semite' or 'self-hating Jew', said nothing about Democrats or the Iraq war, and made no attempt to 'silence' anyone, this Kafkaesque bill of indictment makes me wonder what is at play here – illiteracy, dishonesty, or worse? As Bret Stephens recently put it, 'How does joining a debate become an effort to suppress it?' Rosenfeld denied it, stating that, "Nobody's being silenced. ... I think its a red herring to talk about silencing, this debate in fact is evidence of a robust and open discussion".

Rosenfeld argued that there was a "dialectical scam" among the far-left critics of Israel:

The ubiquitous rubric "criticism of Israel", however, has also come to designate another kind of discourse – one that has almost become a politico-rhetorical genre unto itself, with its own identifiable vocabulary, narrative conventions, and predictable outcomes. At its ideational core is what the British scholar Bernard Harrison calls a "dialectical scam". It goes something like this: (1) Spot an Israeli action that can serve as the ground of "criticism of Israel" (e.g., Israel's military incursion into the area near Jenin in April 2002 in response to Palestinian terrorist massacres); (2) Then "dissent" in the strongest possible terms, for instance by likening the "razing of Jenin" to the destruction of the Warsaw Ghetto, while anticipating that "powerful" and "repressive" Jewish institutions will try to "silence" the critics by calling them anti-Semites; (3) When taken to task by more sober-minded critics who find that, contrary to your charge, there was no such thing as "the razing of Jenin" and that the IDF has nothing in common with the SS, cry "foul" and claim their censure perfectly illustrates the point that there really is a Jewish organizational conspiracy to silence "criticism of Israel" by branding the authors of such criticism "antisemites".

For some, this dialectical scam works nicely and validates their sense of themselves as intellectual martyrs suffering for a higher ideological cause. Once one is on to it, however, the scam readily dissolves into what it actually is: political bias, compounded by a touch of hysteria, masquerading as victimization. Thus, when a tiny political group calling itself "Jewish Voice for Peace" sets out to track "a growing epidemic of intimidation and harassment from fellow Jews seeking to stifle open debate over America's policy toward Israel", it can hardly be expected to be taken seriously.

=== Mixed responses ===
Gershom Gorenberg of The American Prospect praised Rosenfeld's idea, but criticized the delivery and organization as "sloppy":

Rosenfeld's own sloppiness hurts him. While attacking vituperative opponents of Israel who call themselves "progressive", he identifies their views with all who call themselves progressives – rather like letting James Dobson define what "Christian" means. He fires the shotgun of his criticism at such a wide flock of writers that his reader can wonder where he is aiming. Does The Washington Post's pro-Israel columnist Richard Cohen really belong to the same ideological species as those who accuse Israel of genocide?

The blurriness is a shame, because Rosenfeld has a legitimate argument. He explicitly rejects the view that any attack on Israeli policy equals anti-Semitism. Rather, his intended target is those Jews who reject the very existence of a Jewish state, and who express their opposition in shrieks that rise to equating Israel with the Nazis.

John Judis, a senior editor at The New Republic and a visiting scholar at the Carnegie Endowment for International Peace, wrote:

There is a paradox that haunts these charges of anti-Semitism. On the one hand, Rosenfeld, Harris, and others want to deny that American Jews and American Jewish organizations like AIPAC [American Israel Public Affairs Committee] suffer from dual loyalty in trying to influence U.S. foreign policy. It's anti-Semitic or contributes to anti-Semitism, they say, to make that charge. On the other hand, they want to demand of American Jewish intellectuals a certain loyalty to Israel, Israeli policies, and to Zionism as part of their being Jewish. They make dual loyalty an inescapable part of being Jewish in a world in which a Jewish state exists. And that's probably the case. Many Jews now suffer from dual loyalty – the same way that Cuban-Americans or Mexican-Americans do. By ignoring this dilemma – and, worse still, by charging those who acknowledge its existence with anti-Semitism – the critics of the new anti-Semitism are engaged in a flight from their own political selves.

== See also ==
- Jewish left
- The Left's Jewish Problem, a 2016 book by Dave Rich about the British Left
