= Vered Noam =

Israeli Talmudic scholar (born 1960)

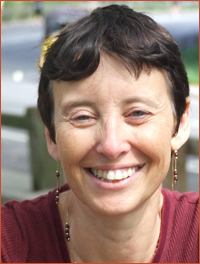
Vered Noam

Vered Noam (Hebrew: ורד נועם) is a professor of Talmud at Tel Aviv University. In 2020, she received the Israel Prize for Talmud, the first woman to receive the prize in Talmud studies.

== Biography ==
Vered Noam was born in Jerusalem in 1960 to Professor Yehuda Elitzur and children's author Rivka Elitzur. In 1985 she earned her BA in Talmud and Archaeology; in 1989 she earned her MA in Talmud; and in 1997 she earned her PhD in Talmud –– all of these degrees having been completed at the Hebrew University of Jerusalem. The topic of her doctorate was Megillat Ta'anit and its Scholion. She has been on the faculty of the department of Jewish Philosophy and Talmud at Tel Aviv University since 1999.

In 2008, she was appointed Associate Professor and in 2014 she was promoted to full Professor. Since 2017 she has served as chair of the Chaim Rosenberg School of Jewish Studies and Archaeology at Tel Aviv University. Noam has also held a visiting appointment in the Jewish Studies program at Yale University.

Noam serves as an editor of the Jewish studies journal Zion (ציון) and is on the editorial boards of the Journal of Ancient Judaism and Dead Sea Discoveries.

She has written on the Dead Sea Scrolls and their influence on Rabbinic Judaism, and on how tales of Judea's Hasmonean rulers were recounted by Josephus and the later Babylonian rabbis of the Talmud.

== Publications ==
- Megillat Ta’anit: Versions, Interpretation, History Yad Ben-Zvi Press, 2003 (Hebrew).
- From Qumran to the Rabbinic Revolution: Conceptions of Impurity Yad Ben-Zvi Press, 2010 (Hebrew).
- Shifting Images of the Hasmoneans: Second Temple Legends and Their Reception in Josephus and Rabbinic Literature. Oxford University Press, 2018.
- Vered Noam's List of Publications
