= Hartmut Zinser =

German religious studies scholar

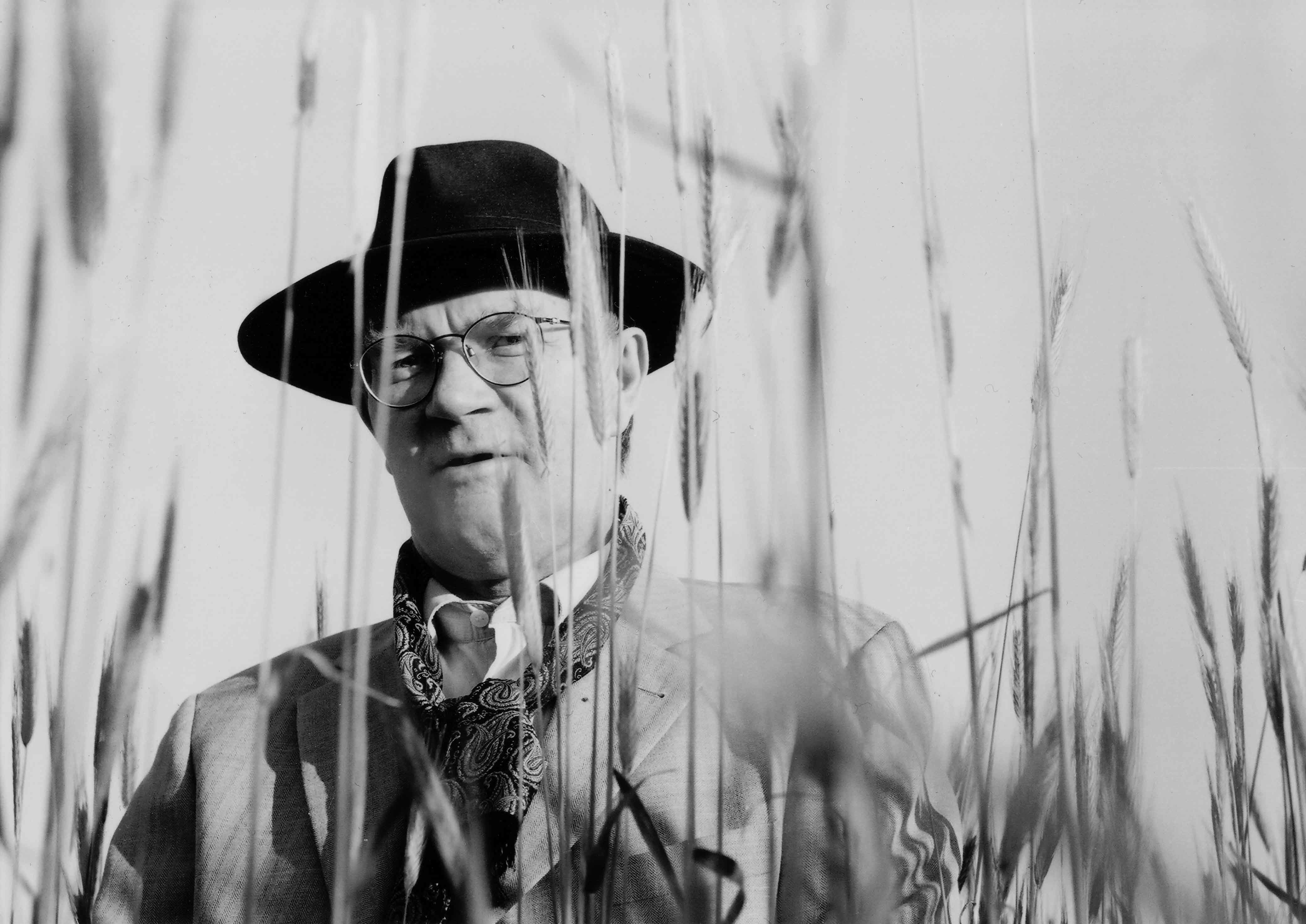
- Born: 11 November 1944 (age 81); Tübingen, Germany
- Scientific career
- Fields: Religious Studies
- Workplaces: Free University of Berlin

Hartmut Zinser (born 11 November 1944 in Tübingen, Germany) is a German scholar in the field of religious studies, history of religions, and ethnology.

== Biography ==
=== Education and career ===
Zinser studied religious studies at the Free University of Berlin, at the time West Berlin, West Germany, where he received his PhD in 1975 and made his post-doctorate in 1980. From 1984 to 1988 he had a Professorship for religious studies at the Free University of Berlin and, after a short break (professorship for ethnology in Mainz from 1989 to 1990), received a call to the Free University in 1990 where he has been a professor at the Institute for the Scientific Study of Religion ever since.

=== Other activities ===
From 1984 to 1993 Zinser was a board member of the German Association of the History of Religions ("Deutschen Vereinigung für Religionsgeschichte", DVRG). From 1996 to 1998 he was a member of the German Federal Parliament's Inquiry Committee on "So-called Religious and Psycho Cults". In 1998 he was Vice-President of the European Association for the Scientific Study of Religion ("Association Européen pour l'Étude scientifique des Religions") and an elected fellow of the Society for the Scientific Study of Religion in the United States. In 2002 he was chairman of the Berlin Association for Anthropology ("Berliner Gesellschaft für Anthropologie, Ethnologie und Urgeschichte").

== Fields of Interest ==
Zinser's fields of interest lie in the European history of religion since the French Revolution and the field of atheism and criticism of religion, as well as the history of ancient Roman religion, ancient Christianity, myths and their traditions, and Primitive religions; furthermore, he works on the systematic scientific study of religion.

From 2006 to 2009 Zinser was co-supervisor of the research project "From imperial museum to communication center" ("Vom Imperialmuseum zum Kommunikationszentrum"; in co-operation with Lidia Guzy, Rainer Hatoum und Susan Kamel). Since 2009 he is supervising a research project about the (so-called) "New Atheism" ("The 'Return of Religion' and the Return of the Criticism of Religion - The 'New Atheism' in recent German and American culture"), founded by the Deutsche Forschungsgemeinschaft ("German Research Foundation") in cooperation with Ulf Plessentin and Thomas Zenk. Other members of the Zinser team are Márcia Moser and Maud Sieprath. In February 2010 Zinser has begun a third research project; Clarissa Busse will examine the life and work of the German-Jewish professor Marianne Awerbuch (whose diaries have previously been edited and published by Zinser).

== Publications ==
=== Books by Hartmut Zinser ===
- Grundfragen der Religionswissenschaft. Schöningh, Paderborn 2010, ISBN 978-3-506-76898-8.
- Esoterik. Eine Einführung. Fink, München 2009, ISBN 978-3-7705-4874-3.
- 'Kollektives Unbewußtes' und 'Freie Assoziation'. Zur Psychoanalyse in der Kultur- und Religionswissenschaft. Medien Verlag Köhler, Tübingen 2000, ISBN 3-932694-87-2.
- Religion in der schulischen Bildung und Erziehung. (zus. mit K. E. Grözinger und B. Gladigow), Berliner Wissenschafts-Verlag, Berlin 1999, ISBN 978-3-8305-0038-4.
- Der Markt der Religionen. Fink, München 1997, ISBN 978-3-7705-3257-5.
- Mythos des Mutterrechts. Verhandlung von drei aktuellen Theorien des Geschlechterkampfes. 2. Aufl. Lit Verlag, Münster 1996, ISBN 3-8258-2554-X.
- Esoterik und New Age: Herausforderungen an die Jugend- und Erwachsenenbildung. (zus. mit T. Ewald, H.-G. Jaschke), Hessische Landeszentrale für Politische Bildung, Wiesbaden 1996.
- Jugendokkultismus in Ost und West. Vier quantitative Untersuchungen zu Okkultpraktiken unter Jugendlichen und jungen Erwachsenen in Berlin 1989 - 1991. Ergebnisse - Tabellen – Analysen. München 1993, ISBN 3-927890-06-5.
- Okkultismus unter Jugendlichen. (zus. mit M. Knief), Pädag. Zentrum Berlin, Berlin 1992.
- Mythos und Arbeit. Heymann Verlag, Wiesbaden 1977, ISBN 978-3-88055-029-2.

=== Books and References on Hartmut Zinser ===
- Hildegard Piegeler/Inken Prohl/Stefan Rademacher (Hrsg.):Gelebte Religionen. Festschrift für Hartmut Zinser, Königshausen & Neumann, Würzburg 2004, ISBN 978-3-8260-2768-0.
- Kürschners Deutscher Gelehrten-Kalender: Geistes- und Sozialwissenschaften, de Gruyter, Berlin 2001, ISBN 3-11-014914-1.
