= Journal for the Study of the Pseudepigrapha =

- Discipline: Pseudepigrapha
- Language: English
- Edited by: Matthias Henze

Publication details
- History: 1987-present
- Publisher: SAGE Publications
- Frequency: Quarterly

Standard abbreviations
- ISO 4: J. Study Pseudepigr.

Indexing
- ISSN: 0951-8207 (print); 1745-5286 (web)
- LCCN: sn91013291
- OCLC no.: 17504095

Links
- Journal homepage; Online access; Online archive

Journal for the Study of the Pseudepigrapha is a quarterly peer-reviewed academic journal that publishes scholarship on Jewish literature from the Hellenistic-Roman period. The journal operates a double-blind review process. Contributions focus on linguistic, textual, historic or theological insights to the Jewish literature found in, but not limited to, the pseudepigrapha and apocrypha. The editor-in-chief is Matthias Henze (Rice University). It was established in 1987 and is currently published by SAGE Publications.

Editorial Board: Randall D. Chesnutt (Malibu, CA), John J. Collins (New Haven, CT), Sidnie White Crawford (Lincoln, NE), John R. Levison (Seattle, WA), Hermann Lichtenberger (Tübingen). Liv Ingeborg Lied (Oslo), Doron Mendels (Jerusalem), Carol Newsom (Atlanta, GA), Eileen Schuller (Hamilton, Ontario), Michael E. Stone (Jerusalem), Benjamin Wold (Dublin), Archie T. Wright (Virginia Beach, CA).

== Abstracting and indexing ==
The Journal for the Study of the Pseudepigrapha is abstracted and indexed in:

- Academic Premier
- Advanced Placement Source
- ATLA Religion Database
- New Testament Abstracts
- Old Testament Abstracts
- Religion & Philosophy Collection
