= James R. Davila =

American biblical scholar

James R. Davila (born 1960) is an American biblical scholar. He is Professor of Early Jewish Studies and former Principal of St Mary's College, St Andrews. A specialist in Second Temple Judaism and Old Testament Pseudepigrapha, Davila is a participant at the Enoch seminar and a member of the advisory board of the journal Henoch.

== Education ==
Davila received his B.A. from the University of California, Los Angeles Department of Near Eastern Languages and Cultures in 1982, his M.A. from the same institution in 1983, and his Ph.D. from the Harvard University Department of Near Eastern Languages and Civilizations in 1988. All degrees were awarded summa cum laude. His doctoral thesis was entitled "Unpublished Pentateuchal Manuscripts from Cave IV, Qumran: 4QGenExa, Genb-h, Genj-k". He was elevated to Professor of Early Jewish Studies at St Mary's College, University of St Andrews in May 2008.

Screen Credit

Davila has one television and one movie credit to his name. Davila was credited as Jimmy Davila during his acting career. He appeared in one episode of The Walton's in 1973 called "The Fawn" where he portrayed Harold Beasley. He appeared in the 1975 movie "The Hindenburg" where his character "Flakus" was uncredited.

== Publications ==
Davila has authored, contributed, or edited numerous books and articles.

=== Books ===
- The Provenance of the Pseudepigrapha: Jewish, Christian, or Other?. Leiden; Boston, MA: Brill Publishers. 2005. ISBN 978-90-04-13752-3. LCCN 2005052633. OCLC 61309430.
- Descenders to the chariot: the people behind the Hekhalot literature. Leiden; Boston, MA: Brill Publishers. 2001. ISBN 978-90-04-11541-5. LCCN 2001046476. OCLC 47756234.
- Liturgical works. Grand Rapids, Michigan: William B. Eerdmans Publishing Company. 2000. ISBN 978-0-8028-4380-7. LCCN 00049471. OCLC 45136613.
