= Damascus Document =

Ancient Jewish Document

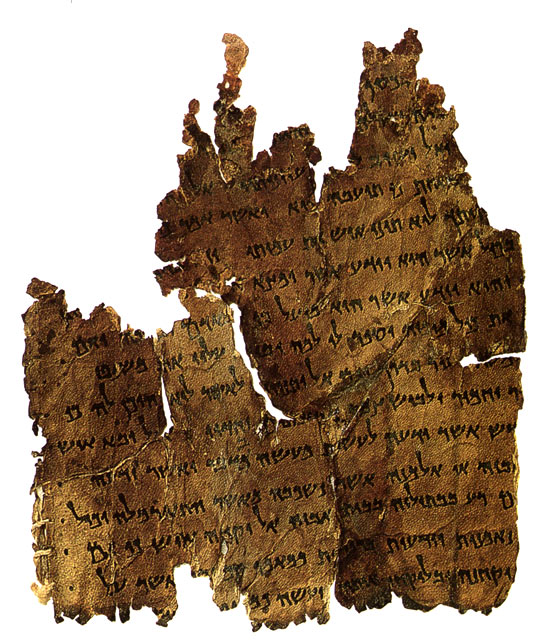
The Damascus Document Scroll, 4Q271D^{f}, found in Cave 4 at Qumran

The Damascus Document (Note: It is known by several names: Damascus Covenant, Zadokite Fragments, or Cairo Damascus Document. The Cairo recension is labelled CD and that of Qumran QD.) is an ancient Hebrew text known from both the Cairo Geniza and the Dead Sea Scrolls. It is considered one of the foundational documents of the ancient Jewish community of Qumran.

The Damascus Document is a fragmentary text, no complete version of which survives. There have been attempts to reconstruct the original text from the various fragments. The medieval recension appears to have been shorter than the Qumran version, but where they overlap there is little divergence. The correct ordering of all the Qumran fragments is not certain.

The Damascus Document's primary body of composition is a compilation of sectarian laws that have been coupled with historical information on the sect, and utilize the same figure names used in the group's pesharim commentaries. As the rules permit a woman to marry and possess private property, most scholars believe that they were composed to determine the lifestyles of the Essenes who lived in the camps and did not join the Qumran community. The redactor of the text allows that the covenant is open to all Israelites who accept the sect's halakha, while condemning the others as the "wicked of Judah" against whom God would direct "a great anger with flames of fire by the hand of all the angels of destruction against persons turning aside from the path". The text states that those who abandon the true covenant "will not live".

== Name ==
The fragments found in Cairo in 1897 were originally called the Zadokite Fragments but after the work was found at Qumran, the name was changed because the document had numerous references to Damascus. The way this Damascus is treated in the document makes it possible that it was not a literal reference to Damascus in Syria, but to be understood either geographically for Babylon or Qumran itself. If symbolic, it is probably taking up the Biblical language found in Amos 5:27, "therefore I shall take you into exile beyond Damascus"; Damascus was part of Israel under King David, and the Damascus Document expresses an eschatological hope of the restoration of a Davidic monarchy.

== Discovery ==
Two manuscripts (CDa and CDb) were found in Cairo, with further findings at Qumran. In contrast to the fragments found at Qumran, the CD documents are largely complete, and therefore are vital for reconstructing the text.

=== Cairo Geniza ===
The main fragments were discovered by Solomon Schechter in 1897 in the Cairo Geniza, a storeroom adjoining Ben Ezra Synagogue in Fustat (Old Cairo), among over 190,000 manuscripts and fragments that were written in mainly Hebrew and Judaeo-Arabic. The fragments were quite large, and a number of them matched documents found later in Qumran. They were divided into two separate sections, CDa, and CDb. Schechter dated CDa to the 10th century C.E and CDb to 11th or 12th century C.E. These fragments are housed at the Cambridge University Library with the classmarks T-S 10K6 and T-S 16.311 (other references are CDa and CDb).

=== Qumran scrolls ===
The fragments from Qumran have been assigned the document references 4Q266-73 (pictured above), 5Q12, and 6Q15.

== Structure ==
The combined text of CDa and CDb contains twenty columns of writing. As it has come down to us, two columns have been mislocated: columns 15 & 16 originally preceded col 9. Fragments from Qumran include material not found in CD (the Cairo manuscripts).

The Damascus Document can be divided into two separate sections, commonly called Admonition and Laws. Davies divides the Admonition into four sections: History, Legal, Warnings, a Supplement (which Wise refers to as exhortations). The Admonition comprises moral instruction, exhortation, and warning addressed to members of the sect, together with polemic against its opponents; it serves as a kind of introduction to the second section.

The Laws feature Oaths & vows, Sundry rulings (halakhot), Camp laws, and a fragment of Penal codes (more of which were found in the Qumran fragments).

=== The Admonition ===
This part is divided into four subsections.

A. Admonition (columns 1–8 + 19–20)

1. History (1.1–4.12a)
Background to the community
A description of the community and how they originated, with their purpose and an appeal to join them.

2. Legal (4.12b–7.9)
The significance of being outside and inside the community, some of the laws
The position of people in and outside the community in regard to the law. Those outside are straying from the law, while their community is based on the law, which is strict, but offers salvation.

3. Warnings (7.5–8.19)
Includes the Three Nets of Belial
Expands on the original Admonition. Criticises of the "princes of Judah", i.e. the mainstream religious authorities.

4. Supplement or exhortations (19.33–20.34)
Discusses apostasy, disobedience, further warnings and a promise to the faithful
Further expansion of the Admonition. A new group with a Teacher appears, calling themselves the "new covenant". Davies identifies them with the Qumran group.

=== The Laws ===
The first 12 laws are from the Damascus Document found at Qumran, while the others are from the Cairo Geniza.

B. Laws (columns 15-16 + 9–14)

1. Oaths and vows (15.1–9.10a)
Taking oaths, becoming a member of the community, offerings and vows to God

2. Sundry rulings (9.10b–12.22a)
Rules regarding witnesses, purity and purification, the Sabbath, sacrifices, gentiles and impure foods

3. Camp laws (12.22b–14.18a)
Laws for life in the camp, qualification for an overseer, relations with outsiders, ranks and needs of camp members

4. Penal code (14.18b–22)
Fragment concerning punishments

Another way to organise the laws would be:

1. Introduction: the new laws, priests, and overseer
2. Rules about priests and disqualification
3. Diagnosis of skin disease
4. Impurity from menstruation and childbirth
5. Levitical laws pertaining to harvest
6. Gleanings from grapes and olives
7. Fruits of the fourth year
8. Measures and Tithes
9. Impurity of Idolators metal, corpse impurity, and sprinkling
10. Wife suspected of adultery
11. Integrity with commercial dealings and marriage
12. Overseer of the camp
13. 15.1–15a: Oath to return to the law of Moses be those joining the covenant
14. 15.15b–20: Exclusion from the community on the basis of a physical defect
15. 16.1–20: Oath to enter the community, as well as laws concerning the taking of other oaths and vows
16. 9.1: Death to the one responsible for the death of a Jew using gentile courts of justice
17. 9.2–8: Laws about reproof and vengeance
18. 9.9–10.10a: Laws about oaths, lost articles and testimony and judges
19. 10.10b–13 Purification in water
20. 10.14–11.18 Regulations for keeping the Sabbath
21. 11.19–12.2a Laws for keeping the purity of the Temple
22. 12.2b–6a Dealing with transgressors
23. 12.6b–11a Relations with gentiles
24. 12.11b–15a Dietary laws
25. 12.15b–22a Two purity rules
26. 12.22b–14.19 Regulations for those in the camps
27. 14.20–22 Penal code dealing with infractions of communal discipline
28. Expulsion ceremony

== CD and the Community Rule ==
According to Charlotte Hempel, the relationship between the Damascus Document and the Community Rule "has been a central issue in Scrolls scholarship" ever since it became clear that the Damascus Document, which was already known before from the Cairo Geniza, is also represented in Qumran.

The Damascus Document contains prominent reference to a cryptic figure called the Teacher of Righteousness, whom some of the other Qumran scrolls treat as a figure from their past, and others treat as a figure in their present, and others still as a figure of the future. (Some of these other scrolls where he is mentioned are the Pesharim on Habakkuk (numerous times), Micah (once) and Psalms, as well as 4Q172.) The document introduces the group as having arisen 390 years after the first fall of Jerusalem, hence around 200 BCE, but attests that for the 20 years they "remained like blind men groping their way" until God "raised for them a Teacher of Righteousness to guide them in the way of His heart." On the basis of that reference, historians date the Teacher to circa 170-150 BCE. Scholars have also believed that he was a priest based on other variations in the text that are also thought to be him. These include: "the teacher", "the unique teacher" and "the interpreter of the law".

This Teacher of Righteousness does not feature at all, however, in the Community Rule, another document found amongst the Qumran scrolls. To some scholars, this suggests that the two works are of different Second Temple groups. Most scholars, however, focus on the high degree of shared terminology and legal rulings between the Damascus Document and the Community Rule, including terms like sons of light, and their penal codes and on the likelihood that fragment 4Q265 is a hybrid edition of both documents. They turn to the fact that the Damascus Document describes the group amongst whom the Document was created as having been leaderless for 20 years before the Teacher of Righteousness established his rule over the group to explain that both works are from the same group under different situations.

Within this approach of the majority of scholars, the textual relationship between the Damascus Document and Community Rule is not completely resolved, though there is a general agreement that they have some evolutionary connection. Some suspect that the Community Rule is the original text that was later altered to become the Damascus Document, others that the Damascus Document was redacted to become the Community Rule, a third group argues that the Community Rule was created as a utopian ideal rather than a practical replacement for the Damascus Document, and still others that believe the Community Rule and Damascus Document were written for different types of communities, one enclosed and the other open.

=== CD as a rewriting of the Community Rule ===
According to Annette Steudel (2012), the literary comparison of the Community Rule and the Damascus Document shows that the Damascus Document represents a rewriting of the Community Rule. She shows that the Damascus Document closely follows the text of the Community Rule, and specifically of the sections 1QS V-VII. Also she shows that the long Fourth Admonition in the Damascus Document is basically an elaboration of the passage 1QS V, l-7a.

Nevertheless, she also argues that this relationship between the two documents doesn't end there. Because there also appears to be a complex interplay between these two documents. A later passage in the Community Rule (1QS VIII-IX) might have been composed as a reaction to the rewriting/reinterpretation that was offered by the Damascus Document, as mentioned above. So, at a later stage, these two documents appear to be in a dialogue with each other.

The figure of the Teacher of Righteousness is not mentioned in the Community Rule as such. So he may be a later figure to appear in these two related communities.

== Views ==
Most scholars believe that the rules featured in the Damascus Document, which let men to marry women and own private property, were created to regulate the lifestyles of the Essenes who lived in the camps and did not join the Essene community that resided in Qumran.

According to Boccaccini, the Damascus Document serves as a "bridge" document, connecting Judaism's post-exilic 'Enochian'-Essene majority to the asserted leadership of its radical minority Qumran–Essene community that was established in isolation near the shores of the Dead Sea.

== Bibliography ==
- Boccaccini, Gabriele: Beyond the Essene Hypothesis: The Parting of the Ways between Qumran and Enochic Judaism . (Grand Rapids, Michigan: Eerdmans, 1998) ISBN 978-0802843609
- Broshi, Magen: The Damascus document reconsidered (Israel Exploration Society: Shrine of the Book, Israel Museum, 1992)
- Davies, P. R.: The Damascus covenant: an interpretation of the "Damascus document" (Sheffield: JSOT Press, 1983; Journal for the Study of the Old Testament, Supplement series 25)
- Davila, James R.: "The Damascus Document and the Community Rule " (University of St. Andrews, 2005)
- Ginzberg, L.: An Unknown Jewish Sect (New York: Jewish Theological Seminary of America, 1976, ©1970, ISBN 9780873340007); translated and expanded from Eine unbekannte jüdische Sekte (New York: Hildesheim, 1922, privately published)
- Hempel, Charlotte: The Damascus Texts (Sheffield: Sheffield Academic Press, 2000) ISBN 1-84127-055-5
- Kahle, Paul: The Cairo Genizah (Oxford: Blackwell, 1959)
- Rabin, C.: The Zadokite documents, 1: the admonition, 2: the laws (2nd ed. Oxford, 1958)
- Reif, Stefan: Article "Cairo Genizah", in Encyclopaedia of the Dead Sea Scrolls, Vol.1, ed LH Schiffman and JC VanderKam (Oxford: OUP: 2000) ISBN 0-19-513796-5
- Rowley, H. H.: The Zadokite fragments and the Dead Sea scrolls (Oxford: Blackwell, 1952)

Schechter, Solomon (1910). Documents of Jewish Sectaries. Vol. I. Fragments of a Zadokite work: edited from Hebrew manuscripts in the Cairo Genizah collection, now in the possession of the University Library, Cambridge. Cambridge University Press – via archive.org. 2 v.

- Smith, Barry: The Dead Sea Scrolls, Crandall University course
- Zeitlin, Solomon: The Zadokite fragments: facsimile of the manuscripts in the Cairo Genizah collection in the possession of the University Library, Cambridge, England (Philadelphia: Dropsie College, 1952)
- The Taylor-Schechter Genizah Collection website, by the dedicated research unit (Cambridge University)
