= Enoch Seminar =

The Enoch Seminar is an academic group of international specialists in Second Temple Judaism and the origins of Christianity who share information about their work in the field and biennially meet to discuss topics of common interest. The group is supported by the Department of Near Eastern Studies of the University of Michigan and the Michigan Center for Early Christian Studies, the group gathers about 200 university professors from more than fifteen countries.

== Overview ==
The Enoch Seminar focuses on the period of Jewish history, culture and literature from the Babylonian Exile (6th century BC) to the Bar-Kochba revolt (2nd century AD) —the period in which both Christianity and Rabbinic Judaism have their roots. It is a neutral forum where scholars who are specialized in different sub-fields (OT Apocrypha and Pseudepigrapha, Dead Sea Scrolls, Josephus, Philo, New Testament) and are committed to different methodologies, have the opportunity to meet, talk and listen to one another without being bound to adhere to any sort of preliminary agreement or reach any sort of preordained consensus.

Scholars at differing stages of their career, from graduate students to established scholars, can congregate and present their studies at the Enoch Seminar. Participation at the meetings of the Enoch Seminar is by invitation only and is restricted to University professors and specialists in Second Temple Judaism and Christian Origins who have completed their PhD. Papers circulate in advance among the participants and the entire time at the meetings is devoted to discussion in plenary sessions or small groups. Since 2006, to graduate students, PhD candidates and post-doctorate fellows, the Enoch Seminar has offered a separate biennial conference (the Enoch Graduate Seminar).

== Meetings ==
=== First Enoch Seminar (Florence 2001) ===
The First Enoch Seminar was held in Florence, Italy (19–23 June 2001) at the Villa Corsi-Salviati of the University of Michigan at Sesto Fiorentino.

The conference was organized by Gabriele Boccaccini (University of Michigan, USA) in consultation with the other founding members of the Enoch Seminar. It explored the role of the early Enoch literature in the time prior to the Maccabean revolt and probed the hypothesis of the existence of "Enochic Judaism" as a distinctive form of Judaism in the early Second Temple period.

The Proceeding were published in 2002 by Zamorani.

=== Second Enoch Seminar (Venice 2003) ===
The second Enoch Seminar was held in Venice, Italy (1–4 July 2003) at Palazzo Sullam.

The conference was organized by Gabriele Boccaccini (University of Michigan, USA), in consultation with the other senior members of the Enoch Seminar. It focused on the role played by the Enoch literature in shaping the ideology and the practice of the Essene movement and the Qumran community.

The Proceeding were published in 2005 by Eerdmans. An additional volume on the early Enoch literature was planned and published in 2007 by Brill Publishers.
The second Enoch Seminar at Venice was followed by a conference on Jewish and Christian messianism, Il Messia tra memoria e attesa, jointly organized with the Italian biblical association BIBLIA. The proceedings of the meeting were published in 2005 by Morcelliana.

=== Third Enoch Seminar (Camaldoli 2005) ===
The Third Enoch Seminar was held at Camaldoli, Italy (6–10 June 2005) at the Foresteria of the Camaldoli Monastery.

The conference was organized by Gabriele Boccaccini (University of Michigan, USA) in consultation with the other senior members of the Enoch Seminar. It focused on the ideology and date of the Parables of Enoch as a Second Jewish document and on its message about the coming of the heavenly messiah "Son of Man."

The Proceeding were published in 2007 by Eerdmans.

=== Fourth Enoch Seminar (Camaldoli-Ravenna 2007) ===
The Proceedings were published in 2009 by Eerdmans and by the Journal Henoch.

=== Fifth Enoch Seminar (Naples 2009) ===
The Proceedings were published in 2012 by Brill and by the Journal Henoch.

=== Sixth Enoch Seminar (Milan 2011) ===
The Sixth Enoch Seminar was held at the Ambrosiana Library and concentrated on first century Jewish apocalypses such as 2 Baruch and 4 Ezra.

=== Seventh Enoch Seminar (Camaldoli 2013) ===
The Seventh Enoch Seminar was held in Camaldoli, Italy and focused on Enochic influence on the Synoptic Gospels.

=== Eight Enoch Seminar (Milan 2015) ===
The Eight Enoch Seminar was held at the Villa Cagnola in Gazzada, Italy, close to Milan. Organized by Daniel Boyarin, Lorenzo DiTommaso, and Elliot Wolfson, it focused on apocalypticism and mysticism among Christians and Jewish in Antiquity and the early Medieval period.

=== Ninth Enoch Seminar (Camaldoli 2017) ===
The Ninth Enoch Seminar, held in Camaldoli, Italy, was chaired by William Schniedewind and Jason Zurawski. The meeting studied the understanding of Torah during the time of the Hebrew Bible and Second Temple Judaism.

=== Tenth Enoch Seminar (Florence 2019) ===
The Tenth Enoch Seminar at Florence, Italy was chaired by Gabriele Boccaccini and Annette Reed. Loren Stuckenbruck and Shaul Magid were speakers at the event.
