= Charlotte Fonrobert =

Stanford University, Religious Studies

Charlotte Elisheva Fonrobert
- Born: Düsseldorf, West Germany

Academic background
- Education: Graduate Theological Union
- Doctoral advisor: Daniel Boyarin
- Website: Stanford Faculty Page

Charlotte Elisheva Fonrobert (born 1965 in Düsseldorf, West Germany) is a professor in the Religious Studies department of Stanford University. She specializes in Judaism, especially talmudic literature and culture. Her research interests include gender in Jewish culture, the relationship between Judaism and Christianity in Late Antiquity, the discourses of orthodoxy versus heresy, and rabbinic conceptions of Judaism with respect to Greco-Roman culture. She completed her graduate training at the Graduate Theological Union in Berkeley, California. In 2007 she wrote the article Gender Identity In Halakhic Discourse for Jewish Women: A Comprehensive Historical Encyclopedia; this is likely the first scholarly article on the topic. In 2009, she was named to the inaugural membership of the Shalom Hartman Institute North American Scholars Circle.

Fonrobert is the author of Menstrual Purity: Rabbinic and Christian Reconstructions of Biblical Gender (2000), which won the Salo Baron Prize for a best first book in Jewish Studies of the year and was a finalist for the National Jewish Book Award in Jewish Scholarship. She also wrote the essay "Regulating the Human Body: Rabbinic Legal Discourse and the Making of Jewish Gender", which was included in the book Balancing on the Mechitza: Transgender in Jewish Community, edited by Noach Dzmura, and in the book Keep Your Wives Away from Them: Orthodox Women, Unorthodox Desires: an Anthology, edited by Miryam Kabakov.

She is currently working on a project which examines the relationship between religious identity and space, ranging from urban neighborhoods to the wilderness, in Jewish and Christian Late Antiquity. As part of this project, she edited and introduced a collection of articles on the subject of "Jewish Conceptions and Practices of Space" together with Vered Shemtov (Stanford University). She also co-edited the Cambridge Companion to Rabbinic Literature, with Martin Jaffee (University of Washington). It contains, among other things, her essay "Regulating the Human Body: Rabbinic Legal Discourse and the Making of Jewish Gender."
