= Richard Cohen (columnist) =

American journalist

- Born: February 6, 1941 (age 85); New York City, New York
- Education: New York University (AB) Columbia University (MA)
- Occupation: Columnist

Richard Martin Cohen (born February 6, 1941) is an American writer best known for his syndicated column in The Washington Post, which he wrote from 1976 to 2019.

== Early life and education ==
Cohen was born to a Jewish family and is a graduate of Far Rockaway High School and attended Hunter College, New York University, and Columbia University. He served for two years in the U.S. Army, during the early 1960s.

== Career ==
Cohen worked for United Press International in New York.

He joined The Washington Post as a reporter in 1968 and later became the paper's chief Maryland correspondent. He covered the investigation of former vice president Spiro Agnew and wrote a book called A Heartbeat Away: The Investigation and Resignation of Vice President Spiro T. Agnew with fellow reporter Jules Witcover. In 1976, he began writing a column for the paper's Metro section, which became nationally syndicated in 1981.

In 1998, Cohen was involved in a dispute with editorial aide Devon Spurgeon that was ultimately mediated by Washington Post management. Cohen reportedly asked Spurgeon questions about "casual sex", told her to "stand up and turn around", and gave her the "silent treatment" for three weeks. Cohen contended that "it was a personality dispute at an office, but it had nothing to do with sexual harassment as the term applies today". Washington Post management concluded that Spurgeon had been subjected to a "hostile working environment" but not to "sexual harassment" and that Cohen was guilty of "inappropriate behavior".

He is a four-time Pulitzer Prize finalist in the "Commentary" category.

In his farewell column in The Washington Post, Cohen recalled: "Flying into Cairo for the first time, I looked out the window. A sandstorm obscured the pyramids, but I envisioned them anyway and could not get over the fact that I was being paid to see them." Jim Naureckas commented: "That sums up Cohen's career pretty well: It was his job to witness monumental matters; he didn’t actually see them, but wrote about them anyway—and got paid to do it."

== Opinions ==
=== Foreign policy ===
Cohen was originally a supporter of the Iraq War, and publicly supported the Bush administration in several other high-profile instances. In a 2003 Washington Post column, Cohen wrote, "The evidence Colin Powell presented to the United Nations – some of it circumstantial, some of it absolutely bone-chilling in its detail – had to prove to anyone that Iraq not only hasn't accounted for its weapons of mass destruction but without a doubt still retains them. Only a fool – or possibly a Frenchman – could conclude otherwise." Cohen also wrote that he believed "the prudent use of violence could be therapeutic" after the events of 9/11. Cohen has since expounded upon his former views of support for the Iraq War, and his later stance against it.

In his July 18, 2006, column he stated: "The greatest mistake Israel could make at the moment is to forget that Israel itself is a mistake. It is an honest mistake, a well-intentioned mistake, a mistake for which no one is culpable, but the idea of creating a nation of European Jews in an area of Arab Muslims (and some Christians) has produced a century of warfare and terrorism of the sort we are seeing now".

For this statement, Cohen was criticized in an essay released by the American Jewish Committee entitled 'Progressive' Jewish Thought and the New Anti-Semitism. He clarified his statements in the next week's column, saying, "Readers of my recent column on the Middle East can accuse me of many things, but not a lack of realism. I know Israel's imperfections, but I also exalt and admire its achievements. Lacking religious conviction, I fear for its future and note the ominous spread of European-style anti-Semitism throughout the Muslim world—and its boomerang return to Europe as a mindless form of anti-Zionism. Israel is, as I have often said, unfortunately located, gentrifying a pretty bad neighborhood. But the world is full of dislocated peoples, and we ourselves live in a country where the Indians were pushed out of the way so that—oh, what irony! – the owners of slaves could spread liberty and democracy from sea to shining sea. As for Europe, who today cries for the Greeks of Anatolia or the Germans of Bohemia?" In the same column, he defended Israel's military campaign in its 2006 war with Hezbollah in Lebanon along with its simultaneous fight against Hamas in Gaza.

Cohen states in his that "[Israel] sins. It is sometimes wrong. It accumulated land and space in vile yet ordinary ways. Israel is not evil. It is merely human.", while arguing that Israel has done nothing that other nations have not done.

=== CIA leak scandal ===
In 2007, he criticized the prosecution of Scooter Libby (in the Plame affair criminal investigation) as politically motivated, saying, "This is not an entirely trivial matter since government officials should not lie to grand juries, but neither should they be called to account for practicing the dark art of politics. As with sex or real estate, it is often best to keep the lights off". Cohen was in turn criticized by Media Matters for America and within the Columbia Journalism Review for factual errors in his presentation, including his contentions that Valerie Plame had not been a covert agent, and that "outing" Plame "turns out not to be a crime".

=== Racial issues ===
Cohen wrote a column in 1986 which argued owners of jewelry stores were right to refuse to allow entry to young Black men because of a fear of crime. This column led to The Washington Post having to apologize.

Following the acquittal of George Zimmerman for the killing of Trayvon Martin in July 2013, Cohen wrote "a controversial column in which he defends George Zimmerman's suspicion of Trayvon Martin and calls on politicians to acknowledge that a disproportionate amount of crimes are committed by black males". The column went on to say that Cohen "can understand why Zimmerman was suspicious and why he thought Martin was wearing a uniform we all recognize;" in any case, he also points out that "What I'm trying to deal with is, I'm trying to remove this fear from racism. I don't think it's racism to say, 'this person looks like a menace,'" he explained. "Now, a menace in another part of the country could be a white guy wearing a wife-beater under-shirt. Or, if you're a black guy in the South and you come around the corner and you see a member of the Ku Klux Klan". Towards the end of the column, Cohen calls Trayvon Martin "a young man understandably suspected because he was black".

On November 11, 2013, in the course of a column about New Jersey Governor Chris Christie, Cohen referred to the recent victory of Bill de Blasio as Mayor of New York City and de Blasio's wife Chirlane McCray writing:

People with conventional views must repress a gag reflex when considering the mayor-elect of New York – a white man married to a black woman and with two biracial children. (Should I mention that Bill de Blasio's wife, Chirlane McCray, used to be a lesbian?) This family represents the cultural changes that have enveloped parts – but not all – of America. To cultural conservatives, this doesn't look like their country at all.

Several political commentators condemned Cohen's remark. Ta-Nehisi Coates, for example, wrote:

The problem is that Richard Cohen thinks being repulsed isn't actually racist, but "conventional" or "culturally conservative." Obstructing the right of black humans and white humans to form families is a central feature of American racism. If retching at the thought of that right being exercised isn't racism, then there is no racism.

In 2019, after Linda Fairstein faced backlash for her role in the prosecution of the Central Park 5, Cohen argued that the boys were involved in the attack and that Fairstein was being slandered.

== Bibliography ==
- A Heartbeat Away: The Investigation and Resignation of Vice President Spiro T. Agnew (with Jules Witcover), New York: Viking Press, 1974, ISBN 9780670364732
- The Seduction of Joe Tynan (based on the screenplay by Alan Alda), New York: Dell Books, 1979. ISBN 9780440176107
  - Cohen was a technical advisor on the film.
- Strong at Broken Places: voices of illness, a chorus of hope, HarperCollins: New York, 2008 ISBN 9780060763114
- Israel: Is It Good for the Jews?, New York: Simon & Schuster, 2014. ISBN 9781416575689
- She Made Me Laugh: My Friend Nora Ephron, New York: Simon & Schuster, 2016, ISBN 9781476796123
