= List of manuscripts from Qumran Cave 5 =

List of the manuscripts from Qumran Cave 5
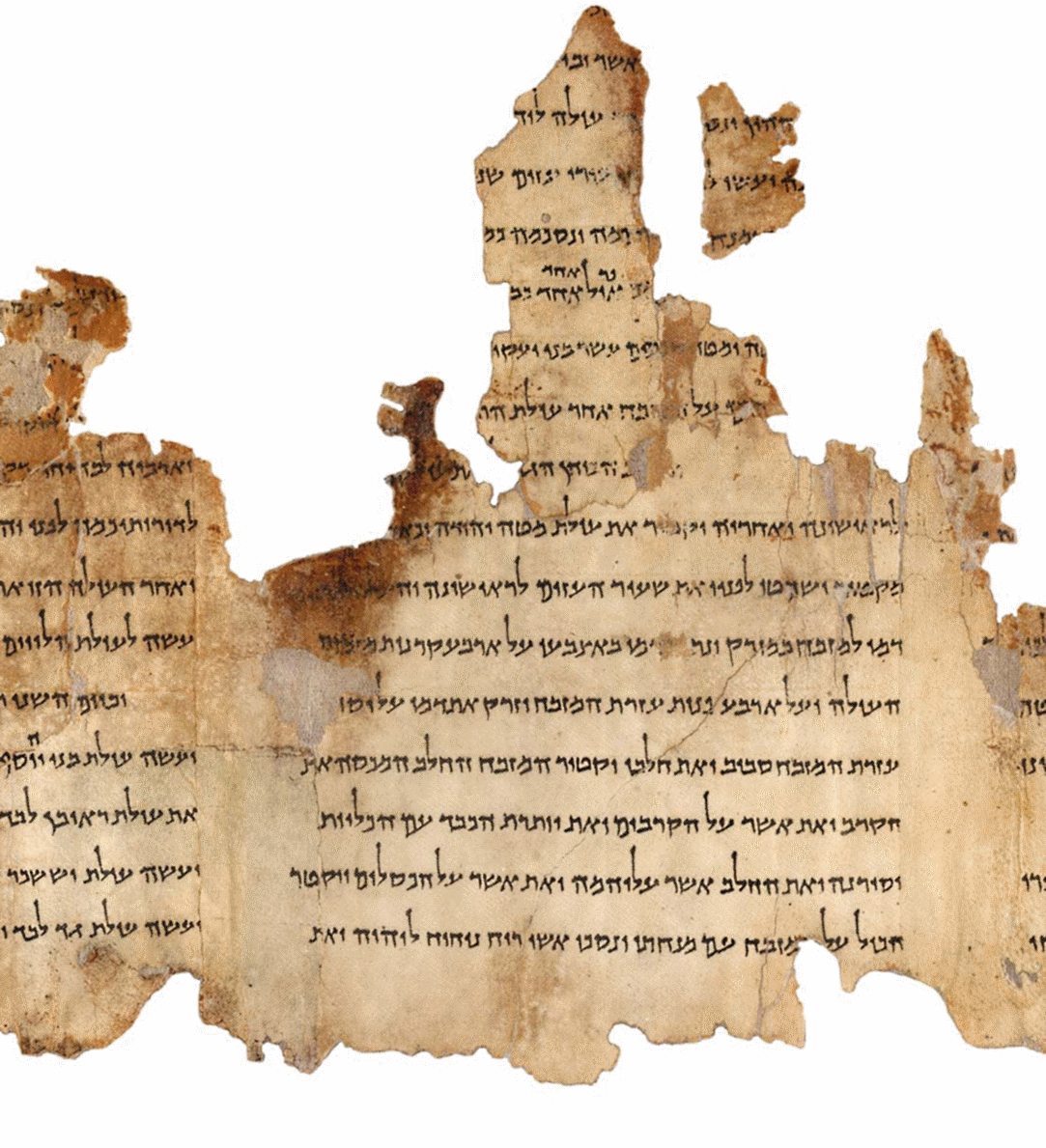
- A view of part of the Temple Scroll that was found in Qumran Cave 11.
- Material: Parchment
- Writing: Hebrew
- Created: c. 408 BCE to 318 CE
- Discovered: 1952
- Present location: Qumran

The following is a list of the Dead Sea Scrolls from the cave 5 near Qumran.

== Description ==
Wadi Qumran Cave 5 was discovered alongside Cave 6 in 1952, shortly after the discovery of Cave 4. Cave 5 produced approximately 25 manuscripts.

== List of manuscripts ==
Some resources for more complete information on the Dead Sea Scrolls are the book by Emanuel Tov, "Revised Lists of the Texts from the Judaean Desert" for a complete list of all of the Dead Sea Scroll texts, as well as the online webpages for the Shrine of the Book and the Leon Levy Collection, both of which present photographs and images of the scrolls and fragments themselves for closer study. Information is not always comprehensive, as content for many scrolls has not yet been fully published.

Fragment or scroll identifier	Fragment or scroll name	Alternative identifier	English Bible Association	Language	Date/script	Description	Reference
Qumran Cave 5
5QDeut	Deuteronomy	5Q1	Deuteronomy 7:15–24; 8:5–9:2	Hebrew	Early Hellenistic		
5QKgs	Kings	5Q2	1 Kings 1:1,16–17,27–37	Hebrew	Hasmonean		
5QIsa	Isaiah	5Q3	Isaiah 40:16,18–19	Hebrew	Herodian		
5QAmos	Amos	5Q4	Amos 1:2–5	Hebrew			
5QPs	Psalms	5Q5	Psalm 119:99–101,104,113–20,138–42	Hebrew	Herodian		
5QLam^{a}	Lamentations	5Q6	Lamentations 4:5–8,11–16,19–22; 5:1–13,16–17	Hebrew	Herodian		
5QLam^{b}	Lamentations	5Q7	Lamentations 4:17–20	Hebrew	Herodian		
5QPhyl	Phylactery	5Q8		Hebrew	Hellenistic-Roman	Phylactery in its unopened case	
5QapocrJosh or 5QToponyms	Toponyms	5Q9		Hebrew	Herodian	Seven fragments with names of places	
5QapocrMal	Apocryphon of Malachi	5Q10		Hebrew	Hellenistic-Roman	Apocryphon of Malachi	
5QS	Rule of Community (Serek ha-Yahad)	5Q11		Hebrew	Herodian		
5QD	Damascus Document	5Q12		Hebrew	Herodian	Damascus Document	
5QRule or 5QRégle	Rule of Community	5Q13		Hebrew	Hellenistic-Roman	Fragments related to 1QS	
5QCurses	Curses	5Q14		Hebrew	Herodian	Liturgical compositions with curses	
5QNJ	New Jerusalem Scroll	5Q15		Aramaic	Hellenistic-Roman	Description of the New Jerusalem	
5QUnid	Unidentified	5Q16–5Q24		Hebrew	Hellenistic-Roman	Unidentified fragments	
5QUnc	Unclassified	5Q25		Hebrew	Hellenistic-Roman	Unclassified fragments	

== See also ==
- Biblical manuscripts
- Septuagint manuscripts
- List of Hebrew Bible manuscripts

== Bibliography ==
- Fitzmyer, Joseph A. (2008). A Guide to the Dead Sea Scrolls and Related Literature. Grand Rapids, MI: William B. Eerdmans Publishing Company. ISBN 9780802862419.
