= Burkhard Gladigow =

German scholar of religion (1939–2022)

Prof. Dr. Burkhard Gladigow
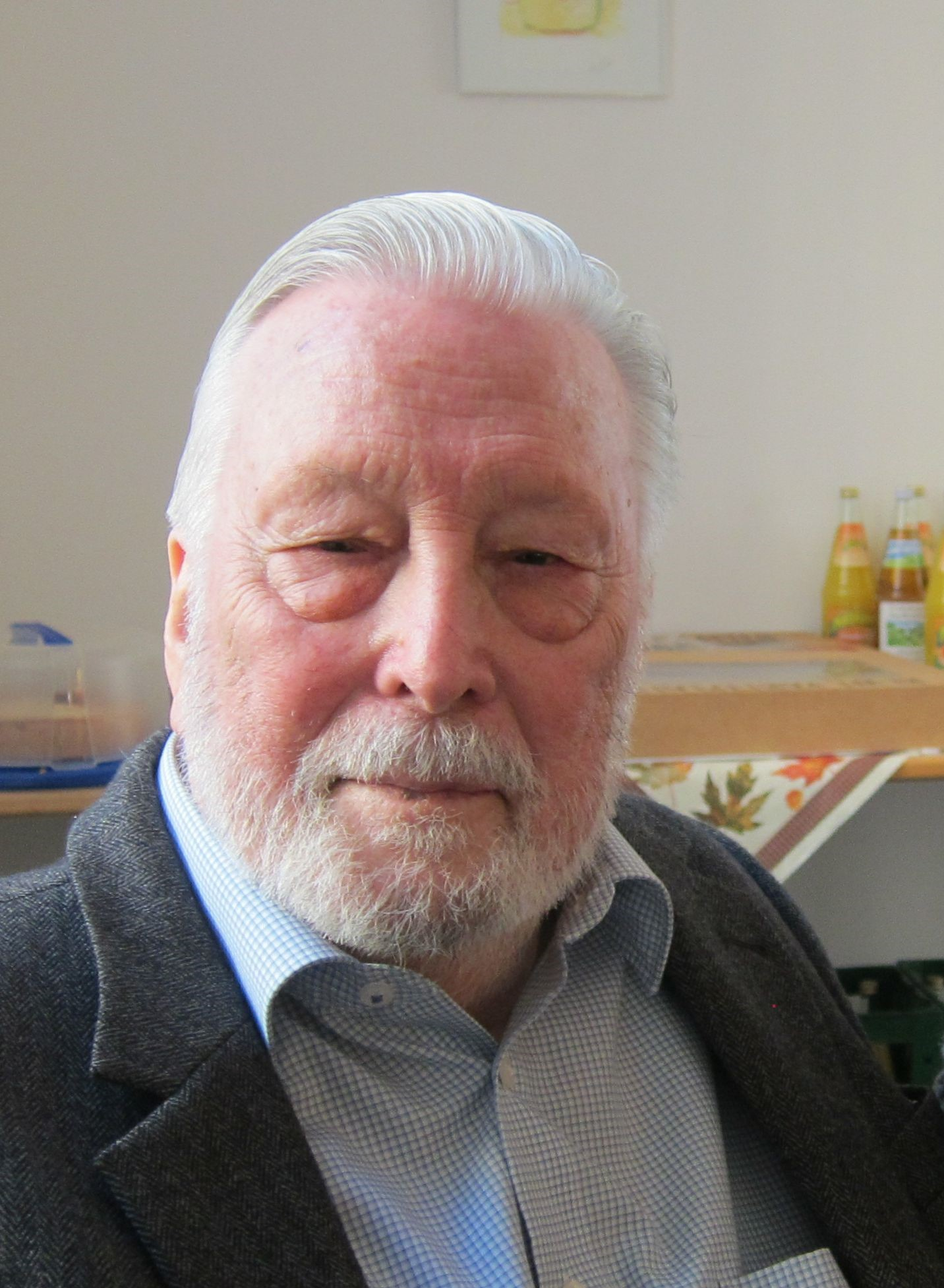
- Gladigow in 2019
- Born: 8 November 1939; Berlin
- Died: 16 December 2022 (aged 83)

Academic background
- Education: Free University of Berlin; University of Tübingen
- Thesis: Sophia und Kosmos. Untersuchungen zur Frühgeschichte von sophos und sophie (1965)

Academic work
- Discipline: Religious studies Classics
- Institutions: University of Tübingen
- Doctoral students: Christoph Auffarth; Jörg Rüpke

Burkhard Gladigow (8 November 1939 – 16 December 2022) was a German scholar of religious studies and classical philology. He was professor at the University of Tübingen.

== Biography ==
Gladigow was born in Berlin on 8 November 1939. He studied classical philology, philosophy and religious studies at the Free University of Berlin. He received his PhD from the University of Tübingen in 1962 with a dissertation on the concepts of sophos and sophia from Homer to Aeschylus. His doctoral supervisor was Hildebrecht Hommel.

He later became professor of general religious studies and classical philology at the University of Tübingen. His research focused on systematic religious studies, ancient, European and Mediterranean history of religion, the history of science, and the interference of natural science and religion. His contributions to the study of polytheism include the identification of three interdependent aspects in all major debates on the subject since the Renaissance: artistic genius as a compensation for the disenchantment of nature, the idea of polytheism as closer to nature than monotheism, and polytheism as an alternative to the claim of absolute truth.

His doctoral students at Tübingen included Christoph Auffarth and Jörg Rüpke.

In 2021, a collection of essays discussing Gladigow's contribution to the study of religion was published, under the title Religion in Culture – Culture in Religion: Burkhard Gladigow's Contribution to Shifting Paradigms in the Study of Religion. This volume contains a complete bibliography of Gladigow's work.

Gladigow died on 16 December 2022 at the age of 83.

== Selected publications ==
=== Dissertation ===
- Gladigow, Burkhard (1965). Sophia und Kosmos. Untersuchungen zur Frühgeschichte von sophos und sophie. Olms. ISBN 9780318706092.

=== Collection of articles ===
- Gladigow, Burkhard (2005). Religionswissenschaft als Kulturwissenschaft. Kohlhammer. ISBN 9783170188730.

=== Edited volumes ===
- Gladigow, Burkhard, ed. (1976). Religion und Moral. Patmos. ISBN 9783491775206.
- Gladigow, Burkhard, ed. (1981). Staat und Religion. Patmos. ISBN 9783491772311.
- Gladigow, Burkhard; Kippenberg, Hans, eds. (1983). Religionsgeschichte naturwissenschaftlicher Entwicklungen. Kösel.
- Bubner, Rüdiger; Gladigow, Burkhard; Haug, Walter, eds. (1990). Die Trennung von Natur und Geist. Fink. ISBN 9783770526444.
- Assmann, Jan; Gladigow, Burkhard, eds. (1997). Text und Kommentar. Fink. ISBN 9783770529698.
- Gladigow, Burkhard; Grözinger, Bernard; Zinser, Hartmut, eds. (1999). Religion in der schulischen Bildung und Erziehung. Berlin Verlag. ISBN 9783830500384.

=== Reference work ===
- Cancik, Hubert; Gladigow, Burkhard; Laubscher, Matthias, eds. (1983). Handbuch religionswissenschaftlicher Grundbegriffe. Kösel. ISBN 9783534274086.
