= Eileen M. Schuller =

Canadian religious scholar

Eileen Marie Schuller (born 1946) is a professor at the Faculty of Social Sciences at McMaster University in Hamilton, Ontario. Schuller is an official editor of the Dead Sea Scrolls. She teaches undergraduate and graduate studies in the Biblical field. Over a span of 30 years, her involvement in the publication of the Dead Sea Scrolls has led to numerous contributions in authenticating the discoveries found in the caves near the Ancient Qumran settlement.

== Education ==
Schuller's interest in religious studies started at an early age when she attended St. Mary's high school in Edmonton and joined the Ursuline Sisters of Chatham, Ont. whom were known for their prestigious curriculum and devotion to teaching. Her decision to become a sister was one she feels conflicted on. In an article written in honor of Schuller being appointed to the Royal Society of Canada in the division of Humanities, Lasha Morningstar from the Western Catholic Reporter quotes Schuller in response to her strong call to teach. "The heart", said Schuller "has its reasons for the heart to speak. There was a sense of call to serve the Church through teaching and study. There has always been a place in the Church that sees this as a ministry. It has developed in different ways over my life. I spent about 12 years of my life teaching in a seminary situation in Edmonton and Halifax and felt a great call to that. And I've appreciated working in the public university setting." In 1970, she attended the University of Alberta where she graduated with a Bachelor of Arts degree with honors in the Department of Classics. Three years later, she pursued a Master of Arts degree in the Department of Near Eastern Studies from the University of Toronto. In 1984, she received her Ph.D. from Harvard University in the Department of Near Eastern Languages and Civilizations.

== Career ==
After completing her undergraduate studies, she worked as a lecturer at Newman Theological College and St. Joseph's College in Edmonton from 1973 to 1977. At the Atlantic School of Theology in Halifax, she began as an assistant professor from 1982 to 1986 and then taught as an associate professor from 1986 to 1989. Lasha Morningstar notes that Archbishop Richard Smith was one of her students. After earning her Doctorate, she went on to teaching at McMaster University in 1990. For two years she taught as a tenure-track stream professor and from 1992 to 1996 she taught as a tenured, associate professor. Currently, she continues to teach as a tenured Professor (since 1996) and holds a Senator William McMaster Chair in the Department of Religious studies.

While working as an educator, she has held prestigious executive and administrative positions such as executive member-at-large, Canadian Society of Biblical Studies (1987–90), co-chair in the Qumran Section for the Society of Biblical Literature (1992–97), president of the Canadian Society of Biblical Studies (1994–95), and Board of Consultors for the Catholic Biblical Association (2011–13). In addition, Schuller has been involved in several professional organizations such as the Society of Biblical Literature, Canadian Society of Biblical Studies, Canadian Society for the Study of Religion, Catholic Biblical Association, National Association of Professors of Hebrew, and the American Schools of Oriental Research and Canadian-ASOR.

Published in 2011, a book titled Prayer and Poetry in the Dead Sea Scrolls is a collection of essays that was presented at a conference in honor of Dr. Schuller's 65th birthday. This volume reflects the state of research in the field and offers new insights into topics which Dr. Schuller has written.

== Scholarly and professional involvement ==
Over time, working on the scrolls had given Schuller a deeper appreciation of the Jewish world in which Jesus had lived. Not only did she get the chance to live in Israel, where some of the scrolls and fragments of the scrolls are kept to showcase and study, but through studying ancient Judaism, she was able to discover why there was a separation between Christians and Jews and also how they can connect and interact with one another. Since 2007, she has been a part of various Advisory Boards, namely, of the Centre for the Study of Dead Sea Scrolls in the Context of Early Judaism and Early Christianity at Copenhagen University, and the advisory board of Theologisches Wörterbuch zu den Qumrantexten and Biblischen Notizen. In addition, she was the associate editor for The HarperCollins Study Bible, a joint project of HarperCollins Press and the Society of Biblical Literature (1990-1993). She was also an associate editor for the Dead Sea Scrolls Encyclopedia, Oxford University Press (1995-2000), the New Interpreter's Dictionary of the Bible, Abingdon (2003-2009), and The Paulist Biblical Commentary at Paulist Press (2013- ). Alongside Marie-Theres Wacker, Eileen M. Schuller was co-editor for a symposium (June 2015) and a volume in the series The Bible and Women: An Encyclopedia of Exegesis and Cultural History From 1992 to present, she has been a significant member of the editorial board for Journals. Her editorials include: Journal for the Study of the Pseudepigrapha (1992-2000), Catholic Biblical Quarterly (1992-1998), Studies in Religion (1993-1995), Journal of Biblical Literature (1994-2001), Dead Sea Discoveries (1993- ), and the Catholic Biblical Quarterly (2008-2015).

=== Contributions to the community ===
In 2003, she was a consultant for the Museum of Civilizations, for the Dead Sea Scrolls Exhibit and in 2009, she consulted for the exhibition of the Dead Sea Scrolls at the Royal Ontario Museum in Toronto. She was a part of the Canadian Christian-Jewish Consultation (CCJC) and appointee of the Canadian Conference of Catholic Bishops (since 2003) and held position as Chair (2007–10). For the Alexander von Humboldt Association of Canada she was a member-at-large (2010- ) and President of Canadian Friends of the École Biblique et archéologique francaise de Jérusalem.

== Awards and recognitions ==
- 2014 – Elected member of the Royal Society of Canada
- 2013 – Senator William McMaster Chair in the Study of Religion, McMaster University
- 2013 – Lady Davis Foundation, Visiting Professorship in the Humanities, Hebrew University, Jerusalem
- 2011 – Reception of Festschrift, Prayer and Poetry in the Dead Sea Scrolls and Related Literature, ed. J. Penner, K. Penner, C. Wassen, Brill Press
- 2010 – Honorary Doctorate of Divinity, Regis College, Toronto
- 2005-06 – Alexander von Humboldt Stiftung Research Prize at Georg-August University, Göttingen, Germany
- 2005 – Honorary Doctorate of Divinity, Queen's University, Kingston, Ontario
- 1995-96 – Visiting professor, Hebrew University and the Orion Centre for the Study of the Dead Sea Scrolls and Associated Literature, Jerusalem Senior Fellow, W. F. Albright Institute of Archaeological Research, Jerusalem
- 1980-81 – George A. Barton Fellowship, W. F. Albright Institute, Jerusalem Dorot Fellowship, Jerusalem; Department of Education and Culture Scholarship, Government of Israel
- 1977-80 – Frank Knox Memorial Fellowship, Harvard University

== Selected works ==
=== Major publications ===
For Canadian scholars, a catalogue on where to access her scholarly work on the Dead Sea Scrolls would be from the Norma Marion Alloway Library at Trinity Western University

- Author of "Non-Canonical Psalms from Qumran: A Pseudopigraphic Collection, Harvard Semitic Studies 27" (Atlanta: Scholars Press, 1986).
- Author of "The Dead Sea Scrolls: What Have We Learned?" (Louisville: John Knox Press, 2006) (Reprinted Sept. 2007; translated into Arabic 2010).
- Author of "Post-exilic Prophets, The Message of Biblical Spirituality Series" (Delaware: Michael Glazier Press, 1988).
- Author of "The Dead Sea Scrolls: What Have We Learned 50 Years On?" (London: SCM Press, 2006).
- Co-Editor of "The Dead Sea Scrolls: Transmission of Traditions and Productions of Texts" Studies on the Texts of the Desert of Judah 92. (Leiden: Brill, 2010).
- Co-Editor of "The Dead Sea Scrolls at Fifty: Proceedings of the 1997 Society of Biblical Literature Qumran Section Meetings" (Atlanta: Scholars Press, 1999).
- Co-Editor of "Biblical Texts about Purity in Contemporary Christian Lectionaries" in Purity, Holiness and Identity in Judaism and Christianity: Essays in Memory of Susan Haber ed. C. Erhlich, A. Runesson, E. Schuller. Wissenschaftliche Untersuchungen zum Neuen Testament 305. 283–300. (Tübingen: Mohr Siebeck, 2013).
- Co-Editor of "Sapiential, Liturgical, and Poetical Texts from Qumran: Proceedings of the Third Meeting of the International Organization for Qumran Studies, Oslo 1998" Studies on the Texts of Desert Judah 35. (Leiden: Brill, 2000).
- The Hodayot (Thanksgiving Psalms): A Study Edition of 1QHa, with Carol A. Newsom. Early Judaism and its Literature Series 36. (Atlanta: Society of Biblical Literature, 2012).
- "1QHodayota with Incorporation of 1QHodayotb and 4QHodayota-f, Qumran Cave 1.III". Discoveries in the Judaean Desert, XL. (Oxford: Clarendon Press, 2009).
- "4Q380 and 4Q38l, Non-Canonical Psalms A and B", in Qumran Cave 4.V1: Poetical and Liturgical Texts, Part 1. Discoveries in the Judaean Desert XI. (Oxford: Clarendon Press, 1998).

=== Recent contributions and publications ===
- "Prose Prayers in Pseudo-Philo's Biblical Antiquities", in Opportunities for No Little Instruction: Festschrift for Daniel Harrington and Richard Clifford, ed. Thomas Stegeman and Christopher Frechette, Paulist Press, 2014, 135–150.
- "Introduction to the Apocrypha", for The Old Testament and Apocrypha: Fortress Commentary on the Bible, ed. G. Yee, H. Page, M. Coomber, Fortress Press, 2014, 942–952.
- "Biblical Texts about Purity in Contemporary Christian Lectionaries", in Purity, Holiness and Identity in Judaism and Christianity: Essays in Memory of Susan Haber ed. C. Erhlich, A. Runesson, E. Schuller. Wissenschaftliche Untersuchungen zum Neuen Testament 305. Tübingen: Mohr Siebeck (2013), 283–300.
- "Introduction to the Apocrypha", "First Esdras", "Tobit", in Women's Bible Commentary: Third Edition, ed. Carol Newsom, S. Ringe, J. Lapsley. Philadelphia: Westminster John Knox (2012), 365–69, 376–82.
- "Research on the Sectarian Scrolls in North America", and "Canadian Scholarship on the Dead Sea Scrolls", in The Dead Sea Scrolls in Scholarly Perspective: A History of Research, ed. Devorah Dimant, Studies on the Texts of the Desert of Judah 99. Leiden: Brill (2012), 31–48, 217–233.
- "Canadian Scholarship on the Dead Sea Scrolls", in Celebrating the Dead Sea Scrolls: A Canadian Collection, ed. P. Flint, J. Duhaime, K. Baek. Early Judaism and Its Literature 30. Atlanta/Leiden: Society of Biblical Literature/Brill (2011), 3-20.
- "Recent Scholarship on the Hodayot 1993-2010", Currents in Biblical Research 10/1 (2011), 119–162.
- Articles on "shir, shira, rinna" in Theologisches Wörterbuch zu den Qumrantexten, Vol. III, ed. H-J Fabry. Stuttgart: Kohlhammer (forthcoming); "Thank, Confess (yadah)" Vol. II, 70–78; "Woman ('issah)" Vol. I, 309–317.

Areas of interest

Her research and teachings include the following: Dead Sea Scrolls; Second Temple Judaism; women in the Bible and Early Judaism; Biblical studies, Translation of the Bible, and topics related to women in the Dead Sea Scrolls. (Dr. Schuller's lecture on passages in the Dead Sea Scrolls in relation to women).
