= Jonathan Boyarin =

American anthropologist

Jonathan Aaron Boyarin
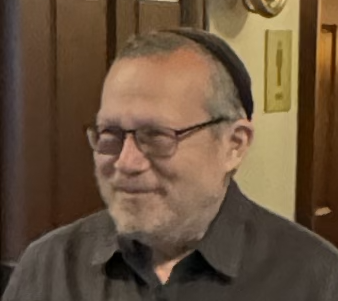
- Jonathan Boyarin, May 2024
- Born: September 16, 1956; Neptune City, New Jersey
- Occupation: Anthropologist
- Title: Thomas and Diann Mann Professor of Modern Jewish Studies, Cornell University

Academic background
- Education: Reed College (BA); New School for Social Research (MA, PhD); Yale Law School (JD)
- Thesis: Landslayt: Polish Jews in Paris (1985)
- Doctoral advisor: Stanley Diamond
- Influences: Walter Benjamin

Academic work
- Discipline: Anthropology, Jewish Studies
- Sub-discipline: Jewish ethnography, Yiddish culture, critical theory
- Institutions: Cornell University; Ecole des Hautes Etudes en Sciences Sociales; University of North Carolina-Chapel Hill; University of Kansas; Dartmouth College; The New School
- Notable ideas: "ethnography of reading"

Jonathan Aaron Boyarin (Yiddish: יונתן אהרן באָיאַרין; born September 16, 1956) is an American anthropologist whose work centers on Jewish communities and on the dynamics of Jewish culture, memory and identity. Born in Neptune, New Jersey, he is married and has two sons, Jonah and Yeshaya. In 2013, he was appointed Thomas and Diann Mann Professor of Modern Jewish Studies, Departments of Anthropology and Near Eastern Studies, Cornell University.

He is married to critical geographer Elissa Sampson.

His brother, Daniel Boyarin, is also a well-known scholar, and the two have written together.

== Career ==
Boyarin was educated at Reed College, the New School for Social Research, and the Uriel Weinreich Program in Yiddish Language, before earning his doctoral degree in anthropology at the New School for Social Research. In 1998, fourteen years after receiving his Ph.D., Boyarin received his J.D. at Yale Law School. He has taught at Cornell University, Ecole des Hautes Etudes en Sciences Sociales, University of North Carolina-Chapel Hill, University of Kansas, Dartmouth College, and The New School. He is the founding co-editor of the journal Critical Research on Religion. In 2016, Boyarin was elected a Fellow of the Academy for Jewish Research (AAJR).

== Research ==
Boyarin has investigated Jewish culture in a range of ethnographic projects set in Paris, Jerusalem, and the Lower East Side of New York City. Much of his work is in interdisciplinary critical theory, from the perspective of modern Jewish politics and experience. He has extended these interests into comparative work on diaspora, the politics of time and space, and the ethnography of reading.

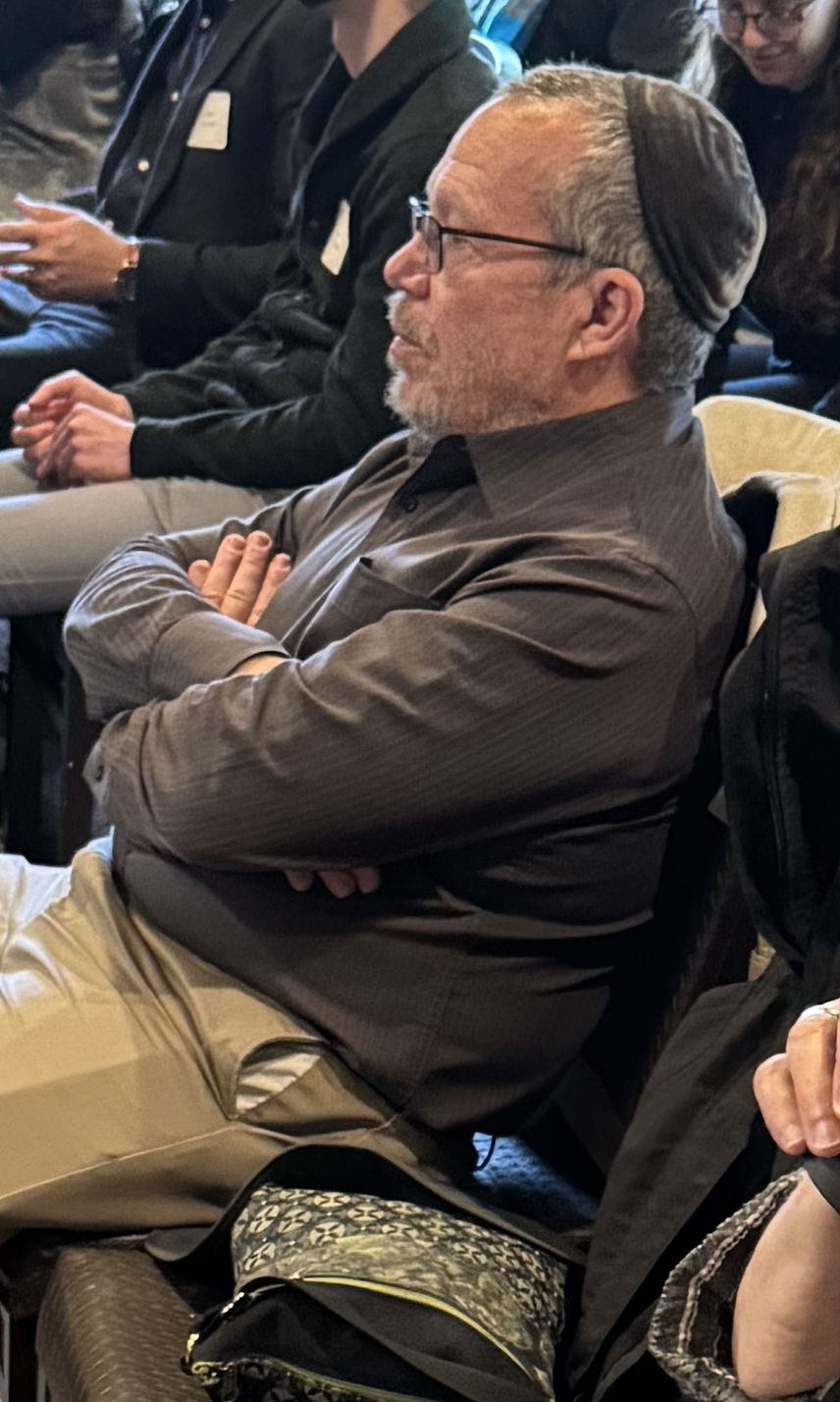
Jonathan Boyarin at the "Jews and Black Theory" conference, May 2024, Harvard Faculty Club

As a student of modern Jewish experience and culture, he has investigated comparative and theoretical questions that help illuminate the lives of Jews and others. He has conducted fieldwork in cities where those "Jews and others" live, including Paris, Jerusalem, and New York's Lower East Side. Much of his work has also been in historical ethnography, primarily of nineteenth and twentieth-century Polish Jewish life. He is also a Yiddish translator.

In 2022 and 2023, Boyarin co-led workshops on "Jews and Black Theory" at Cornell University, precursors to a May 2024 academic conference by the same name at Harvard.

=== The Ethnography of Reading ===
Boyarin edited an influential set of essays published in 1993 titled, The Ethnography of Reading, exploring how people read and talk about reading. In contrast to the older tendency to classify entire cultures as oral or literate, most of the essays explore the intermingling of silent reading, collective reading and commentary, recitations, and other text-related practices in a particular tradition or setting. Overall, the volume is concerned with how "insiders" and anthropologists talk and write about reading.

In his own essay, Boyarin describes collective reading practices in the New York City yeshiva where he studied Bible and Talmud. He relates the multivocality of the texts to the "dialogic" speech events in which students intermingle mass culture and vocabulary with sacred speech as a way of negotiating their own relationship to these highly authoritative texts. According to Brinkley M. Messick:

The volume operates at a refreshing distance from the worn controversies of oral verses literate and from scientific slants of evolution and cognition. Its basic contribution...is to "expand the archive" of our knowledge of reading and other text-reception practices. ... For Boyarin, the study of reading challenges the "lingering anti-textual bias among practitioners of cultural anthropology."

=== Influence of Walter Benjamin ===
Boyarin writes that the work of Walter Benjamin helped him to "bridge the gap" between his interests in anthropology—German traditions of critical, interdisciplinary scholarship—and the preservation and transmission of East European Jewish culture. Boyarin writes:

I learned Benjamin's "Theses on the Philosophy of History", written in 1939 as the storms of war were gathering, and never published during his lifetime. In that text, Benjamin analyzes the failure of the mid-1930s Popular Front to defeat the Nazis, and ascribes it at least in part to a philosophy of history that maintained a naïve faith in the ultimate inevitability of progress and the triumph of Reason. Instead of that philosophy of linear progress, Benjamin put forward a much more contingent notion of history and temporality, one in which at any moment a point or points from the past might be articulated with a present situation to reveal a Messianic opening "in the fight for the oppressed past."

=== Notable works ===
- The Ethnography of Reading (1993)
- Jewishness and the Human Dimension (2008)
- The Unconverted Self: Jews, Indians and the Identity of Christian Europe (2009)
- Mornings at the Stanton Street Shul: A Summer on the Lower East Side (2011)
- Jewish Families (2013)
- Time and Human Language Now (2013, co-authored with Martin Land)
- Yeshiva Days: Learning on the Lower East Side (2020)
