= 4QInstruction =

Dead Sea Scroll text

4QInstruction, (Hebrew: מוסר למבין, romanized: Musar leMevin, lit. 'Instruction to a student'), also known as Sapiential Work A or Secret of the Way Things Are, is a Hebrew text among the Dead Sea Scrolls classified as wisdom literature. It is authored by a spiritual expert, directed towards a beginner. The author addresses how to deal with business and money issues in a godly manner, public affairs, leadership, marriage, children, and family, and how to live life righteously among secular society. There is some consensus that it dates to the third century BCE.

== Manuscripts ==
4QInstruction is preserved in at least seven fragmentary manuscripts from the Dead Sea Scrolls found in Qumran caves one and four, namely: 4Q415, 4Q416, 4Q417, 4Q418, 4Q418a, 4Q423, and 1Q26. These scrolls date approximately from the first century BCE and early first century CE.

== History of scholarship ==
Cave 1 materials were first published by Józef Milik in Discoveries in the Judaean Desert 1 in 1955. Cave 4 materials were published in the Discoveries in the Judean Desert series in 1999 by John Strugnell and Daniel Harrington. The document is written in Hebrew and is likely to be categorized as "non-sectarian" or perhaps "pre-sectarian".

Among the major studies published on the document are those by Armin Lange (1995), Daniel J. Harrington (1996), Torleif Elgvin (1998), John J. Collins (1999; 2003), Eibert Tigchelaar (2001), Matthew Goff (2003), Cana Werman (2004), Benjamin Wold (2018), and Jean-Sebastian Rey (2009).

== Authorship and reception history ==
Parts of six copies were discovered, indicating popularity and importance, especially to the supposed sect at Qumran. All of the Sapiential manuscripts are in Hebrew, which is deemed the original language of the text. The actual ancient title is unknown, but the frequent use of raz nihyeh, translating to "the mystery of existence," "approaching mystery," or "the way things are" gave reason to title the work "The Secret of the Way Things are". A well-accepted theory is that the Sapiential Work was a pre-Qumranic text. In other words, it was not written for an isolated sect, but it was directed toward a specific audience. Many scholars assume the text to either have existed before the formation of the sect, or to have been a precursor to sect involvement.

=== Parallels ===
Although there is no literal dependence between Daniel and the Sapiential Works, it is likely that they emerged from the same, or similar, scribal circles. Many phrases and ideas from Daniel pertaining to wisdom, revelation, and the elect recur in "The Secret of the Way Things Are." Similarly, both books reflect scribal activity with "a quest for divine communication," and "neither are concerned with the sacrificial cult of the Temple". The Work is also analogous to New Testament scripture, with recurring similarities found in Proverbs and the Gospel of Matthew. Although the terminology is not consistently parallel, the ideas and themes are comparable.

== Contents ==
This document continues to receive so much attention because it is viewed, on the one hand, as a wisdom document and yet, on the other, has multiple apocalyptic motifs that arise alongside sapiential ones. Many major studies have asked questions about the relationship of wisdom to apocalypticism which has been part of a larger question about categorizing genres, schools and worldviews in Judaism in the Second Temple period.

One of the most discussed passages (4Q417 1 i lines 15–18) from this document is a fragmentary and cryptic description of what many view as angelic involvement in the creation of humanity, which is apparently described in reference to Genesis 1:26. Some translations find that humanity is divided into those who are among the "Spirit of Flesh" and the "Spiritual People". In addition to the fragmentary nature of these lines and the broader context, the identification of the "Vision of Hagu" and the "sons of Seth/perdition" have led to competing views about implications for the type, or even presence, of dualism that one should find in 4QInstruction.

=== Motifs ===
Although the text itself is not considered apocalyptic, and does not reflect the developed philosophical dualism of the War Scrolls or the Community Rule (1Qs), the text does reflect motifs of the end times, judgment, and a predestined division of good and evil. The overall ideas and form of the text are comparable to Proverbs, Jesus' instructions and parables in the New Testament gospels, the book of James, and especially the book of Daniel.

=== Women ===
An unusual aspect of this particular text is that it addresses women, which is very uncommon for an ancient Jewish text. 4Q413 appears to give advice to a woman, presumably the wife of the beginner being instructed. This particular section uses feminine verbal forms, rather than the singular forms used throughout the rest of the instruction.

== Editions ==
- Wise, Abegg, and Cook, The Dead Sea Scrolls: A New Translation, San Francisco: Harper, 2005.
