= Charlotte Hempel =

German biblical scholar

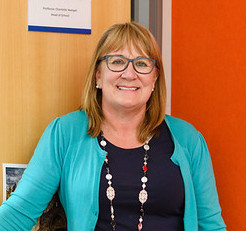
- Occupations: Professor of Hebrew Bible and Second Temple Judaism

Academic background
- Education: King's College London (PhD)

Academic work
- Discipline: Religious Studies
- Sub-discipline: Dead Sea Scrolls · Hebrew Bible · Second Temple Judaism
- Institutions: University of Birmingham
- Main interests: Damascus Document · Community Rule · 4QMMT · Hebrew Bible
- Notable works: The Qumran Rule Texts in Context: Collected Studies · T&T Clark Companion to the Dead Sea Scrolls · The Community Rules: A Commentary (Mohr Siebeck 2020)
- Website: www.birmingham.ac.uk/staff/profiles/tr/hempel-charlotte.aspx

Charlotte Hempel is a scholar of the Dead Sea Scrolls and the Hebrew Bible/Old Testament.

== Early life and education ==
Hempel was born in Germany and initially studied at the University of Mainz. After a move to the King's College London she completed first a BA (Hons) in Biblical studies (1988–1991) followed by a PhD on The Laws of the Damascus Document (1991–1994).

== Career ==
Hempel's first academic position was at the University of Birmingham as Edward Cadbury Research Fellow (1995–1997). She then held the position as Sutasoma Research Fellow at the University of Cambridge (1997–1999). For the next six years she interrupted her career after starting a family and spent most of that season in the United States, where she was for a time a Fellow at the Meyerhoff Center for Jewish Studies at the University of Maryland. In 2005 she returned to Birmingham as a Birmingham Fellow (2005–2008) then senior research fellow (2008–2010), senior lecturer (2010–2013), reader (2013–2016) and since 2016, professor of Hebrew Bible and Second Temple Judaism.

== Professional contributions and academic citizenship ==
- Reviews Editor of the Journal of Jewish Studies (2007–2011)
- Executive Editor E.J. Brill's Dead Sea Discoveries (2012–2018)
- Founding Director of Second Temple Early Career Academy (STECA) (2018–2020)
- Director of the College of Arts and Law Graduate School, University of Birmingham (2014–2017)
- Head of the School of Philosophy, Theology and Religion, University of Birmingham (2020–)
- President of The Society for Old Testament Study (2021–)

== Honours and awards ==
- British Academy Mid-Career Fellowship (2013–2014)
- President of the British Association for Jewish Studies (2016)
- AHRC Leadership Fellow (2018–2020)

== Selected works ==
- Hempel, Charlotte. The Community Rules: A Commentary. Tübingen: Mohr Siebeck, 2020.
- ———. The Qumran Rule Texts in Context: Collected Studies. Texts and Studies in Ancient Judaism 154. Tübingen: Mohr Siebeck, 2013. ISBN 9783161527098
- ———. The Laws of the Damascus Document: Sources, Traditions, and Redaction. Leiden: Brill, 1998; Pb. Atlanta: SBL, 2006. ISBN 9789004111509
- Edited with George Brooke. T&T Clark Companion to the Dead Sea Scrolls. Bloomsbury Companions. London; New York, NY: T&T Clark Bloomsbury Publishing, 2019. ISBN 9780567590220
- Edited with Ariel Feldman and Maria Cioată. Is There a Text in this Cave? Studies in the Textuality of the Dead Sea Scrolls in Honour of George J. Brooke. Studies on the Texts of the Desert of Judah 119. Leiden: Brill, 2017. ISBN 9789004344525
- Edited with A. Lange and H. Lichtenberger. The Wisdom Texts from Qumran and the Development of Sapiential Thought. Leuven: Peeters, 2002. ISBN 9789042910102
- Edited with Judith M. Lieu. Biblical Traditions in Transmission: Essays in Honour of Michael A. Knibb. Journal for the Study of Judaism Supplement Series 111. Leiden: Brill, 2006. ISBN 9789004139978
