= Dead Sea Discoveries =

Biblical Studies Journal

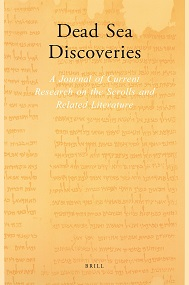
- Discipline: Biblical studies; Dead Sea Scrolls
- Language: English
- Edited by: M. Zahn

Publication details
- History: 1994–present
- Publisher: Brill

Standard abbreviations
- ISO 4: Dead Sea Discov.

Indexing
- ISSN: 0929-0761 (print); 1568-5179 (web)

Links
- Journal homepage; Online access

Dead Sea Discoveries is a peer-reviewed academic journal covering the study of the Dead Sea Scrolls. It is published by Brill Academic Publishers and the editor-in-chief is Molly M. Zahn of the University of Kansas.

== History ==
The journal was established in 1994. Previous editors include George J. Brooke, James VanderKam, Lawrence H. Schiffman, Eibert Tigchelaar (2007-2012) and Charlotte Hempel.

== Abstracting and indexing ==
The journal is included in the Scopus database and Web of Science. According to the Scimago Journal and Country Rank, the journal has a 2021 SJR-score of 0.231.
