= Azzan Yadin =

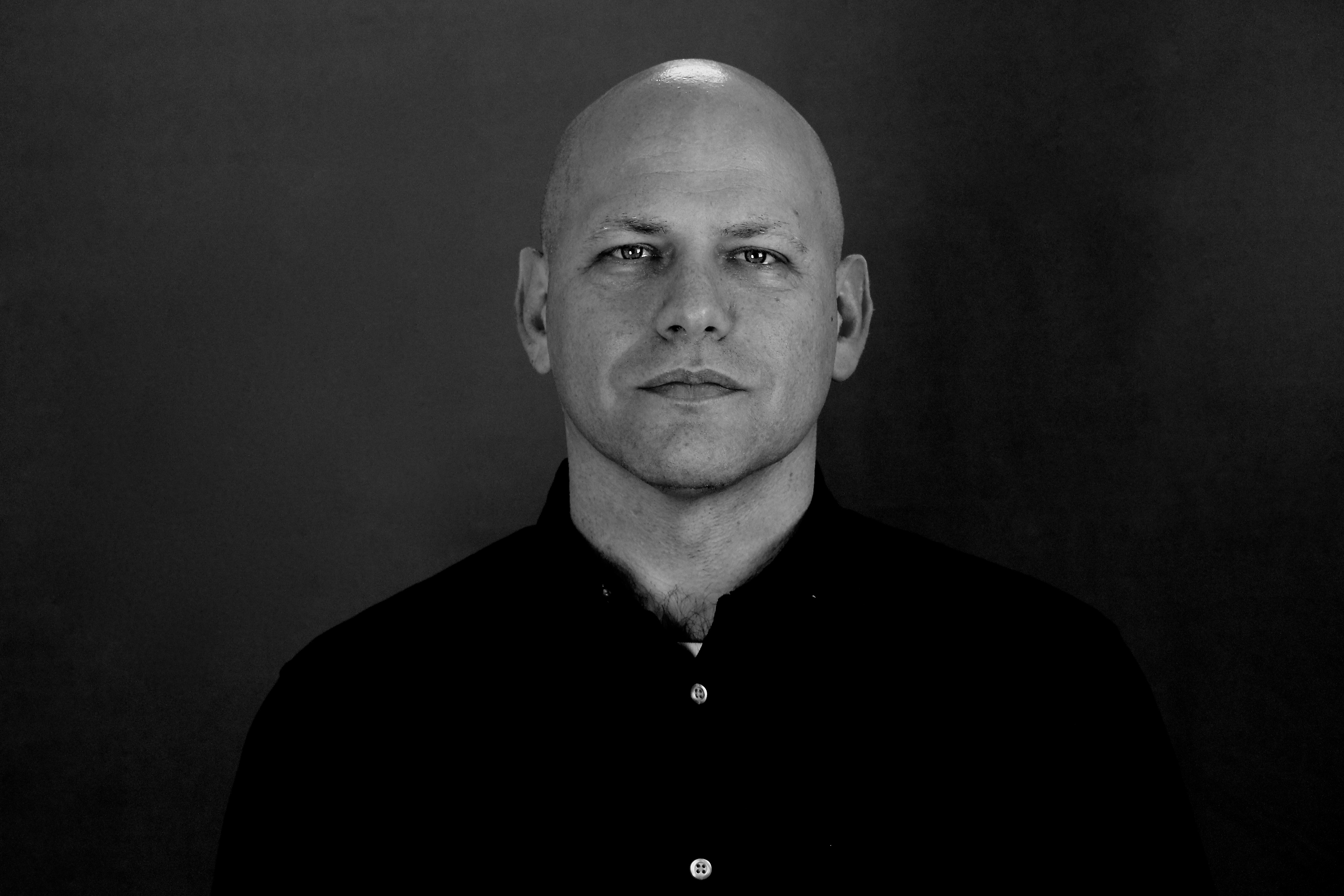

Azzan Yadin-Israel is a Professor of Jewish Studies at Rutgers University.

He holds a Bachelor of Arts degree from the Hebrew University and a Doctor of Philosophy from the University of California Berkeley and the Graduate Theological Union. His work engages with early rabbinic literature, the Dead Sea Scrolls, Jewish mysticism, and Platonic thought.

== Selected publications ==
- Yadin, Azzan (Spring 2001). "A Web of Chaos: Bialik and Nietzsche on Language, Truth, and the Death of God". Prooftexts (PDF). 21 (2): 179–203. doi:10.1353/ptx.2001.0020. ISSN 0272-9601. OCLC 362383448. S2CID 170149391.
- Yadin, Azzan (July 2002). "SAMSON'S HIDÂ". Vetus Testamentum. 52 (3): 407–426. doi:10.1163/156853302760197539. ISSN 0042-4935. OCLC 441127375.
- Yadin, Azzan (2004). Scripture as logos : Rabbi Ishmael and the origins of midrash. Divinations. Philadelphia, PA: University of Pennsylvania Press. ISBN 978-0-8122-3791-7. OCLC 611293122. LCC BM517.M43 Y33 2004.
- Yadin, Azzan (July 2004). "Goliath's Armor and Israelite Collective Memory". Vetus Testamentum. 54 (3): 373–395. doi:10.1163/1568533041694573. ISSN 0042-4935. OCLC 441127375.
- Yadin, Azzan (Spring 2006). "Rabban Gamliel, Aphrodite's Bath, and the Question of Pagan Monotheism". Jewish Quarterly Review. 96 (2): 149–179. doi:10.1353/jqr.2006.0015. ISSN 0021-6682. OCLC 359856300. S2CID 170868963.
- Yadin, Azzan (Fall 2010). "Rabbi Akiva's Youth". Jewish Quarterly Review. 100 (4): 573–597. ISSN 0021-6682. OCLC 692686669.
- Yadin-Israel, Azzan (2015). Scripture and Tradition: Rabbi Akiva and the Triumph of Midrash. Philadelphia, PA: University of Pennsylvania Press.

Yadin is also the translator of a two-volume collection of essays by Israeli scholar David Flusser entitled Judaism of the Second Temple Period (Grand Rapids: Eerdmans, 2007, 2009).
