= Christoph Auffarth =

German religious scholar and theologian

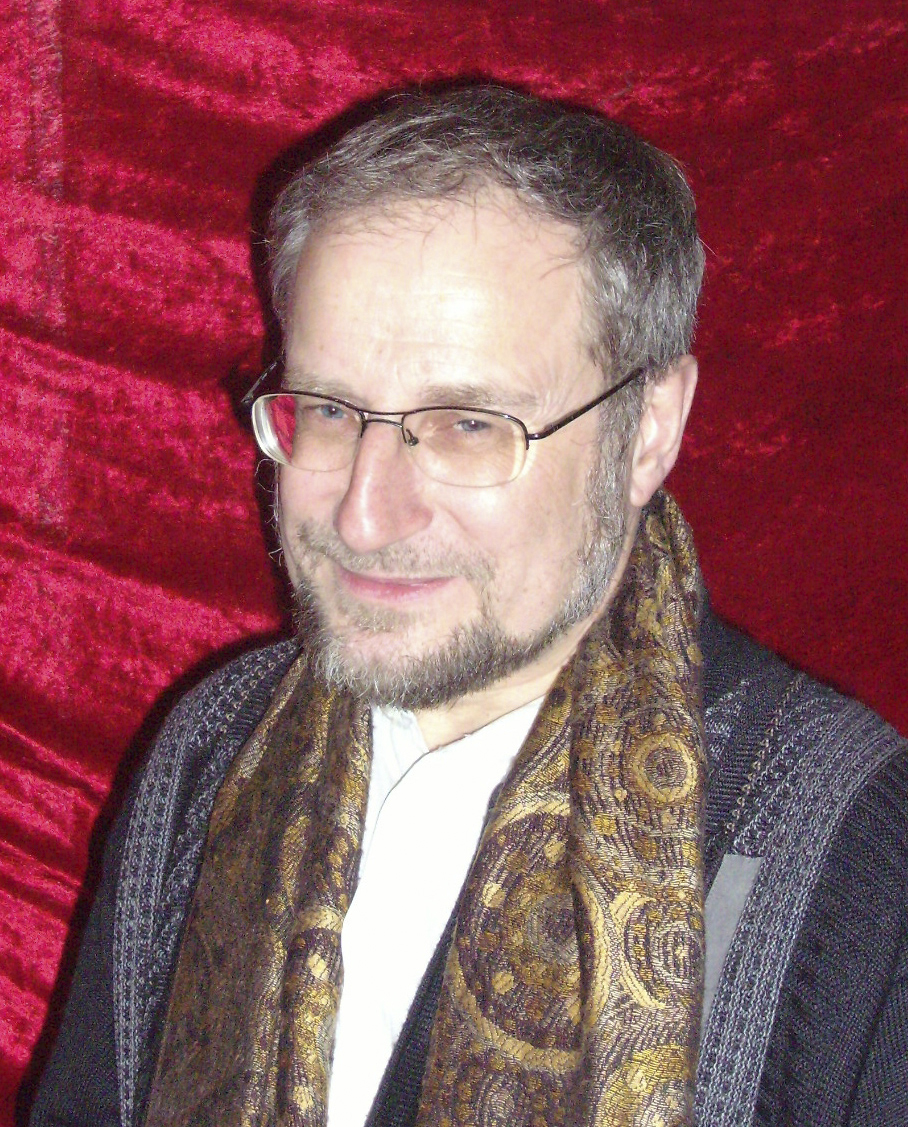
- Auffarth in 2009
- Born: 14 December 1951 (age 74); Mannheim, Germany
- Occupations: Scholar and theologian
- Years active: Professor at the Institute of Religious Studies / Education

Christoph Auffarth (born 14 December 1951 in Mannheim) is a German religious scholar and theologian. Auffarth is a professor at the Institute of Religious Studies / Education at the University of Bremen with a focus on history and theologies of Christianity.

== Biography ==
Auffarth spent his childhood and youth in his hometown of Mannheim, where he graduated in 1970 at the classical and musical Johann Sebastian Bach High School. He then moved to the neighbouring town of the Rhine-Neckar metropolitan region and began studying the subjects of history, Greek, Latin and archaeology at the University of Heidelberg in the winter semester 1970/71. After spending some time in Athens, Greece in 1974 (Byzantine Studies, Archeology, Greek), he moved to the University of Tübingen, where he continued his studies in history, Greek and Latin. In addition, he took the subjects of religious studies and theology. One day after his 24th birthday Auffarth received his first degree in 1975, the first state exam for teaching at grammar schools . His traineeship in the subjects Latin, Greek and history graduated from Auffarth Uhland Gymnasium Tübingen, 1977 followed the Second State Examination for teaching at grammar schools.

After Auffarth worked in the following years as a study assistant at the Wildermuth Gymnasium in Tübingen, he completed there a postgraduate studies in religious studies, Greek studies and theology, which in 1987 had a doctorate in religious studies to the result. The doctoral thesis was published in 1991 under the title The imminent demise. "Creation" published in myth and ritual in the ancient Orient and in Greece using the example of the Odyssey and Ezekiel book.

From 1987 Auffarth held teaching assignments for comparative religious studies at the University of Tübingen. From 1994 to 1996 he was assistant at the Department of Indology and Religious Studies at the University of Tübingen. 1995 followed the habilitation in the field of religious studies and Greek philology. Auffarth then did his doctorate again: in 1996, the Rijksuniversiteit Groningen awarded him the doctorate in theology.

Since 2001, Auffarth has been Full Professor of Religious Studies with a focus on History and Theologies of Christianity at the University of Bremen.

In 2010 Auffarth was selected as a fellow for a one-year research visit to the International Center for Humanities Research ( Käte-Hamburger-Kolleg ) at the Ruhr-University Bochum within the overall project Dynamics of religious history between Asia and Europe.

== Career ==
Numerous articles in specialist encyclopaedias such as the RGG (4th edition) and anthologies point to Auffarth as a distinguished scholar (see below). The encyclopaedia Metzler Encyclopedia Religion: Everyday Life, Media, Present is one of the standard works in the field of religious studies. The International Review for Biblical Studies characterized the lexicon: "The volume is characterized by the cultural-historical orientation of the Tübingen School of Religious Studies and the publisher Auffarth and thus represents an addition to the handbook of fundamental religious concepts. The entire work deserves emphatic recommendation." The Neue Zürcher Zeitung wrote: "The use of this lexicon itself is already not only an intellectual, but also sensual pleasure." In the Frankfurter Allgemeine Zeitung the reviewer Wolfram Kinzig praised Auffarth's book The heretics: Cathars, Waldenses and other religious movements and described the author as a "connoisseur of the topic in the Middle Ages". His book Earthly ways and heavenly reward was also discussed positively. Peter J. Bräunlein wrote in the Bavarian Yearbook for Folklore: "The material and imaginative research presented here can be read with great profit. At the same time, each page presents the power of a religious science that sees itself as cultural science. "

== Works ==
=== Thesis ===
- Auffarth, Christoph (1986). Der drohende Untergang: "Schöpfung" in Mythos und Ritual im alten Orient und in Griechenland am Beispiel der Odyssee und des Ezechielbuches (in trans. The Imminent Downfall. "Creation" in myth and ritual in the Ancient Near East and in Greece using the example of the Odyssey and Ezekiel (Ph.D.). University of Tübingen.

=== Books ===
- ——— (1991). Der drohende Untergang: "Schöpfung" in Mythos und Ritual im alten Orient und in Griechenland am Beispiel der Odyssee und des Ezechielbuches (in trans. The imminent downfall. "Creation" in myth and ritual in the Ancient Near East and in Greece using the example of the Odyssey and Ezekiel). Religious-Historical Experiments and Preliminary Works. Vol. 39. Berlin: De Gruyter. ISBN 3-11-012640-0. - published version of his 1986 University of Tübingen dissertation.
- ——— (2002). Irdische Wege und himmlischer Lohn: Kreuzzug, Jerusalem und Fegefeuer in religionswissenschaftlicher Perspektive (in trans Earthly ways and heavenly reward. Crusade, Jerusalem and purgatory in religious perspective). Veröffentlichungen des Max-Planck-Instituts für Geschichte. Vol. 144. Göttingen: Vandenhoeck & Ruprecht. ISBN 9783525354599. OCLC 49391227.
- ——— (2005). Die Ketzer: Katharer, Waldenser und andere religiöse Bewegungen (in trans. The Heretics: Cathars, Waldenses and other religious movements. Beck'sche Reihe, C.-H.-Beck-Wissen. Vol. 2383. Munich: CH Beck. ISBN 9783406508837. OCLC 2544916417.

=== Articles and Editorships ===
- ———; Bernard, Jutta; Mohr, Hubert, eds. (1999–2002). Metzler Lexikon Religion: Gegenwart, Alltag, Medien - 4 volumes. Stuttgart: Metzler. ISBN 9783476015518. OCLC 42268495. - (English, revised edition as The Brill Dictionary of Religion, Brill, Leiden, Boston 2006, ISBN 9004124322 ).
- ———; Stuckenbruck, Loren T., eds. (2004). The Fall of the Angels. Themes in Biblical Narrative. Vol. 6. Leiden: Brill. ISBN 9781429409933. OCLC 191936537.
- ———; Kippenberg, Hans G.; Michaels, Axel, eds. (2006). Wörterbuch der Religionen (in trans. Dictionary of Religions. Kröners Taschenausgabe. Vol. 125. Stuttgart: Kröner. ISBN 9783520140012. OCLC 255305688.
- with Ulrich Berner (ed.): Religious Pluralism in the Middle Ages? Visit an epoch of European religious history. Proceedings (= Religions in the Plural World, vol. 1). Lit, Berlin u. a. 2007, ISBN 978-3-8258-8631-8 .
- with Sonja Kerth (ed.): Faith dispute and laughter. Reformation and laughter culture in the Middle Ages and the early modern Period (= religions in the plural world, Vol. Lit, Berlin / Münster 2008, ISBN 978-3-8258-1212-6 .
- Ancient Jews and Christians quarrel within earshot: Daniel Boyarin's Borderlines in German. In: www.rpi-virtuell.net (PDF; 224 kB) (Review 2010 on Daniel Boyarin: Border Lines: The Partition of Judaeo-Christianity (= Divinations: Rereading late ancient religion ) Vol 3) University of Pennsylvania Press, Philadelphia 2004, ISBN 0-8122-3764-1, see the [later] German translation: Daniel Boyarin: demarcations The division of Judaeo-Christianity from the English by Gesine Palmer (= Work on New Testament theology and contemporary history 1) Institute for Church and Judaism, Center for Christian-Jewish Studies / Lehrhaus eV, Berlin / Dortmund 2009, ISBN 978-3-923095-70-4 ).
- Births and siblings. In: www.rpi-virtuell.net (PDF, 100 kB) (Review 2010 to: Peter Schäfer : The birth of Judaism from Christianity Five lectures on the emergence of rabbinic Judaism (= Tria Corda, Vol 6) Mohr Siebeck, Tübingen 2010, ISBN 978-3-16-150256-9 ).

== Bibliography ==
- Hebel, Philipp-Michael (2011). Comparative analysis of the emergence theories of heresy in the Christian religion in the late Middle Ages by Christoph Auffarth and Daniel Boyarin. Berlin: GRIN Verlag GmbH. ISBN 978-3-640-92363-2.
