= Benjamin Wold =

Benjamin Wold is currently Professor of Ancient Judaism and Christianity at Trinity College, Dublin, School of Religion (Faculty of Arts, Humanities, and Social Sciences).

== Publications ==
- Women, Men and Angels: Allusions to Genesis Creation Traditions in Musar leMevin (Tübingen: Mohr Siebeck, 2005). See 4QInstruction
- 4QInstruction: Divisions and Hierarchies (STDJ 123; Leiden: Brill, 2018)
- (ed.) Memory and Remembrance in the Bible and Antiquity (Tübingen: Mohr Siebeck, 2007), with Loren Stuckenbruck and Stephen Barton.
- (ed.) Das Böse, der Teufel und Dämonen - Evil, the Devil and Demons (Tübingen: Mohr Siebeck, 2015), with Jan Dochhorn and Susanne Rudnig-Zelt.
