= Steven I. Weiss =

American journalist

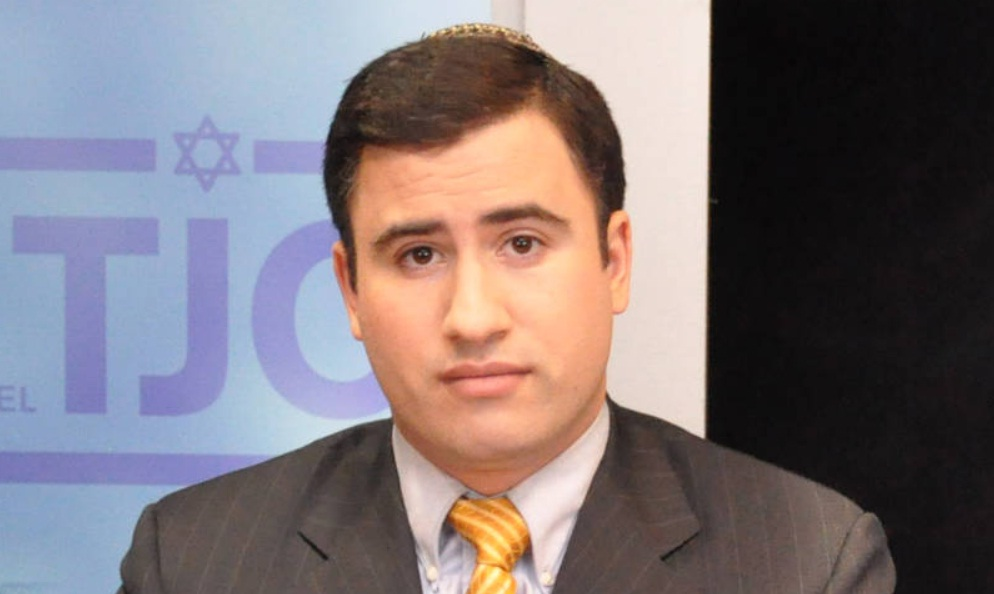
- Steven I. Weiss
- Born: Steven Ira Weiss; Cleveland, OH
- Occupations: Television journalist Anchor; Blogger
- Years active: 2001–Present
- Spouse: Rachel Feinerman
- Children: 2

Steven Ira Weiss is an American journalist who has worked in television, blogging and print. He has written for The Washington Post, The Daily Beast, Slate, New York Magazine, Harper's and many other publications.

== Career ==
Weiss first made a name for himself while a student journalist at Yeshiva University. Michael Wolff, in a column for New York Magazine, cited Weiss's commentary on New York Times writer Thomas Friedman. During the 2001 New York City mayoral election, Weiss broke the story of candidate Michael Bloomberg's donations to the Democratic club run by the brother of the only Democratic elected official to endorse him in that race.

Weiss's work as a student led to a position in Wayne Barrett's office at The Village Voice, where he reported on issues ranging from organized crime associates' contracts with municipal unions, to New York elected officials' stances on the Iraq War.

Weiss began blogging in 2002, first on an individual blog and then founding a group blog, the now defunct Protocols, a Jewish blogging site, where he coined the term "J-Blogosphere". Weiss's work at Protocols generated a reputation in the Jewish ethnic media, and he began reporting regularly for The Forward, winning an American Jewish Press Association for his work on a report about a racist book published in the ultra-Orthodox community.

Weiss went on to launch one of the first hyperlocal, blog-based daily-news websites in 2004, CampusJ, which eventually grew to more than 50 reporters. Jewish journalists at colleges around the country. The mission of CampusJ was to "train a young generation of Jewish journalists in the reporting styles and methods of new media, while giving them the training and opportunities to enter the journalism workforce better-equipped than many of their fellow-classmen." CampusJ successes included a deal for reprinting rights with Jewish news wire service JTA, and forcing The New York Times to admit an ethical lapse in its reporting on an agreement a New York Times reporter made with the administration of Columbia University to not quote students' views in an article.

Since 2006, Weiss has been director of original programming & new media at The Jewish Channel, a national cable channel called "a Jewish HBO" by The New York Times, for which he serves as news anchor, executive producer, editor of its wire service and leader of various digital media efforts.

== Investigative reporting ==
Weiss's broadcast television work has made international headlines on multiple occasions. His interview with then-2012 GOP Presidential Primary front-runner Newt Gingrich, in which the latter called the Palestinians an "invented" people, was excerpted on well more than 500 U.S. newscasts, including CNN and Fox News. His 2011 report on an Israeli government ad campaign warning expatriates against marrying Americans generated so much outrage among U.S. groups that the prime minister personally ordered the ads taken down.

Weiss is particularly known for his digital journalism innovations. New York Times best-selling author Jeffrey Sharlet wrote of him, "If you crossed Jorge Luis Borges and Isaac Babel, and forced the monstrosity that resulted to write on deadline, you might wind up with something like the journalism of Steven I. Weiss — erudite and two-fisted, obsessive-compulsive brilliance expressed in broad strokes. Weiss is a case study in how the internet can foster nonfiction writing that’s deeper, smarter, and more entertaining than that manufactured through the chain of command at the dailies." New media figure Jeff Jarvis wrote that Weiss is "One of the most energetic, talented, dedicated people I've met in this world." Ben Smith declared Weiss's investigation into the New York State Department of Health "a quite damning indictment."

Tim Noah at Slate noted Weiss's investigation into the Nixon administration's firing of employees at the Bureau of Labor Statistics, an episode Noah referred to as "the last official act of anti-Semitism in U.S. history."

Weiss's report on an Israeli government ad campaign warning expatriates against marrying Americans generated coverage by a great many prominent writers and publications, starting especially with The Atlantic's Jeffrey Goldberg, and generating mentions in The New York Times and The Washington Post. Response from usually-staid U.S. Jewish groups was of great anger, including a statement from the Jewish Federations of North America that the ads were "outrageous and insulting." Israeli Prime Minister Benjamin Netanyahu responded by ordering the ads taken down.

== Awards ==
Weiss has received a number of awards, including:

- The 2014 Boris Smolar Award for Excellence in Investigative Journalism for his coverage of Rabbi Michael Broyde
- The 2015 Excellence in Financial Journalism Award for his coverage of the Yeshiva University investigation

== Personal life ==
Weiss is married with two children and is a member of the Orthodox Jewish community.
