= Alvin Hirsch Rosenfeld =

American scholar of religion (born 1938)

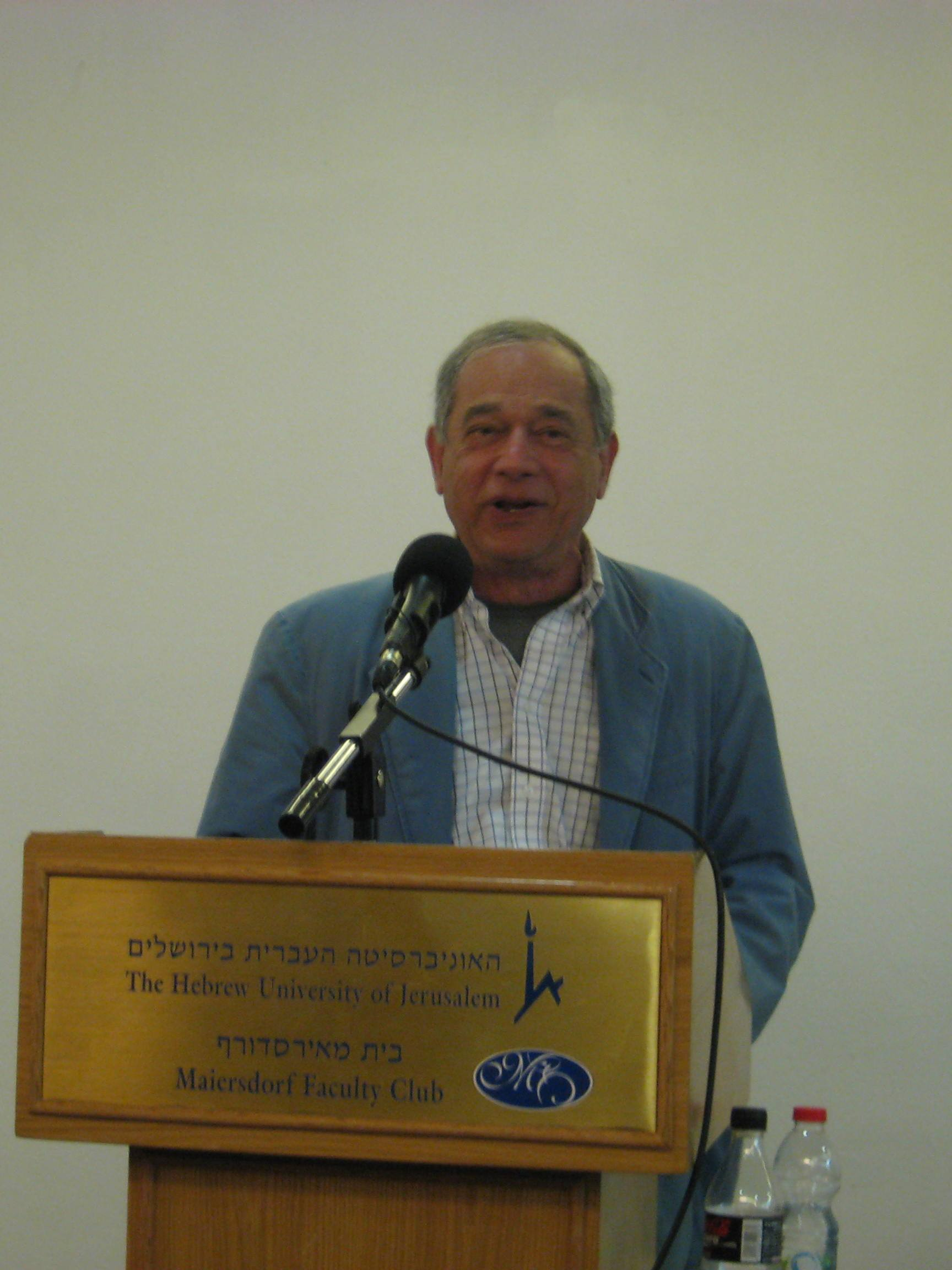
Alvin Hirsch Rosenfeld

Alvin Hirsch Rosenfeld (born 1938) is an American professor and scholar who has written about the Holocaust, and the new antisemitism. He holds the Irving M. Glazer Chair in Jewish Studies at Indiana University, and is the Director of the Institute for the Study of Contemporary Antisemitism.

Rosenfeld was born in Philadelphia and has earned his PhD from Brown University in 1967.

== Books ==
- A Double Dying: Reflections on Holocaust Literature, (Indiana University Press, 1980; paperback ed., 1988; German, Polish, and Hungarian editions). ISBN 0253133378.
- Imagining Hitler (Indiana University Press, 1985; Japanese-language translation). ISBN 0253139600.
- The End of the Holocaust, (Indiana University Press, 2011; German, Hebrew, Hungarian, and Polish translations). ISBN 0253000920.
- Deciphering the New Antisemitism (Indiana University Press; 2015). ISBN 0253018692.
- Anti-Zionism and Antisemitism: The Dynamics of Delegitimization (Indiana University Press; 2019).

== Notable articles ==
- Hayes, Peter, ed. (1991). "Popularization and Memory: The Case of Anne Frank". Lessons and Legacies I: The Meaning of the Holocaust in a Changing World. Evanston, IL: Northwestern University Press. pp. 243–278. ISBN 0810109565.
- Progressive Jewish Thought and the New Anti-Semitism. American Jewish Committee. 2006
