= Trinity Western University Dead Sea Scrolls Institute =

Founded in 1995, the Trinity Western University Dead Sea Scrolls Institute is the only centre in North America dedicated to the manuscript discoveries in the Judean Desert and material finds of the Qumran community. With strengths in the textual and philological interpretations of both biblical and non-biblical texts, the institute provides support and resources graduate and faculty research, events, and publications on the Qumran finds.

== Founders and directors ==
The Trinity Western University Dead Sea Scrolls institute was founded by Craig Evans in 1995. From 1995 to 2015, the institute was co-directed by Martin Abegg and Peter Flint. Following Abegg's retirement in 2015, Andrew Perrin stepped into the role of co-director alongside Flint. The institute has been home of the Ben Zion Wacholder Chair and Canada Research Chair in Dead Sea Scrolls Studies.

== Events and initiatives ==
The institute has a heritage of hosting public and academic events related to the Dead Sea Scrolls and will launch an open-access initiative for research and reviews on the Qumran finds, entitled Maskilim. Open access resources in the form of public lectures and introductory course content for the Dead Sea Scrolls are also archived on the Institute's YouTube channel. Launched by alumni in 2015, the Dead Sea Scrolls Legacy Scholarship supports graduate students who are entering into the Masters of Arts in Biblical Studies program and display a strong interest in researching topics surrounding the Dead Sea Scrolls.
