= Henoch (journal) =

- Discipline: Second Temple Judaism, Christianity and Judaism in Late Antiquity
- Language: English, French, German, Hebrew, Italian, Spanish
- Edited by: Piero Capelli

Publication details
- History: 1979-present
- Publisher: Morcelliana
- Frequency: Biannual

Standard abbreviations
- ISO 4: Henoch

Indexing
- ISSN: 0393-6805
- LCCN: 82647159
- OCLC no.: 6547176

Links
- Journal homepage; Online archive

Henoch: Historical and Textual Studies in Ancient and Medieval Judaism and Christianity is an academic journal established in 1979 by Paolo Sacchi (University of Turin) that publishes on the history of Judaism broadly conceived, inclusive of the Second Temple, rabbinic and medieval periods, Christian origins and Jewish-Christian relations until the Early Modern Age. The editor-in-chief is Piero Capelli (Ca' Foscari University of Venice). The journal is published by Morcelliana (Brescia, Italy).

== Name ==
The ancient patriarch Enoch is the hero and patron because Enoch is an inter-canonical, interdisciplinary character par excellence and as such requires an inter-canonical, interdisciplinary approach by specialists of both Judaic and Christian Studies. Enoch is the symbol of the determination to go beyond the traditional boundaries that divide the field of research of ancient and medieval Judaism and Christianity.

== Organization ==
The journal is jointly edited by an international board of directors, assisted by an editorial board and by an international advisory board. It is double-blind peer-reviewed and indexed in the main international academic databases for the Humanities, Religious Studies, and Social Sciences.

== History ==
The journal was established in 1979 by Paolo Sacchi (University of Turin). The interests of the journal ranged from the Bible to contemporary Judaic studies, already with a clear emphasis on ancient Judaism, including Christian origins. From 1979 to 1986 the journal was published by Marietti (Casale Monferrato, then Genoa, Italy). In 1987 the journal moved to another publisher, Silvio Zamorani editore (Turin, Italy). From 1989 to 1995 Bruno Chiesa (University of Pavia, then University of Turin) was the editor-in-chief; he was succeeded by Claudio Gianotto (University of Turin) from 1996 to 2004. In 2005 the journal moved to a new publisher, Morcelliana (Brescia, Italy), starting its 2nd series with the new subtitle "Studies in Judaism and Christianity from Second Temple to Late Antiquity" and shifting its focus from the broader field of Judaic Studies to the period following the Babylonian exile up to the rise of Islam. Gabriele Boccaccini (University of Michigan) was appointed as the new editor-in-chief. In 2012 the journal started its 3rd series with the subtitle "Historical and Textual Studies in Ancient and Medieval Judaism and Christianity", publishing on the history of Judaism broadly conceived, inclusive of the Second Temple, rabbinic and medieval periods, Christian origins and Jewish-Christian relations until the Early Modern Age, with priority given to studies that advance the discipline of textual criticism. The new editor-in-chief was Corrado Martone (University of Turin). In 2017 he was succeeded by Piero Capelli (Ca' Foscari University of Venice).
