= Textual variants in the Book of Leviticus =

Differences in Book of Leviticus manuscripts

There are textual variants in the Hebrew Bible found in the Book of Leviticus.

== Legend ==
Purported inter-relationship between significant ancient Old Testament manuscripts (some identified by their siglum).

Frequently used sigla (symbols and abbreviations) of Hebrew Bible manuscripts and editions include:

א: Codex Sinaiticus
A: Codex Alexandrinus
B: Codex Vaticanus (Roman Septuagint)
C: Codex Ephraemi Rescriptus
ABP: Apostolic Bible Polyglot
AC: Aleppo Codex
BHS: Biblia Hebraica Stuttgartensia
Brenton: Brenton's Septuagint Translation 1879
LC: Leningrad Codex
LXX: Septuagint (list)
LXX^{Rahlfs}: Rahlfs' Septuagint 1935
LXX^{Swete}: Swete's Septuagint 1930
K: ketiv
Kennicott^{x}: Kennicott's Vetus Test. Hebraicum
MAM: Miqra according to the Masorah
m.: Mishna
MT or 𝕸: Masoretic Text
MT^{Ginsburg}: C.D. Ginsburg's Masoretic Text
OL or: Old Latin / Vetus Latina (list)
Q: qere
xQx: Dead Sea Scrolls (list)
S: Peshitta
SP: Samaritan Pentateuch
Tg: Targum
Tg^{Be}: Targum Berlin Orientalis 1213
Tg^{J}: Targum Jonathan
Tg^{O}: Targum Onqelos
Tg^{N}: Targum Neofiti
Tg^{PJ}: Targum Pseudo-Jonathan
Vg: Vulgate (list)
Vg^{Clement}: Clementine Vulgate 1592
Vg^{Colunga&Turrado}: A. Colunga & L. Turrado's Vulgata 1946
Vg^{neo}: Nova Vulgata 1979
WLC: Westminster Leningrad Codex

== List ==
This list provides examples of known textual variants, and contains the following parameters: Hebrew texts written right to left, the Hebrew text romanised left to right, an approximate English translation, and which Hebrew manuscripts or critical editions of the Hebrew Bible this textual variant can be found in. Greek (Septuagint) and Latin (Vulgate) texts are written left to right, and not romanised. Sometimes additional translation or interpretation notes are added, with references to similar verses elsewhere, or in-depth articles on the topic in question.

=== Leviticus 18 ===
Leviticus 18 in Brenton's Septuagint translation (1879)

Leviticus 18:4

תִּשְׁמְר֖וּ לָלֶ֣כֶת, tiš-mə-rū lā-le-ḵeṯ, '[you] shall keep to walk' – WLC
φυλάξεσθε πορεύεσθαι, '[you] shall keep [you] shall walk' – LXX^{Swete} LXX^{Rahlfs}
φυλάξεσθε, καὶ πορεύεσθαι, '[you] shall keep, and [you] shall walk' – Brenton ABP
et ambula[biti]s, 'and [you] shall walk' – OL^{L} OL^{W}
servabitis, et ambulabitis, '[you] shall serve, and [you] shall walk' – Vg^{Colunga&Turrado}.

The verb servāre is the root of the word service; the verb ambulāre is the root of the word ambulance.

Leviticus 18:5

אֲשֶׁ֨ר יַעֲשֶׂ֥ה אֹתָ֛ם הָאָדָ֖ם וָחַ֣י בָּהֶ֑ם, ’ă-šer ya-‘ă-śeh ’ō-ṯām hā-’ā-ḏām wā-ḥay bā-hem, '(because) if a man does [them,] (then/and/that) he shall live by them.' – WLC
אֲשֶׁ֨ר יַעֲשֶׂ֥ה אֹתָ֛ם הָאָדָ֖ם וחיה בָּהֶ֑ם, ’ă-šer ya-‘ă-śeh ’ō-ṯām hā-’ā-ḏām wā-ḥā-yāh bā-hem, '(because) if a man does [them,] (then/and/that) she shall live by them.' – SP

Compare Exodus 1:16 (last verb). It is unclear whether the verb(s) used for "to live" is/are H2421 חָיָה chayah or H2421 חָיַי chayay.

ἃ ποιήσας ἄνθρωπος ζήσεται ἐν αὐτοῖς·, 'by which [a] man doing shall live by them;' – LXX^{Swete} LXX^{Rahlfs}
ἃ ποιήσας αυτά άνθρωπος ζήσεται ἐν αὐτοῖς·, 'by which [a] man doing them shall live by them;' – Brenton ABP
qui ea fecerit, 'who shall have done them' – OL^{W}
quae faciet homo, uiuet in eis:, 'which [a] man shall do, shall live by them.' – OL^{L}
quae faciens homo, vivet in eis., 'which [a] man doing, shall live by them.' – Vg^{Colunga&Turrado}

Leviticus 18:5

אֲנִ֖י יְהוָֽה׃ ס, ’ă-nî Yah-weh. s, 'I [am] Yahweh.' – WLC
ἐγὼ κύριος ὁ θεὸς ὑμῶν., 'I [am] (the) lord your god.' – LXX^{Swete} LXX^{Rahlfs} ABP
ἐγὼ Κύριος., 'I [am] (the) Lord.' – Brenton
Ego Dominus., 'I [am] (the) Lord.' – Vg^{Colunga&Turrado}

Leviticus 18:7

matris suae, 'of his/her mother:' – OL^{L} OL^{W}
matris tuae, 'of your mother:' – Vg^{Colunga&Turrado}

Leviticus 18:7

אִמְּךָ֣ הִ֔וא, ’im-mə-ḵā hî, 'he [is] your mother' – MT WLC
אִמְּךָ֣ היא, ’im-mə-ḵā hi, 'she [is] your mother' – SP
μήτηρ γάρ σού ἐστιν(,), 'for/because she is your mother(,)' – LXX^{Swete} LXX^{Rahlfs} Brenton ABP
confusione enim., 'truly in confusion.' – OL^{L}
mater tua est:, 'your mother is: or [she] is your mother:' – Vg^{Colunga&Turrado}

Leviticus 18:7

καὶ οὐκ ἀποκαλύψεις τὴν ἀσχημοσύνην αὐτῆς., 'and you shall not uncover the nakedness of her.' – LXX^{Swete} LXX^{Rahlfs} Brenton
την ασχημοσύνην αυτής ουκ αποκαλύψεις, 'the nakedness of her you shall not uncover' – ABP
omitted – OL^{L}

Leviticus 18:8

Confusionem mulieris patris tui non denudabis, confusionem patris tui et., '[The] confusion of your father's woman/wife you shall not denude: and is your father's confusion.' – OL^{L}
Turpitudinem uxoris patris tui non discooperies: turpitudo enim patris tui est., '[The] shame of your father's wife you shall not uncover: for it is your father's shame.' – Vg^{Colunga&Turrado}

Leviticus 18:9

עֶרְוַ֨ת אֲחֹֽותְךָ֤ בַת־אָבִ֙יךָ֙ אֹ֣ו בַת־אִמֶּ֔ךָ, ‘er-waṯ ’ă-ḥō-wṯ-ḵā ḇaṯ- ’ā-ḇî-ḵā ’ōw ḇaṯ- ’im-me-ḵā,, 'The nakedness of your sister (the) daughter of your father or (the) daughter of your mother' – WLC
ἀσχημοσύνην τῆς ἀδελφῆς σου ἐκ πατρός σου ἢ ἐκ μητρός σου, 'The nakedness of your sister out of your father or out of your mother' – LXX^{Rahlfs} Brenton ABP
ἀσχημοσύνην τῆς ἀδελφῆς σου ἐκ πατρός σου ἢ μητρός σου, 'The nakedness of your sister out of your father or (of) your mother' – LXX^{Swete}
Turpitudinem sororis tuae en matre tua et ex patre tuo, '[The] shame of your sister in your mother and out of your father' – OL^{W}
Confusionem sororis tuae uel ex patre uel ex matre, '[The] confusion of your sister either out of [your] father or out of [your] mother' – OL^{L}
Turpitudinem sororis tuae ex patre sive ex matre,, '[The] shame of your sister out of [your] father or out of [your] mother,' – Vg^{Colunga&Turrado}

Leviticus 18:9

η γεγεννημένης, 'or born' – LXX^{Rahlfs} Brenton ABP
γεγεννημένης ἢ, 'born or' – LXX^{Swete}
intus natae aut natae foris,, 'at home born or born outdoors,' – OL^{L}
quae domi vel foris genita est,, 'who is born at home or outdoors,' – Vg^{Colunga&Turrado}

Leviticus 18:9

quoniam tua confusione filiae uxoris patris tui non denudabis confusionem eius, 'because by/through your confusion of [the] daughter of your father's wife [you] shall not uncover his confusion' – OL^{L}
omitted – all other witnesses

Leviticus 18:10

Turpitudinem filiae filii tui vel neptis ex filia non revelabis: quia turpitudo tua est., '[You] shall not reveal [the] shame of your son's daughter or daughter's daughter: for [it] is your shame.' – Vg^{Colunga&Turrado}
omitted – OL^{L}

Leviticus 18:17

λήψῃ, 'shall take' – Brenton ABP (classical Greek spelling)
λήμψῃ, 'shall take' – LXX^{Swete} LXX^{Rahlfs} (Koine Greek spelling)

Leviticus 18:18

λήψῃ, 'shall take' – Brenton ABP (classical Greek spelling)
λήμψῃ, 'shall take' – LXX^{Swete} LXX^{Rahlfs} (Koine Greek spelling)

Leviticus 18:19

בְּנִדַּ֣ת טֻמְאָתָ֑הּ, bə-nid-daṯ ṭum-’ā-ṯāh, 'in menstrual/impure uncleanness' – WLC
εν χωρισμώ ακαθαρσίας αυτής, 'in separation of her uncleanness' – LXX^{Swete} ABP
in diuortio, 'in divorce/separation' – ^{wz}
in separationem munditiae eius, 'in separation of his cleanness' – OL^{L}
quae patitur menstrua, 'who suffers from menstruation' – Vg^{Colunga&Turrado}

Leviticus 18:19

לֹ֣א תִקְרַ֔ב, lō ṯiq-raḇ, '[you] shall not approach' – WLC
ουκ εισελεύση, '[you] shall not go into / enter' – Brenton ABP
οὐ προσελεύσῃ, '[you] shall not go towards' – LXX^{Swete} LXX^{Rahlfs}
non accedes,, '[you] shall not approach,' – OL^{L} Vg^{Colunga&Turrado}

Leviticus 18:20

Et ad mulierem proximi tui, 'And to your neighbour's woman/wife' – OL^{L}
Cum uxore proximi tui, 'With your neighbour's wife' – Vg^{Colunga&Turrado}

Leviticus 18:20

לֹא־תִתֵּ֥ן שְׁכָבְתְּךָ֖ לְזָ֑רַע, lō- ṯit-tên šə-ḵā-ḇə-tə-ḵā lə-zā-ra‘, '[you] shall not give copulation/intercourse seed/sowing/offspring' – WLC
οὐ δώσεις κοίτην σπέρματός σου, '[you] shall not give [the] marriage-bed for your sperm/semen' – LXX^{Swete} LXX^{Rahlfs} Brenton ABP
non dabis cubilem seminis tui,, '[you] shall not give the [bed] of your seed,' – OL^{L}
non coibis, nec seminis, '[you] shall not come together / have sex, nor... by seed/semen' – Vg^{Colunga&Turrado}

Leviticus 18:21, see also Moloch § Biblical attestations and Child sacrifice § Ban in Leviticus

וּמִֽזַּרְעֲךָ֥ לֹא־תִתֵּ֖ן לְהַעֲבִ֣יר לַמֹּ֑לֶךְ, ū-miz-zar-‘ă-ḵā lō- ṯit-tên lam-mō-leḵ, 'And [you] shall not let any of your descendents pass through [the fire, i.e. to sacrifice] to Moloch' – WLC
καὶ ἀπὸ τοῦ σπέρματός σου οὐ δώσεις λατρεύειν ἄρχοντι, 'And of your sperm/semen/offspring/descendants [you] shall not give to serve [an] archon' – LXX^{Swete} LXX^{Rahlfs} Brenton ABP
Et semini tuo non dabis seruire superposito,, 'And your seed you shall not give to serve placed on top,' – OL^{L}
De semine tuo non dabis ut consecretur idolo Moloch,, 'Of your semen/offspring [you] shall not give [any] to consecrate to [an] idol of Moloch,' – Vg^{Colunga&Turrado}

Leviticus 18:22, see also Leviticus 18 § Homosexuality

וְאֶ֨ת־זָכָ֔ר לֹ֥א תִשְׁכַּ֖ב מִשְׁכְּבֵ֣י אִשָּׁ֑ה תֹּועֵבָ֖ה הִֽוא׃, wə-’eṯ-zā-ḵār, lō’ ṯīš-kaḇ mīš-kə-ḇē ’īš-šā; tō-‘ē-ḇā hī’, 'And with a male, you shall not lie (down) on the beds of a woman/wife; he/it is an abomination.' – WLC
ࠅࠣࠀࠕ ࠆࠟࠊࠠࠓ ࠋࠞࠀ ࠕࠩࠔࠬࠊࠠࠁ ࠌࠡࠔࠬࠊࠠࠁࠩࠉ ࠀࠩࠔ࠙ࠢࠄ ࠕࠧࠅ࠙ࠜࠏࠁࠢࠄ ࠄࠩࠉࠀ, wa’t zā̊ː-kār lā̊ː’ tīš-kā̊b māːš-kå-bī ’īš-ša; tū-‘ē-bā’ ī’, 'And with a male, you shall not lie (down) on the beds of a woman/wife; she/it is an abomination.' – SP
καὶ μετὰ ἄρσενος οὐ κοιμηθήσῃ κοίτην γυναικός· βδέλυγμα γάρ ἐστιν., 'And with a man you shall not sleep in a (marriage-)bed of a woman/wife; because it is a detestable thing.' LXX^{Swete}
και μετά άρσενος ου κοιμηθήση κοίτην γυναικείαν βδέλυγμα γαρ εστι, 'And with a man you shall not sleep in a female (marriage-)bed, because it is a detestable thing.' ABP
Et cum masculo non dormibis cubile muliebrae: exsecratio enim est., 'And with [a] male you shall not sleep in [the/a] bed of [a] woman: for [it] is [a] curse.' – OL^{L}

The word muliebrae is an incorrect declension of muliebris; genitive singular (muliebris, "of a woman", "of womanly") was likely the intended form, compare fēminīnae ("of a woman(ly)", "of feminine").

Cum mare ne concumbas eo concubitu quo cum foemina solet: abominada res est., 'With [a] man [you] should not share the bed as is custom in [the] manner of sleeping as with [a] woman: [it] is [an] abominable thing.' – Robert Estienne (1545)
Cum masculo non commiscearis coitu femineo, quia abominatio est., 'With [a] male [you] shall not intermingle according to [the] feminine intercourse, because it is [an] abomination.' – Vg^{Clement} Vg^{Colunga&Turrado}

Compare Leviticus 20:13; Genesis 49:4.

Leviticus 18:23

לֹא־תִתֵּ֥ן שְׁכָבְתְּךָ֖, lō- ṯit-tên šə-ḵā-ḇə-tə-ḵā, '[you] shall not give lying/bedding(/copulation/intercourse)' – WLC
ου δώσεις τὴν κοίτην σου, '[you] shall not give the marriage-bed of yours' – LXX^{Swete} LXX^{Rahlfs} Brenton
ου δώσεις κοίτην σου, '[you] shall not give your marriage-bed' – ABP
non dabis cubilem tuum, '[you] shall not give your bed' – OL^{L}
non coibis, '[you] shall not come together' – Vg^{Colunga&Turrado}

Leviticus 18:23

εἰς σπερματισμὸν, 'for insemination / [a] discharge of sperm' – LXX^{Swete} LXX^{Rahlfs} Brenton ABP
in sementium, 'in [the] seed' – OL^{L}

sēmentium is a Late Latin nonstandard noun for "seed".

omitted – WLC Vg^{Colunga&Turrado}

Leviticus 18:25

εξεμιάνθη – Brenton ABP
ἐμιάνθη – LXX^{Swete} LXX^{Rahlfs}

Leviticus 18:25

ἀδικίαν αὐτοῖς – LXX^{Rahlfs} Brenton ABP
αὐτοῖς ἀδικίαν – LXX^{Swete}

Leviticus 18:26

πάντα τὰ προστάγματά, 'all the commandments' – LXX^{Swete} LXX^{Rahlfs} Brenton
τὰ προστάγματά, 'the commandments' – ABP

Leviticus 18:26

και, 'and' – LXX^{Rahlfs} Brenton ABP
ἢ, 'or' – LXX^{Swete}

Leviticus 18:27

πρότεροι, 'before [plural]' – LXX^{Swete} LXX^{Rahlfs}
πρότερον, 'before [singular]' – Brenton ABP

Leviticus 18:29

μέσου, 'from the middle/midst' – ABP
omitted – LXX^{Swete} LXX^{Rahlfs} Brenton

Leviticus 18:30

ποιήσητε, '[you] shall do [plural]' – LXX^{Swete} LXX^{Rahlfs} Brenton
ποιήτε, '[you] shall do [singular]' – ABP

Leviticus 18:30

ἃ, 'which' – LXX^{Rahlfs} Brenton ABP
ὃ, 'the' – LXX^{Swete}

=== Leviticus 20 ===
Leviticus 20:13

וְאִ֗ישׁ אֲשֶׁ֨ר יִשְׁכַּ֤ב אֶת־זָכָר֙ מִשְׁכְּבֵ֣י אִשָּׁ֔ה תֹּועֵבָ֥ה עָשׂ֖וּ שְׁנֵיהֶ֑ם מֹ֥ות יוּמָ֖תוּ דְּמֵיהֶ֥ם בָּֽם׃, wə-’îš, ’ă-šer yiš-kaḇ ’eṯ-zā-ḵār miš-kə-ḇê ’iš-šāh, tō-w-‘ê-ḇāh ‘ā-śū šə-nê-hem; mō-wṯ yū-mā-ṯū də-mê-hem bām., 'And a man, who sleeps with a male on the beds of a woman/wife, [they] have both done a detestable thing; [they] will be killed to die, [their] blood(guilt)s [are] on them.' – WLC
ואיש אשר ישכב את־זכר משכבי אשה תועבה עשו מות יומתו שניהם דמיהם בם׃, wə-’îš, ’ă-šer yiš-kaḇ ’eṯ-zā-ḵār miš-kə-ḇê ’iš-šāh, tō-w-‘ê-ḇāh ‘ā-śū; mō-wṯ yū-mā-ṯū šə-nê-hem də-mê-hem bām., 'And a man, who sleeps with a male on the beds of a woman/wife, [they] have done a detestable thing; both will be killed to die, [their] blood(guilt)s [are] on them.' – SP
καὶ ὃς ἂν κοιμηθῇ μετὰ ἄρσενος κοίτην γυναικός, βδέλυγμα ἐποίησαν ἀμφότεροι· θανατούσθωσαν, ἔνοχοί εἰσιν., 'And who ever slept with [a] male in the (marriage-)bed of a woman/wife, both have done a detestable thing; let [them] be put to death, they are liable/guilty.' – LXX^{Swete}
καὶ ὃς ἂν κοιμηθῇ μετὰ ἄρσενος κοίτην γυναικός, βδέλυγμα ἐποίησαν ἀμφότεροι· θανάτῳ θανατούσθωσαν, ἔνοχοί εἰσιν., 'And whoever shall lie with a male as with a woman/wife, they have both wrought abomination; let them die the death, they are guilty.' – Brenton
και ος αν κοιμηθή μετά άρσενος κοίτην γυναικός, βδέλυγμα εποίησαν αμφότεροι θανάτω θανατούσθωσαν ένοχοί εισιν., 'And who ever slept with [a] male in the (marriage-)bed of a woman/wife, both have done a detestable thing; let [them] be killed to death, or [they] have done a detestable thing; let both be killed to death, they are liable/guilty.' – ABP
Qui dormierit cum masculo coitu femineo, uterque operatus est nefas: morte moriantur: sit sanguis eorum super eos., 'Whoever sleeps with a male according to the feminine intercourse, both have done a wrong: let them die the death: may their blood be upon them.' – Vg^{Clement} Vg^{Colunga&Turrado}

Compare Leviticus 18:22; Genesis 49:4.

=== Leviticus 25 ===
Leviticus 25:42

אֲשֶׁר־הֹוצֵ֥אתִי אֹתָ֖ם מֵ, ’ă-šer- hō-w-ṣê-ṯî ’ō-ṯām mê-, 'whom [I] brought out of/from' – WLC
οὓς ἐξήγαγον, 'whom [I] led out' – LXX^{Swete} LXX^{Rahlfs} Brenton ABP
quos eduxi, 'whom [I] led out' – OL^{L}
et ego eduxi eos, 'and I led them out' – Vg^{Colunga&Turrado}

Leviticus 25:42

לֹ֥א יִמָּכְר֖וּ מִמְכֶּ֥רֶת עָֽבֶד׃, lō yim-mā-ḵə-rū mim-ke-reṯ ‘ā-ḇeḏ., '[they] shall not be sold in [a] sale of [a] slave.' – WLC
οὐ πραθήσεται ἐν πράσει οἰκέτου., '[they] shall not be sold in [a] sale of [a] household slave.' – LXX^{Swete} LXX^{Rahlfs} Brenton ABP
Non ueniet uenalido serui., '[He] will not come as [a] buyable/cheap slave.' – OL^{L}
non veneant conditione servorum:, 'let [them] not come in(to) [the] condition of slaves:' – Vg^{Colunga&Turrado}

Leviticus 25:43

וְיָרֵ֖אתָ מֵאֱלֹהֶֽיךָ׃, wə-yā-rê-ṯā mê-’ĕ-lō-he-ḵā., 'and/but [you] shall fear your god.' – WLC
καὶ φοβηθήσῃ Κύριον τὸν θεόν σου., 'and/but [you] shall fear (the) Lord your god' – LXX^{Swete} LXX^{Rahlfs} Brenton
και φοβηθήση τον θεόν σου, 'and/but [you] shall fear your god' – ABP
et timebis Deum tuum., 'and [you] shall fear your God.' – OL^{L}
sed metuito Deum tuum., 'but [you/he] shall fear your God.' – Vg^{Colunga&Turrado}

Leviticus 25:44

אֲשֶׁ֣ר יִהְיוּ־לָ֑ךְ, ’ă-šer yih-yū- lāḵ, 'whom you may have [plural]' – WLC
ὅσοι ἂν γένωνταί σοι, 'as many as should be to you [singular]' – LXX^{Swete} LXX^{Rahlfs} Brenton ABP
quicumque fuerunt, 'who(so)ever have been [plural]' – OL^{L}
sint vobis, 'should be to/for you [plural]' – Vg^{Colunga&Turrado}

Leviticus 25:44

אֲשֶׁ֣ר, ’ă-šer, 'which' – WLC
όσοι, 'as many as' – LXX^{Swete} LXX^{Rahlfs} Brenton ABP
quae, 'which' – OL^{L} Vg^{Colunga&Turrado}

Leviticus 25:44

מֵהֶ֥ם תִּקְנ֖וּ עֶ֥בֶד וְאָמָֽה׃, mê-hem tiq-nū ‘e-ḇeḏ wə-’ā-māh., 'from them [you] may buy/acquire (a) male slave and (a) female slave.' – WLC
ἀπ᾽ αὐτῶν κτήσεσθε δοῦλον καὶ δούλην., 'from them [you] shall acquire/buy (a) male slave and (a) female slave.' – LXX^{Swete} LXX^{Rahlfs} Brenton ABP
ab illis possidebitis,, 'from them [you] will inherit' – OL^{L}
omitted – Vg^{Colunga&Turrado}

Leviticus 25:45

אֲשֶׁ֣ר עִמָּכֶ֔ם, ’ă-šer ‘im-mā-ḵem, 'who/which [are] with you' – WLC
των μεθ' υμών, 'of the ones with you [plural]' – ABP
omitted – LXX^{Swete} LXX^{Rahlfs} Brenton OL^{L} Vg^{Colunga&Turrado}

== See also ==
- List of Hebrew Bible manuscripts

== Bibliography ==
- Biblia: quid in hac editione praestitum sit. Translated by Estienne, Robert. 1545.
- Biblos.com & Helps Ministries (2011–2018). "Interlinear Bible (Westminster Leningrad Codex – English)". Biblehub.com.
- Brenton, Lancelot Charles Lee (1851). "Brenton's Septuagint Translation". Biblehub.com.
- Brenton, Lancelot Charles Lee (1879). The Septuagint version of the OT, with an English translation (PDF). London: Samuel Bagster. p. 1156.
- Brooke, Alan England; McLean, Norman; Thackeray, Henry St. John (1909). The Old Testament in Greek. Volume I: The Octateuch. Part II: Exodus and Leviticus. Cambridge: Cambridge University Press. p. 268.
- Rahlfs, Alfred (1935). "Λευιτικόν (Leviticus Rahlfs)". Alfred Rahlfs' edition of the Septuagint (in Greek). Greek Wikisource.
- Robert, Ulysse (1881). Pentateuchi versio latina antiquissima e Codice Lugdunensi. Paris: Firmin-Didot. p. 330.
- Scholz, Susanne (2021). Sacred Witness. Rape in the Hebrew Bible. Fortress Press. ISBN 9781506482033. (E-book edition)
- Swete, Henry Barclay (1930). "Swete's Septuagint". Biblehub.com.
- Emanuel Tov, The Text-Critical Use of the Septuagint in Biblical Research (TCU), 1981 (1st edition), 1997 (2nd edition), 2015 (3rd edition).
- Emanuel Tov, Textual Criticism of the Hebrew Bible (TCHB), 1992 (1st edition), 2001 (2nd edition), 2012 (3rd edition).
- Emanuel Tov, Textual Criticism of the Hebrew Bible, Qumran, Septuagint: Collected Writings, Volume 3 (2015).
- Tov, Emanuel (1999). "38. The Septuagint Additions ('Miscellanies') in 1 Kings 2 (3 Reigns 2)". The Greek and Hebrew Bible: Collected Essays on the Septuagint. Vetus Testamentum Supplements. Vol. 72. Leiden: Brill.
- van de Giessen, J. P. (2003). "Index Bijbelverzen". bijbelaantekeningen.nl (in Dutch).
- Van der Pool, Charles (1996). "Apostolic Bible Polyglot (ABP)". Biblehub.com.
- Wells, Bruce (2020). "On the Beds of a Woman: The Leviticus Texts on Same-Sex Relations Reconsidered". Sexuality and Law in the Torah. Bloomsbury Publishing. pp. 123–158. ISBN 9780567681607.
