= Textual variants in the Book of Numbers =

Differences in Book of Numbers manuscripts

Textual variants in the Numbers concerns textual variants in the Hebrew Bible found in the Book of Numbers.

== Legend ==
Purported inter-relationship between significant ancient Old Testament manuscripts (some identified by their siglum).

Frequently used sigla (symbols and abbreviations) of Hebrew Bible manuscripts and editions include:

א: Codex Sinaiticus
A: Codex Alexandrinus
B: Codex Vaticanus (Roman Septuagint)
C: Codex Ephraemi Rescriptus
ABP: Apostolic Bible Polyglot
AC: Aleppo Codex
BHS: Biblia Hebraica Stuttgartensia
Brenton: Brenton's Septuagint Translation 1879
LC: Leningrad Codex
LXX: Septuagint (list)
LXX^{Rahlfs}: Rahlfs' Septuagint 1935
LXX^{Swete}: Swete's Septuagint 1930
K: ketiv
Kennicott^{x}: Kennicott's Vetus Test. Hebraicum
MAM: Miqra according to the Masorah
m.: Mishna
MT or 𝕸: Masoretic Text
MT^{Ginsburg}: C.D. Ginsburg's Masoretic Text
OL or: Old Latin / Vetus Latina (list)
Q: qere
xQx: Dead Sea Scrolls (list)
S: Peshitta
SP: Samaritan Pentateuch
Tg: Targum
Tg^{Be}: Targum Berlin Orientalis 1213
Tg^{J}: Targum Jonathan
Tg^{O}: Targum Onqelos
Tg^{N}: Targum Neofiti
Tg^{PJ}: Targum Pseudo-Jonathan
Vg: Vulgate (list)
Vg^{Clement}: Clementine Vulgate 1592
Vg^{Colunga&Turrado}: A. Colunga & L. Turrado's Vulgata 1946
Vg^{neo}: Nova Vulgata 1979
WLC: Westminster Leningrad Codex

== List ==
This list provides examples of known textual variants, and contains the following parameters: Hebrew texts written right to left, the Hebrew text romanised left to right, an approximate English translation, and which Hebrew manuscripts or critical editions of the Hebrew Bible this textual variant can be found in. Greek (Septuagint) and Latin (Vulgate) texts are written left to right, and not romanised. Sometimes additional translation or interpretation notes are added, with references to similar verses elsewhere, or in-depth articles on the topic in question.

=== Numbers 22 ===
Numbers 22:1

בְּעַֽרְבֹ֣ות מֹואָ֔ב, bə-‘ar-ḇō-wṯ mō-w-’āḇ,, 'in the plains of Moab' – WLC
בערבת מואב, bə-‘ar-wṯ mō-w-’āḇ,, 'in the evening/west of Moab' – SP
ἐπὶ δυσμῶν Μωὰβ, 'on the west of Moab / upon the descent/sunset of Moab' – LXX^{Swete} LXX^{Rahlfs} Brenton ABP

The words עֲרָבָה arabah/'aravá ("steppe", "desert", "plain"), עֶרֶב érev ("evening", "sunset") and מַעֲרָב ma'aráv ("west") are all etymologically related to each other, and maybe also cognates of words such as "Europe" (see Europe § Name) and "Arab" (see Etymology of Arab). See also Numbers 31:12.

=== Numbers 31 ===
Numbers 31 in Brenton's Septuagint translation (1879)

Numbers 31:12

עַֽרְבֹ֣ת מוֹאָ֔ב, ‘ar-ḇōṯ mō-w-’āḇ,, 'the plains/desert/wilderness of Moab' – WLC
Ἀραβὼθ Μωάβ,, 'Araboth Moab,' – LXX^{Swete} Brenton
αραβώθ Μωάβ, '[the] wilderness of Moab' – ABP

It is unclear whether the Hebrew original meant a general geographical feature ('plains/desert/wilderness') or a specific toponym (probably the region now known as "Arabah"), or whether Greek translators failed to translate מוֹאָ֔ב ‘ar-ḇōṯ as a general geographical feature and turned it into a specific toponym, and hence the Arabah region got its name from this toponymisation. See also Numbers 22:1.

Numbers 31:15

וַיֹּ֥אמֶר אֲלֵיהֶ֖ם מֹשֶׁ֑ה הַֽחִיִּיתֶ֖ם כָּל־נְקֵבָֽה׃, way-yō-mer ’ă-lê-hem mō-šeh; ha-ḥî-yî-ṯem kāl-nə-qê-ḇāh., 'And Moses said to them: 'Have you kept alive all the women?' – MT
וַיֹּ֥אמֶר אֲלֵיהֶ֖ם מֹשֶׁ֑ה למה הַֽחִיִּיתֶ֖ם כָּל־נְקֵבָֽה׃, way-yō-mer ’ă-lê-hem mō-šeh; lá-ma ha-ḥî-yî-ṯem kāl-nə-qê-ḇāh., 'And Moses said to them: 'Why have you kept alive all the women?' – SP
καὶ εἶπεν αὐτοῖς Μωυσῆς Ἵνα τί ἐζωγρήσατε πᾶν θῆλυ;, 'And Moses said to them: 'Why did you take/catch/save alive every female?' – LXX^{Swete}
καὶ εἶπεν αὐτοῖς Μωυσῆς ινατί ἐζωγρήσατε πᾶν θῆλυ, 'And Moses said to them: 'Why did you take/catch/save alive every female?' – ABP Brenton

Numbers 31:16

לִמְסָר־מַ֥עַל בַּיהוָ֖ה, lim·sār-ma·‘al Yah·weh, 'to trespass / to instigate sacrilege against Yahweh' – MT
τοῦ ἀποστῆσαι καὶ ὑπεριδεῖν τὸ ῥῆμα Κυρίου, 'of their leaving / moving away from and disgarding the word of the Lord' – LXX^{Swete} ABP Brenton. ἀποστῆσαι is a cognate of the English word "apostasy".

See also Numbers 31 § Tabernacle desecration hypothesis.

Numbers 31:16

עַל־דְּבַר־פְּעֹ֑ור, ‘al-də-ḇar-pə-‘ō-wr;, 'in the incident of Peor' – MT
ἕνεκεν Φογώρ, 'because of Phogor' – LXX^{Swete} ABP Brenton

Numbers 31:17

וְעַתָּ֕ה הִרְג֥וּ כָל־זָכָ֖ר בַּטָּ֑ף, wə-‘at-tāh hir-ḡū ḵāl zā-ḵār baṭ-ṭāp̄;, 'Therefore, kill every male among the little ones / infants / (little) children' – MT
καὶ νῦν ἀποκτείνατε πᾶν ἀρσενικὸν ἐν πάσῃ τῇ ἀπαρτίᾳ, 'And now kill every male among all the spoils/captivity/chattel' – LXX^{Swete} ABP Brenton

Numbers 31:17

וְכָל־אִשָּׁ֗ה יֹדַ֥עַת אִ֛ישׁ לְמִשְׁכַּ֥ב זָכָ֖ר הֲרֹֽגוּ׃, wə-ḵāl ’iš-šāh, yō-ḏa-‘aṯ ’îš lə-miš-kaḇ zā-ḵār hă-rō-ḡū., 'and every woman, who has known a man in a male bed / by lying with him, kill.' – MT
καὶ πᾶσαν γυναῖκα ἥτις ἔγνωκεν κοίτην ἄρσενος ἀποκτείνατε·, 'And every woman who knew [the] marriage-bed of a man, kill!' – LXX^{Swete} ABP
πᾶσαν γυναῖκα, ἥτις ἔγνωκεν κοίτην ἄρσενος, ἀποκτείνατε., 'slay every woman, who has known the lying with man.' – Brenton

Compare Judges 21:11.

Numbers 31:18

וְכֹל֙ הַטַּ֣ף בַּנָּשִׁ֔ים, wə-ḵōl haṭ-ṭap̄ ban-nā-šîm,, '[But] all the young women / women-children / girls,' – WLC
πᾶσαν τὴν ἀπαρτίαν τῶν γυναικῶν, 'All the spoils/captivity/chattel of the women' – LXX^{Swete}
Καὶ πᾶσαν τὴν ἀπαρτίαν τῶν γυναικῶν,, 'And [as for] all the captivity of women' – Brenton
και πάσαν την απαρτίαν των γυναικών, 'And all the chattel of the women' – ABP

Numbers 31:18

אֲשֶׁ֥ר לֹא־יָדְע֖וּ מִשְׁכַּ֣ב זָכָ֑ר, ’ă-šer lō-yā-ḏə-‘ū miš-kaḇ zā-ḵār;, 'who have not known a male bed / a man intimately / a man by lying with him,' – WLC
ἥτις οὐκ οἶδεν κοίτην ἄρσενος,, 'who have not known a/the male bed,'– LXX^{Swete}
ἥτις οὐκ οἶδε κοίτην ἄρσενος,, 'who have not known the lying with man, / [the] marriage-bed of a man,' – Brenton ABP

Numbers 31:18

הַחֲי֖וּ לָכֶֽם׃, ha-ḥă-yū lā-ḵem., 'spare/save them / keep them alive for yourselves.' – WLC
ζωγρήσατε αὐτάς., 'save ye them alive / take/capture them alive / for life!'– LXX^{Swete} Brenton ABP

Compare Judges 21:11

=== Numbers 32 ===
Numbers 32:1

גָ֖ד, ḡāḏ, 'Gad' – MT
גד ולחצי שבט המנשה, ḡāḏ wə-la-ḥă-ṣî šê-ḇeṭ mə-naš-šeh, 'Gad and the half tribe of Manasseh' – [4QNum^{b}] SP
Γαδ, 'Gad' – LXX^{Swete} ABP Brenton

Compare Numbers 32:33

Numbers 32:2

בְנֵֽי־גָ֖ד וּבְנֵ֣י רְאוּבֵ֑ן, ḇə-nê-ḡāḏ ū-ḇə-nê rə-’ū-ḇên;, 'the sons of Gad and the sons of Reuben' – MT
בני גד ובני ראובן וחצי שבט המנשה, ḇə-nê-ḡāḏ ū-ḇə-nê rə-’ū-ḇên wə-ḥă-ṣî šê-ḇeṭ mə-naš-šeh;, 'the sons of Gad and the sons of Reuben and the half tribe of Manasseh' – SP
οἱ υἱοὶ Ρουβην καὶ οἱ υἱοὶ Γαδ, 'the sons of Rouben and the sons of Gad' – LXX^{Swete} ABP Brenton

Numbers 32:3

וְנִמְרָ֔ה, wə-nim-rāh,, 'and Nimrah' – MT SP
καὶ Ναμβρα, 'and Nambra' – LXX^{Swete} Brenton
και Ναμβρών, 'and Nambron' – ABP

Numbers 32:4

הִ֑וא, hî, 'he or is' – MT, see also en:wikt:הוא#Hebrew
היא, hu, 'she or it' – SP, see also en:wikt:היא#Hebrew
ἐστίν, 'is' – LXX^{Swete}
εστί, 'is' – ABP Brenton

Numbers 32:6

לִבְנֵי־גָ֖ד וְלִבְנֵ֣י רְאוּבֵ֑ן, liḇ-nê-ḡāḏ wə-liḇ-nê rə-’ū-ḇên;, 'to the sons of Gad and (to) the sons of Reuben' – MT
לבני ראובן ולבני גד ולחצי שבט המנשה, liḇ-nê-rə-’ū-ḇên wə-liḇ-nê ḡāḏ wə-la-ḥă-ṣî šê-ḇeṭ mə-naš-šeh;, 'to the sons of Reuben and (to) the sons of Gad and (to) the half tribe of Manasseh' – [4QNum^{b}] SP
τοῖς υἱοῖς Γαδ καὶ τοῖς υἱοῖς Ρουβην, 'to the sons of Gad and (to) the sons of Rouben' – LXX^{Swete} ABP Brenton

== See also ==
- List of Hebrew Bible manuscripts

== Bibliography ==
- Biblos.com & Helps Ministries (2011–2018). "Interlinear Bible (Westminster Leningrad Codex – English)". Biblehub.com.
- Brenton, Lancelot Charles Lee (1851). "Brenton's Septuagint Translation". Biblehub.com.
- Brenton, Lancelot Charles Lee (1879). The Septuagint version of the OT, with an English translation (PDF). London: Samuel Bagster. p. 1156.
- Rahlfs, Alfred (1935). "Αριθμοί (Numbers Rahlfs)". Alfred Rahlfs' edition of the Septuagint (in Greek). Greek Wikisource.
- Scholz, Susanne (2021). Sacred Witness. Rape in the Hebrew Bible. Fortress Press. ISBN 9781506482033. (E-book edition)
- Swete, Henry Barclay (1930). "Swete's Septuagint". Biblehub.com.
- Emanuel Tov, The Text-Critical Use of the Septuagint in Biblical Research (TCU), 1981 (1st edition), 1997 (2nd edition), 2015 (3rd edition).
- Emanuel Tov, Textual Criticism of the Hebrew Bible (TCHB), 1992 (1st edition), 2001 (2nd edition), 2012 (3rd edition).
- Emanuel Tov, Textual Criticism of the Hebrew Bible, Qumran, Septuagint: Collected Writings, Volume 3 (2015).
- Tov, Emanuel (1999). "38. The Septuagint Additions ('Miscellanies') in 1 Kings 2 (3 Reigns 2)". The Greek and Hebrew Bible: Collected Essays on the Septuagint. Vetus Testamentum Supplements. Vol. 72. Leiden: Brill.
- van de Giessen, J. P. (2003). "Index Bijbelverzen". bijbelaantekeningen.nl (in Dutch).
- Van der Pool, Charles (1996). "Apostolic Bible Polyglot (ABP)". Biblehub.com.
- Wells, Bruce (2020). "On the Beds of a Woman: The Leviticus Texts on Same-Sex Relations Reconsidered". Sexuality and Law in the Torah. Bloomsbury Publishing. pp. 123–158. ISBN 9780567681607.
