= Septuagint English Tanakh =

Public-domain English translation of the Septuagint in Tanakh order

- Full name: The Septuagint English Tanakh: The Hebrew Bible according to the Old Greek
- Abbreviation: SET
- Apocrypha: Yes (as an appendix, "The Outside Books")
- Textual basis: Old Testament: Göttingen Septuagint where published, otherwise Rahlfs–Hanhart; English base text revised from the Masoretic English Tanakh (itself revised from the Berean Standard Bible); appendix revised from the World English Bible
- Translation type: Formal equivalence, revised to follow the Greek
- Copyright: Public domain
- Website: archive.org/details/septuagint-english-tanakh

The Septuagint English Tanakh (SET) is a public domain English translation of the Septuagint, published on the Internet Archive in 2026. Unlike earlier English Septuagints, it puts the books in the order of the Tanakh and places the books not found in the Hebrew Bible in an appendix.

== Background ==
Earlier English versions of the Septuagint, including Brenton's (1844), A New English Translation of the Septuagint (2007) and the Lexham English Septuagint (2012), follow the book order of the Greek manuscripts. The SET treats the Septuagint as a Jewish translation of the Hebrew Bible and arranges it accordingly. It was produced as a companion to the Masoretic English Tanakh, a translation of the Masoretic Text.

== Translation ==
The Greek text is that of the Göttingen Septuagint where a volume has been published, and otherwise Rahlfs–Hanhart. The English was not made from scratch: the Masoretic English Tanakh was revised verse by verse to follow the Greek. About 15,000 footnotes show where the Hebrew differs.

Some Greek words get the same English everywhere. Angelos is "messenger", hadēs "the Underworld", diabolos "the slanderer" and christos "anointed". The sōzō word group is translated "deliver" rather than "save", and the hilastērion on the Ark of the Covenant is the "propitiation". Names are mostly given in Hebrew forms, such as Achashverosh for Artaxerxes in Esther, and outside Maccabees Ioudaios is "Judahite".

== Contents ==
The Torah, Prophets and Writings follow the Hebrew order. Psalms includes Psalm 151, and Esther and Daniel include their Greek additions. The appendix, "The Outside Books" (Hebrew sefarim hitzoniyim), holds 1 Esdras, Judith, Tobit, 1–4 Maccabees, Wisdom, Ben Sira, the Psalms of Solomon, Baruch, the Letter of Jeremiah and the Prayer of Manasseh. Verse numbers follow the Greek, with the Hebrew numbers in brackets where they differ.

== Editions ==
The SET is available as PDF, EPUB and USFM files. A Reader's Edition leaves out the footnotes.

== See also ==
- Septuagint
- Bible translations into English
- New English Translation of the Septuagint
- The Septuagint version of the Old Testament (Brenton)
