= Odes of Solomon =

1st-century CE set of 42 Christian poems

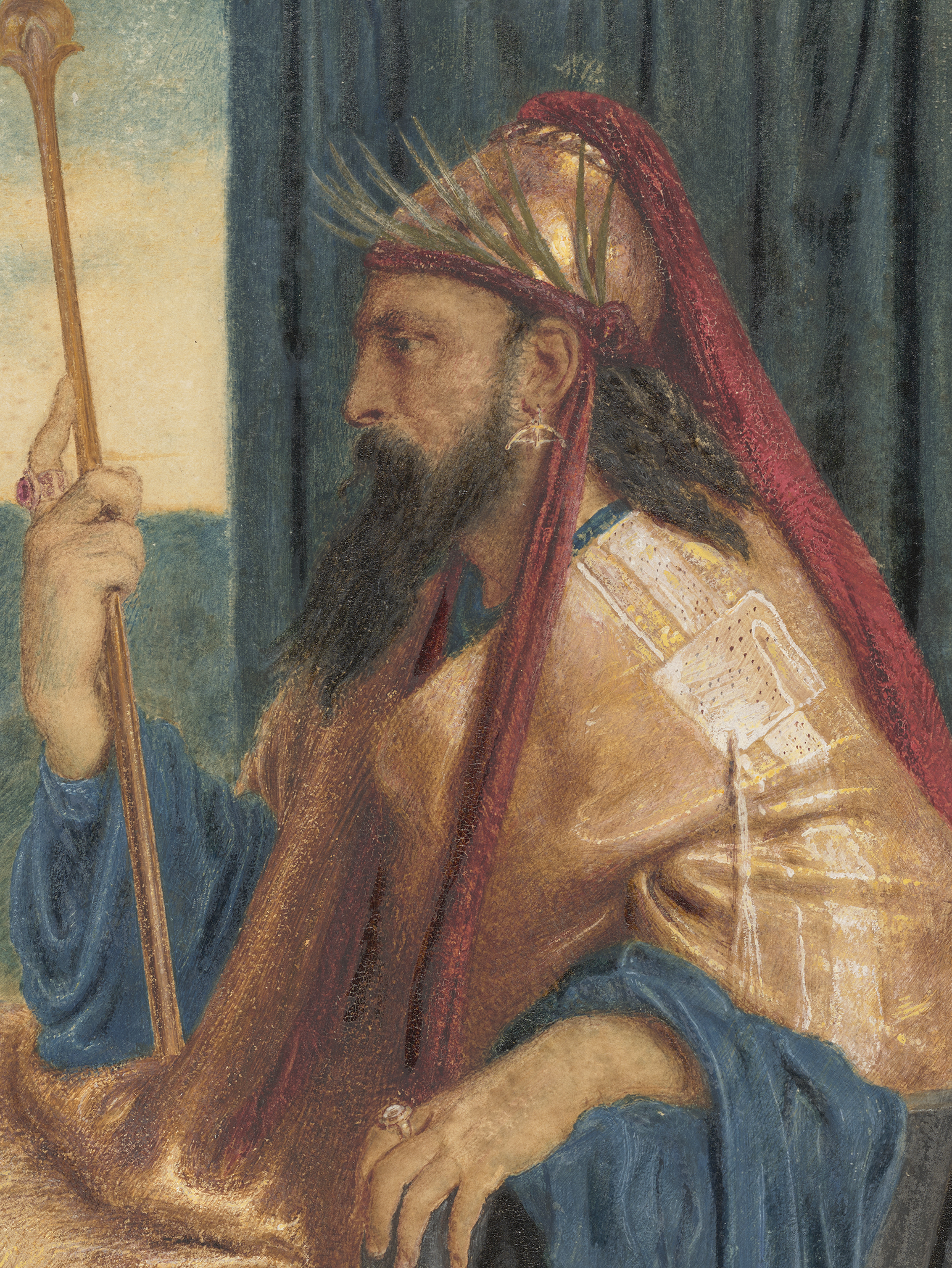
King Solomon, to whom the Odes have been attributed

The Odes of Solomon are a collection of 42 odes, anonymous but long attributed to Solomon. There used to be confusion among scholars on the dating of the Odes of Solomon; however, most scholars date it to somewhere between AD 70 and 125. The original language of the Odes is thought to have been either Greek or Syriac, and the majority of scholars believe it to have been written by a Jewish Christian, very likely a convert from the Essene community to Christianity, because it contains multiple similarities to writings found in Qumran and to the Gospel of John. Some have argued that the writer had even personally seen John the Baptist.

Some scholars in the past have suggested a Gnostic origin, but this viewpoint has come under heavy scrutiny, and it is now often viewed as a proto-orthodox writing.

== Manuscript history ==
After the discovery of portions of the Odes of Solomon in Pistis Sophia, a Gnostic text discovered in 1773, scholars searched to find more complete copies. In 1909, James Rendel Harris discovered a pile of forgotten leaves from a Syriac manuscript lying on a shelf in his study. Unfortunately, all he could recall was that they came from the "neighbourhood of the Tigris". The manuscript (Cod. Syr. 9 in the John Rylands Library) is the most complete of the extant texts of the Odes. The manuscript begins with the second strophe of the first verse of Ode 3 (the first two odes have been lost). The manuscript gives the entire corpus of the Odes of Solomon through to the end of Ode 42. Then the Psalms of Solomon (earlier Jewish religious poetry that is often bound with the later Odes) follow, until the beginning of Psalm 17:38 and the end of the manuscript has been lost. However, the Harris manuscript is a late copy—certainly no earlier than the 15th century.

== Authorship ==
=== Language and date ===
Although earlier scholars thought the Odes were originally written in Greek or Hebrew, there is now a consensus that Syriac/Aramaic was the original language. Their place of origin seems likely to have been the region of Syria. Estimates of the date of composition range from the first to the third century AD, with many settling on the second century. Some have claimed that Ode 4 discusses the closing of the temple at Leontopolis in Egypt, which would date this writing about 73 AD. One of the strong arguments for an early date is the discovery of references to, and perhaps even quotations from, the Odes in the writings of St. Ignatius of Antioch. Possible allusions were also made by Justin Martyr and Irenaeus, which also supports an early date. The Odes have clear similarities to the Gospel of John, which suggests the writer was in the same community as where the book was written.

There is wide agreement that the Odes are related to the Gospel of John and the Dead Sea scrolls, thus Charlesworth concludes that the writer was an Essene convert to the Johannine community.

=== Liturgical use ===
The Odes of Solomon were, perhaps, composed for liturgical use. In the Syriac manuscripts, all of the Odes end with a hallelujah, and the Harris manuscript marks this word in the middle of an ode by the Syriac letter hê (ܗ). The use of plural imperative and jussive verb forms suggest that on occasion a congregation is being addressed. Bernard, Aune, Pierce and others who have commented on the Odes find in them clear early baptismal imagery—water is an ever-present theme (floods, drinking the living waters, drowning and the well-spring) as is the language of conversion and initiation. Charlesworth has led the criticism of this view.

== Themes ==
=== Evangelism ===
The Odes reflect a surprising emphasis on spreading the knowledge of God, and conversion of others.

According to James H. Charlesworth, "the key characteristic in these hymns is a joyous tone of thanksgiving for the advent of the Messiah who had been promised (cf. Ode 7:1–6; 41:3–7) and for the present experience of eternal life and love from and for the Beloved (3:1–9; 11:1–24; 23:1–3; 26:1–7; 40:1–6)".

== Theology ==
Though there is some dispute, according to Chadwick the Odes are likely part of the proto-Orthodox Christian strain, with slight differences, as Odist appears to have mixed ideas from the Essene community with Christianity.

=== Soteriology ===
The Odes of Solomon have early trinitarian theology.

It has been noted that the Odes seem to imply a predestinarian view of salvation; for example, they state, "And before they had existed, I recognized them; and imprinted a seal on their faces." According to the American New Testament scholar Thomas R. Schreiner, the soteriology of the Odes is highly grace oriented being underlined by a doctrine of election and he argued the writer saw salvation as a work of God which is not accomplished by human merit. Thomas R. Schreiner and Brian J. Arnold argued that the book supports a form of imputed righteousness. Others, however, do not agree with the conclusion that the book must be interpreted in light of unconditional election, rather stating that the Odes may still be interpreted in light of conditional election based on foreknowledge.

=== Eschatology ===
The book makes mention of the Antichrist figuratively, using the word "dragon" for the Antichrist.

The Odes perhaps references the general resurrection.

=== Christology ===
Some in the past have argued that the book has docetic leanings, however it also appears to suggest that the birth of Jesus, though miraculous, was still a human birth, which would contradict docetism. It is also plausible that Ignatius of Antioch who opposed docetism (or vice versa) referenced the Odes of Solomon in his writings. Odes 8:5–6 have also been argued to refer to the resurrection of Christ. Moreover, the strong ties of the Odes to the Johannine works suggests against docetism.

The Odes of Solomon mention Christ as the Logos and that he is pre-existent. The Odes contain many common Christian teachings, such as the Messiah is the Son of God and the atonement of Jesus. The Odist calls Jesus both the son of Man and Son of God.

The Odes possibly contain the earliest non-biblical attestation of the virgin birth, depending on the date of writing.

The book mentions the mother of the Messiah, and alludes to his death by crucifixion and descent into Hades.

=== Trinity ===
The book mentions the "Father, Son and the Holy Spirit" and seems to have trinitarian theology without any indications of subordinationism unlike later Tertullian and Origen would have.

=== Baptism ===
The book also apparently makes allusions to baptism but not to the Eucharist. Possible baptismal themes include renewal (Ode 36:5), new creation (Ode 15:8, 21:3), the sealing of the Holy Spirit (Ode 4:7), entry into paradise (Ode 11:16), the Trinitarian formula (Ode 23:22), and circumcision (Ode 11). The presence of these themes has led some scholars to argue that the Odes are a collection of baptismal hymns. The writer seems to have been influenced by Jewish apocalyptic thought and mysticism.

=== Other ===
The Odist perhaps has an understanding of "priesthood of all believers", seeing himself as an individual priest offering spiritual sacrifices.

The Odes says that Mary had no pain during childbirth and the midwife was absent, which suggests the doctrine of virginitas in partu meaning that Mary was still a virgin after childbirth. The statement has however also been interpreted as a metaphorical allusion to the Exodus story, where Jewish women had very quick childbirth, which is why the Egyptian midwives could not come fast enough.

== Relation to Catholic and canonical texts ==
There are parallels in both style, and theology, between Odes and the writing of Ignatius of Antioch, as well as with the canonical Gospel of John. For example, both Odes and John use the concept of Jesus as Logos, and write in gentle metaphors. Harris lists the following similarities in theme between the Odes and the Johannine literature:

- Christ is the Word
- Christ existed before the foundation of the world (Odes 31, 33)
- Christ bestows living water abundantly
- Christ is the door to everything
- Christ stands to His people in the relation of Lover to Beloved
- Believers love the Lord because He first loved them (Ode 3.3)
- Believers' love to the Christ makes them His friends (Ode 8)

It has been suggested that Ode 22:12 ("the foundation of everything is Your [God's] rock. And upon it You have built Your kingdom, and it became the dwelling-place of the holy ones")) may be an earlier version of the saying in Matthew 16.18

== Relation to Gnosticism ==
Some have doubted the orthodoxy of the Odes, suggesting that they perhaps originated from a heretical or gnostic group. This can be seen in the extensive use of the word "knowledge" (Syr. ܝܕܥܬܐ īḏa‘tâ; Gk. γνωσις gnōsis), the slight suggestion that the Saviour needed saving in Ode 8:21c (ܘܦ̈ܖܝܩܐ ܒܗܘ ܕܐܬܦܪܩ wafrîqê ḇ-haw d'eṯpreq—"and the saved (are) in him who was saved") and the image of the Father having breasts that are milked by the Holy Spirit to bring about the incarnation of Christ. In the case of "knowledge", it is always a reference to God's gift of his self-revelation, and, as the Odes are replete with enjoyment in God's good creation, they seem at odds with the gnostic concept of knowledge providing the means of release from the imperfect world. The other images are sometimes considered marks of heresy in the odist, but do have some parallel in early patristic literature.

Scholars such as H. Chadwick, Emerton, and Charlesworth are fully convinced that the text has nothing to do with Gnosticism.

=== Parallels with Mandaeism ===
Eric Segelberg (1958) notes similarities the Odes of Solomon share various similarities with the Mandaean Qolasta prayers, including baptism in water, signation, drinking of water, investiture, coronation, and ritual meals.

== Modern influence ==
The Odes of Solomon have inspired modern musicians and their projects. In 2010, composer John Schreiner released a two-disc album called The Odes Project, which is an adaptation of the Odes of Solomon into modern music. The album Odes by Arthur Hatton, creator of LDS music website Linescratchers, was inspired by the Odes of Solomon and incorporated lines from the poems into its lyrics.

== See also ==
- Psalms of Solomon (1st-century text)
- Wisdom of Solomon
- Apostolic fathers
