= Hexapla =

Ancient critical edition of the Hebrew Bible

The inter-relationship between various ancient versions of the Old Testament, between ca. 400 BC and AD 600, according to the Encyclopaedia Biblica. Origen's Hexapla, here labelled with the adjectival Hexaplar, is shown as the source of the Codex Sinaiticus (א), Codex Alexandrinus (A) and Codex Vaticanus (B), three of the oldest extant manuscripts of the Greek Old Testament, as well as of two early Syro-Aramaic translations, the Harklean and Palestinian versions.

Hexapla (Koine Greek: Ἑξαπλᾶ, lit. 'sixfold'), also called Origenis Hexaplorum, is a critical edition of the Hebrew Bible in six versions, four of them translated into Greek, preserved only in fragments. It was an immense and complex word-for-word comparison of the original Hebrew Scriptures with the Greek Septuagint translation and with other Greek translations.

The term especially and generally applies to the polyglot edition of the Old Testament compiled by the early Christian theologian and scholar Origen sometime before 240 CE.

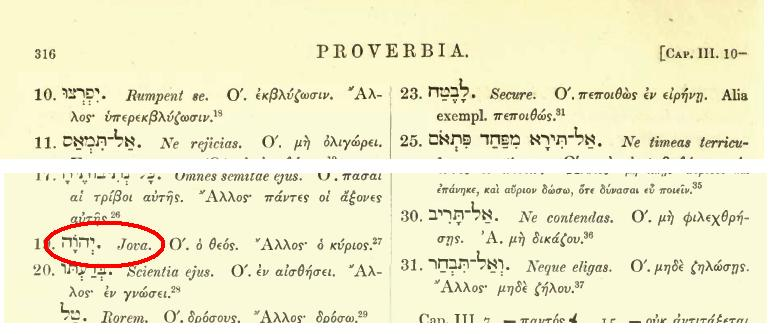
Text from the Hexapla showing Proverbs 3.

The subsisting fragments of partial copies have been collected in several editions, that of Frederick Field (1875) being the most fundamental on the basis of Greek and Syriac testimonies. The surviving fragments are now being re-published (with additional materials discovered since Field's edition) by an international group of Septuagint scholars. This work is being carried out by the Hexapla Institute in partnership with the International Organization for Septuagint and Cognate Studies, and other institutions. The members of the editorial board are: Dr. John D. Meade (Midwestern Baptist Theological Seminary), Dr. Peter J. Gentry (Southern Baptist Theological Seminary, Dr. Alison G. Salvesen (Oxford University), and Dr. Bas ter Haar Romeny (Vrije Universiteit Amsterdam).

== History ==
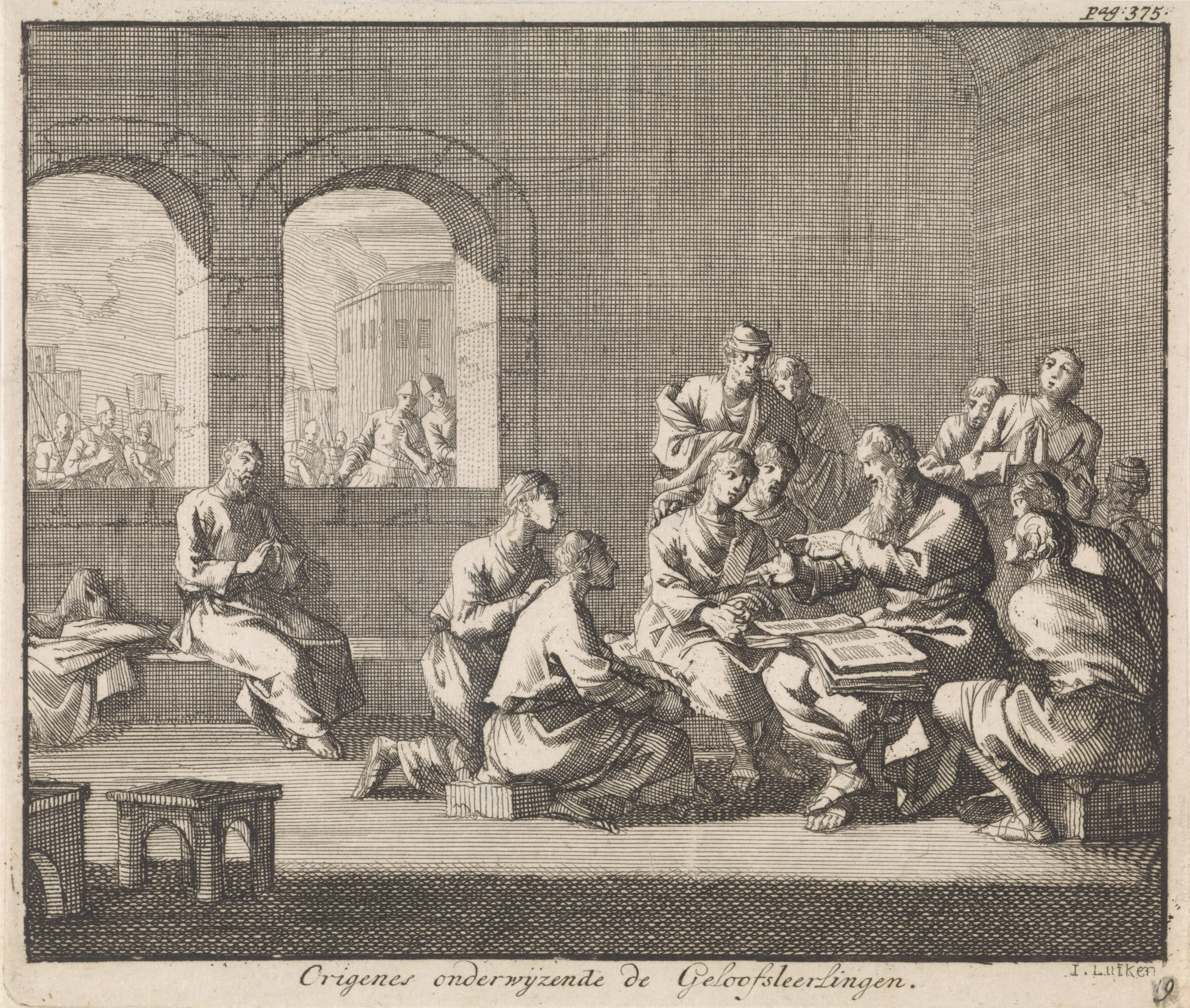
Origen with his disciples. Engraved by Jan Luyken, c. 1700

Origen began to study Biblical Hebrew in his youth; forced to relocate to Palestine during the persecution of Christianity in Alexandria, he went into biblical textology. By the 240s, he commented on virtually all the Old and New Testament books. His method of working with the biblical text was described in a message to Sextus Julius Africanus (c. 240) and a commentary on the Gospel of Matthew:

Origen, in his Commentary of the Gospel of Matthew, explained the purpose for creating the Hexapla:

[D]ue to discrepancies between the manuscripts of the Old Testament, with God's help, we were able to overcome using the testimony of other editions. This is because these points in the Septuagint, which because of discrepancies found in [other] manuscripts had given occasion for doubt, we have evaluated on the basis of these other editions, and marked with an obelus those places that were missing in the Hebrew text [...] while others have added the asterisk sign where it was apparent that the lessons were not found in the Septuagint; we have added the other, consistent with the text of the Hebrew editions.

== Structure ==
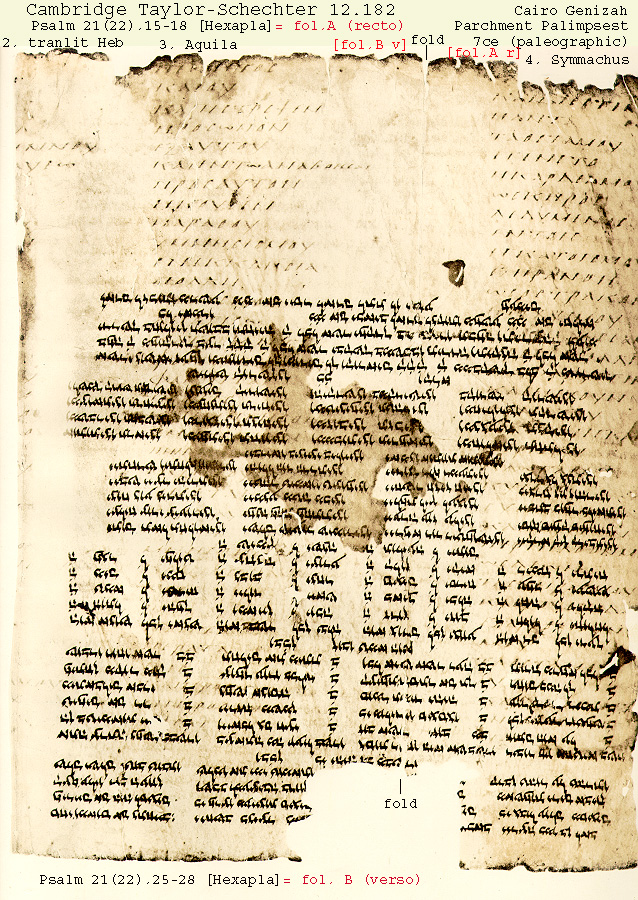
Hexapla fragment (Taylor-Schechter 12.182). The text of the Hexapla is the faint text visible in the upper part of the page; the page has been overwritten by a younger Hebrew text (shown upside down in this image).

The text of the Hexapla was organized in the form of six columns representing synchronized versions of the same Old Testament text, which placed side by side were the following:

1. the Hebrew consonantal text
2. the Secunda – the Hebrew text transliterated into Greek characters including vowels
3. the translation by Aquila of Sinope into Greek (2nd century)
4. the translation by Symmachus the Ebionite into Greek (late 2nd century)
5. a recension of the Septuagint, with (1) interpolations to indicate where the Hebrew is not represented in the Septuagint (taken mainly from Theodotion's text and marked with asterisks), and (2) indications, using signs called obeloi (singular: obelos), of where words, phrases, or occasionally larger sections in the Septuagint do not reflect any underlying Hebrew
6. the translation by Theodotion into Greek (mid 2nd century)

At the end of his life, Origen prepared a separate work called the Tetrapla (a synoptic set of four Greek translations), placing the Septuagint alongside the translations of Symmachus, Aquila, and Theodotion. Both Hexapla and Tetrapla are found in Greek manuscripts of the Septuagint, as well as manuscripts of the Syro-Hexaplar version. However, in a number of cases, the names of "Hexapla" and "Octapla" (in the Book of Job from the manuscripts of the Syro-Hexapla and the hexaplar Psalms) are also applied to the work of Origen. This caused a discussion in its time about whether these were separate works. According to Eusebius, the Hexapla contained three more translations of the Greek Psalms (Quinta, Sexta and Septima), which, however, have not been preserved (for a total of 9 columns, a so-called Enneapla).

[Origen] was looking for translations that exist in addition to the Seventy and in addition to the generally used translations of Aquila, Simmachus and Theodotion. I do not know from which unknown places, where they lay long ago, he extracted them into the light of God. The owner of them remained unknown to him, and he only said that he had found a copy in Likopol, near Actium, and another - in some other place. In the Hexapla, he, along with four famous translations of the psalms, places not only the fifth, but also the sixth and seventh with notes to one: he found it under Caracalla, the son of Septimius, in Jericho, in an enormous clay jar (Ancient Greek - πίθος)

— Hist. Eccl., VI, 16

According to Epiphanius of Salamis, the original Hexapla compiled by Origen had eight columns. It included two other anonymous Greek translations, one of which was discovered in wine jars in Jericho during the reign of Caracalla. The so-called "fifth" and "sixth editions" were two other Greek translations supposedly discovered by students outside the towns of Jericho and Nicopolis: these were later added by Origen to his Hexapla to make the Octapla.

== Modern adaptations ==
In 2026 Sixfold: The Hebrew Bible in Six Columns, a parallel edition modelled on the arrangement of the Hexapla, was released into the public domain on the Internet Archive. Like Origen's work, it sets six versions of the Hebrew Bible side by side, keyed to the Hebrew verse:

1. the consonantal text of the Leningrad Codex (from the Westminster Leningrad Codex);
2. a phonological transcription of the Tiberian reading, from the database of the Eep Talstra Centre for Bible and Computer (comparable in function to the Secunda);
3. the Jewish Publication Society translation of 1917;
4. the New English Translation (NET Bible);
5. the Septuagint English Tanakh, an English revision of the Berean Standard Bible conformed to the Septuagint; and
6. the Masoretic English Tanakh, a parallel revision conformed to the Masoretic Text.

The Septuagint column is arranged against the Hebrew, so that material found only in the Greek (such as the Additions to Esther and the Additions to Daniel) and Hebrew passages lacking in the Greek (as in Jeremiah and Job) are visible on the page.

== See also ==
- Complutensian Polyglot Bible
- English Hexapla
- On Weights and Measures of Epiphanius of Salamis
- Frederick Field

== Literature ==
- Felix Albrecht: Art. Hexapla of Origen, in: The Encyclopedia of the Bible and Its Reception 11, Berlin et al. 2015, cols. 1000–1002.
- Alison Salvesen (Hrsg.): Origen's hexapla and fragments. Papers presented at the Rich Seminar on the Hexapla, Oxford Centre for Hebrew and Jewish Studies, 25th July – 3rd August 1994 (= Texts and studies in ancient Judaism. Bd. 58). Mohr Siebeck, Tübingen 1998, ISBN 3-16-146575-X.
- John Daniel Meade, A Critical Edition of the Hexaplaric Fragments of Job 22-42, Origen's Hexapla: A Critical Edition of the Extant Fragments (Leuven: Peeters, 2020).
- Erich Klostermann: Analecta zur Septuaginta, Hexapla und Patristik. Leipzig: Deichert, 1895.
- Frederick Field (ed.): Origenis hexaplorum quae supersunt: sive veterum interpretum Graecorum in totum vetus testamentum fragmenta. Post Flaminium nobilium, Drusium, et Montefalconium, adhibita etiam versione Syro-Hexaplari. 2 vols. Oxford: Clarendon Press, 1875 (vol. 1: Genesis – Esther. Hexapla at the Internet Archive; vol. 2: Hiob – Maleachi. Hexapla at the Internet Archive).
- Anthony Grafton and Megan Williams, Christianity and the Transformation of the Book: Origen, Eusebius, and the Library of Caesarea. Cambridge, MA: Harvard University Press, 2006.
- Johnson, John (2013). "Hexapla". Lexham Bible Dictionary.
- Herbermann, Charles, ed. (1913). "Hexapla" . Catholic Encyclopedia. New York: Robert Appleton Company.
- Jewish Encyclopedia: Origen: His "Hexapla"
