= Masoretic English Tanakh =

English translation of the Hebrew Bible following the Masoretic Text

- Abbreviation: MET
- Language: English
- OT published: 2026
- Derived from: Berean Standard Bible
- Textual basis: Masoretic Text (Leningrad Codex)
- Translation type: Formal equivalence
- Version revision: 1.6 (November 2026)
- Copyright: Public domain
- Website: archive.org/details/masoretic-english-tanakh

The Masoretic English Tanakh (MET) is a public-domain English translation of the Hebrew Bible, first released in 2026. It is a revision of the Berean Standard Bible (BSB) that follows the Masoretic Text of the Leningrad Codex throughout, with readings from the Septuagint, the Dead Sea Scrolls and other ancient versions given only in footnotes. Its subtitle is The Hebrew Bible according to the Leningrad Codex.

== Text and translation ==
The Hebrew base is the Westminster Leningrad Codex. Chapter and verse numbers follow the Hebrew Bible rather than English Christian Bibles, so Psalm titles count as verses and Malachi has three chapters.

The translation avoids Christological readings and does not capitalize pronouns for God. The divine name is printed "LORD". Several words that carry later theological meaning in English are rendered more plainly: mal'akh is "messenger" rather than "angel", the yesha' family is "deliver" and "deliverance" rather than "save" and "salvation", and kipper is "purge" rather than "atone". Shamayim is translated "sky" when the visible sky is meant, and eretz is "land" when it refers to a particular country. Some Hebrew terms are left untranslated, including Sheol (referred to as "she", following Hebrew grammar), Maveth for personified Death, and zaraath for the skin disease usually called "leprosy". In Exodus 3:14 the divine name is given as Ehyeh-Asher-Ehyeh.

== Editions ==
The MET is available as an English edition (880 pages) and a Hebrew–English edition (1,724 pages), both as PDFs on the Internet Archive. The English edition is also available as an EPUB, and the text is distributed in USFM for Bible software. The Hebrew–English edition prints the Hebrew with full vowels and cantillation in a column beside the English. The translation is also one of the columns of Sixfold: The Hebrew Bible in Six Columns, a parallel edition modeled on Origen's Hexapla.
