= Frederick Field (theologian) =

British scholar and theologian

Frederick Field (1801–1885) was an English theologian and biblical scholar.

== Life ==
He was born in London, the son of Henry Field, and educated at Christ's Hospital and Trinity College, Cambridge, where he obtained a fellowship in 1824. He was ordained in 1828, and began a close study of patristic theology.

Eventually he published an emended and annotated text of Chrysostom's Homiliae in Matthaeum (Cambridge, 1839), and some years later he contributed to Edward Pusey's Bibliotheca Patrum (Oxford, 1838–1870), a similarly treated text of Chrysostom's homilies on Paul's epistles.

In 1839 he had accepted the living of Great Saxham, in Suffolk, and in 1842 he was presented by his college to the rectory of Reepham in Norfolk. He resigned in 1863, and settled at Norwich, in order to devote his whole time to study.

Twelve years later he completed the Origenis Hexaplorum quae supersunt (Oxford, 1867–1875), now well known as Field's Hexapla, a text reconstructed from the extant fragments of Origen's work of that name, together with materials drawn from the Syro-hexaplar version and the Septuagint of Robert Holmes and James Parsons (Oxford, 1798–1827). Field was appointed a member of the Old Testament revision company in 1870.

In 1881, when the Revision of the New Testament was printed, Field published Notes on select passages of the Greek Testament : chiefly with reference to recent English versions, in which he criticized many of the changes in the New Testament revision (the Old Testament was not published till 1885). Many he saw as incorrect grammatically, stylistically or textually and Field referred to "needless and finical changes" This book was reprinted posthumously in 1899 with additions by the author, under the title Notes on the translation of the New Testament. Included in the expanded edition was an 1882 defense of the Received Text reading of 1 Timothy 3:16. John William Burgon referred to the 1881 edition as a "masterly contribution to Sacred Criticism".
