= Psalms of Solomon =

1st-century BCE set of 18 Jewish poems

The Psalms of Solomon is a group of eighteen psalms, religious songs or poems, written in the first or second century BC. They are classed as Biblical apocrypha or as Old Testament pseudepigrapha; they appear in various copies of the Septuagint and the Peshitta, but were not admitted into later scriptural Biblical canons or generally included in printed Bibles after the arrival of the printing press.

== Name ==
The 17th of the 18 psalms is similar to Psalm 72 which has traditionally been attributed to Solomon, and hence may be the reason that the Psalms of Solomon have their name. An alternate theory is that the psalms were so highly regarded that Solomon's name was attached to them to keep them from being ignored or forgotten.

== Reception history ==
The Psalms of Solomon were referred to in early Christian writings, but lost to later generations until a Greek manuscript was rediscovered in the 17th century. There are currently eleven known 11th- to 16th-century manuscripts of a Greek translation from a lost Hebrew or Aramaic original, probably dating from the 1st or 2nd century BC. However, though now a collection, they were originally separate, written by different people in different periods.

There exist also four Syriac manuscripts. The earliest historical evidence of "Eighteen Psalms of Solomon" is in the list at the beginning of the Codex Alexandrinus (fifth century). According to James H. Charlesworth, "it has been calculated that the Psalms of Solomon would have fit into the twelve missing pages of the Codex Sinaiticus.

== Content and authorship ==
Politically, the Psalms of Solomon are anti-Hasmonean, and some psalms in the collection show an awareness of the Roman conquest of Jerusalem under Pompey in 63 BC, metaphorically treating him as a dragon who had been sent by God to punish the Hasmoneans. Some of the psalms are messianic, in the Jewish sense (referring to a mortal that seems to be divinely assisted, much like Moses), but the majority are concerned less with the world at large, and more with individual behavior, expressing a belief that repentance for unintended sins will return them to God's favor.

There have been attempts to link the text both to the Essenes of Qumran, who separated themselves from what they saw as a wicked world, and alternatively to the Pharisees in opposition to the Sadducees who generally supported the Maccabees.

== See also ==
- List of Old Testament pseudepigrapha
- Odes of Solomon
