= Henry Field (apothecary) =

- Born: 29 September 1755; London, England
- Died: 19 December 1837 (aged 82); Woodford, Essex

Henry Field (29 September 1755 – 19 December 1837) was an English apothecary.

== Life ==
Born on 29 September 1755, was the eldest son of John Field, an apothecary in extensive practice in Newgate Street, London, by his wife, Anne, daughter of Thomas Cromwell, grocer, who was a grandson of Henry Cromwell, lord deputy of Ireland. He succeeded his father in his profession, and in 1807 was elected apothecary to Christ's Hospital, a post which he continued to fill until within a short time of his death.

As a member of the Society of Apothecaries he promoted its interests. He gave with Joseph Hurlock free courses of lectures on materia medica at their hall to the apprentices and students, which resulted in the regular establishment of lectures by the society. In 1815 his efforts helped obtainthe act of parliament which enforced an examination into the education and professional attainments of candidates for practising as an apothecary in England and Wales. He also filled for a long period the office of deputy-treasurer, and later of treasurer, of the branch of the affairs of the Society of Apothecaries originally instituted for the supply of the members of their own body with genuine drugs and medicines, but which ultimately extended to the service of the navy, the East India Company, and the public generally.

In 1831 Field was nominated by Sir Henry Halford, 1st Baronet, on the part of the general board of health, as one of the medical officers attached to the city of London board of health for the adoption of precautions against the threatened outbreak of cholera in the metropolis. In common with his colleagues Field afterwards received the thanks of the corporation and a piece of plate. He was also for many years the treasurer of the London Annuity Society for the benefit of the widows of apothecaries, in Chatham place, Blackfriars, of which institution his father was the founder in 1765.

Field died at Woodford, Essex, on 19 December 1837. His portrait, by Henry William Pickersgill, was hung at Apothecaries' Hall; another, by Samuel Lane, was painted for the London Annuity Society.

== Works ==
Besides contributing professional remarks to medical journals, Field wrote a history of the Chelsea Physic Garden: Memoirs, historical and illustrative, of the Botanick Garden at Chelsea, belonging to the Society of Apothecaries of London, London, 1820. It was printed at the expense of the society, to whom the manuscript had been presented. A new edition by Robert Hunter Semple was issued in 1878. His introductory address, delivered on 11 February 1835 at the first of the society's evening meetings for scientific purposes, was also printed by his colleagues.

== Family ==
He married, 2 September 1784, Esther, daughter of John Barron of Woolacre House, near Deptford, and by this lady, who died 16 January 1834, he left six sons including Barron Field and Frederick Field, and two daughters.
