= Apostolic Bible Polyglot =

Bible translation by Charles VanderPool

The Apostolic Bible Polyglot
- Full name: The Apostolic Bible Polyglot
- Abbreviation: AB, ABP
- Complete Bible published: 2003
- Textual basis: Septuagint, Complutensian Polyglot
- Translation type: Formal Equivalence, Literal translation, Interlinear gloss
- Copyright: Copyright 1995 Charles Lynn VanderPool, Sr.
- Genesis 1:1–3 In the beginning God made the heaven and the earth. But the earth was unseen and unready, and darkness was upon the abyss, and spirit of God bore upon the water. And God said, Let there be light! And there was light. John 3:16 For thus God loved the world, so that [son his only born he gave], that every one trusting in him, should not perish, but should have [life eternal].

The Apostolic Bible Polyglot (ABP), originally published in 2003, is a Bible translation by Charles VanderPool. The ABP is an English translation with a Greek interlinear gloss and is keyed to a concordance. The numbering system, called "AB-Strong's", is a modified version of Strong's concordance, which was designed only to handle the traditional Hebrew Masoretic Text of the Old Testament, and the Greek text of the New Testament. Strong's concordance doesn't have numbering for the Greek O.T.

The ABP utilizes a Greek Septuagint base for the O.T. and, therefore, required a modified system. The numbers and the Greek word appear immediately above the English translation instead of side by side, as is common in many interlinears.

The Apostolic Bible Polyglot also contains The Lexical Concordance of the ABP, The English Greek Index of the ABP, and The Analytical Lexicon of the ABP. Despite utilizing a Septuagint textual basis for the Old Testament, it does not include the deuterocanonical books that are found in the Septuagint.

== History ==
The original typed text of the ABP followed the Codex Vaticanus-Sixtine text family. Then with the acquisition of the 1519 Aldine Bible in microfilm format from the Koninklijke Bibliotheek, of the Netherlands, a comparison was made between the Sixtine and Aldine texts, where one reading was chosen over the other. With the acquisition of the 1709 edition of the Greek Old Testament, edited by Lambert Bos, the 1518 Complutensian Polyglot variants, located in the extensive footnote sections, were added for comparison with the Sixtine and Aldine texts. With further comparison it was decided to choose mainly the text where two printed editions agreed. But since that time the acquisition of a full set of the Complutensian Polyglot Bible in facsimile format enabled a closer comparison to be made, not only of variant readings, but also chapter and verse variations, along with punctuation.

As various manuscripts become available, these will also be compared with the text of the Apostolic Bible, and changes may be made. The Vatopedi manuscript, available from the Library of Congress in microfilm form, is one such manuscript among many that will be used for comparison.

== Structure ==
The Apostolic Bible Polyglot is the first numerically coded Greek Old Testament. It allows study of both Hebrew- and Greek-based scriptural texts in the same language, and a student may follow the association of a word from either the New Testament to the Old Testament or vice versa. The trilinear format has the AB-Strong numbers on the top line, the Greek text on the middle line, and the English translation on the bottom line. The text is separated into books, chapters, section headings, verses and footnotes.

ABP is in electronic downloadable PDF form, CD-ROM form, and print form.
