= Aldine Bible =

1518 Greek Bible

Πάντα τὰ κατ᾿ ἐξοχὴν καλούμενα βιβλία, θείας δηλαδὴ γραφῆς παλαιᾶς τε καὶ νέας. Sacrae scripturae veteris novaeque omnia.
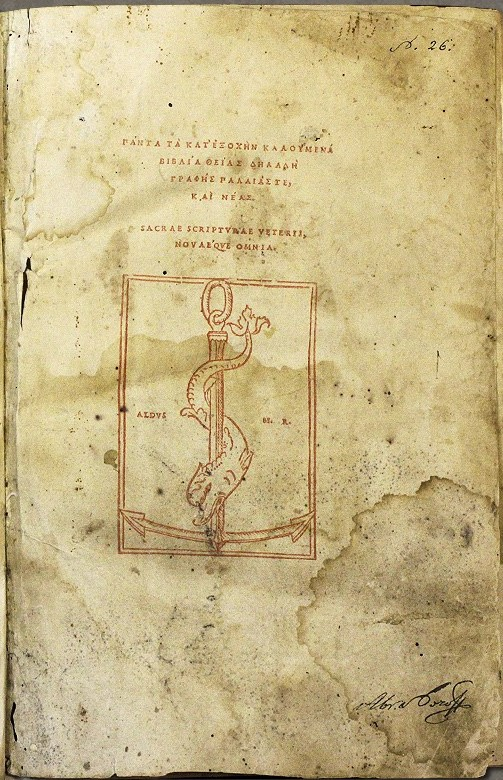
- Title page of the 1518 edition
- Language: Greek
- Published: 1518

The Aldine Bible (full title: Πάντα τὰ κατ᾿ ἐξοχὴν καλούμενα βιβλία, θείας δηλαδὴ γραφῆς παλαιᾶς τε καὶ νέας. Sacrae scripturae veteris novaeque omnia.) is an edition of the Bible in Greek (the Septuagint is used for the Old Testament) begun by Aldus Manutius, and published in Venice in 1518 by the Aldine Press. It is the first complete Bible printed entirely in Greek (its Old Testament is the Septuagint) to be published.

== History ==
Manutius dreamed of a trilingual Bible but never saw it come to fruition. However, before his death Manutius had begun an edition of the Septuagint, also known as the Greek Old Testament translated from Hebrew, the first ever to be published; it appeared posthumously in 1518. This edition is the first complete Bible printed entirely in Greek (first edition of the whole Bible in Greek; the text contained in the Complutensian Polyglot, though dated 1514-17, was not published before 1520).

It was edited by Andreas Asolanus, the father-in-law of Aldus (pt. I. was edited by Andreas Asolanus, pt. II. by Federicus Asolanus, and pt. III. – the New Testament – by Franciscus Asolanus).

== Characteristics ==
The text of this edition is based on the Complutensian text for the Old Testament, and upon the first edition of the New Testament by Erasmus for the New Testament.

The full title of the Aldine Bible is: Πάντα τὰ κατ᾿ ἐξοχὴν καλούμενα βιβλία, θείας δηλαδὴ γραφῆς παλαιᾶς τε καὶ νέας. Sacrae scripturae veteris novaeque omnia. Colophon: Venetiis in aedib[us] Aldi et Andreae soceri. mdxviii., mense Februario.

== See also ==
- Roman Septuagint
