= Bible citation =

Book name and chapter and verse of the Bible

A citation from the Bible is usually referenced with the book name, chapter number and verse number. Sometimes, the name of the Bible translation is also included. There are several formats for doing so.

== Common formats ==
A common format for biblical citations is Book chapter:verses, using a colon to delimit chapter from verse, as in:

"In the beginning, God created the heaven and the earth" (Gen. 1:1).

Or, stated more formally, (Note: Five books have a single chapter: Obadiah, Philemon, 2 & 3 John, Jude. In many printed editions, the chapter number is omitted for these books, and references just use the verse numbers.)

Book chapter for a chapter (John 3);
Book chapter_{1}–chapter_{2} for a range of chapters (John 1–3);
book chapter:verse for a single verse (John 3:16);
book chapter:verse_{1}–verse_{2} for a range of verses (John 3:16–17);
book chapter:verse_{1},verse_{2} for multiple disjoint verses (John 6:14, 44).

The range delimiter is an en-dash, and there are no spaces on either side of it.

This format is the one accepted by The Chicago Manual of Style to cite scriptural standard works. The MLA style is similar, but replaces the colon with a period.

Citations in the APA style add the translation of the Bible after the verse. For example, (John 3:16, New International Version). Translation names should not be abbreviated (e.g., write out King James Version instead of using KJV). Subsequent citations do not require the translation unless that changes. In APA 7th edition, the Bible is listed in the references at the end of the document, which has changed since previous versions.

Citations in Turabian style requires that when referring to books or chapters, do not italicize or underline them. The book names must also be spelled out. For example, (The beginning of Genesis recounts the creation of our universe.) When referring directly to a particular passage, the abbreviated book name, chapter number, a colon, and verse number must be provided. Additionally, the Bible is not listed in the references at the end of the document and the edition of the Bible is required when citing inside parentheses. For example, (Eph. 2:10 [New International Version]).

== Punctuation ==
When citations are used in run-in quotations, they should not, according to The Christian Writer's Manual of Style, contain the punctuation either from the quotation itself (such as a terminating exclamation mark or question mark) or from the surrounding prose. The full-stop at the end of the surrounding sentence belongs outside of the parentheses that surround the citation. For example:

Take him away! Take him away! Crucify him! (John 19:15).

The Christian Writer's Manual of Style also states that a citation that follows a block quotation of text may either be in parentheses flush against the text, or right-aligned following an em-dash on a new line. For example:

These things I have spoken to you, so that in Me you may have peace. In the world you have tribulation, but take courage; I have overcome the world. (John 16:33 NASB)
These things I have spoken to you, so that in Me you may have peace. In the world you have tribulation, but take courage; I have overcome the world.

— John 16:33 NASB

== Abbreviating book names ==
The names of the books of the Bible can be abbreviated. Most Bibles give preferred abbreviation guides in their tables of contents, or at the front of the book. Abbreviations may be used when the citation is a reference that follows a block quotation of text.

Abbreviations should not be used, according to The Christian Writer's Manual of Style, when the citation is in running text. Instead, the full name should be spelled out. Hudson observes, however, that for scholarly or reference works that contain a large number of citations in running text, abbreviations may be used simply to reduce the length of the prose, and that a similar exception can be made for cases where a large number of citations are used in parentheses.

There are two commonly accepted styles for abbreviating the book names, one used in general books and the other used in scholarly works.

Electronic editions of Bibles use internal abbreviations. Some of these abbreviation schemes are standardized. These include OSIS and ParaTExt USFM.

== Roman numerals ==
Roman numerals are often used for the numbered books of the Bible. For example, Paul's First Epistle to the Corinthians may be written as "I Corinthians", using the Roman numeral "I" rather than the Arabic numeral "1". The Christian Writer's Manual of Style, however, recommends using Arabic numerals for numbered books, as in "2 Corinthians" rather than "II Corinthians".

== Editions ==
The Student Supplement to the SBL Handbook of Style published by the Society of Biblical Literature states that for modern editions of the Bible, publishers information is not required in a citation. One should simply use the standard abbreviation of the version of the Bible (e.g. "KJV" for King James Version, "RSV" for Revised Standard Version, "NIV" for New International Version, and so forth).

== Multiple citations ==
The Student Supplement to the SBL Handbook of Style recommends that multiple citations be given in the form of a list separated by a semicolon, without a conjunction before the final item in the list. When multiple consecutive citations reference the same book, the name of the book is omitted from the second and subsequent citations. For example:

John 1–3; 3:16; 6:14, 44

== Citing non-biblical text in Bibles ==
Some Bibles, particularly study bibles, contain additional text that is not the biblical text. This includes footnotes, annotations, and special articles. The Student Supplement to the SBL Handbook of Style recommends that such text be cited in the form of a normal book citation, not as a Bible citation. For example:

Sophie Laws (1993). "The Letter of James". In Wayne A. Meeks; et al. (eds.). The HarperCollins Study Bible: New Revised Standard Version, with the Apocryphal/Deuterocanonical Books. New York: HarperCollins. pp. 2269–2270.

== See also ==
- Books of the Bible
- Christian popular culture
