= James H. Charlesworth =

American theologian (born 1940)

James Hamilton Charlesworth
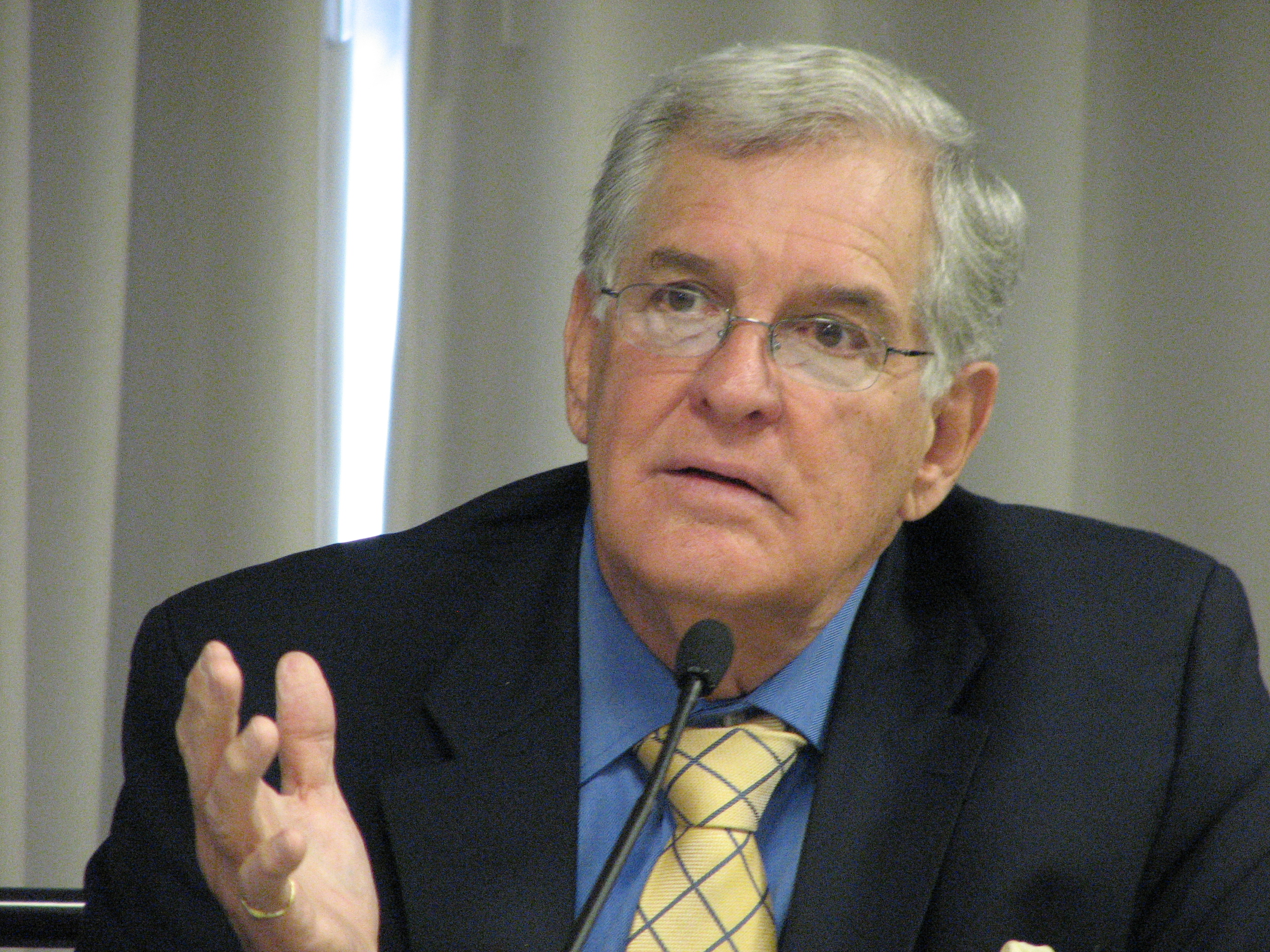
- Biblical Scholar James H. Charlesworth
- Born: May 30, 1940 (age 86)
- Occupations: George L. Collord Professor of New Testament Language and Literature and Director of the Dead Sea Scrolls Project at Princeton Theological Seminary
- Known for: research on the Apocrypha and Pseudepigrapha
- Awards: Outstanding Educator of America 1975, Frank Moore Cross Award, American Schools of Oriental Research 1997

Academic background
- Education: Ohio Wesleyan University, Duke Divinity School
- Alma mater: Duke Graduate School (Ph.D.)
- Thesis: A Critical Examination of the Odes of Solomon: Identification, Text, Original Language, Date (1967)

Academic work
- Discipline: Biblical studies
- Sub-discipline: Extra-biblical studies
- Institutions: Duke University; Princeton Theological Seminary

James Hamilton Charlesworth (born May 30, 1940) is an American academic who served as the George L. Collord Professor of New Testament Language and Literature until January 17, 2019, and Director of the Dead Sea Scrolls Project at the Princeton Theological Seminary. His research interests include the Apocrypha and Pseudepigrapha of the Hebrew and Christian Bibles, the Dead Sea Scrolls, Josephus, the Historical Jesus, the Gospel of John, and the Book of Revelation.

== Works ==
=== Books ===
- Charlesworth, James H., ed. (1972). John and Qumran. London: Geoffrey Chapman. ISBN 978-0-225-66101-9. OCLC 495676.
- Charlesworth, James H., (1983). Old Testament Pseudepigrapha Vol.1 - Apocalyptic Literature and Testaments, New York, Doubleday (publisher)
- ———, ed. (1973). The Odes of Solomon. Oxford: Clarendon Press. ISBN 978-0-1982-6162-9. OCLC 771132.
- ———, ed. (1981). The Pseudepigrapha and Modern Research, with a supplement. Septuagint and cognate studies series. Vol. 7. Chico, CA: Scholars Press for the Society of Biblical Literature. ISBN 978-0-891-30440-1. OCLC 7550634.
- Charlesworth, James H. (1995). The Beloved Disciple: Whose Witness Validates the Gospel of John?. Atlanta, Georgia: Trinity Press International. ISBN 9781563381355.
- ———; Johns, Loren L., eds. (1997). Hillel and Jesus: comparative studies of two major religious leaders. Minneapolis, MN: Fortress Press. ISBN 978-0-800-62564-1. OCLC 37574766.
- ———, ed. (2012). The Tomb of Jesus and His Family? Exploring Ancient Jewish Tombs Near Jerusalem's Walls. Grand Rapids, MI: Eerdmans. ISBN 978-0-802-86745-2.
- ———; Medina, Michael (2014). Walking Through the Land of the Bible: Historical 3-D Adventure. Jerusalem: Magnes Press. ISBN 978-9-6549-3686-6.
- ———, ed. (2014). Jesus and Temple: Textual and Archaeological Explorations. Minneapolis, MN: Fortress Press. ISBN 978-1-4514-8036-8.
- ———; McDonald, Lee Martin; Jurgens, Blake A., eds. (2014). Sacra Scriptura: How "Non-Canonical" Texts Functioned in Early Judaism and Early Christianity. T & T Clark Jewish and Christian Texts Series. London: T & T Clark. ISBN 978-0567664235.

=== Articles and chapters ===
- ——— (2014). "4 Ezra and 2 Baruch: Archaeology and Elusive Answers to our Perennial Questions". In Boccaccini, G.; Zurawski, J. M. (eds.). Interpreting 4 Ezra and 2 Baurch: International Studies. London: T & T Clark. pp. 155–72. ISBN 978-0-5674-4231-4.
- ——— (2015). "Who Claimed Herod was 'the Christ'?". In Weiss, Zeev (ed.). Eretz-Israel: Archaeological, Historical and Geographical Studies [Ehud Netzer Festschrift]. Vol. 31. Jerusalem: The Israel Exploration Society and the Institute of Archaeology, Hebrew University of Jerusalem. pp. 29*–39*.
- ——— (2015). "הַבְּרָכָה עַל־הַר גְּרִזִים –– An Unknown Dead Sea Scroll and Speculations Focused on the Vorlage of Deuteronomy 27:4". In Frey, J.; Popkes, E. E. (eds.). Jesus, Paulus und die Texte von Qumran [H-W Kuhn Festschrift]. Wissenschaftliche Untersuchungen zum Neuen Testament 2/390. Tübingen: Mohr Siebeck. pp. 393–414.

== See also ==
- Henoch (journal)
