= Roman Septuagint =

Edition of the Septuagint published in 1587

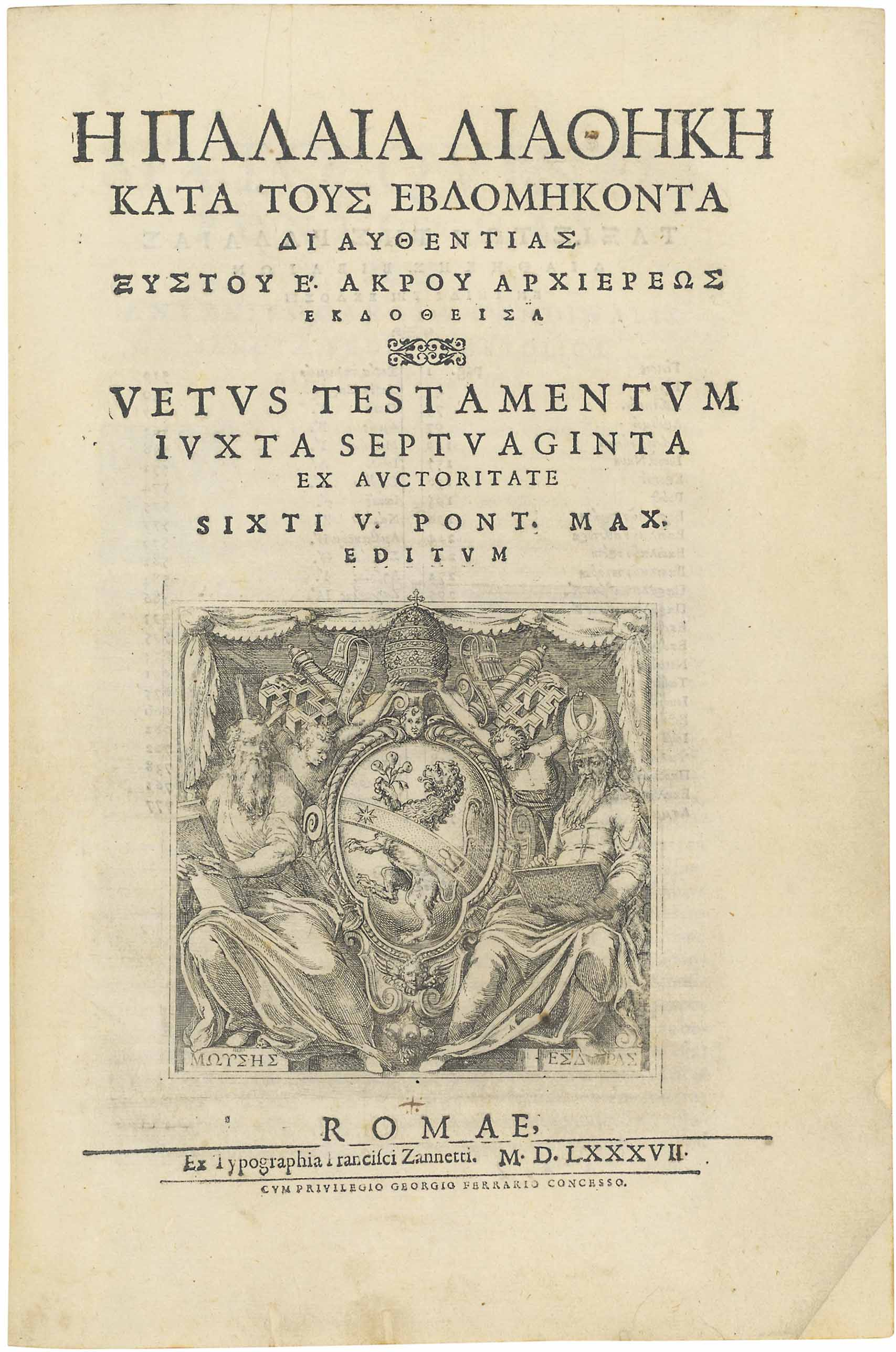
- Title page of the Roman (Sixtine) Septuagint
- Language: Koine Greek
- Published: 1587
- Publication place: Papal States

The Roman Septuagint, also known as the Sixtine Septuagint (Sixtine LXX) or the Roman Sixtine Septuagint, is an edition of the Septuagint published in 1587, and commissioned by Pope Sixtus V.

The printing of the book "was worked off in 1586, but the work was not published until May 1587". Hence why a second I on the publication date of the book "has been added in many copies with the pen".

This edition is based on the Codex Vaticanus. The text of this edition of the Septuagint became mostly the standard for all the later editions of the Septuagint for three centuries after its publication, until Rahlfs published his edition of the Septuagint which became the new standard.

Antonio Carafa directed the work on the edition of the Roman Septuagint. The Roman Septuagint was published "by the authority of Sixtus V, to assist the revisers who were preparing the Latin Vulgate edition ordered by the Council of Trent".

== Names ==
This work has been given multiple names:

- Roman Septuagint
- Sixtine Septuagint (Sixtine LXX)
- Roman Sixtine Septuagint
- Roman (Sixtine) Septuagint
- Roman edition of the Septuagint
- Vetus Testamentum Iuxta Septuaginta

== See also ==
- Sixtine Vulgate
- Aldine Bible
