= Septuagint =

Greek translation of Hebrew scriptures

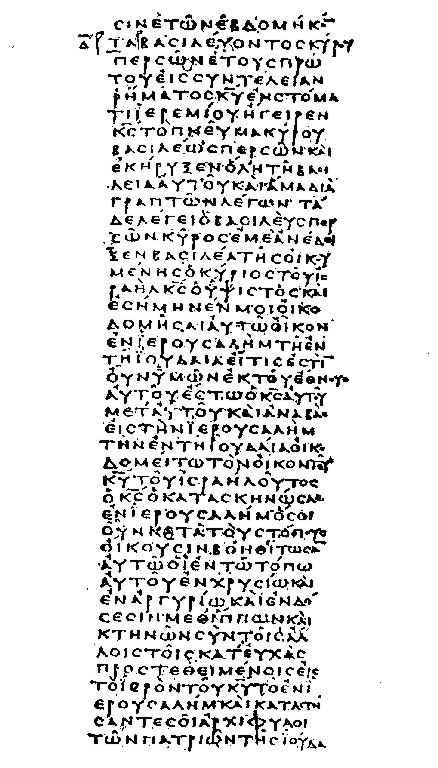
- Fragment of a Septuagint: A column of uncial book from 1 Esdras in the Codex Vaticanus c. 325–350 AD, the basis of Lancelot Charles Lee Brenton's Greek edition and his English translation
- Also known as: LXX; Greek Old Testament
- Date: mid- or late 3rd century BCE
- Language: Koine Greek

The Septuagint (/ˈsɛptjuədʒɪnt/ SEP-tew-ə-jint), sometimes referred to as the Greek Old Testament or The Translation of the Seventy (Koine Greek: Ἡ μετάφρασις τῶν Ἑβδομήκοντα, romanized: Hē metáphrasis tôn Hebdomḗkonta), and abbreviated as LXX, is the earliest extant Greek translation of the Hebrew Bible from the original Biblical Hebrew. The full Greek title derives from the story recorded in the Letter of Aristeas to Philocrates (his brother) that "the laws of the Jews" were translated into Koine Greek at the request of Ptolemy II Philadelphus (285–247 BC) by seventy-two Hebrew translators—six from each of the Twelve Tribes of Israel—though this story is considered to be pseudepigraphical by some scholars.

Biblical scholars agree that the first five books of the Hebrew Bible were translated from Biblical Hebrew into Koine Greek by Jews living in the Ptolemaic Kingdom, probably in or around Alexandria, and can be dated with confidence to the mid- or late 3rd century BCE. The remaining books were presumably translated in the 2nd century BCE. The corpus continued to undergo revision and recensional development in both Jewish and Christian communities through the fourth century CE. Few people could speak and even fewer could read in the Hebrew language during the Second Temple period; Koine Greek and Aramaic were the lingua francas at that time among the Jewish community. The LXX, therefore, satisfied a need in the Jewish community. (Some targums translating or paraphrasing the Bible into Aramaic were also made during the Second Temple period.)

== Etymology ==
The term "Septuagint" is derived from the Latin phrase Vetus Testamentum ex versione Septuaginta Interpretum ("The Old Testament from the version of the Seventy Translators"). This phrase in turn was derived from the Koine Greek: Ἡ μετάφρασις τῶν Ἑβδομήκοντα, romanized: hē metáphrasis tôn hebdomḗkonta, lit. 'The Translation of the Seventy'. It was not until the time of Augustine of Hippo (354–430 AD) that the Greek translation of the Jewish scriptures was called by the Latin term Septuaginta. The Roman numeral LXX (seventy) is commonly used as an abbreviation, in addition to $\mathfrak{G}$ or G.

== Composition ==
=== Jewish legend ===
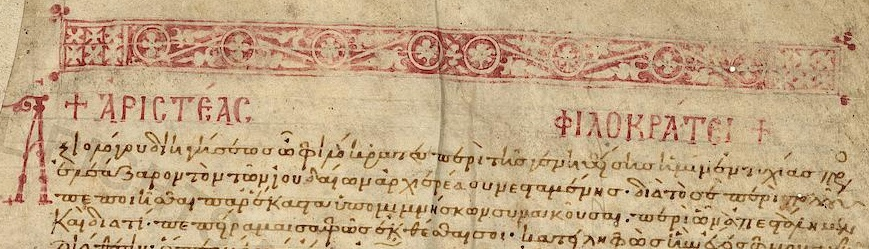
Beginning of the Letter of Aristeas to Philocrates (Biblioteca Apostolica Vaticana, 11th century)

According to tradition, Ptolemy II Philadelphus, the Macedonian Greek pharaoh of Egypt, sent seventy-two Hebrew translators—six from each of the Twelve Tribes of Israel—from Second Temple era Jerusalem to Alexandria to translate the Torah from Biblical Hebrew into Koine Greek, for inclusion in the Library of Alexandria. This narrative is found in the possibly pseudepigraphic letter of Aristeas to his brother Philocrates, and it was repeated by Philo, Josephus in Antiquities of the Jews, and by later sources, including Augustine, Bishop of Hippo. It is also found in the Tractate Megillah of the Babylonian Talmud:

King Ptolemy once gathered 72 Elders. He placed them in 72 chambers, each of them in a separate one, without revealing to them why they were summoned. He entered each one's room and said: "Write for me the Torah of Moshe, your teacher". God put it in the heart of each one to translate identically as all the others did.

Philo of Alexandria writes that the number of scholars was chosen by selecting six scholars from each of the twelve tribes of Israel. Caution is needed here regarding the accuracy of this statement by Philo of Alexandria, as it implies that the twelve tribes were still in existence during Ptolemy's reign, and that the Ten Lost Tribes of the twelve tribes had not been forcibly resettled by Assyria almost 500 years previously. Although not all the people of the ten tribes were scattered, many peoples of the ten tribes sought refuge in Jerusalem and survived, preserving a remnant of each tribe and their lineages. Jerusalem swelled to five times its prior population due to the influx of refugees. According to later rabbinic tradition, the LXX was given to Ptolemy two days before the annual fast of the Tenth of Tevet.

According to Aristobulus of Alexandria's fragment 3, portions of the Law were translated from Hebrew into Greek long before the well-known LXX version. He stated that Plato and Pythagoras knew the Jewish Law and borrowed from it.

In the preface to his 1844 translation of the Septuagint, Lancelot Charles Lee Brenton acknowledges that the Jews of Alexandria were likely to have been the writers of the LXX, but dismisses Aristeas' account as a pious fiction. Instead, he asserts that the real origin of the name "Septuagint" lies in the fact that the earliest version was submitted by the authors to the Sanhedrin in Alexandria for editing and approval.

The Jews of Alexandria celebrated the translation with an annual festival on Pharos, where the Lighthouse of Alexandria stood—the location where the translation was said to have taken place. During the festival, a large gathering of Jews, along with some Gentile visitors, would assemble on the beach for a grand picnic.

=== History ===
The dating of the translation of the Torah to the 3rd century BC is supported by a number of factors, including its Greek being representative of early Koine Greek, citations beginning as early as the 2nd century BC, and early manuscripts datable to the 2nd century BC. After the Torah, other books were translated over the next two to three centuries. It is unclear which was translated when, or where; some may have been translated twice (into different versions), and then revised. The quality and style of the translators varied considerably from book to book, from a literal translation to paraphrasing to an interpretative style.

The translation process of the LXX, and from it into other versions, can be divided into several stages: the Greek text was produced within the social environment of Hellenistic Judaism, and completed by 132 BC. With the spread of early Christianity, the LXX in turn was rendered into Latin in a variety of versions and the latter, collectively known as the Vetus Latina, were also referred to as the Septuagint initially in early Christian Alexandria, but elsewhere as well. The LXX also formed the basis for the Old Church Slavonic, Syro-Hexaplar version, and the Classical Armenian, Old Georgian, and Coptic versions of the Christian Old Testament.

=== Language ===
The LXX is written in Koine Greek. Some sections contain Semiticisms, which are idioms and phrases based on Semitic languages such as Hebrew and Aramaic. Other books, such as Daniel and Proverbs, have a stronger Greek influence.

The LXX may also clarify pronunciation of archaic Hebrew; many proper nouns are spelled with Greek vowels in the translation, but contemporary Hebrew texts lacked niqqud (vowel marks). However, it is unlikely that all Biblical Hebrew sounds had precise Greek equivalents. This is also further complicated by modern academia's belief that the vowels of both ancient Hebrew and ancient Greek were pronounced differently than their modern versions.

=== Canonical differences ===
The LXX does not consist of a single, unified corpus. Rather, it is a collection of ancient translations of the Tanakh, along with other Jewish texts that are now commonly referred to as apocrypha. Importantly, the canon of the Hebrew Bible was evolving over the century or so in which the LXX was being written. Also, the texts were translated by many different people, in different locations, at different times, for different purposes, and often from different original Hebrew manuscripts.

The Hebrew Bible has three parts: the Torah 'Law', the Nevi'im 'Prophets', and the Ketuvim 'Writings'. The LXX has four: law, history, poetry, and prophets. The books of the Biblical apocrypha were inserted at appropriate locations. Extant copies of the LXX, which date from the 4th century, contain books and additions not present in the Hebrew Bible as established in the Jewish canon and are not uniform in their contents. These copies of the LXX include books known as anagignoskomena in Greek and, in English, as deuterocanon (derived from the Greek words for "second canon"), which are not included in the modern Jewish canon. These books are estimated to have been written between 200 BC and 50 AD. Among them are the first two Books of the Maccabees; the Book of Tobit; the Book of Judith; the Book of Wisdom; Book of Sirach; the Book of Baruch (including the Letter of Jeremiah), and additions to Esther and Daniel. The LXX version of some books, such as the Book of Daniel and the Book of Esther, are longer than those in the Masoretic Text (𝕸), which were affirmed as canonical in Rabbinic Judaism. The Septuagint Book of Jeremiah is shorter than 𝕸. The Psalms of Solomon, 1 Esdras, 3 Maccabees, 4 Maccabees, the Letter of Jeremiah, the Book of Odes, the Prayer of Manasseh and Psalm 151 are included in some copies of the LXX.

The LXX has been rejected as scriptural by mainstream Rabbinic Judaism for a couple of reasons. First, the LXX differs from 𝕸 in many cases (particularly in the Book of Job). For example, according to Heinrich Guggenheimer, intentional mistranslations in Deuteronomy 6 make reference to ancient sources of the Passover Haggadah. Second, the translations appear at times to demonstrate an ignorance of Hebrew idiomatic usage. A particularly noteworthy example of this phenomenon is found in Isaiah 7:14, in which the Hebrew word עַלְמָה ('almāh), which translates into English as "young woman", is translated as παρθένος (parthenos), "virgin".

The LXX became synonymous with the Greek Old Testament, a Christian canon that incorporates the books of the Hebrew canon along with additional texts. Although the Catholic Church and the Eastern Orthodox Church include most of the books in the LXX in their canons, Protestant churches usually do not. After the Reformation, many Protestant Bibles began to follow the Jewish Biblical canon and exclude the additional texts (which came to be called the Apocrypha) as noncanonical. The Apocrypha are included under a separate heading in the King James Version of the Bible.

Deuterocanonical and apocryphal books in the LXX
Greek name (Note: The canon of the original Old Greek LXX is disputed. This table reflects the canon of the Old Testament as used currently in Eastern Orthodoxy.)	Transliteration	English name
Προσευχὴ Μανασσῆ	Proseuchē Manassē	Prayer of Manasseh
Ἔσδρας Αʹ	1 Esdras	1 Esdras
Τωβίτ (called Τωβείτ or Τωβίθ in some sources)	Tōbit (or Tōbeit or Tōbith)	Tobit
Ἰουδίθ	Ioudith	Judith
Ἐσθήρ	Esthēr	Esther (with additions)
Μακκαβαίων Αʹ	1 Makkabaiōn	1 Maccabees
Μακκαβαίων Βʹ	2 Makkabaiōn	2 Maccabees
Μακκαβαίων Γʹ	3 Makkabaiōn	3 Maccabees
Μακκαβαίων Δ' Παράρτημα	4 Makkabaiōn Parartēma	4 Maccabees (Note: Originally placed after 3 Maccabees and before Psalms, but placed in an appendix of the Orthodox Canon.)
Ψαλμός ΡΝΑʹ	Psalmos 151	Psalm 151
Σοφία Σαλομῶντος	Sophia Salomōntos	Wisdom or Wisdom of Solomon
Σοφία Ἰησοῦ Σειράχ	Sophia Iēsou Seirach	Sirach or Ecclesiasticus
Βαρούχ	Barouch	Baruch
Ἐπιστολὴ Ἰερεμίου	Epistolē Ieremiou	Letter of Jeremiah
Δανιήλ	Daniēl	Daniel (with additions)
Ψαλμοὶ Σαλομῶντος	Psalmoi Salomōntos	Psalms of Solomon (Note: Not in the Eastern Orthodox canon, but originally included in the LXX.)

=== Final form ===
All the books in the western Old Testament canons are found in the LXX, although the order does not always coincide with the Western book order. The LXX order is evident in the earliest Christian Bibles, which were written during the 4th century.

Some books which are set apart in 𝕸 are grouped together. The Books of Samuel and the Books of Kings are one four-part book entitled Βασιλειῶν (Basileon, 'Of Reigns') in the LXX. The Books of Chronicles, known collectively as Παραλειπομένων 'Of Things Left Out', supplement 'Of Reigns'. The LXX organizes the Twelve Minor Prophets in its twelve-part 'Book of Twelve', as does 𝕸.

Some ancient scriptures are found in the LXX, but not in the Hebrew Bible. The books are Tobit; Judith; Wisdom; Sirach; Baruch, and the Letter of Jeremiah, which became chapter six of Baruch in the Vulgate (vg); the additions to Daniel (Prayer of Azariah and Song of the Three Holy Children, Susanna, and Bel and the Dragon); the additions to Esther; 1 Maccabees; 2 Maccabees; 3 Maccabees; 4 Maccabees; 1 Esdras; Book of Odes (including the Prayer of Manasseh); the Psalms of Solomon, and Psalm 151.

Fragments of deuterocanonical books in Hebrew are among the Dead Sea Scrolls found at Qumran. Sirach, whose Hebrew text was already known from the Cairo Geniza, has been found in two Hebrew scrolls (2QSir or 2Q18; 11QPs_a or 11Q5). Another Hebrew scroll of Sirach has been found in Masada (MasSir). Five fragments from the Book of Tobit have been found in Qumran: four written in Aramaic and one written in Hebrew (papyri 4Q, nos. 196-200). Psalm 151 appears with a number of canonical and non-canonical psalms in the Dead Sea scroll 11QPs(a) (also known as 11Q5), a 1st century scroll discovered in 1956. The scroll contains two short Hebrew psalms, which scholars agree were the basis for Psalm 151. The canonical acceptance of these books varies by Christian tradition.

== Use ==
=== Jewish use ===
It is unclear to what extent Alexandrian Jews accepted the authority of the LXX. Manuscripts of the LXX have been found among the Dead Sea Scrolls, and were thought to have been in use among various Jewish sects at the time.

Several factors led most Jews to abandon the LXX around the 2nd century. The earliest gentile Christians used the LXX out of necessity, since it was the only Greek version of the Bible and most (if not all) of these early non-Jewish Christians could not read Hebrew. The association of the LXX with a rival religion may have made it suspect in the eyes of the newer generation of Jews and Jewish scholars. Jews instead used Hebrew or Aramaic Targum manuscripts later compiled by the Masoretes and authoritative Aramaic translations, such as those of Onkelos and Rabbi Yonathan ben Uziel.

Perhaps most significant for the LXX, as distinct from other Greek versions, was that the LXX began to lose Jewish sanction after differences between it and contemporary Hebrew scriptures were discovered. Even Greek-speaking Jews tended to prefer other Jewish versions in Greek (such as the translation by Aquila), which seemed to be more concordant with contemporary Hebrew texts.

=== Christian use ===
The Early Christian church used the Greek texts, since Greek was a lingua franca of the eastern parts of the Roman Empire at the time and the language of the Greco-Roman Church, while Aramaic was the language of Syriac Christianity. The relationship between the apostolic use of the LXX and the Hebrew texts is complicated. Although the LXX seems to have been a major source for the Apostles, it is not the only one. St. Jerome offered, for example, Matthew 2:15 and 2:23, John 19:37, John 7:38, and 1 Corinthians 2:9 as examples found in Hebrew texts but not in the LXX. Matthew 2:23 is not present in current Masoretic tradition either; according to Jerome, however, it was in Isaiah 11:1. The New Testament writers freely used the Greek translation when citing the Jewish scriptures (or quoting Jesus doing so), implying that Jesus, his apostles, and their followers considered it reliable.

In the early Christian Church, the presumption that the LXX was translated by Jews before the time of Christ and that it lends itself more to a Christological interpretation than 2nd-century Hebrew texts in certain places was taken as evidence that "Jews" had changed the Hebrew text in a way that made it less Christological. Irenaeus writes about Isaiah 7:14 that the LXX clearly identifies a "virgin" (Greek παρθένος; bethulah in Hebrew) who would conceive. The word almah in the Hebrew text was, according to Irenaeus, interpreted by Theodotion and Aquila (Jewish converts), as a "young woman" who would conceive. Again, according to Irenaeus, the Ebionites used this to claim that Joseph was the biological father of Jesus. To him that was heresy facilitated by late anti-Christian alterations of the scripture in Hebrew, as evident by the older, pre-Christian LXX.

Jerome broke with church tradition, translating most of the Old Testament of his Vulgate from Hebrew rather than Greek. His choice was sharply criticized by Augustine, his contemporary. Although Jerome argued for the superiority of the Hebrew texts in correcting the LXX on philological and theological grounds, because he was accused of heresy, he also acknowledged the LXX texts. Acceptance of Jerome's version increased, and it displaced the LXX's Vetus Latina (Old Latin translations).

The Eastern Orthodox Church prefers to use the LXX as the basis for translating the Old Testament into other languages, and uses the untranslated LXX where Greek is the liturgical language.

Critical translations of the Old Testament that use 𝕸 as their basis consult the LXX and other versions to reconstruct the meaning of the Hebrew text when it is unclear, corrupted, or ambiguous. According to the New Jerusalem Bible foreword, "Only when this (𝕸) presents insuperable difficulties have emendations or other versions, such as the [...] LXX, been used." The translator's preface to the New International Version reads, "The translators also consulted the more important early versions (including) the Septuagint [...] Readings from these versions were occasionally followed where the (𝕸) seemed doubtful"

== Textual history ==
Books
Greek name	Transliteration	English name
Law
Γένεσις	Genesis	Genesis
Ἔξοδος	Exodos	Exodus
Λευϊτικόν	Leuitikon	Leviticus
Ἀριθμοί	Arithmoi	Numbers
Δευτερονόμιον	Deuteronomion	Deuteronomy
History
Ἰησοῦς	Iēsous	Joshua
Κριταί	Kritai	Judges
Ῥούθ	Routh	Ruth
Βασιλειῶν Αʹ (Note: Βασιλειῶν (Basileiōn) is the genitive plural of Βασιλεία (Basileia).)	1 Basileiōn	Kings I (I Samuel)
Βασιλειῶν Βʹ	2 Basileiōn	Kings II (II Samuel)
Βασιλειῶν Γʹ	3 Basileiōn	Kings III (I Kings)
Βασιλειῶν Δʹ	4 Basileiōn	Kings IV (II Kings)
Παραλειπομένων Αʹ	1 Paraleipomenōn (Note: That is, Of things set aside from Ἔσδρας Αʹ.)	Chronicles I
Παραλειπομένων Βʹ	2 Paraleipomenōn	Chronicles II
Ἔσδρας Αʹ	1 Esdras	1 Esdras
Ἔσδρας Βʹ	2 Esdras	Ezra-Nehemiah
Ἐσθήρ	Esthēr	Esther (Note: Includes additions.)
Ἰουδίθ	Ioudith	Judith
Τωβίτ (Note: also called Τωβείτ or Τωβίθ in some sources.)	Tōbit (Note: or Tōbeit or Tōbith)	Tobit
Μακκαβαίων Αʹ	1 Makkabaiōn	Maccabees I
Μακκαβαίων Βʹ	2 Makkabaiōn	Maccabees II
Μακκαβαίων Γʹ	3 Makkabaiōn	Maccabees III
Wisdom
Ψαλμοί	Psalmoi	Psalms
Ψαλμός ΡΝΑʹ	Psalmos 151	Psalm 151
Προσευχὴ Μανασσῆ	Proseuchē Manassē	Prayer of Manasseh
Ὠδαί	Odai	Odes
Παροιμίαι	Paroimiai	Proverbs
Ἐκκλησιαστής	Ekklēsiastēs	Ecclesiastes
Ἆσμα Ἀσμάτων	Asma Asmatōn	Song of Songs or Song of Solomon or Canticle of Canticles
Ἰώβ	Iōb	Job
Σοφία Σαλομῶντος	Sophia Salomōntos	Wisdom or Wisdom of Solomon
Σοφία Ἰησοῦ Σειράχ	Sophia Iēsou Seirach	Sirach or Ecclesiasticus or Wisdom of Sirach
Prophets
Ὡσηέ Αʹ	I. Hōsēe	Hosea
Ἀμώς Βʹ	II. Āmōs	Amos
Μιχαίας Γʹ	III. Michaias	Micah
Ἰωήλ Δʹ	IV. Iōēl	Joel
Ὀβδιού Εʹ (Note: Obdiou is genitive from "The vision of Obdias", which opens the book.)	V. Obdiou	Obadiah
Ἰωνᾶς Ϛ'	VI. Iōnas	Jonah
Ναούμ Ζʹ	VII. Naoum	Nahum
Ἀμβακούμ Ηʹ	VIII. Ambakoum	Habakkuk
Σοφονίας Θʹ	IX. Sophonias	Zephaniah
Ἀγγαῖος Ιʹ	X. Angaios	Haggai
Ζαχαρίας ΙΑʹ	XI. Zacharias	Zachariah
Μαλαχίας ΙΒʹ	XII. Malachias	Malachi
Ἠσαΐας	Ēsaias	Isaiah
Ἱερεμίας	Hieremias	Jeremiah
Βαρούχ	Barouch	Baruch
Θρῆνοι	Thrēnoi	Lamentations
Ἐπιστολὴ Ἰερεμίου	Epistolē Ieremiou	Letter of Jeremiah
Ἰεζεκιήλ	Iezekiēl	Ezekiel
Δανιήλ	Daniēl	Daniel (Note: Includes additions.)
Appendix
Μακκαβαίων Δ'	4 Makkabaiōn	Maccabees IV (Note: Originally placed after 3 Maccabees and before Psalms, but placed in the appendix of some Eastern Orthodox Bibles if it is included.)
Ψαλμοὶ Σαλομῶντος	Psalmoi Salomōntos	Psalms of Solomon (Note: Originally placed in an appendix after the Old and New Testaments in the Table of Contents of the Codex Alexandrinus, but not included in any modern canon due to its text being lost until the 17th century.)

=== Textual analysis ===
The inter-relationship between significant ancient Old Testament manuscripts (some identified by their siglum). LXX denotes the original Septuagint.

Modern scholarship holds that the LXX was written from the 3rd through the 1st centuries BC, but nearly all attempts at dating specific books (except for the Pentateuch, early- to mid-3rd century BC) are tentative. Later Jewish revisions and recensions of the Greek against the Hebrew are well-attested. The best-known are Aquila (128 AD), Symmachus, and Theodotion. These three, to varying degrees, are more-literal renderings of their contemporary Hebrew scriptures compared to the Old Greek (the original LXX). Modern scholars consider one (or more) of the three to be new Greek versions of the Hebrew Bible.

Although much of Origen's Hexapla (a six-version critical edition of the Hebrew Bible) is lost, several compilations of fragments are available. Origen kept a column for the Old Greek (the LXX), which included readings from all the Greek versions in a critical apparatus with diacritical marks indicating to which version each line belonged. Perhaps the Hexapla was never copied in its entirety, but Origen's combined text was copied frequently (eventually without the editing marks) and the older uncombined text of the LXX was neglected. The combined text was the first major Christian recension of the LXX, often called the Hexaplar recension. Two other major recensions were identified in the century following Origen by Jerome, who attributed these to Lucian (the Lucianic, or Antiochene, recension) and Hesychius (the Hesychian, or Alexandrian, recension).

==== Manuscripts ====
The oldest manuscripts of the LXX include 2nd-century BC fragments of Leviticus and Deuteronomy (Rahlfs nos. 801, 819, and 957) and 1st-century BC fragments of Genesis, Exodus, Leviticus, Numbers, Deuteronomy, and the Twelve Minor Prophets (Alfred Rahlfs nos. 802, 803, 805, 848, 942, and 943). Relatively-complete manuscripts of the LXX postdate the Hexaplar recension, and include the 4th-century Codex Vaticanus and the 5th-century Codex Alexandrinus. These are the oldest surviving nearly complete manuscripts of the Old Testament in any language; the oldest extant complete Hebrew texts date to about 600 years later, from the first half of the 10th century. The 4th-century Codex Sinaiticus also partially survives, with many Old Testament texts. The Jewish (and, later, Christian) revisions and recensions are largely responsible for the divergence of the codices. The Codex Marchalianus is another notable manuscript.

==== Differences from the Vulgate and the Masoretic Text (𝕸) ====
The text of the LXX is generally close to that of the 𝕸 and Vulgate. Genesis 4:1–6 is identical in the LXX, Vulgate and 𝕸, and Genesis 4:8 to the end of the chapter is the same. There is only one noticeable difference in that chapter, at Genesis 4:7, reflecting an issue of interpretation also highlighted by the Jewish Tanna Issi ben Judah:

Genesis 4:7, LXX and English Translation (NETS)	Genesis 4:7, Masoretic and English Translation from 𝕸 (Judaica Press)	Genesis 4:7, Latin Vulgate and English Translation (Douay-Rheims)
οὐκ ἐὰν ὀρθῶς προσενέγκῃς, ὀρθῶς δὲ μὴ διέλῃς, ἥμαρτες; ἡσύχασον· πρὸς σὲ ἡ ἀποστροφὴ αὐτοῦ, καὶ σὺ ἄρξεις αὐτοῦ. Have you not sinned if you have brought it righteously, but not righteously divided it? Be calm, to you shall be his submission, and you shall rule over him.	הֲלוֹא אִם תֵּיטִיב שְׂאֵת וְאִם לֹא תֵיטִיב לַפֶּתַח חַטָּאת רֹבֵץ וְאֵלֶיךָ תְּשׁוּקָתוֹ וְאַתָּה תִּמְשָׁל בּוֹ: Is it not so that if you improve, it will be forgiven you? If you do not improve, however, at the entrance, sin is lying, and to you is its longing, but you can rule over it.	nonne si bene egeris, recipies : sin autem male, statim in foribus peccatum aderit? sed sub te erit appetitus ejus, et tu dominaberis illius. If thou do well, shalt thou not receive? but if ill, shall not sin forthwith be present at the door? but the lust thereof shall be under thee, and thou shalt have dominion over it.

The differences between the LXX and the 𝕸 fall into four categories:

1. Different Hebrew sources for the 𝕸 and the LXX. Evidence of this can be found throughout the Old Testament. A subtle example may be found in Isaiah 36:11; the meaning remains the same, but the choice of words evidences a different text. The 𝕸 reads וְאַל־תְּדַבֵּ֤ר אֵלֵ֙ינוּ֙ יְהוּדִ֔ית בְּאׇזְנֵ֣י הָעָ֔ם אֲשֶׁ֖ר עַל־הַחוֹמָֽה׃ 'do not speak to us in Judean in the hearing of the people on the wall.' The same verse in the LXX reads, according to the translation of Brenton: "and speak not to us in the Jewish tongue: and wherefore speakest thou in the ears of the men on the wall." The 𝕸 reads "people," whereas the LXX reads "men." This difference is very minor and does not affect the meaning of the verse. Scholars had used discrepancies such as this to claim that the LXX was a poor translation of the Hebrew original. This verse is found in the Isaiah Scroll from Qumran; however, the Hebrew 'the men' appears in place of 'the people'. This discovery, and others like it, showed that even seemingly minor differences in translation could result from variant Hebrew source texts.
2. Differences in interpretation stemming from the same Hebrew text. An example is Genesis 4:7, shown above.
3. Differences as a result of idiomatic translation issues: A Hebrew idiom may not be easily translated into Greek, and some differences are imparted. In Psalm 47:10, the 𝕸 reads: "for the guardians of the earth belong to God, who is greatly exalted." The LXX reads, "To God are the mighty ones of the earth."
4. Transmission changes in Hebrew or Greek: Revision or recension changes and copying errors.

==== Dead Sea Scrolls ====
The Biblical manuscripts found in Qumran, commonly known as the Dead Sea Scrolls (DSS), have prompted comparisons of the texts associated with the Hebrew Bible (including the LXX). Emanuel Tov, editor of the translated scrolls, identifies five broad variants of DSS texts:

1. Proto-Masoretic: A stable text and numerous, distinct agreements with 𝕸. About 60 per cent of the Biblical scrolls (including 1QIsa-b) are in this category.
2. Pre-LXX: Manuscripts which have distinctive affinities with the Greek Bible. About five per cent of the Biblical scrolls, they include 4QDeut-q, 4QSam-a, 4QJer-b, and 4QJer-d. In addition to these manuscripts, several others share similarities with the LXX but do not fall into this category.
3. The Qumran "Living Bible": Manuscripts which, according to Tov, were copied in accordance with the "Qumran practice": distinctive, long orthography and morphology, frequent errors and corrections, and a free approach to the text. They make up about 20 per cent of the Biblical corpus, including the Isaiah Scroll (1QIsa-a).
4. Pre-Samaritan: DSS manuscripts which reflect the textual form of the Samaritan Pentateuch, although the Samaritan Bible is later and contains information not found in these earlier scrolls, (such as God's holy mountain at Shechem, rather than Jerusalem). These manuscripts, characterized by orthographic corrections and harmonizations with parallel texts elsewhere in the Pentateuch, are about five per cent of the Biblical scrolls and include 4QpaleoExod-m.
5. Non-aligned: No consistent alignment with any of the other four text types. About 10 per cent of the Biblical scrolls, they include 4QDeut-b, 4QDeut-c, 4QDeut-h, 4QIsa-c, and 4QDan-a. (Note: These percentages are disputed. Other scholars credit the Proto-Masoretic texts with 40 per cent, and posit larger contributions from Qumran-style and non-aligned texts. The Canon Debate, McDonald and Sanders editors (2002), chapter 6: "Questions of Canon through the Dead Sea Scrolls" by James C. VanderKam, p. 94, citing private communication with Emanuel Tov on biblical manuscripts: Qumran scribe type c. 25 per cent, proto-𝕸 c. 40 per cent, pre-Samaritan texts c.5 per cent, texts close to the Hebrew model for the LXX c. 5 per cent and nonaligned c. 25 per cent.)

The textual sources present a variety of readings; Bastiaan Van Elderen compares three variations of Deuteronomy 32:43, the Song of Moses:

Deuteronomy 32.43, Masoretic	Deuteronomy 32.43, Qumran	Deuteronomy 32.43, LXX
.. 1 Shout for joy, O nations, with his people 2 For he will avenge the blood of his servants 3 And will render vengeance to his adversaries... 4 And will purge his land, his people..	1 Shout for joy, O heavens, with him 2 And worship him, all you divine ones.. 3 For he will avenge the blood of his sons. 4 And he will render vengeance to his adversaries. 5 And he will recompense the ones hating him 6 And he purges the land of his people..	1 Shout for joy, O heavens, with him 2 And let all the sons of God worship him 3 Shout for joy, O nations, with his people 4 And let all the angels of God be strong in him 5 Because he avenges the blood of his sons. 6 And he will avenge and recompense justice to his enemies. 7 And he will recompense the ones hating. 8 And the Lord will cleanse the land of his people..

=== Print editions ===
The text of all print editions is derived from the recensions of Origen, Lucian, or Hesychius:

- The editio princeps is the Complutensian Polyglot Bible. Based on now-lost manuscripts, it is one of the received texts used for the KJV (similar to the Textus Receptus) and seems to reflect quite early readings.
- The Brian Walton Polyglot by Brian Walton is one of the few versions that includes a LXX not based on the Egyptian Alexandria-type text (such as Vaticanus, Alexandrinus and Sinaiticus), but follows the majority which agree (like the Complutensian Polyglot).
- The Aldine edition (begun by Aldus Manutius) was published in Venice in 1518. The editor says he collated ancient, unspecified manuscripts, and the work has been reprinted several times.
- The Roman or Sixtine LXX, which uses Codex Vaticanus as the base text and later manuscripts for the lacunae in the uncial manuscript. It was published in 1587 under the direction of Antonio Carafa, with the help of Roman scholars Gugliemo Sirleto, Antonio Agelli and Petrus Morinus and by the authority of Sixtus V, to assist revisers preparing the Latin Vulgate edition ordered by the Council of Trent. It is the textus receptus of the Greek Old Testament and has been published in a number of editions, such as: those of Robert Holmes and James Parsons (Oxford, 1798–1827), the seven editions of Constantin von Tischendorf which appeared at Leipzig between 1850 and 1887 (the last two published after the death of the author and revised by Nestle), and the four editions of Henry Barclay Swete (Cambridge, 1887–95, 1901, 1909). A detailed description of this edition has been made by H. B. Swete in An Introduction to the Old Testament in Greek (1900), pp. 174–182.
- Grabe's edition was published in Oxford from 1707 to 1720 and reproduced, imperfectly, the Codex Alexandrinus of London. For partial editions, see Fulcran Vigouroux, Dictionnaire de la Bible, 1643 and later.
- Alfred Rahlfs' edition of the Septuagint. Alfred Rahlfs, a LXX researcher at the University of Göttingen, began a manual edition of the LXX in 1917 or 1918. The completed Septuaginta, published in 1935, relies mainly on the Vaticanus, Sinaiticus and Alexandrinus and presents a critical framework with variants from these and several other sources.
- The Göttingen Septuagint (Septuaginta: Vetus Testamentum Graecum), a critical version in multiple volumes published from 1931 to the present, is not yet complete; the largest missing parts are the historical books (Joshua, Judges, Samuel, Kings, Chronicles), Proverbs and Song of Songs, as well as a new edition of Psalms. Its two critical apparatuses present variant readings in the Old Greek text and variants of the other Greek recensions (i.e., the Hexapla, Theodotion, Symmachus, Aquilla, Lucian).
- In 2006, a revision of Alfred Rahlfs' Septuaginta was published by the German Bible Society. This revised edition includes over a thousand changes. The text of this revised edition contains changes in the diacritics, and only two wording changes: in Isaiah 5:17 and 53:2, Is 5:17 ἀπειλημμένων became ἀπηλειμμένων, and Is 53:2 ἀνηγγείλαμεν became by conjecture ἀνέτειλε μένà.
- The Apostolic Bible Polyglot contains a LXX text derived primarily from the agreement of any two of the Complutensian Polyglot, the Sixtine, and the Aldine texts.
- Septuaginta: A Reader's Edition, a 2018 reader's edition of the LXX using the text of the 2006 revised edition of Rahlf's Septuaginta.

=== Onomastics ===
One of the main challenges, faced by translators during their work, emanated from the need to implement appropriate Greek forms for various onomastic terms, used in the Hebrew Bible. Most onomastic terms (toponyms, anthroponyms) of the Hebrew Bible were rendered by corresponding Greek terms that were similar in form and sounding, with some notable exceptions.

One of those exceptions was related to a specific group of onomastic terms for the region of Aram and ancient Arameans. Influenced by Greek onomastic terminology, translators decided to adopt Greek custom of using "Syrian" labels as designations for Arameans, their lands and language, thus abandoning endonymic (native) terms, that were used in the Hebrew Bible. In the Greek translation, the region of Aram was commonly labeled as "Syria", while Arameans were labeled as "Syrians". Such adoption and implementation of terms that were foreign (exonymic) had far-reaching influence on later terminology related to Arameans and their lands, since the same terminology was reflected in later Latin and other translations of the LXX, including the English translation.

Reflecting on those problems, American orientalist Robert W. Rogers (d. 1930) noted in 1921: "it is most unfortunate that Syria and Syrians ever came into the English versions. It should always be Aram and the Aramaeans".

=== English translations ===
The first English translation (which excluded the apocrypha) was Charles Thomson's in 1808, which was revised and enlarged by C. A. Muses in 1954 and published by the Falcon's Wing Press.

The Septuagint with Apocrypha: Greek and English was translated by Lancelot Brenton in 1844. It is the traditional translation, and most of the time since its publication it has been the only one readily available. It has also been continually in print. The translation, based on the Codex Vaticanus, contains the Greek and English texts in parallel columns. It has an average of four footnoted, transliterated words per page, abbreviated Alex and GK.

The Complete Apostles' Bible (translated by Paul W. Esposito) was published in 2007. Using 𝕸 in the 23rd Psalm (and possibly elsewhere), it omits the apocrypha.

A New English Translation of the Septuagint and the Other Greek Translations Traditionally Included Under that Title (NETS), an academic translation based on the New Revised Standard version (in turn based on 𝕸) was published by the International Organization for Septuagint and Cognate Studies (IOSCS) in October 2007.

The Apostolic Bible Polyglot, published in 2003, features a Greek-English interlinear LXX. It includes the Greek books of the Hebrew canon (without the apocrypha) and the Greek New Testament; the whole Bible is numerically coded to a new version of the Strong numbering system created to add words not present in the original numbering by Strong. The edition is set in monotonic orthography. The version includes a Bible concordance and index.

The Orthodox Study Bible, published in early 2008, features a new translation of the LXX based on the Alfred Rahlfs' edition of the Greek text. Two additional major sources have been added: the 1851 Brenton translation and the New King James Version text in places where the translation matches the Hebrew Masoretic text. This edition includes the NKJV New Testament and extensive commentary from an Eastern Orthodox perspective.

Nicholas King completed The Old Testament in four volumes and The Bible.

Brenton's Septuagint, Restored Names Version (SRNV) has been published in two volumes. The Hebrew-names restoration, based on the Westminster Leningrad Codex, focuses on the restoration of the Divine Name and has extensive Hebrew and Greek footnotes.

The Holy Orthodox Bible by Peter A. Papoutsis and The Old Testament According to the Seventy by Michael Asser are based on the Greek Septuagint text published by the Apostoliki Diakonia of the Church of Greece.

In 2012, Lexham Press published the Lexham English Septuagint (LES), providing a literal, readable, and transparent English edition of the LXX for modern readers. In 2019, Lexham Press published the Lexham English Septuagint, Second Edition (LES2), making more of an effort than the first to focus on the text as received rather than as produced. Because this approach shifts the point of reference from a diverse group to a single implied reader, the new LES exhibits more consistency than the first edition. "The Lexham English Septuagint (LES), then, is the only contemporary English translation of the LXX that has been made directly from the Greek."

In 2026, Septuagint English Tanakh: The Hebrew Bible according to the Old Greek (SET) was released. It was based on the Masoretic English Tanakh, modified to bring it in line with the Old Greek. It sought to render the Greek into idiomatic American English. It contains extensive footnotes detailing differences with the Masoretic text. The SET is in the public domain.

== Society and journal ==
The International Organization for Septuagint and Cognate Studies (IOSCS), a non-profit learned society, promotes international research into and study of the LXX and related texts. The society declared 8 February 2006 International Septuagint Day, a day to promote the work on campuses and in communities. The IOSCS publishes the Journal of Septuagint and Cognate Studies.

== See also ==
- Biblical apocrypha
- Biblical canon
- Book of Job in Byzantine illuminated manuscripts
- Brenton's English Translation of the Septuagint
- Deuterocanonical books
- Documentary hypothesis – Theory that the Torah was composed over a long period by many authors
- La Bible d'Alexandrie
- Samareitikon
