= Tamil loanwords in Ancient Greek =

Tamil loanwords entered the Greek language through the interactions of Mediterranean and South Indian merchants during different periods in history. Most words had to do with items of trade that were unique to South India. There is a general consensus about Tamil loanwords in Ancient Greek, while a few of the words have competing etymologies.

== Early contacts ==
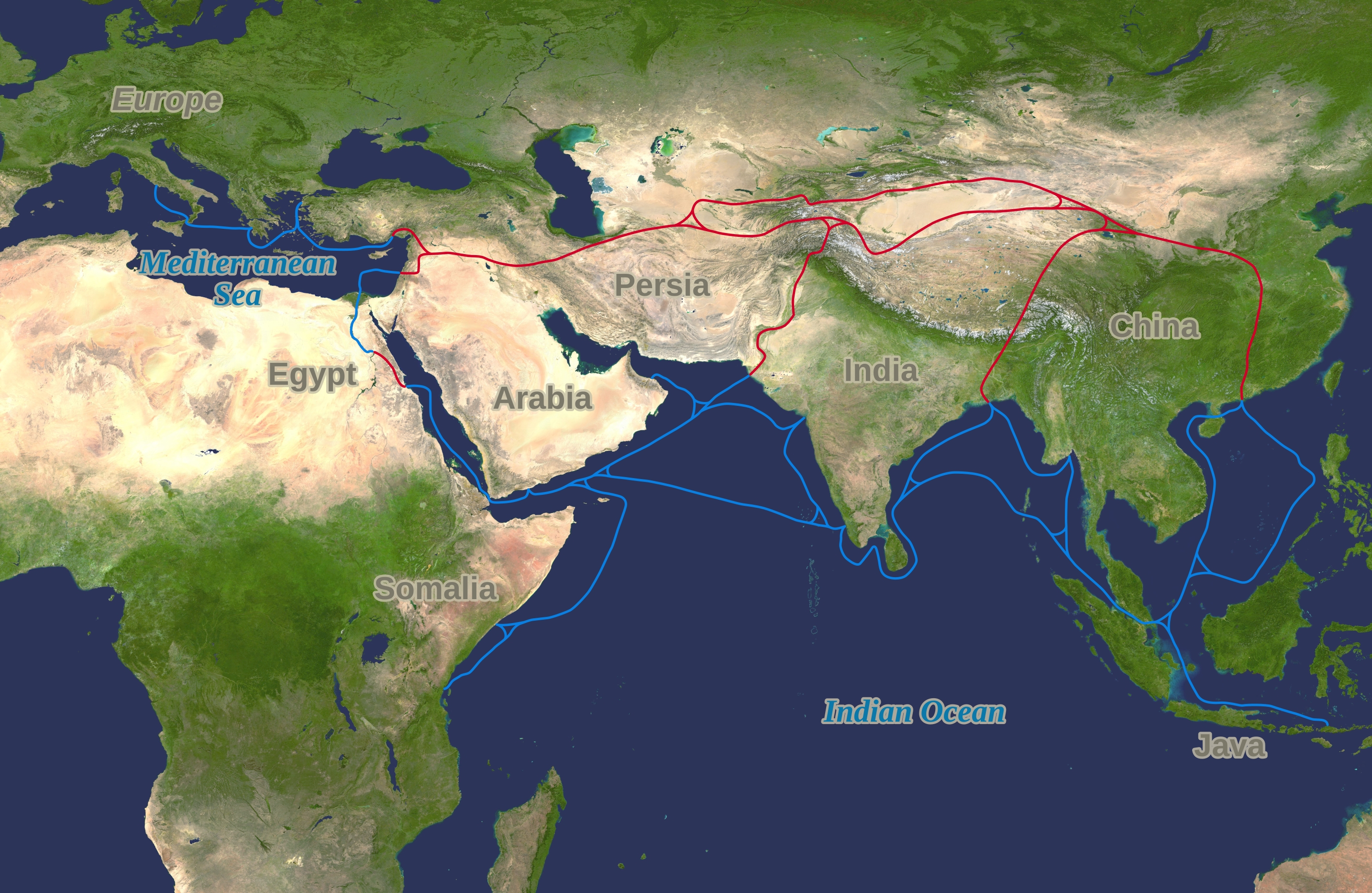
Silk Road and Spice trade, ancient trade routes that linked India with the Old World; carried goods and ideas between the ancient civilisations of the Old World and India. The land routes are red, and the water routes are blue.

The mainstream view is that beginnings of trade between the Mediterranean and South India can be traced back to 500 BCE when the word zingíberis (ζιγγίβερις) derived from Proto-South Dravidian cinki-ver (சிங்கிவேர்) for Ginger first appeared in Greek and thus South India may have been involved in trade with the Mediterranean centuries earlier. But there is evidence that trade between the Indian region and the Mediterranean may have been well established by 1500 BCE. Greek lexicon contains both cultural words that are common to many languages in the general area and loanwords from various other languages.

Greek and Tamil relationship is on firmer ground during the Ptolemaic and later Roman period from 305 BCE to 476 CE when Greek speaking merchants along with others extensively traded with Indians in general and Tamils in particular. A Pandyan king, based out of ancient Tamilaham sent embassies twice to Rome, wanting to become the Roman Emperors friend and ally. One of these reached Augustus when he was at Terracina in the eighteenth year after the death of Julius Caesar in 26 BCE and another six years afterwards in 20 BCE. Greeks were employed as mercenaries by many Tamil kings. There were also Greek settlements along the coasts of western and eastern Tamilaham. The Greek–South Indian relationships were impactful enough that a Greek play Charition mime was written with a Dravidian language presumed to be a coastal dialect of either Kannada or Tulu, speaker included in the play dated to 2nd century CE.

== Date of borrowings ==
It is difficult to exactly date the borrowing of Tamil words into Ancient Greek. A few words such as taôs for peacock, agálokhon for Eaglewood and óruza for rice have similar words in Biblical Hebrew and other West Asian languages. Some of the Tamil loanwords in Biblical Hebrew, which are common with Ancient Greek are found at its earliest stage around 1000 BCE to 500 BCE. Franklin Southworth dates the borrowing of the word zingíberis (ζιγγίβερις) derived from Proto-South Dravidian cinki-ver (சிங்கிவேர்) to 500 BCE, where as Kamil Zvelebil derives it from Old Tamil form Inchi-Ver (இஞ்சிவேர்). But a word for cinnamon used by Ctesias in his Indica, namely karpion borrowed from a Tamil word for Cinnamon can be safely dated to 400 BCE. Chaim Rabin dates the Greek word for rice, óruza/όρυζα borrowed via Semitic words for rice, ultimately derived from Tamil to 400 BCE.

Map of ancient oceanic trade, and ports of Tamilakam per Periplus of the Erythraean Sea

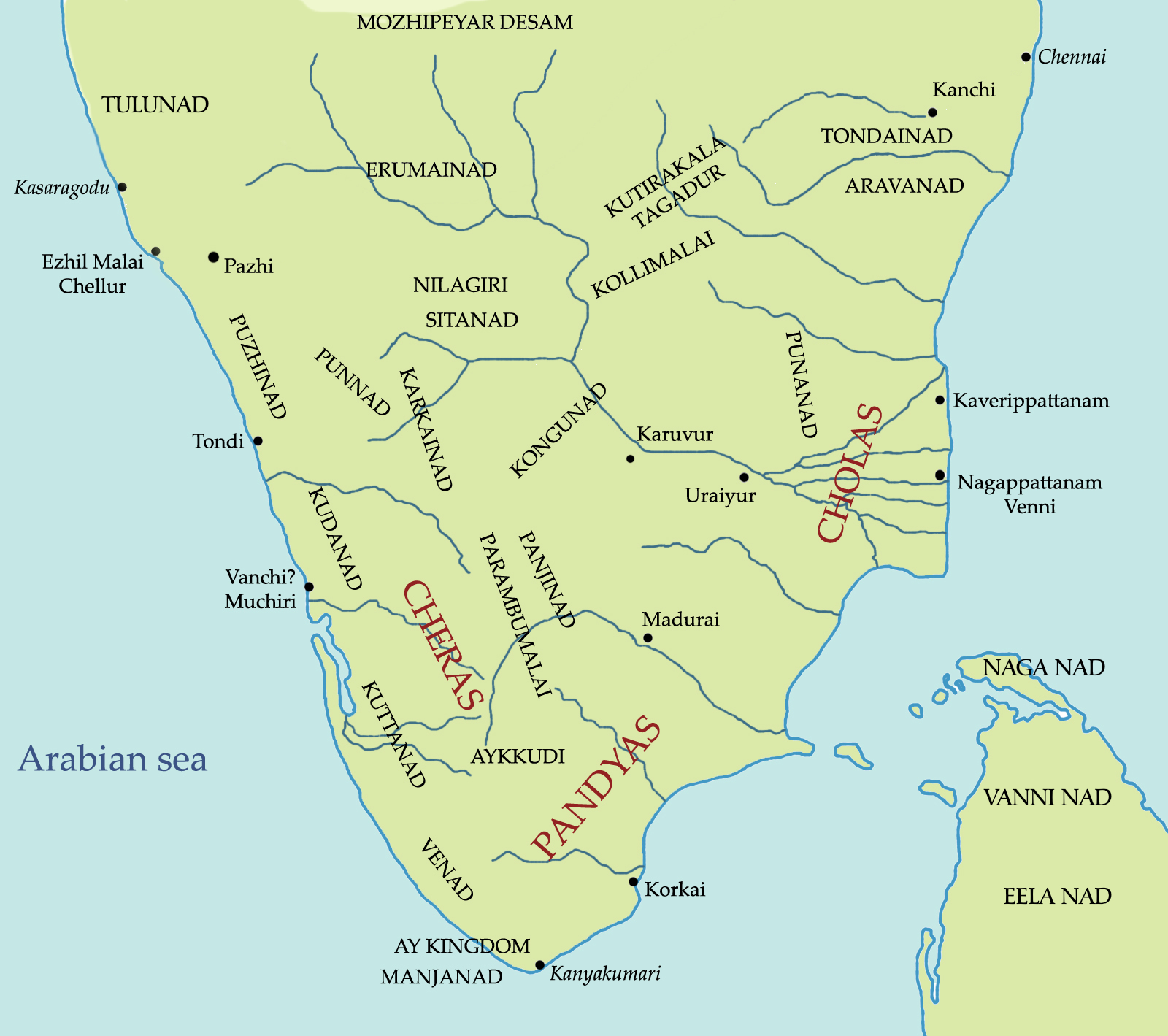
Tamiḻakam during Cankam Period

== Known loan words ==
Known loan words in Ancient Greek
Greek word	Meaning in Greek	Source language	Tamil word	Meaning in Tamil
agálokhon/ἀγάλοχον	Agarwood	Tamil	akil/அகில்	eagle wood
karpion/Καρπιον	cinnamon	Tamil	kaṟuvā/கறுவா	cinnamon
óruza/όρυζα	rice	Tamil via South Arabian (Note: According to Chaim Rabin Greek óruza, Hebrew wאורז are derived from South Arabian areez that was ultimately derived from Tamil arici/அரிசி for rice.)	arici/அரிசி	rice
péperi/πιπέρι	pepper	Tamil or Middle Indo-Aryan	tippili/திப்பிலி	pepper
taôs/ταώς (Note: According to Ernest Klein Greek taôs, Aramaic טוסא, Arabic لطاووس, also Hebrew תכי probably comes ultimately from Tamil tōkai/தோகை for peacock.)	peacock	Tamil	tōkai/தோகை	feather
tadi/ταδι	toddy	Tamil or Dravidian (Kannada or Telugu) via Sanskrit	taṭi/தடி	toddy
zingíberis/ζιγγίβερις	ginger	Proto South Dravidian or Old Tamil (Note: According to Franklin Southworth and Bhadriraju Krishnamurti Greek zingíberis is derived from a Proto South Dravidian form and re-constructed word cinki-ver where as Kamil Zvelebil derives it from Old Tamil inchi-ver/இஞ்சிவேர்.)	cinki-ver or inchi-ver /சிங்கிவேர் or இஞ்சிவேர்	ginger
κόττος/kóttos	chicken	Tamil or Telugu (Note: According to Colin Masica Greek κόττος/kóttos probably comes from a Dravidian term for Chicken and suggests either Tamil kōḻi/கோழி or Telugu Kōḍi/కోడి for chicken.)	kōḻi/கோழி or Kōḍi/కోడి	chicken
κάδος/káddos	pail, bucket, jar, small vessel	Tamil or early Dravidian via Semitic	Kiṇṭi/கிண்டி	small vessel

== See also ==
- Pre-Greek substrate

== Cited literature ==
- Allan, John Andrew (2013), The Cambridge Shorter History of India, Literary Licensing, LLC, ISBN 978-1-2588-0084-0
- Caldwell, Robert (1856). A Comparative Grammar of the Dravidian, Or South-Indian Family of Languages. Harrison. ISBN 978-81-20-60117-8.
- Chandra, Moti (1977). Trade And Trade Routes In Ancient India. Abhinav. ISBN 978-0-712-80117-1.
- Clothey, Fred (2006). Ritualizing on the Boundaries: Continuity and Innovation in the Tamil Diaspora. Univ of South Carolina Press. ISBN 978-1570036477.
- Dishitar, Ramachandra (1971), Origin And Spread Of The Tamils, Oakley, ISBN 978-3-111-59200-8
- Iyengar, Srinivasa (1929), History of the Tamils: From the Earliest Times to 600 A.D, Coomarswamy Naidu & Sons
- James, Gregory (2008), Tamil lexicography, Walter de Gruyter, ISBN 978-1-443-72658-0
- Quattrocchi, Umberto (2000), CRC World dictionary of plant names, CRC, ISBN 978-0-849-32677-6
- Kanakasabhai, V (2018). The Tamils Eighteen Hundred Years Ago. Forgotten Books. ISBN 978-0331601978.
- Masica, Colin (1979). Deshpande, Madhav; Hook, Peter (eds.). Aryan and Non-Aryan in India. University of Michigan. ISBN 978-0-89148-045-7.
- Pdodolsky, Baruch (1998). Izre'el, Shlomo; Singer, Itmamar; Zadok, Ran (eds.). Past links:Studies in the Languages and Cultures of the Ancient Near East. Eisenbrauns. ISBN 1-57506-035-3.
- Price, Edward (1982), A history of Kannada literature, Asian Educational Service, ISBN 8120600630
- Rabin, Chaim (Oct 1971). Proceedings of the Second International Conference Seminar of Tamil Studies. International Association of Tamil Research. pp. 432–440.
- Rawlinson, H G (1916). Intercourse between India and the western world from the earliest times to the fall of Rome. Cambridge University.
- Shulman, David (2016), Tamil: A biography, Harvard University Press, ISBN 978-0-674-05992-4
- Southworth, Franklin (2005), Linguistic Archaeology of South Asia, Routledge, ISBN 978-0-415-33323-8
