= Kedar =

Kedar or Qedar is a surname or given name, as well as a name of places.

== People ==
=== Surname ===
- Benjamin Kedar-Kopfstein, Israeli professor emeritus
- Benjamin Z. Kedar, Israeli history professor emeritus
- Dvora Kedar, Israeli actress
- Ido Kedar, autistic activist
- Kedar Devdhar, Indian cricketer
- Mordechai Kedar, Israeli scholar and professor
- Nurit Kedar, Israeli producer and director of documentary films
- Orit Kedar, Israeli political scientist and professor
- Ruth Kedar, Brazilian-born artist and designer
- Sunil Chhatrapal Kedar, Indian politician
- Veronica Kedar, Israeli actress, director, producer and screenwriter

=== Forename ===
- Kedar "Bud" Pyatt, American mathematician
- Kedar Bhave, Indian cricketer
- Kedar Chidabhai Dawar, Indian politician
- Kedar Das, Indian politician and leader of the Communist Party of India
- Kedar Devdhar, Indian cricketer
- Kedar Ghimire, Nepalese comedian, actor, scriptwriter, and film producer
- Kedar Hazra, Indian politician
- Kedar Jadhav, Indian cricketer
- Kedar Karki, Nepalese politician
- Kedar Massenburg, American record producer and record label executive
- Kedar Naik, Indian politician and businessman
- Kedar Nath Pandey, Indian politician and leader of Communist Party of India
- Kedar Nath Singh (Bihar politician), Indian politician
- Kedar Nath Singh (Uttar Pradesh politician), Indian politician
- Kedarnath Singh, Indian poet
- Kedar Pandey, Indian freedom fighter and National Congress politician
- Kedar Paswan, Indian politician
- Kedar Prasad Gupta, Indian politician
- Kedar Shah, Indian water polo player
- Kedar Shinde, Indian film director and screenwriter
- Kedar Williams-Stirling, English actor
- Kedarnath Das, Indian politician
- Kidar Nath Sahani, governor of the Indian states of Sikkim
- Kidar Sharma, Indian film director, producer and screenwriter
- Qedar (person), ancestor of the Qedarite tribal confederation

== Other uses ==
- Qedarites, ancient Arabian Tribe from modern day Saudi Arabia
- Kedar Gouri, film directed by Nitai Palit
- Panch Kedar, five Hindu temples or holy places of the Shaivite sect
- Kedar (Israeli settlement), rural Israeli settlement in the West Bank
- Kedar (raga), a raga in Indian classical music named after Lord Shiva
- Kedar Karki cabinet, 8th provincial government of Koshi Province
- Calodesma kedar, moth of the family Erebidae
- Shri Kedar Temple, medieval Hindu temple
- Kedar Nath Girdharilal Khatri PG College Moradabad, college in Moradabad
- Kedaram, a raga in Carnatic music (South Indian classical music)
- Kedarnath (mountain), two mountains in the Gangotri Group of peaks in the western Garhwal Himalaya
