= Emanuel Tov =

Dutch–Israeli biblical scholar and linguist (born 1941)

Emanuel Tov FBA
- עמנואל טוב
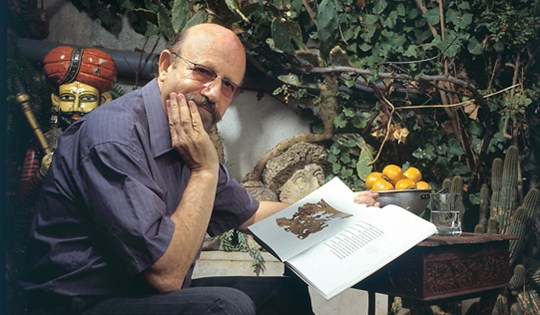
- Born: Menno Toff; 15 September 1941 (age 85); Amsterdam, the Netherlands
- Occupation: Biblical scholar
- Title: Emeritus Professor in the Department of Bible at the Hebrew University of Jerusalem
- Spouse: Lika (née Aa)
- Children: Three
- Awards: Honorary doctorates from the University of Vienna, University of Salzburg, and University of Copenhagen; Israel Prize in biblical studies

Academic background
- Education: Harvard University, Hebrew University of Jerusalem
- Thesis: "The Septuagint Translation of Jeremiah and Baruch" (1973)
- Doctoral advisor: Shemaryahu Talmon, Frank Moore Cross

Academic work
- Discipline: Biblical studies
- Sub-discipline: Textual studies
- Institutions: Hebrew University of Jerusalem

Emanuel Tov FBA (Hebrew: עמנואל טוב; born Menno Toff, 15 September 1941) is a Dutch–Israeli biblical scholar and linguist, emeritus J. L. Magnes Professor of Bible Studies in the Department of Bible at the Hebrew University of Jerusalem. He has been intimately involved with the Dead Sea Scrolls for many decades, and from 1991, he was appointed editor-in-chief of the Dead Sea Scrolls Publication Project.

== Biography ==
Emanuel Tov was born in Amsterdam, the Netherlands on 15 September 1941, during the Nazi German occupation. During the Holocaust, when Tov was one year old, his parents Juda (Jo) Toff and Toos Neeter were deported to concentration camps, and they entrusted him to the care of a Christian family, and following the war he grew up with his uncle Juda Koekoek and aunt Elisabeth Koekoek-Toff as one of their children.

From age 14, he was active in Habonim Dror, a Labour Zionist youth movement, and served as one of its leaders. At age 18, the movement motivated him to go to Israel for training as a leader and in 1960 he became the general secretary of that movement in the Netherlands. In 1961, he immigrated to Israel.

Emanuel Tov is married to Lika (née Aa). Tov and Lika have three children (a daughter Ophira, and two sons, Ariel and Amitai) and four granddaughters.

=== Education ===
Tov studied at Boerhaaveschool and then at Kohnstamm School, in South Amsterdam. At the age of 12, Tov started studying Latin and Greek language at the Spinoza Lyceum, where he met his future wife Lika Aa. At the age of 18, he finished his studies at a gymnasium, where he learned classical and modern European languages, and at the same time learned Hebrew at a Talmud Torah from his Bar Mitzvah.

Tov spent a year in Israel (from 1959 to 1960) at Machon L'Madrichei Chutz La'Aretz, studying for leadership in the youth movement Habonim. He sang in the choir and learned to play the flute. Tov then returned to the Netherlands.

In October 1961, Tov decided to return to Israel to study at the Hebrew University of Jerusalem. In 1964 he completed his B.A. in Bible and Greek literature, and in 1967 he received his M.A. in Hebrew Bible, while serving also as an assistant in the Bible Dept. and at the Hebrew University Bible Project. In 1967–1969, he continued his studies at the Dept. for Near Eastern Studies and Languages at Harvard University. His dissertation, written under the guidance of Professors Shemaryahu Talmon of the Hebrew University and Frank Moore Cross of Harvard University, was submitted to the Hebrew University in 1973 as "The Septuagint Translation of Jeremiah and Baruch" (summa cum laude), earned him a PhD from the Hebrew University.

Upon his return to Israel, he worked as an assistant at the University of Haifa and at the Hebrew University.

=== Teaching ===
In 1986, he was appointed professor at the Hebrew University, and in 1990 he became the J. L. Magnes Professor of Bible Studies. Served as visiting professor at the Universities of Oxford, Uppsala, Doshisha (Kyoto), Macquarie and Sydney, Stellenbosch, Vrije Universiteit, University of Pennsylvania, the Pontifical Gregorian University, Halle in Germany, the Protestants Theologische Universiteit and the Pontificial Biblical University. He stayed at Institutes for Advanced Studies at the Hebrew University in Jerusalem, NIAS, Annenberg in the US, Oxford Centre for Postgraduate Hebrew Studies and the Lichtenberg Kolleg in Germany.

=== Academic work ===
He was one of the editors of the Hebrew University Bible Project. He is a member of the editorial board of the journals Dead Sea Discoveries and the Journal of Jewish Studies, and served on the Academic committee of the Magnes Press. He is the co-founder and chairman (1991–2000) of the Dead Sea Scrolls Foundation, a Member of the Academic Committee of the Orion Center for the Study of the Dead Sea Scrolls, and Senior Associate Fellow and an Honorary Fellow of the Oxford Centre for Postgraduate Hebrew Studies.

From 1990 to 2009 he was the editor-in-chief of the international Dead Sea Scrolls Publication Project, which during those years produced 33 volumes of the series Discoveries in the Judean Desert as well as two concordances.

He also published an electronic edition of all the extra-biblical Qumran scrolls and a six-volume printed edition of the scrolls meant for the general public. He also created electronic editions of the Hebrew and Greek Bible.

== Prizes and honorary titles ==
- 1999 – 2004 – Humboldt Research Prize, Germany
- 2003 – Ubbo Emmius medal, University of Groningen
- 2004 – Emet Prize for Biblical Research, Israel
- 2006 – Appointed Corresponding Fellow of the British Academy
- 2008 – Honorary doctorate from the University of Vienna
- 2009 – Israel Prize in biblical studies
- 2010 – Samaritan Medal for Humanitarian Achievement
- 2012 – Appointed Member of the Israel Academy of Sciences and Humanities
- 2017 – Appointed Member of the American Academy of Arts and Sciences
- 2019 – Honorary doctorate from the University of Salzburg
- 2021 – Honorary doctorate from the University of Copenhagen
- 2023 - The Salo W. and Jeannette M. Baron Award for Scholarly Excellence in Research of the Jewish Experience
- 2024 - Awarded lifetime status of “Highly Ranked Scholar” by ScholarGPS (Bible, # 1, worldwide)

== Research ==
=== Septuagint ===
Emanuel Tov's studies on the Septuagint focused first on inner-translational developments and gradually moved to the importance of this translation for the study of the Bible: the early revisions of the Septuagint, translation technique, the reconstruction of the Hebrew parent text of the Greek translation, the value of the Septuagint for the textual study of the Hebrew Bible, the importance of certain Septuagint books for the exegesis of the Hebrew books and the understanding of their literary development, the place of the Hebrew source of the Septuagint in the development of the text of the Bible.

Tov's initial publications on the Septuagint deal with that translation's early revisions that were intended to approximate the Greek text to the Hebrew text current in Israel from the 1st century BCE until the 2nd century CE. For that research, he established sound principles by determining the criteria for defining and characterizing the revisions. His preoccupation with matters of translation technique and the reconstruction of the Hebrew parent text of the Septuagint was influenced by his practical work in the HUBP (Hebrew University Bible Project). In that research, he combined the field work in that project with the formulation of abstract rules for the evaluation of details in the Septuagint, constantly cross-fertilizing both areas. These rules were formulated in his theoretical book on the Septuagint that grew out of his courses at the Hebrew University, each year on a different Bible book

Subsequently, the focus of Tov's interest moved to the importance of the Septuagint for biblical scholarship, both for textual and literary criticism. In several books, the Septuagint reflects a Hebrew basis that needs to be taken into consideration in the exegesis of those books beyond small details, both when, according to Tov, the Hebrew parent text of the Septuagint preceded the Masoretic Text (Joshua, 1 Samuel 16–18, Jeremiah, Ezekiel, etc.) and when it serves as an exegetical layer reacting to the forerunner of the Masoretic Text (1 Kings, Esther, and Daniel). According to Tov, in all these books the exegete of the Hebrew books must take the Greek translation into consideration. A precondition for this procedure is that the analysis of the translation technique as described in the previous paragraph will have established that the Septuagint is a good source for analyzing the text that lay in front of him. From among all the early witnesses of the biblical text, the best ones for analyzing the stages of its literary development are the Masoretic Text and the Septuagint, several Qumran texts and the Samaritan Pentateuch. Tov believes that the analysis of early witnesses such as the Septuagint enriches our exegesis and helps us in understanding the last stages of the development of the biblical literature in specific books. In his more recent work, Tov characterizes the source of LXX-Pentateuch as displaying harmonizing features shared with the Samaritan Pentateuch and related texts.

=== Development of the Bible text ===
Emanuel Tov does not describe the development of the biblical text based on abstract theories, but tries to take the evidence of the ancient manuscripts and versions as his point of departure. It is clear that in antiquity many versions of the Bible were circulating, as is evident from the textual plurality at Qumran. All the manuscripts differed from one another, but within that plurality one may recognize some groups (families). Tov qualified this plurality by providing the internal statistics of the different types of the Qumran scrolls. He also described the socio-religious background of some groups of the Judean Desert scrolls.

An important link in this argumentation is the group of the so-called 4QReworked Pentateuch texts. Ten years after Tov published this group of documents, he realized that these texts do not reflect a single non-biblical rewritten Pentateuch composition, but a cluster of biblical texts that included many exegetical elements. These texts reflect a link in the series of developing biblical texts.

Tov's studies on the Septuagint and 4QReworked Pentateuch led him to new thoughts regarding the development of the last stages of the biblical books and the original text of these books. In his view, the early stages of the biblical books such as reflected in the Septuagint of 1 Samuel, Jeremiah, and Ezekiel, show that the formulations of these books developed stage by stage. This reconstructed development makes it difficult to posit an original text of the biblical books in the usual sense of the word. In Tov's view, there was not one original text, but a series of "original texts." This view developed after the appearance of the second edition of his Textual Criticism of the Hebrew Bible (2001) and was emphasized more in the third edition (2012).

=== The development of the text of the Torah ===
In studies primarily carried out in the 2010s, Tov focused on the special textual status of the Torah. In his view, the textual development of the Torah differed from that of all other Scripture books. Quite unusually its textual witnesses may be divided into two text blocks. "Block I" contains the Masoretic Text group consisting of proto-MT scrolls and the followers of MT, among them a group of tefillin. "Block II" consists of a large group consisting of the source of LXX, the SP group, the Qumran tefillin, and more. The latter block usually contains a popularizing text featuring harmonizing and facilitating readings, while Block I contains a more original text.

=== Dead Sea Scrolls and the Qumran scribes ===
Emanuel Tov dealt with various aspects of the Qumran scrolls, but his most central publications pertain to the Qumran scribes. In 2004, he published a detailed monograph on the scribal practices reflected in the Qumran scrolls, suggesting that the information about these scribal practices allows us to obtain a better understanding of the Qumran scrolls. This monograph describes the technical aspects of all the Judean Desert texts, such as the measurements of the columns and sheets, the beginnings and ends of scrolls, systems of correcting mistakes, orthography systems, and a classification of the scrolls according to these parameters.

An important part of this description is Tov's theory on the Qumran scribes. Since 1986, Tov has suggested the division of the Qumran scrolls into two groups distinguished by external features. Group 1 is written in a special spelling (forms like ki’ כיא for כי everywhere), special linguistic forms (like אביכמה in 1QIsa-a for אֲבִיכֶם MT in Isa 51:2 and מואדה in the same scroll for MT מְאֹד in Isa 47:6), and special scribal habits (writing the divine name in the old Hebrew script, erasing elements with lines and writing cancellation dots above and below words and letters, writing dots in the margins guiding the drawing of the lines, etc.). The great majority of the Qumran sectarian scrolls belong to this group; hence Tov's suggestion that these scrolls were written by sectarian scribes, possibly at Qumran. These scribes copied biblical as well as extra-biblical scrolls, altogether one-third of the Qumran scrolls, while the other scrolls (group 2) were brought to Qumran from outside, from one or more localities. Several tefillin found at Qumran were also written in the Qumran Scribal Practice, thus adding a social dimension to this practice as the contents of these tefillin differed from the "rabbinic" tefillin found elsewhere in the Judean Desert. An independent C-14 examination of the material on which some of the scrolls written in the Qumran Scribal Practice were written indicated in 2020 that they differed from the other scrolls.

=== Computer-assisted research of the Bible and the Dead Sea Scrolls ===
Emanuel Tov believes that the examination of the Bible and Dead Sea Scrolls needs to be aided by computer-assisted research and that therefore databases and computer programs need to be developed. He supervised the electronic encoding of the Leningrad Codex in the 1980s. At that time, he also embarked upon a research project together with Prof. Robert A. Kraft of the University of Pennsylvania (CATSS = Computer Assisted Tools for Septuagint Studies). That project, based in Philadelphia and Jerusalem, created a comparative database of all the words in the Masoretic Text and the Septuagint. It was published as a module within the Accordance program (subsequently also within Bible Works and Logos). With the aid of that program, which allows for advanced searches and statistical research, several such investigations have been carried out by Tov and others. Another database edited by Tov contains all the texts and images of the non-biblical Dead Sea Scrolls, in the original languages and in translation, with morphological analysis and search programs. All these programs serve the international community.

=== Honorary volumes ===
- Dead Sea Discoveries, Vol. 8, 1. 2001 (Leiden: Brill, 2001). Qumran Studies, Presented to Emanuel Tov on His Sixtieth Birthday.
- Paul, Shalom M.; Kraft, Robert A.; Schiffman, Lawrence H.; Fields, Weston W.; with the assistance of E. Ben-David, eds. (2002-12-17). Emanuel. Studies in Hebrew Bible, Septuagint, and Dead Sea Scrolls in Honor of Emanuel Tov. Vetus Testamentum, Supplements (VTSup). Vol. 94. Leiden/Boston: E. J. Brill. doi:10.1163/9789004276215. ISBN 978-90-04-12679-4.
- From Qumran to Aleppo: A Discussion with Emanuel Tov about the Textual History of Jewish Scriptures in Honor of his 65th Birthday (ed. A. Lange et al.; FRLANT 230; Göttingen: Vandenhoeck & Ruprecht, 2009)

== Books authored ==
1. The Book of Baruch also Called I Baruch (Greek and Hebrew) (Texts and Translations 8, Pseudepigrapha Series 6; Missoula, Mont.: Scholars Press, 1975).

2. The Septuagint Translation of Jeremiah and Baruch: A Discussion of an Early Revision of Jeremiah 29–52 and Baruch 1:1–3:8 (HSM 8; Missoula, Mont.: Scholars Press, 1976).

3. The Text-Critical Use of the Septuagint in Biblical Research (Jerusalem Biblical Studies 3; Jerusalem: Simor, 1981).

3*. The Text-Critical Use of the Septuagint in Biblical Research (Second Edition, Revised and Enlarged; Jerusalem Biblical Studies 8; Jerusalem: Simor, 1997).

3**. The Text-Critical Use of the Septuagint in Biblical Research (Third Edition, Completely Revised and Enlarged; Winona Lake, IN: Eisenbrauns, 2015).

4. With J. R. Abercrombie, W. Adler, and R. A. Kraft: Computer Assisted Tools for Septuagint Studies (CATSS), Volume 1, Ruth (SCS 20; Atlanta, Georgia: Scholars Press, 1986).

5. A Computerized Data Base for Septuagint Studies: The Parallel Aligned Text of the Greek and Hebrew Bible (CATSS Volume 2; JNSLSup 1; 1986).

6. With D. Barthélemy, D. W. Gooding, and J. Lust: The Story of David and Goliath, Textual and Literary Criticism, Papers of a Joint Venture (OBO 73; Fribourg/Göttingen: Éditions universitaires/Vandenhoeck & Ruprecht, 1986).

7. Textual Criticism of the Bible: An Introduction (Heb.; Jerusalem: Bialik Institute, 1989).

7*. Second corrected printing of: Textual Criticism of the Bible: An Introduction (Heb.; Jerusalem: Bialik Institute, 1997).

7**. Textual Criticism of the Bible: An Introduction (2nd ed., revised and expanded; The Biblical Encyclopaedia Library 31; Heb.; Jerusalem: Bialik Institute, 2013).

7a. Expanded and updated version of 7: Textual Criticism of the Hebrew Bible (Minneapolis and Assen/Maastricht: Fortress Press and Van Gorcum, 1992).

7a*. Textual Criticism of the Hebrew Bible (2d rev. ed.; Minneapolis and Assen: Fortress Press/Royal Van Gorcum, 2001).

7a**. Textual Criticism of the Hebrew Bible (3rd ed., revised and expanded; Minneapolis: Fortress Press, 2012).

7a***. Textual Criticism of the Hebrew Bible (4th ed., revised and expanded; Minneapolis: Fortress Press, 2022).

7b. German version of 7a (revised and updated): Der Text der Hebräischen Bibel: Handbuch der Textkritik (trans. H.-J. Fabry; Stuttgart/Berlin/Cologne: Kohlhammer, 1997).

7c. Russian version of 7b (revised and updated): Tekstologiya Vetchoga Zaveta (trans. K. Burmistrov and G. Jastrebov; Moscow: Biblisko-Bagaslovski Institut Sv. Apostola Andrjeya [St. Andrews Theological Seminary], 2001).

8. With the collaboration of R. A. Kraft: The Greek Minor Prophets Scroll from Nahal Hever (8HevXIIgr) (The Seiyal Collection I) (DJD VIII; Oxford: Clarendon, 1990).

8*. Revised edition of 8: The Greek Minor Prophets Scroll from Nahal Hever (8HevXIIgr) (The Seiyal Collection I) (DJD VIII; Oxford: Clarendon, "Reprinted with corrections 1995").

9. With the collaboration of S. J. Pfann: The Dead Sea Scrolls on Microfiche: A Comprehensive Facsimile Edition of the Texts from the Judean Desert, with a Companion Volume (Leiden: E.J. Brill/IDC, 1993).

9*. Revised edition of 9: Companion Volume to The Dead Sea Scrolls Microfiche Edition (2d rev. ed.; Leiden: E.J. Brill/IDC, 1995).

10. With C. Rabin and S. Talmon: The Hebrew University Bible, The Book of Jeremiah (Jerusalem: Magnes Press, 1997).

11. The Greek and Hebrew Bible – Collected Essays on the Septuagint (VTSup 72; Leiden/ Boston/Cologne: E.J. Brill, 1999).

11.* Unchanged paperback edition of The Greek and Hebrew Bible – Collected Essays on the Septuagint (Atlanta: Society of Biblical Literature, 2006).

12a. With D. W. Parry: The Dead Sea Scrolls Reader, Part 1, Texts Concerned with Religious Law (Leiden/Boston: E.J. Brill, 2004)

12b. With D. W. Parry: The Dead Sea Scrolls Reader, Part 2, Exegetical Texts (Leiden/ Boston: E.J. Brill, 2004).

12c. With D. W. Parry: The Dead Sea Scrolls Reader, Part 3, Parabiblical Texts (Leiden/ Boston: E.J. Brill, 2005).

12d. With D. W. Parry: The Dead Sea Scrolls Reader, Part 4, Calendrical and Sapiential Texts (Leiden/Boston: E.J. Brill, 2004).

12e. With D. W. Parry: The Dead Sea Scrolls Reader, Part 5, Poetic and Liturgical Texts (Leiden/Boston: E.J. Brill, 2005).

12f. With D. W. Parry: The Dead Sea Scrolls Reader, Part 6, Additional Genres and Unclassified Texts (Leiden/Boston: E.J. Brill, 2005).

12*. With D.W. Parry, and in association with G.I. Clements: The Dead Sea Scrolls Reader, Volumes 1–2 (2nd edition, revised and expanded; Leiden: Brill, 2014).

13. Scribal Practices and Approaches Reflected in the Texts Found in the Judean Desert (STDJ 54; Leiden/Boston: E.J. Brill, 2004).

14. Hebrew Bible, Greek Bible, and Qumran – Collected Essays (TSAJ 121; Tübingen: Mohr Siebeck, 2008).

15. Revised Lists of the Texts from the Judaean Desert (Leiden/Boston: Brill, 2010).

16. Textual Criticism of the Hebrew Bible, Qumran, Septuagint: Collected Writings, Volume 3 (VTSup 167; Leiden: Brill, 2015).

17. Textual Developments, Collected Essays, Volume 4, VTSup 181 (Leiden: Brill, 2019).

18. Studies in Textual Criticism: Collected Essays, Volume 5, VTSup 197 (Leiden: Brill, 2024).

== Electronic publications ==
1. The Dead Sea Scrolls Database (Non-Biblical Texts) (The Dead Sea Scrolls Electronic Reference Library, vol. 2; Prepared by the Foundation for Ancient Research and Mormon Studies [FARMS]) (Leiden: E.J. Brill, 1999).

2. In collaboration with A. Groves: The Hebrew text in ˚nt, JPS Hebrew–English Tanakh: The Traditional Hebrew Text and the New JPS Translation (2d. ed.; Philadelphia: The Jewish Publication Society, 1999).

3. The Parallel Aligned Text of the Greek and Hebrew Bible (division of the CATSS database, directed by R. A. Kraft and E. Tov), module in the Accordance computer program, 2002 (with updates 2003–).

3a. The Parallel Aligned Text of the Greek and Hebrew Bible (division of the CATSS database, directed by R. A. Kraft and E. Tov), module in the Logos computer program, 2004 (with updates, 2005–).

3b. With F. H. Polak: The Parallel Aligned Text of the Greek and Hebrew Bible (division of the CATSS database, directed by R. A. Kraft and E. Tov), module in the Bible Works computer program, version 7, 2005 (with updates, 2006–).

4. "Electronic Resources Relevant to the Textual Criticism of Hebrew Scripture," TC: A Journal of Biblical Textual Criticism 8 (2003)

5. The Dead Sea Scrolls Electronic Library, Brigham Young University, Revised Edition 2006, part of the Dead Sea Scrolls Electronic Reference Library of E.J. Brill Publishers (Leiden: E.J. Brill, 2006). https://brill.com/view/db/dsno?rskey=YpVhkL&result=1

6. "Electronic Tools for the Textual Criticism of the Hebrew Bible – 2013 Introduction and List"

7. "Electronic Bible Editions on the Internet (2014)"

8. "The (Proto-)Masoretic Text: A Ten-Part Series," http://thetorah.com/proto-masoretic-text/ = article 325 (2017).

== Books edited ==
1. The Hebrew and Greek Texts of Samuel, 1980 Proceedings IOSCS, Vienna (Jerusalem: Academon, 1980).

2. A Classified Bibliography of Lexical and Grammatical Studies on the Language of the Septuagint and Its Revisions (3rd ed.; Jerusalem: Academon, 1982).

3. With C. Rabin: Textus, Studies of the Hebrew University Bible Project, vol. 11 (Jerusalem: Magnes Press, 1984).

4. Textus, Studies of the Hebrew University Bible Project, vol. 12 (Jerusalem: Magnes Press, 1985).

5. Textus, Studies of the Hebrew University Bible Project, vol. 13 (Jerusalem: Magnes Press, 1986).

6. With M. Klopfenstein, U. Luz, and S. Talmon: Mitte der Schrift? Ein jüdisch–christliches Gespräch. Texte der Berner Symposions 1985 (Judaica et Christiana 11; Bern: Peter Lang, 1987).

7. Textus, Studies of the Hebrew University Bible Project, vol. 14 (Jerusalem: Magnes Press, 1988). 183 pp.

8. Textus, Studies of the Hebrew University Bible Project, vol. 15 (Jerusalem: Magnes Press, 1990).

9. With M. Fishbane and with the assistance of W. Fields: "Sha’arei Talmon": Studies in the Bible, Qumran, and the Ancient Near East Presented to Shemaryahu Talmon (Winona Lake, IN: Eisenbrauns, 1992).

10. With A. Hurvitz and S. Japhet: I. L. Seeligmann, Studies in Biblical Literature (Heb.; Jerusalem: Magnes Press, 1992).

10*. With A. Hurvitz and S. Japhet: I. L. Seeligmann, Studies in Biblical Literature (Heb.; 2d rev. ed.; Jerusalem: Magnes Press, 1996).

11. Max L. Margolis, The Book of Joshua in Greek, Part V: Joshua 19:39–24:33 (Monograph Series, Annenberg Research Institute; Philadelphia 1992).

12. J. Jarick with the collaboration of G. Marquis, A Comprehensive Bilingual Concordance of the Hebrew and Greek Texts of the Book of Ecclesiastes (CATSS: Basic Tools Volume 3; SCS 36; Atlanta, GA: Scholars Press, 1993).

13. Area editor (Dead Sea Scrolls) in The Oxford Dictionary of the Jewish Religion (ed. R. J. Z. Werblowsky and G. Wigoder; New York/Oxford: Oxford University Press, 1997).

14. Area editor in Encyclopedia of the Dead Sea Scrolls, vols. 1–2 (ed. L. H. Schiffman and J. C. VanderKam; Oxford/New York: Oxford University Press, 2000).

15. With L. H. Schiffman and J. VanderKam: The Dead Sea Scrolls: Fifty Years After Their Discovery – Proceedings of the Jerusalem Congress, July 20–25, 1997 (Jerusalem: Israel Exploration Society/The Shrine of the Book, Israel Museum, 2000).

16. F. H. Polak and G. Marquis, A Classified Index of the Minuses of the Septuagint, Part I: Introduction; Part II: The Pentateuch (CATSS Basic Tools 4, 5; Stellenbosch: Print24.com, 2002).

17. With E. D. Herbert: The Bible as Book – The Hebrew Bible and the Judaean Desert Discoveries (London: British Library & Oak Knoll Press in association with The Scriptorium: Center for Christian Antiquities, 2002).

18. With P. W. Flint and J. VanderKam: Studies in the Hebrew Bible, Qumran and the Septuagint Presented to Eugene Ulrich (VTSup 101; Leiden: E.J. Brill, 2006).

19. With M. Bar-Asher: Meghillot, Studies in the Dead Sea Scrolls V–VI, A Festschrift for Devorah Dimant (Haifa/Jerusalem: University of Haifa, The Publication Project of the Qumran Scrolls/The Bialik Institute, 2007).

20. With M. Bar-Asher, D. Rom-Shiloni, and N. Wazana: Shai le-Sara Japhet (Jerusalem: Bialik Institute, 2007).

21. With C. A. Evans: Exploring the Origins of the Bible – Canon Formation in Historical, Literary, and Theological Perspective (Grand Rapids, MI: Baker Academic, 2008).

22. With A. Lange, M. Weigold, and B.H. Reynolds III: The Dead Sea Scrolls in Context: Integrating the Dead Sea Scrolls in the Study of Ancient Texts, Languages, and Cultures, Vols. I–II (VTSup 140/I–II; Leiden/Boston: Brill, 2011)

23. With Armin Lange, Textual History of the Bible, The Hebrew Bible, Vol. 1A, Overview Articles (Leiden: Brill, 2016).

24. With Armin Lange, Textual History of the Bible, The Hebrew Bible, Vol. 1B, Pentateuch, Former and Latter Prophets (Leiden: Brill, 2017).

25. With Armin Lange, Textual History of the Bible, The Hebrew Bible, Vol. 1C, Pentateuch, Former and Latter Prophets (Leiden: Brill, 2017).

26. With Kipp Davis and Robert Duke, Dead Sea Scrolls in the Museum Collection, Publications of Museum of the Bible 1, ed. Michael W. Holmes; Semitic Texts Series, ed. Emanuel Tov; managing ed. Jerry A. Pattengale (Leiden: Brill, 2016).

27. Textus, A Journal on Textual Criticism of the Hebrew Bible, Vol. 27 (Leiden: Brill, 2018).

28. Textus, A Journal on Textual Criticism of the Hebrew Bible, Vol. 28 (Leiden: Brill, 2019).

29. Textus, A Journal on Textual Criticism of the Hebrew Bible, Vol. 29.1 (Leiden: Brill, 2020).

30. With Gershom Qiprisçi as consulting editor: Biblia Hebraica Petropolitana, The Pentateuch and the Davidic Psalter, A Synoptic Edition of Hebrew Biblical Texts: The Masoretic Text, The Samaritan Pentateuch, the Dead Sea Scrolls, Vols. 1–6, Manuscripta Orientalia, Supplement Series 1 (St. Petersburg/Leiden: 2020), with introductions by Emanuel Tov in English and Russian.

31. Textus, A Journal on Textual Criticism of the Hebrew Bible, Vol. 29.2 (Leiden: Brill, 2020).

32. Textus, A Journal on Textual Criticism of the Hebrew Bible, Vol. 30.1-2 (Leiden: Brill, 2021).

33. Textus, A Journal on Textual Criticism of the Hebrew Bible, Vol. 31.1-2 (Leiden: Brill, 2022).

=== Editor-in-chief, Discoveries in the Judaean Desert ===
1. P. W. Skehan, E. Ulrich, and J. E. Sanderson, Qumran Cave 4.IV: Palaeo-Hebrew and Greek Biblical Manuscripts (DJD IX; Oxford: Clarendon, 1992).
2. E. Qimron and J. Strugnell, Qumran Cave 4.V: Miqsat Ma’ase ha-Torah (DJD X; Oxford: Clarendon, 1994).
3. E. Eshel et al., in consultation with J. VanderKam and M. Brady, Qumran Cave 4.VI: Poetical and Liturgical Texts, Part 1 (DJD XI; Oxford: Clarendon, 1998).
4. E. Ulrich and F. M. Cross, eds., Qumran Cave 4.VII: Genesis to Numbers (DJD XII; Oxford: Clarendon, 1994 [repr. 1999]).
5. H. Attridge et al., in consultation with J. VanderKam, Qumran Cave 4.VIII: Parabiblical Texts, Part 1 (DJD XIII; Oxford: Clarendon, 1994).
6. E. Ulrich and F. M. Cross, eds., Qumran Cave 4.IX: Deuteronomy, Joshua, Judges, Kings (DJD XIV; Oxford: Clarendon, 1995 [repr. 1999]).
7. E. Ulrich et al., Qumran Cave 4.X: The Prophets (DJD XV; Oxford: Clarendon, 1997).
8. E. Ulrich et al., Qumran Cave 4.XI: Psalms to Chronicles (DJD XVI; Oxford: Clarendon, 2000).
9. F. M. Cross, D. W. Parry, R. Saley, E. Ulrich, Qumran Cave 4.XII: 1–2 Samuel (DJD XVII; Oxford: Clarendon, 2005).
10. J. M. Baumgarten, Qumran Cave 4.XIII: The Damascus Document (4Q266–273) (DJD XVIII; Oxford: Clarendon, 1996).
11. M. Broshi et al., in consultation with J. VanderKam, Qumran Cave 4.XIV: Parabiblical Texts, Part 2 (DJD XIX; Oxford: Clarendon, 1995).
12. T. Elgvin et al., in consultation with J. A. Fitzmyer, S.J., Qumran Cave 4.XV: Sapiential Texts, Part 1 (DJD XX; Oxford: Clarendon, 1997).
13. S. Talmon, J. Ben-Dov, and U. Glessmer, Qumran Cave 4.XVI: Calendrical Texts (DJD XXI; Oxford: Clarendon, 2001).
14. G. Brooke et al., in consultation with J. VanderKam, Qumran Cave 4.XVII: Parabiblical Texts, Part 3 (DJD XXII; Oxford: Clarendon, 1996).
15. F. García Martínez, E. J. C. Tigchelaar, and A. S. van der Woude, Qumran Cave 11.II: 11Q2–18, 11Q20–31 (DJD XXIII; Oxford: Clarendon, 1998).
16. M. J. W. Leith, Wadi Daliyeh I: The Wadi Daliyeh Seal Impressions (DJD XXIV; Oxford: Clarendon, 1997).
17. É. Puech, Qumran Cave 4.XVIII: Textes hébreux (4Q521–4Q528, 4Q576–4Q579) (DJD XXV; Oxford: Clarendon, 1998).
18. P. Alexander and G. Vermes, Qumran Cave 4.XIX: 4QSerekh Ha-Yah≥ad and Two Related Texts (DJD XXVI; Oxford: Clarendon, 1998).
19. H. M. Cotton and A. Yardeni, Aramaic, Hebrew, and Greek Documentary Texts from Nah≥al H≥ever and Other Sites, with an Appendix Containing Alleged Qumran Texts (The Seiyâl Collection II) (DJD XXVII; Oxford: Clarendon, 1997).
20. D. M. Gropp, Wadi Daliyeh II: The Samaria Papyri from Wadi Daliyeh; E. Schuller et al., in consultation with J. VanderKam and M. Brady, Qumran Cave 4.XXVIII: Miscellanea, Part 2 (DJD XXVIII; Oxford: Clarendon, 2001).
21. E. Chazon et al., in consultation with J. VanderKam and M. Brady, Qumran Cave 4.XX: Poetical and Liturgical Texts, Part 2 (DJD XXIX; Oxford: Clarendon, 1999).
22. D. Dimant, Qumran Cave 4.XXI: Parabiblical Texts, Part 4: Pseudo-Prophetic Texts (DJD XXX; Oxford: Clarendon, 2001).
23. É. Puech, Qumran Cave 4.XXII: Textes araméens, première partie: 4Q529–549 (DJD XXXI; Oxford: Clarendon, 2001).
24. D. Pike and A. Skinner, in consultation with J. VanderKam and M. Brady, Qumran Cave 4.XXIII: Unidentified Fragments (DJD XXXIII; Oxford: Clarendon, 2001).
25. J. Strugnell, D. J. Harrington, S.J., and T. Elgvin, in consultation with J. A. Fitzmyer, S.J., Qumran Cave 4.XXIV: 4QInstruction (Musar leMevîn): 4Q415 ff. (DJD XXXIV; Oxford: Clarendon, 1999).
26. J. Baumgarten et al., Qumran Cave 4.XXV: Halakhic Texts (DJD XXXV; Oxford: Clarendon, 1999).
27. S. J. Pfann, Cryptic Texts; P. Alexander et al., in consultation with J. VanderKam and M. Brady, Qumran Cave 4.XXVI: Miscellanea, Part 1 (DJD XXXVI; Oxford: Clarendon, 2000).
28. H. Cotton et al., in consultation with J. VanderKam and M. Brady, Miscellaneous Texts from the Judaean Desert (DJD XXXVIII; Oxford: Clarendon, 2000).
29. E. Tov (ed.), The Texts from the Judaean Desert: Indices and an Introduction to the Discoveries in the Judaean Desert Series (DJD XXXIX; Oxford: Clarendon, 2002).
30. M. G. Abegg, Jr., with J. E. Bowley and E. M. Cook, in consultation with E. Tov, The Dead Sea Scrolls Concordance I. The Non-Biblical Texts from Qumran (Leiden: E.J. Brill, 2003).
31. H. Stegemann with E. Schuller, and C. Newsom (translations), Qumran Cave 1.III: 1QHodayota with Incorporation of 1QHodayotb and 4QHodayota–f (DJD XL; Oxford: Clarendon, 2009).
32. É. Puech, Qumran Cave 4.XXVII: Textes araméens, deuxième partie: 4Q550–575a, 580–587 et Appendices (DJD XXXVII; Oxford: Clarendon, 2009).
33. E. Ulrich and P. W. Flint, Qumran Cave 1.II: The Isaiah Scrolls (DJD XXXII; Oxford: Clarendon, 2010).

== See also ==
- List of Israel Prize recipients
