= Tamil loanwords in Hebrew =

The importance of Tamil loanwords in Hebrew lies in the fact that these words are the earliest recorded attestation of the Tamil language. At some point before 500 BCE, they were incorporated into the various writings of the Hebrew Bible. Although a number of authors have identified many biblical and post-biblical words originating from Old Tamil or the Dravidian languages in general, a number of them have competing etymologies, and some Tamil derivations are considered controversial. It is believed that Tamil's linguistic interaction with Biblical Hebrew, which belongs to the Afroasiatic languages, occurred amidst the wider international exchange of goods and ideas (e.g., the ancient spice trade) between merchants travelling throughout Eurasia via the Silk Road.

== Origins ==
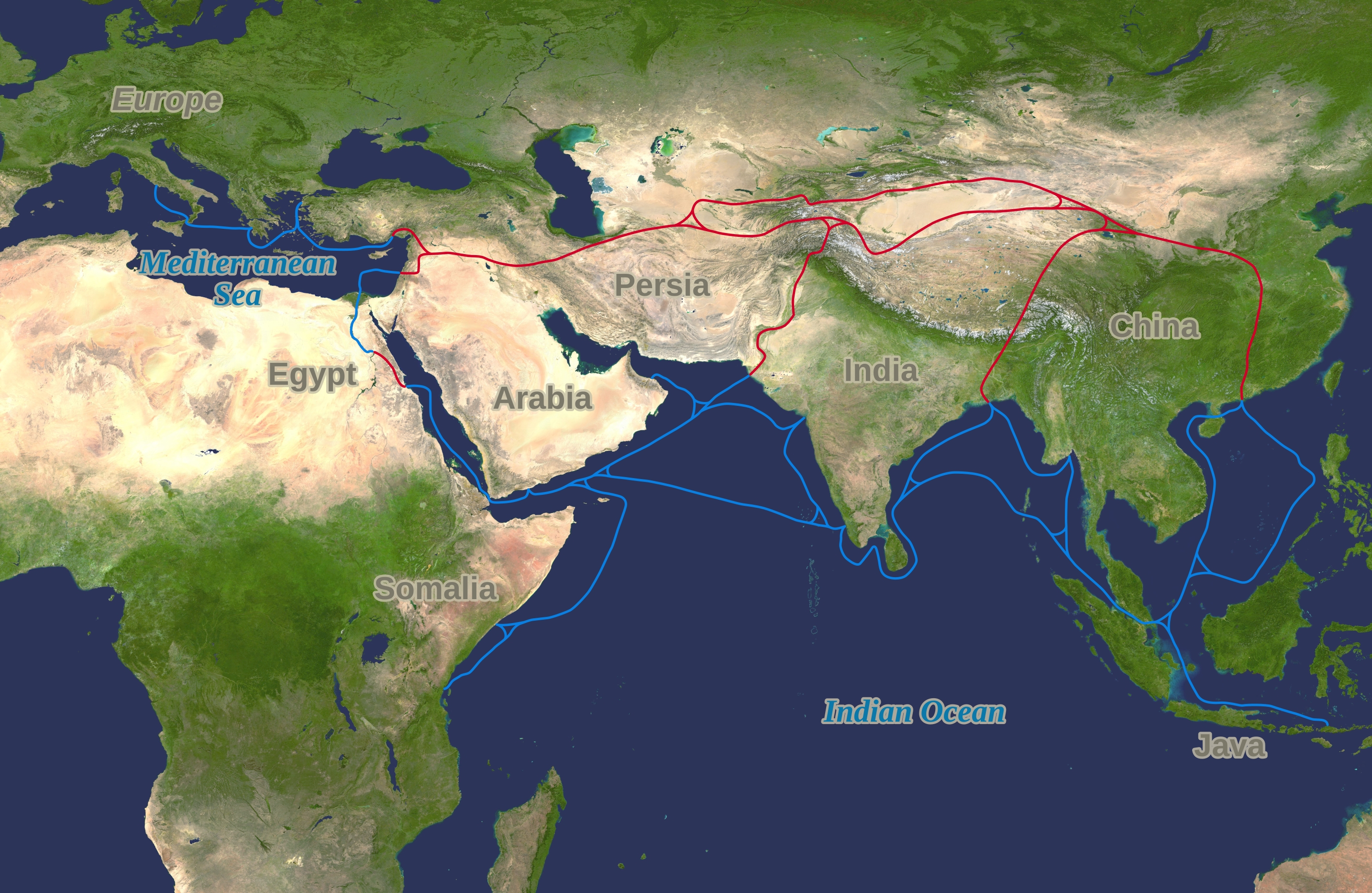
Land (red) and sea (blue) routes of the ancient spice trade and the Silk Road, which prompted extensive socio-cultural and economic intermingling between the civilizations of China, India, the Near East, and Mediterranean Europe.

The incorporation of Tamil loanwords into the Hebrew language originally came about through the interactions of merchants from the Levant and South India. The mainstream view is that the beginnings of trade between the Mediterranean Basin and South India can be traced back to 500 BCE, when the word zingiberis (ζιγγίβερις), which was derived from the Old Tamil *cinki-ver (சிங்கிவேர்) (for "ginger"), first appeared in Ancient Greek. This indicates South Indians possibly having been involved in trade with the various Mediterranean civilizations centuries earlier. There is some evidence that trade between Greater India and the peoples inhabiting the Mediterranean may have been well established by 1500 BCE.

Due to its native speakers' location—in the critical path of trade between Egypt, Mesopotamia, and India—ancient Hebrew lexicon contains both cultural words that are common to many languages in the general area and loanwords from other languages, including Greek. Some of these loanwords are present in the earliest transcripts of the Hebrew Bible from ancient Israel and Judah. By the mid-19th century, Christian missionaries trained in Biblical Hebrew noticed that there were words of Indian origin (Indo-Aryan and Dravidian) in biblical texts, including from the Tamil language. Some of the loanwords were borrowed directly from Old Tamil into Biblical Hebrew. Others were borrowed via Akkadian, Aramaic, Greek, Persian, and the South Arabian languages. The period of these lexiconic borrowings range from 1000 BCE to 500 BCE. The dating of this borrowing depends on the acceptable ranges of dates for the compilation and redaction of the Books of Kings.

== Linguistic influences ==
Most of the borrowed words had to do with items of trade that were unique to South India and thus lacked native names in Hebrew. According to Israeli linguists Chaim Menachem Rabin and Abraham Mariaselvam, the Tamil linguistic impact in Hebrew goes beyond just loanwords. The two languages' contact also influenced their poetic traditions and styles, such as those found in the Hebrew Song of Songs, which, according to Rabin and Mariaselvam, shows the influence of Cankam anthologies.

In addition to serving as the earliest attestation of the Tamil language, Hebrew's Tamil loanwords are also an early attestation of the Dravidian languages, to which Tamil belongs. This was before Tamil was widely written, using the Tamil-Brahmi script and dated variously from 600 BCE to 200 BCE. Although a number of authors have identified many biblical and post-biblical words of Tamil, Old Tamil, or Dravidian origin, a number of them have competing etymologies and some Tamil derivations are considered controversial and disputed. There is also a class of words that were borrowed ultimately from the Indo-Aryan languages, which are spoken in North India, but transmitted via Tamil.

=== In the Hebrew Bible ===
Known biblical Tamil loanwords
| Hebrew word | Meaning in Hebrew | Source language | Tamil word | Meaning in Tamil |
|---|---|---|---|---|
| túkim תוכים | parrots but meant peacocks in the past (Note: According to David Dean Shulman túki in modern Hebrew is translated as Parrots but in past meant Peacocks, taken from tōkai signifying a male Peacocks feathers in Tamil) | Tamil (Note: According Ernest Klein Greek taôs, Aramaic טוסא, Arabic لطاووس, also Hebrew תכי probably comes ultimately from Tamil tōkai/தோகை for peacock.) | tōkai தோகை | feather |
| ahalim אֲהָלִים | eagle-wood or agarwood | Tamil (Note: David Shulman believes ahalim is directly derived from Tamil akil/அகில் rather than Sanskrit aguru/अगुरु which in itself is a loan from Tamil.) | akil அகில் | agarwood |
| kurkúm כורכום | turmeric | probably Tamil but also possibly Sanskrit | kūkai கூகை (கூவை) | turmeric |
| armón ארמון | palace | probably Tamil but has competing etymologies | araṇmaṉai அரண்மனை | palace |
| kaḏ כד | jug | probably Tamil, cognates in South Dravidian languages (Note: According to Podolsky, objects of trade travel together with their names, and cites Greek κάδος, along with Proto-Indonesian, Batak, Javanese and Malay forms as examples of loanwords borrowed for a new form of jug due to early maritime contact with South India.) | kiṇṭi கிண்டி | small vessel |
| rg ריג | weave | probably Tamil, cognates in South Dravidian languages | orukku ஒருக்கு | to draw out |
| minnith מִנִּית | rice (Note: minnith in general means a place of the Ammonites except Chaim Rabin postulated, it meant Rice.) | Tamil via Akkadian | uṇṭi உண்டி | boiled rice |
| pannag פנג | millet (Note: pannag has no acceptable meaning, but millet is one of the proposed meanings.) | Tamil via South Arabian | uṇaṅkal உணங்கல் | millet |
| bûts בּוּץ | fine textile | Possibly related to Tamil, via South Arabian also possibly via Sanskrit. Already attested in Syrian and Akkadian inscriptions dating back to the 9th century BCE. | panjcu பஞ்சு | cotton |
| mesukkan מסכן | wood | Tamil via Akkadian | mucukkaṭṭai முசுக்கட்டை | mulberry tree |
| piṭdâh פִטְדָה | topaz | Tamil or Dravidian | pitta பித்த | bile or yellow |
| qôph קוף | monkey | probably Tamil but also possibly Sanskrit | ka(p)vi கவி | monkey |

== Post-biblical period ==
| Hebrew word | Meaning in Hebrew | Source language | Tamil word | Meaning in Tamil |
|---|---|---|---|---|
| etrog אתרוג | yellow citron | Tamil via Persian (Note: According Rabin, Hebrew etrog or ethrunga is borrowed from turung in Persian or etrunga in Mandaic, that is ultimately related to mātuḷam/மாதுளம் or mātuḷamkāy/மாதுளம்காய் in Tamil for Pomegranate or lemon, where as Philologos derives it from Tamil Nāṟṟaṅkāy/நாற்றங்காய்) | mātuḷam மாதுளம், or alternatively, nārttaṅkāy நார்த்தங்காய் | pomegranate or citron |
| orez אורז | rice | Tamil via South Arabian (Note: According Chaim Rabin Greek óruza (ὄρυζα), Hebrew אורז are derived from South Arabian areez that was ultimately derived from Tamil arici/அரிசி for rice) | arici அரிசி | rice |
| nul נול | loom | probably Tamil, cognates in South Dravidian languages (Note: The Hebrew word for weavers loom nul is generally accepted to be derived from the Aramaic nawlā per Ernest Klein, which is related to Arabic نَوْل, but Podolsky believes its highly improbable that the original word is preserved only in one language without cognates in other Semitic languages apart from those that were borrowed from it. He believes its related to the acquisition of a new weaving technology from South India.) | nūl நூல் | thread |
| mango מנגו | mango | From English, via Portuguese originally from Tamil | māṅkāy மாங்காய் | unripe mā (a species) fruit |

== See also ==
- Tamil loanwords in other languages
  - Tamil loanwords in Ancient Greek
- Indo-Mesopotamia relations
  - Meluhha § Trade with Sumer, most likely an Indian trading partner of Mesopotamia's Sumerian civilization
- Indian maritime history
  - Indo-Roman trade relations

== Cited literature ==
- Caldwell, Robert (1856). A Comparative Grammar of the Dravidian, Or South-Indian Family of Languages. Harrison. ISBN 978-81-20-60117-8.
- Chandra, Moti (1977). Trade And Trade Routes In Ancient India. Abhinav. ISBN 978-0-712-80117-1.
- Dishitar, Ramachandra (1971), Origin And Spread Of The Tamils, Oakley, ISBN 978-3-111-59200-8
- James, Gregory (2008), Tamil lexicography, Walter de Gruyter, ISBN 978-1-443-72658-0
- Khan, Geoffrey, ed. (2013). Encyclopedia of Hebrew Languages and Linguistics Volume 1 A-F. Brill. ISBN 978-90-04-17642-3.
- The cilappatikāram of Iḷaṅko Aṭikaḷ : an epic of South India. Translated by Parthasarathy, R. Columbia University Press. 1993. ISBN 978-02-31-07849-8.
- Pdodolsky, Baruch (1998). Izre'el, Shlomo; Singer, Itmamar; Zadok, Ran (eds.). Past links:Studies in the Languages and Cultures of the Ancient Near East. Eisenbrauns. ISBN 1-57506-035-3.
- Price, Edward (1982), A history of Kannada literature, Asian Educational Service, ISBN 8120600630
- Pugazhendhi, D (Sep 2021). "Tamil, Greek, Hebrew and Sanskrit:Sandalwood (Σανηαλόξςλ)and it's Semantics in Classical Literatures" (PDF). Athens Journal of Philology. 8 (3). ATINER (Athens Institute for Education and Research): 207–230.
- Shulman, David (2016), Tamil: A biography, Harvard University Press, ISBN 978-0-674-05992-4
- Sugirtharajah, R.S. (2013), The Bible and Asia, Harvard University Press, ISBN 978-0-674-04907-9
- Swamaninatha Aiyar, R (1987), Dravidian Theories, Motilal Banarsidass, ISBN 978-8-120-80331-2
- Rabin, Chaim (1994). Goodman, Hananya (ed.). Between Jerusalem and Benares. State University of New York. ISBN 0-7914-1715-8.
- Rabin, Chaim (Dec 1, 1973). "The Song of Songs and Tamil Poetry". Studies in Religion. 3 (3): 205–219. doi:10.1177/000842987300300301. S2CID 149367075.
- Rabin, Chaim (Oct 1971). Proceedings of the Second International Conference Seminar of Tamil Studies. International Association of Tamil Research. pp. 432–440.
- Southworth, Franklin (2005), Linguistic Archeology of South Asia, Routledge, ISBN 978-0-415-33323-8
- Waldman, Nahum (1989), The Recent Study of Hebrew: A Survey of the Literature with Selected Bibliography, Eisenbrauns, ISBN 978-0-878-20908-8
