= Shemaryahu Talmon =

Israeli biblical scholar (1920–2010)

- שמריהו טלמון
- Born: Zam Zelmanowicz; 1920; Skierniewice, Poland
- Died: December 15, 2010 (aged 89–90); Jerusalem
- Awards: Israel Prize

Academic background
- Education: Hebrew University of Jerusalem

Academic work
- Discipline: Biblical studies
- Institutions: Hebrew University of Jerusalem; University of Haifa
- Notable works: Hebrew University Bible Project

Shemaryahu Talmon (Hebrew: שמריהו טלמון; born Zam Zelmanowicz; 1920 in Skierniewice, Poland – December 15, 2010) was J. L. Magnes Professor of Bible at the Hebrew University of Jerusalem, known particularly for his work in the Hebrew University Bible Project.

A Holocaust survivor from Buchenwald concentration camp, Talmon immigrated to Mandatory Palestine and became a prominent biblical scholar, contributing significantly to the study of the Dead Sea Scrolls and the textual criticism of the Hebrew Bible. He was a leader in interfaith dialogue and served as rector of the University of Haifa. In 1997, Talmon was awarded the Israel Prize for Biblical studies.

== Early life ==
Talmon was born in Poland in 1920, growing up and studying in the city of Breslau (which was then part of Prussia). He was educated at the Jüdisches Reform-Real Gymnasium in Breslau, Germany. He was a detainee at Buchenwald concentration camp during the Holocaust. During that time his parents and two sisters were killed, he managed to emigrate to Palestine.

=== Education ===
He obtained a PhD from the Hebrew University of Jerusalem in 1956. His thesis was on the text and versions of the Tanakh, especially "double meanings" in Biblical texts. He subsequently extended and refined his thesis, and contributed to many areas of biblical study.

== Religious work ==
He worked with Moshe Goshen-Gottstein and Chaim Rabin on the Hebrew University Bible Project, and after their deaths served as its editor in chief. His work helped to advance the understanding of the biblical text, especially the Dead Sea Scrolls. He combined his interest in the scrolls and sociology to study the nature and history of the "community of the renewed covenant."

In interfaith activities he was a leader in international Jewish-Christian dialogue, working with the World Council of Churches and the Vatican. In the area of Biblical education, he was director for educational institutions in the Immigration Camps in Cyprus (1947–48). He taught at the major Israeli universities and been a visiting professor at many institutions throughout the world. He was the rector of the University of Haifa and of the Institute of Judaic Studies at the College of Jewish Studies at Heidelberg, dean of the Faculty of Humanities at the Hebrew University.

In December 2008, Talmon donated a library of 10,000 volumes, mostly in Biblical studies, to the Shalom Hartman Institute.

== Publications ==
His publications include "Qumran and the History of the Biblical Text" (1975), "King, Cult, and Calendar" (1986), "Gesellschaft und Literatur in der Hebräischen Bibel" (1988), "The World of Qumran from Within" (1989) and hundreds of articles in scholarly journals.

== Awards ==
In 1997, Talmon was awarded the Israel Prize, for Biblical studies.

== See also ==
- List of Israel Prize recipients
