= Katell Berthelot =

French historian of religion (born 1972)

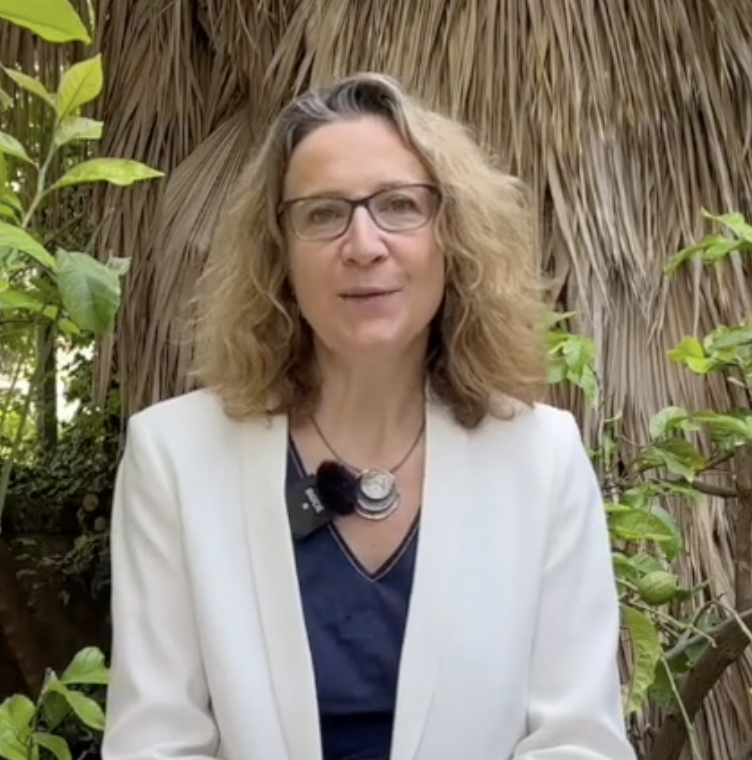
- Berthelot in 2022
- Born: 13 February 1972 (age 54); Paris, France
- Education: HEC Paris; Paris IV University; Hebrew University of Jerusalem
- Occupation: Historian of religion

Katell Berthelot (French: [katɛl bɛʁtəlo]; born in Paris, 13 February 1972) is a French historian of religion, specializing in ancient Judaism and comparative study of Abrahamic religions. She is a director of research at the National Center for Scientific Research (CNRS) and is attached to the Paul-Albert February Center at the Maison Méditerranéenne des Sciences de l'homme (MMSH) in Aix-en-Provence. She won the Irène Joliot-Curie Prize in 2008 in the Young Female Scientist category.

== Life and work ==
Berthelot graduated from HEC Paris in 1993, where she earned her master's degree in literature. She changed the course of her career in the 1990s after traveling to Israel for two years and studying the Dead Sea Scrolls, among the newly discovered texts of the Hebrew Bible. Her education included the history of religion at Paris Sorbonne-Paris IV University, where she obtained a Diploma of Advanced Studies (DEA). She spent the following years at the Orion Center for Qumran Studies at the Hebrew University of Jerusalem. Her Sorbonne doctorate in 2001, directed by Mireille Hadas-Lebel, was on “Israel and Humanity in Jewish Thought in Hellenistic and Roman Times.” In 2002, Berthelot joined the CNRS, at the Center Paul-Albert Juillet in Aix-en-Provence as a researcher, and she was appointed a CNRS research director in October 2015.

Working with biblical manuscripts and their commentaries, her research covers the notion of humanism in ancient Greek philosophy and ancient Jewish thought, specifically the Jewish reading of the Biblical narrative on the conquest of Canaan by the Israelites or the universality of Jewish law.

Berthelot co-directed, with Thierry Legrand and André Paul, the bilingual edition of the Dead Sea Scrolls (Qumran) from 2006 to 2018 for the Cerf editions as well as God, an investigation, a work comparing the three major Abrahamic religions and their commonalities as well as what distinguishes them. From 2014 to 2019, Berthelot directed the research project "Judaism and Rome", funded by the ERC (European Council for Research).

In In Search of the Promised Land? The Hasmonean Dynasty Between Biblical Models and Hellenistic Diplomacy (2018), Berthelot challenged the widely held view that Hasmonean conquests were driven by a religious ambition to restore the biblical "Promised Land." Instead, she argued that biblical language served largely to legitimize Hasmonean rule politically, while the expansion itself under rulers such as John Hyrcanus and Alexander Jannaeus was shaped more by the decline of the Seleucid Kingdom and by Hellenistic-style statecraft than by Jewish scripture.

In Jews and Their Roman Rivals: Pagan Rome's Challenge to Israel (2021), Berthelot argued that the encounter between ancient Jews and Rome was categorically different from earlier Jewish experiences of empire, since Jews came to perceive Rome as structurally analogous to Israel itself, making it both threatening and worthy of emulation at once. She traced how Jewish writers first identified Rome with the Kittim of Genesis and Daniel, then with Babylon, and finally, in rabbinic literature, with Esau, Jacob's rival twin; in her view, this shift marked Rome's emergence as Israel's defining imperial counterpart. The book also examined how Jews responded to Roman military power, law, and citizenship, and Berthelot contends that rabbinic Jewish identity and legal culture developed through adaptation of, and resistance to, Roman models, an influence she argues predates and is largely independent of Rome's later Christianization.

== Selected awards and distinctions ==
- Prix Sophie-Barluet (2017)
- Prix Pierre-Lafue (2017)
- Irène Joliot-Curie Prize (2008)
- CNRS bronze medalist (2007)

== Selected works ==
- Berthelot, Katell (2017). In Search of the Promised Land? The Hasmonean Dynasty between Biblical Models and Hellenistic Diplomacy. Journal of Ancient Judaism: Supplements. Vol. 24. Vandenhoeck & Ruprecht Gmbh & Co. ISBN 978-3525552520.
- Berthelot, Katell (2021). Jews and Their Roman Rivals: Pagan Rome's Challenge to Israel. Princeton University Press. ISBN 9780691199290.
