= Benjamin Kedar-Kopfstein =

Israeli academic

- Born: Benjamin Kedar-Kopfstein; 1 August 1923
- Died: 2013 (aged 89–90)
- Education: Doctor of Philosophy
- Alma mater: Hebrew University of Jerusalem
- Occupation: Biblical scholar, Hebraist
- Employer: Heidelberg University of Jewish Studies (1984–1984); University of Haifa
- Position held: rector (1984–1984)

Benjamin Kedar-Kopfstein (1 August 1923 – 2013) was an Israeli professor emeritus and Chairman of the Department of Bible Studies at the University of Haifa. He was also a member of the academic staff of the Hebrew University Bible Project in charge of the Latin versions. Many of his articles on biblical philology have appeared in the Jewish Quarterly Review, Textus, Theologisches Wörterbuch zum Alten Testament, Zeitschrift für die Alttestamentliche Wissenschaft and in biblical encyclopedias.

== Biography ==
Kedar-Kopfstein was the youngest son of Felix Kopfstein, a lawyer in Seesen, Germany who died while fleeing from Nazi persecution. In 1939 he escaped to Palestine with the Youth Aliyah, and initially lived in the kibbutz. He later became a member of the Jewish Settlement Police, an elite force recruited by the Haganah.

=== Education ===
Kedar-Kopfstein attended Jewish secondary school in Berlin. He received his PhD from Hebrew University of Jerusalem in 1968 with his thesis The Vulgate as a translation: some semantic and syntactical aspects of Jerome's version of the Hebrew Bible.

=== Academic work ===
He was director of the Old Testament Seminary of the University of Haifa and the Chairman of its Department of Bible Studies. He was also a Research Associate for the Hebrew University Bible Project in charge of Latin Versions.

He is known for his contributions to the understanding of Old Testament language Semantics. His articles on biblical philology have appeared in biblical encyclopedias, The Jewish Quarterly Review, Hebrew University Bible Project, Zeitschrift für die Alttestamentliche Wissenschaft (Journal of Old Testament scholarship in German) and other Hebrew scholarship journals. In 1984, he was Acting Rector of the Center for Jewish Studies Heidelberg.

=== Honors ===
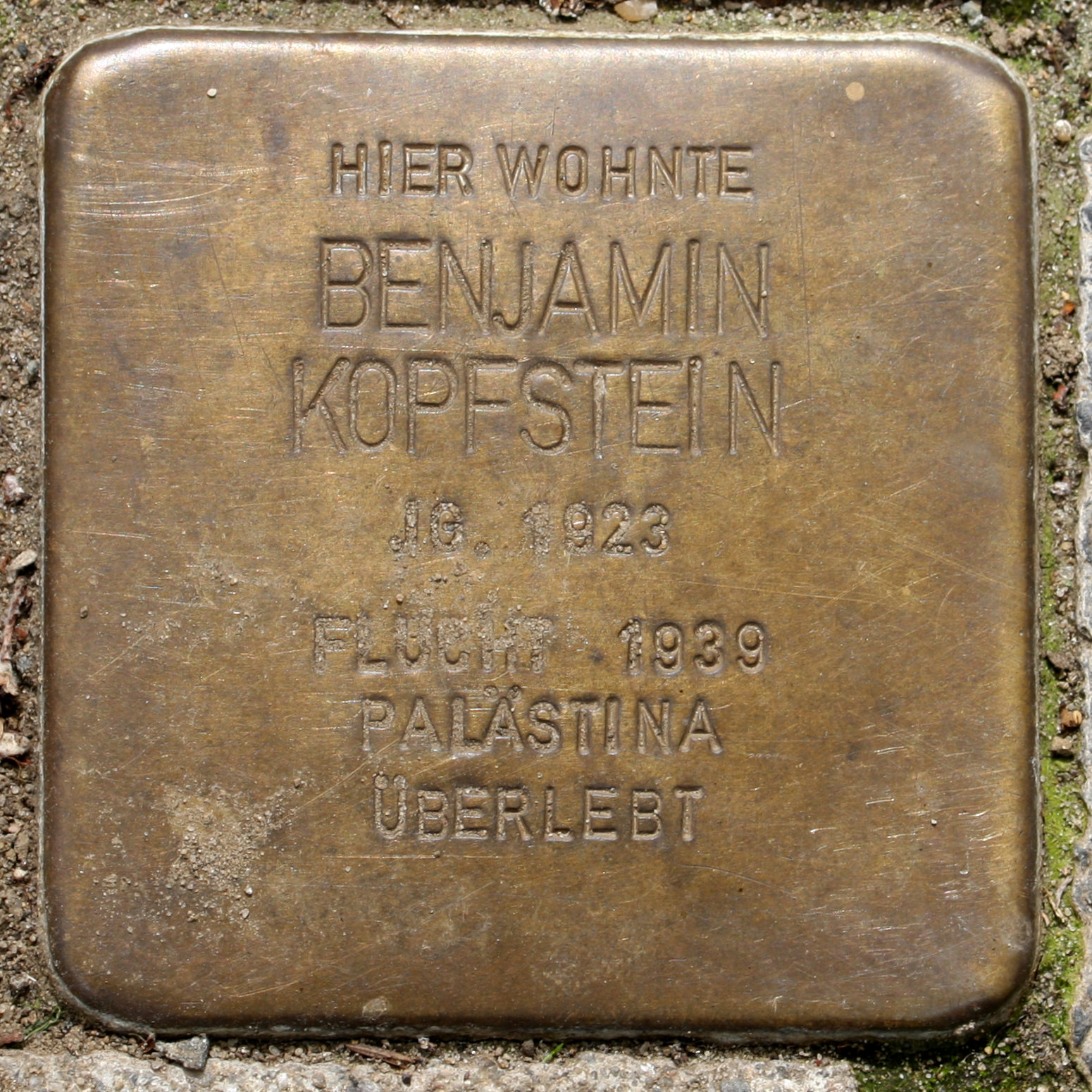
Commemorative plaque awarded to Benjamin Kedar-Kopfstein

The City of Braunschweig in Germany honored Doctor Kedar as part of its memorial stone project for victims of National Socialism.

== Works ==
=== Thesis ===
- Benjamin Kedar-Kopfstein (1968). The Vulgate as a translation: some semantic and syntactical aspects of Jerome's version of the Hebrew Bible (Hebrew University Thesis). OCLC 614667175.

=== Books ===
- 1978: Theological dictionary of the Old Testament (Contributor) pp. 234–249
- 1981: Biblical semantics: An introduction. (Biblische Semantik: Eine Einführung), Kohlhammer, 214 pages. (in German)
- 1994: The Aramaic Bible: Targums in their Historical Context (Contributor) pp. 420–430

== Selected articles ==
=== Hebrew University Bible Project ===
- A Note on Isaiah xiv, 31 Textus 2 (1962): 143–145
- Divergent Hebrew Readings in Jerome's Isaiah. Textus 4 (1964): 176–210.
- Textual Gleanings from the Vulgate to Jeremiah Textus 7 (1969): 36–58.
- The Interpretative Element in Transliteration Textus 8 (1973): 55–77.
- The Hebrew Text of Joel as Reflected in the Vulgate Textus Textus 9 (1981): 16–35

=== Other ===
- Etimologias populares. Enciclopedia de la Biblia 3 (1963): 247–251.
- The Vulgate as a Translation. Some Semantic and Syntactical Aspects of Jerome's Version of the Hebrew Bible, Phd. dissertation. Hebrew University of Jerusalem (1968).
- Textual Gleanings from the Vulgate to Hosea. The Jewish Quarterly Review 65.2 (1974): 73–97.
- Semantic Aspects of the pattern qôṭel, Haifa University (1977)
- The rooting qôṭel as a translation problem. Journal of Old Testament Scholarship (1981) (Zeitschrift für die Alttestamentliche Wissenschaft) (in German, English, and Biblical Hebrew). 93 (2): 254–279
- The Latin Translations. Mulder, MJ. Mikra: Text, Translation, Reading and Interpretation of the Hebrew Bible in Ancient Judaism and Early Christianity (1988): 299–338.
- The Textual Criticism of the Bible: An Introduction. Hebrew Studies 33.1 (1992): 170–172.
- The Interpretation of Rhetorical Questions. Fishbane, M & Tov, E with assistance of Fields, WW (eds) (1992).
- Paronomasia in Biblical Texts: Logical and Psy-chological Aspects. M. Bar Asher & al.(Eds.), Iyune mikra ufarshanut.(Biblical Studies and Exegesis) 3 (1993): 383–400.
- Jewish Traditions in the Writings of Jerome, Journal for the Study of the Old Testament (1994) pp. 420–420
- On the Decoding of Polysemantic Lexemes in Biblical Hebrew, Zeitschrift für Althebräistik (1994) pp. 17–25
- Biblical Hebrew and Discourse Linguistics. (1996): 136–138.
