= Moshe Goshen-Gottstein =

Israeli biblical scholar (1925–1991)

- משה גושן-גוטשטיין
- Born: September 6, 1925; Berlin, Prussia
- Died: September 14, 1991 (aged 66); Jerusalem, Israel
- Citizenship: Israel
- Occupations: Professor of Semitic linguistics and biblical philology
- Writing career
- Notable works: Medieval Hebrew Syntax and Vocabulary as Influenced by Arabic, Introduction to the Lexicography of Modern Hebrew, The Aleppo Codex
- Notable awards: Israel Prize (1988)

Moshe Goshen-Gottstein (Hebrew: משה גושן-גוטשטיין; 6 September 1925 – 14 September 1991) was a German-born professor of Semitic linguistics and biblical philology at the Hebrew University of Jerusalem, and director of the lexicographical institute and Biblical research institute of Bar-Ilan University.

== Biography ==
Moshe Goshen-Gottstein was born in Berlin. He immigrated to Palestine in 1939 to escape the Nazis, and studied at the Hebrew University of Jerusalem. He married Esther Hepner, a clinical psychologist, and had two sons, Alon (who is now director of the Elijah Interfaith Institute) and Yonatan. He was a resident of Talbiya, Jerusalem.

Esther Goshen-Gottstein wrote a book about her husband's recovery from a four-month coma in the wake of heart surgery, "Recalled to Life: The Story of a Coma."

== Academic career ==
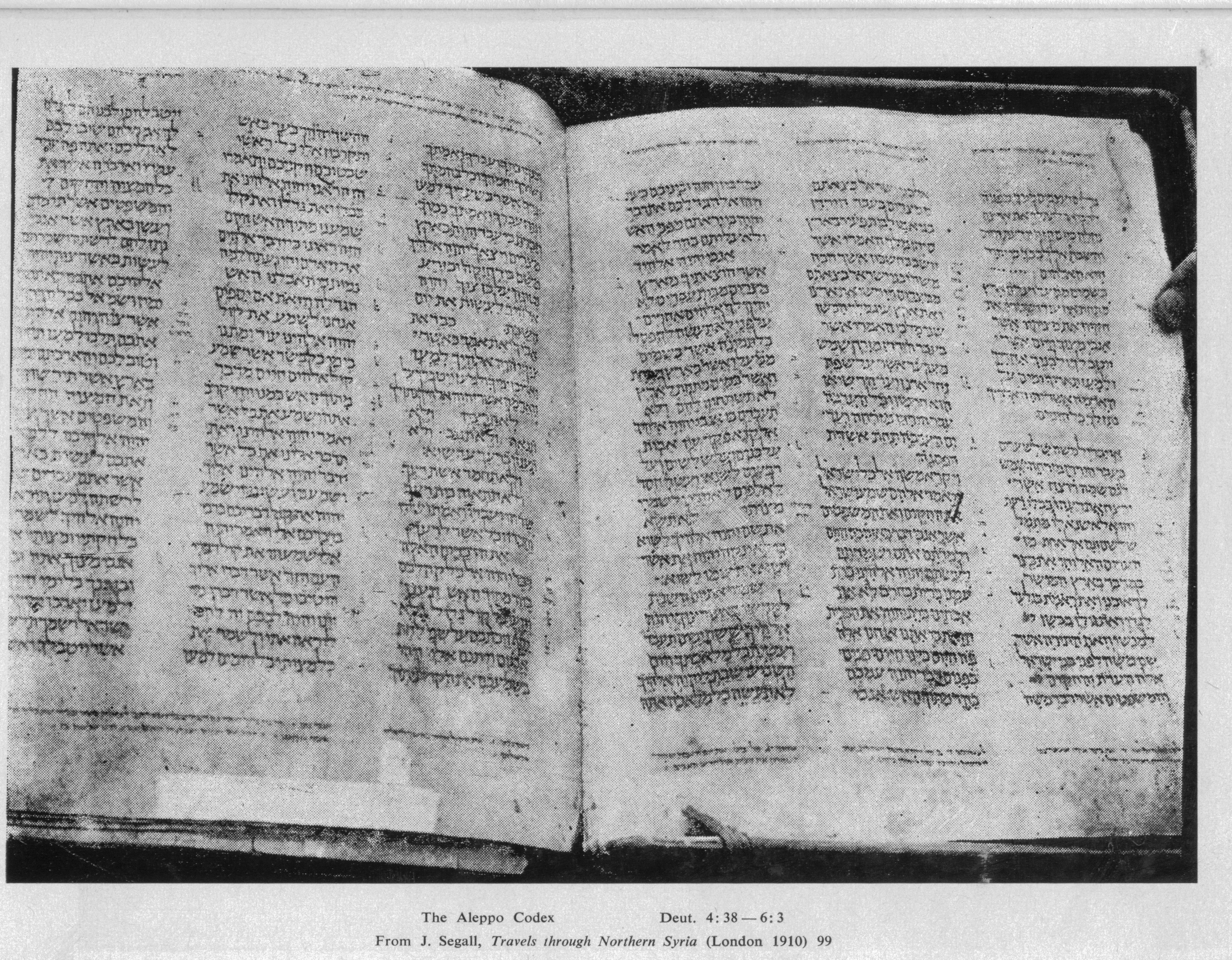
Pages of Aleppo Codex studied by Goshen-Gottstein

From 1950 on, Goshen-Gottstein taught at Hebrew University. He became a professor in 1967. Goshen-Gottstein made important contributions in the areas of Biblical studies, Hebrew linguistics and Semitic linguistics. His numerous articles and books included "Medieval Hebrew syntax and Vocabulary as Influenced by Arabic", "Introduction to the Lexicography of Modern Hebrew" and "The Aleppo Codex" (in which he established the authenticity of this codex). He worked on several dictionaries, among them the "Millon ha-Ivrit ha-Hadashah" ("Dictionary of Modern Hebrew"), the first synchronic dictionary of Hebrew. He was the founder of the Hebrew University Bible Project, which he directed for many years.

== Awards ==
In 1988, Goshen-Gottstein was awarded the Israel Prize in Jewish studies

== Journal publications ==
- Goshen-Gottstein, M. H. (1979). "The Aleppo Codex and the Rise of the Massoretic Bible Text". Near Eastern Archaeology. 42 (3): 145–163. doi:10.2307/3209386. JSTOR 3209386.

== See also ==
- List of Israel Prize recipients
