= Mireille Hadas-Lebel =

French historian and academic

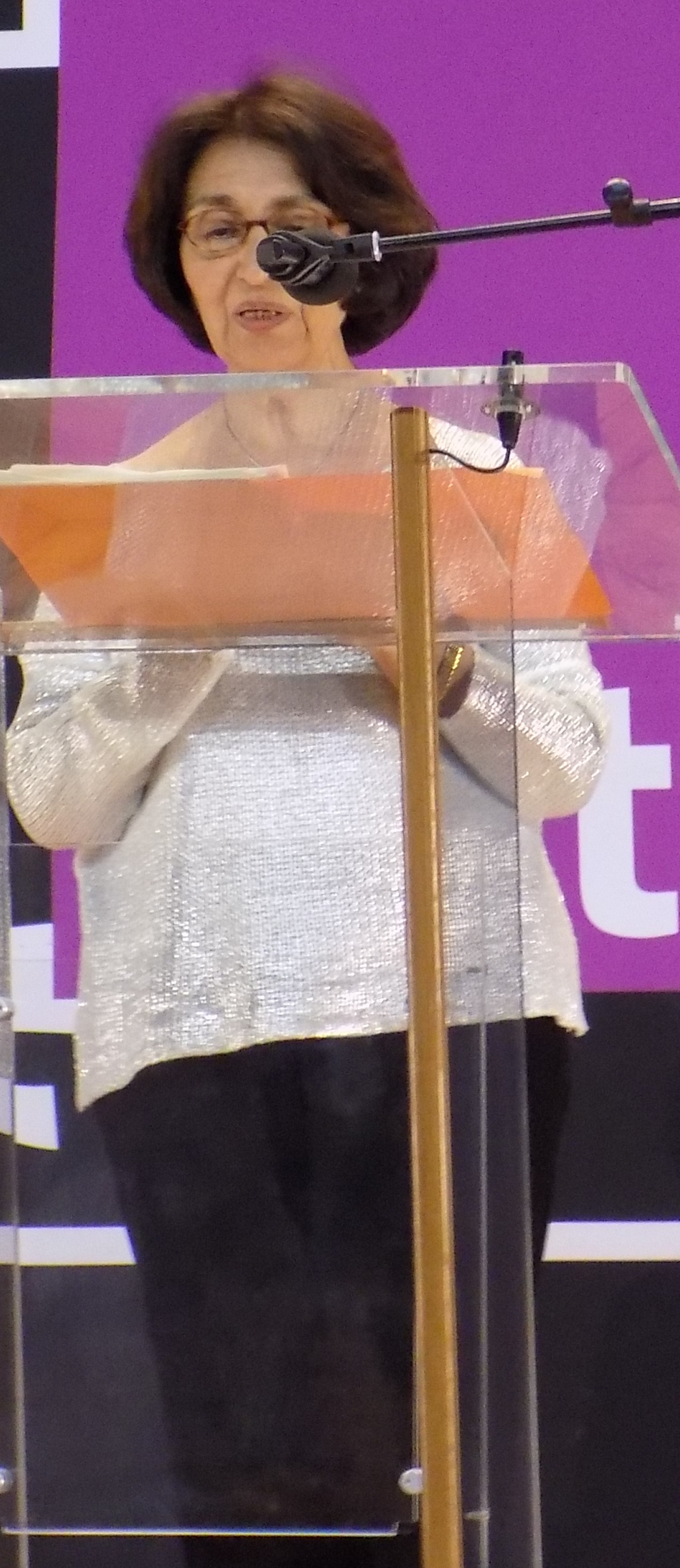
- Born: Mireille Bonan; 26 September 1940
- Education: Doctor of Philosophy
- Alma mater: Paris 1 Panthéon-Sorbonne University
- Occupation: Historian, university teacher
- Employer: Institut national des langues et civilisations orientales; Paris-Sorbonne University
- Awards: Chevalier of the Legion of Honour (2000)

Mireille Hadas-Lebel, (born Bonan on September 26, 1940, in Tunisia), is a French historian of Ancient history, specializing in the Jewish history.

== Biography ==
She was born on September 26, 1940, in Tunisia into a Jewish family of Livorno origin. Also vice-president of the Amitié judéo-chrétienne de France (AJCF), Mireille Hadas-Lebel is married to the senior civil servant Raphaël Hadas-Lebel. They have five children: Anne, wife Miller, senior civil servant; Jean; Hélène; Emmanuelle; Laure.

=== Education ===
She passed the entrance exam to the École normale supérieure de jeunes filles (class of 1960 Lettres). After obtaining an agrégation in grammar and a doctorate in ancient history.

=== Teaching ===
She became a professor at INALCO, where she headed the Hebrew Department for many years. Until her retirement, she taught the history of religions at the University of Paris-Sorbonne. Her course focuses on the history of Judaism in the ancient world and, more particularly, on the links of Judea with the Hellenic and Roman world, as well as on the importance of the Jewish diaspora through the study of texts by Greek and Roman authors and the Historical Books of the Bible.

She has directed doctoral candidates including Katell Berthelot who earned her degree in 2001.

=== Awards ===
- Legion of Honour
- Ordre national du Mérite
- Ordre des Palmes académiques

== Works ==
=== Thesis ===
- Hadas-Lebel, Mireille (1987). Jérusalem contre Rome (Texte remanié de: Thèse de doctorat--Lettres--Paris 1, 1987. Titre de soutenance: L'image de Rome dans la littérature juive d'époque hellénistique et romaine jusqu'au début du IVe siècle). OCLC 779750081.

=== Books ===
- Jérusalem contre Rome, Cerf, 1990
- L'hébreu: 3000 d'histoire, Albin Michel, 1992 ISBN 2-226-05865-6
- Massada, Albin Michel, 1995
- Le peuple hébreu: entre la Bible et l'Histoire, series. « Découvertes Gallimard / Histoire » (nº 313), Gallimard, 1997
- Flavius Josèphe, Fayard, 1989
- Philon d'Alexandrie, Fayard, 2003
- Hillel, un sage au temps de Jésus, Albin Michel, 2005
- Rome, la Judée et les Juifs, Picard, 2009
- Une histoire du Messie, Albin Michel, 2014
- Hérode, Fayard, 2017

=== Media ===
- De nombreux ouvrages pédagogiques (writings, cassettes or CD) to learn Hebrew, as well as a history of the Hebrew language.
