= Kedar Shah =

Indian water polo player

Personal information
- Full name: Kedar Nath Shah
- Nationality: Indian
- Born: 23 March 1923

Sport
- Sport: Water polo

Kedar Shah (born 23 March 1923) was an Indian water polo player. He competed in the men's tournament at the 1952 Summer Olympics.
