= Elijah Interfaith Institute =

International interfaith organization based in Jerusalem

The Elijah Interfaith Institute
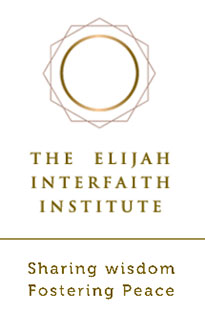
- Formation: 1997
- Type: NGO
- Headquarters: Jerusalem, Israel
- Head: Rabbi Alon Goshen-Gottstein
- Affiliations: UNESCO
- Website: elijah-interfaith.org

Elijah Interfaith Institute is a nonprofit, international, UNESCO-sponsored interfaith organization founded by Rabbi Alon Goshen-Gottstein in 1997. Headquartered in Jerusalem, Elijah has offices and representatives in different countries, and holds its activities in multiple international settings. The opening in 2026 of the Global House of Friendship and Hope in Assisi, Italy constitutes a new chapter in the organization’s history, making Assisi a center of its global activities.

== Elijah Board of World Religious Leaders ==
The Elijah Board of World Religious Leaders brings together religious figures from Judaism, Islam, Christianity, Buddhism and the Religions of India in order to provide a platform for the exchange of ideas. The Board numbers about 70 leaders from all faith traditions, and includes figures such as the Dalai Lama, Cardinal Schönborn, Mustafa Cerić, and Mata Amritanandamayi. Friendship is a fundamental aspect of what has been cultivated within the Board of World Religious Leaders and the ideal of friendship has served as a driver for public initiatives and now for the Global House of Friendship and Hope. The Elijah Board of World Religious Leaders convenes in-person bi-annually, in different locations around the globe. It has met to date twelve times, since its foundation in Seville in 2003. Sub-groups have met on specific projects of common interest.

The Board of World Religious Leaders has issued statements on matters of global concern. Of even greater note are various major international initiatives that enjoyed high visibility.

These include:

- Make Friends – A call by premier world religious leaders for practicing friendship across faiths. The project had an estimated reach of 200M.
- Coronaspection – Religious Leaders offer spiritual direction, during the pandemic.
- Faith In Ukraine – the first interfaith delegation to the Ukraine, soon after the breakout of war. This is, in fact, the first interfaith solidarity mission of religious leaders to a war zone. The event was broadcast throughout Ukraine.
- Climate Repentance – High visibility during Cop 27 and since, of an interreligious repentance ceremony, to enhance a sense of responsibility for climate action.

== Elijah Interfaith Academy ==
One of the particularities of the Elijah Interfaith Institute is the bringing together of religious leaders and scholars. Scholars prepare and moderate meetings of religious leaders. Projects undertaken by the Academy deal with religion in contemporary society, and with the theoretical foundations of interfaith relations.

A series of publications of the work of the Interfaith Academy, titled "Interreligious Reflections” is published by Wipf and Stock. Titles include:

- Goshen-Gottstein, Alon, ed. (2018). The Future of Religious Leadership: World Religions in Conversation. Interreligious Reflections. Wipf and Stock. ISBN 978-1-5326-5926-3.
- Goshen-Gottstein, Alon, ed. (2018). Friendship Across Religions: Theological Perspectives on Interreligious Friendship. Interreligious Reflections. Wipf and Stock. ISBN 978-1-5326-5891-4.
- Goshen-Gottstein, Alon, ed. (2018). Memory and Hope: Forgiveness, Healing, and Interfaith Relations. Interreligious Reflections. Wipf and Stock. ISBN 978-1-5326-5923-2.
- Goshen-Gottstein, Alon, ed. (2018). Sharing Wisdom: Benefits and Boundaries of Interreligious Learning. Interreligious Reflections. Wipf and Stock. ISBN 978-1-5326-5924-9.
- Goshen-Gottstein, Alon, ed. (2018). The Crisis of the Holy: Challenges and Transformations in World Religions. Interreligious Reflections. Wipf and Stock. ISBN 978-1-5326-5925-6.
- Goshen-Gottstein, Alon, ed. (2018). The Religious Other: Hostility, Hospitality, and the Hope of Human Flourishing. Interreligious Reflections. Wipf and Stock. ISBN 978-1-5326-5927-0.
- Goshen-Gottstein, Alon, ed. (2021). Interreligious Heroes: Role Models and Spiritual Exemplars for Interfaith Practice. Interreligious Reflections. Wipf and Stock. ISBN 978-1-6667-0960-5.

A project focusing on outstanding religious personalities and how they can be inspiring across religious divides suggests the idea of “Religious Genius” as a meaningful category. A volume Titled * Goshen-Gottstein, Alon (2017). Religious Genius: Appreciating Inspiring Individuals Across Traditions. Palgrave Macmillan. doi:10.1007/978-3-319-55514-0. ISBN 978-3-319-55513-3..

In addition, projects focusing on theology of religions have been developed with special emphasis on Jewish Theology of Religions. Several book titles have appeared with this particular focus.

== Elijah School for the Study of Wisdom in World Religions ==
Prior to the creation of the Board and Academy, Elijah was known as the Elijah School for the Study of Wisdom in World Religions. Not only did the school bring together twelve Jerusalem-based Jewish, Christian, and Muslim institutions within an academic consortium, but it also provided one of the few places in Israel where Orthodox, Conservative and Reform Jews met without prejudice. An Elijah Summer School consists of academic study, which takes place not in isolation or in abstraction, but within an interfaith community of faculty and students. Interfaith dialogue forms the backbone of the school and allows for the integration of the study of religious traditions with exposure to their lived spirituality. The summer school program has taken place in Israel, Canada, the United States, and most recently in Assisi, Italy, in conjunction with the opening of the Global House of Friendship and Hope. For a select list of summer school topics see.

== Prayer Initiatives ==
The Elijah Institute has been the primary driver, since 2014, of the monthly, or more frequent, interfaith prayer gathering, titled Praying Together in Jerusalem. Together with other organizations, local and international, it convenes a monthly study and prayer session for peace, either in person or online. Participants are drawn from Elijah’s network of leaders and scholars and from diverse religious communities and educational institutions in Israel. These prayer initiatives have been particularly important and led to the development of an international community of followers during the pandemic, and later during the Gaza war, following events of October 7th, focusing on the theme of Human Dignity.
