= Orit Kedar =

Israeli political scientist

- אורית קדר
- Education: Tel Aviv University; Brown University; Harvard University
- Awards: William H. Riker Award, APSA; Lawrence Longley Award, APSA
- Scientific career
- Fields: Political science
- Workplaces: University of Michigan; Tel Aviv University; Massachusetts Institute of Technology; Hebrew University of Jerusalem

Orit Kedar (Hebrew: אורית קדר) is an Israeli political scientist. She is a professor of political science at the Hebrew University of Jerusalem, where she is also affiliated with the Federmann Center for the Study of Rationality. She specializes in electoral politics, electoral systems and party systems, and comparative vote choice under different political systems.

== Education and early work ==
Kedar attended Tel Aviv University, where she earned a BA in economics and political science. She then obtained an MA in political science at Brown University. In 2003 she completed a PhD in political science at Harvard University, where she earned the Noxon Toppan Award for the Best Dissertation in Political Science in 2003.

After completing her PhD, Kedar joined the faculty at the University of Michigan, where she was also affiliated with the Center for Political Studies and the Center for European Studies. From 2006 to 2007 she was a post-doctoral fellow at Tel Aviv University, and then she moved to the political science faculty at The Massachusetts Institute of Technology. In 2009 she joined the faculty of the Hebrew University of Jerusalem. She has also held visiting positions at New York University and the European University Institute.

== Career ==
In 2009, Kedar published the book Voting for Policy, Not Parties: How Voters Compensate for Power Sharing. The book is motivated by puzzles in the traditional Downsian spatial theory of issue voting in which electors cast a vote for whichever candidate is closest to them on each issue: Kedar points out several empirical patterns that cannot easily be explained in this framework such as the tendencies for voters in parliamentary systems to vote for candidates more extreme than themselves, and the tendency in presidential systems for the president's party to perform worse in elections that do not coincide with the presidential election even when no change in the party's positions takes place between those elections. Voting for Policy, Not Parties explains these patterns as the result of a "compensatory vote model" in which voters tend to overshoot their desired policies in systems that feature substantial power-sharing between different parties, with the expectation that the party they vote for will be moderated by the parties it has to share power with. Conversely, in systems with minimal power-sharing, voters under this model should be expected to vote for their true policy preferences. The book won the 2010 William H. Riker award from the American Political Science Association, which is awarded to "the best book on political economy published during the past three calendar years".

Kedar's article "Are Voters Equal under the Proportional Representation", published in the American Journal of Political Science, won the 2017 Lawrence Longley Award from the American Political Science Association for the best article published each year on the topic of representation and electoral systems.

Kedar was elected as the President of the European Political Science Association for the 2018–2019 term. In addition to her academic publications, Kedar has written pieces for Haaretz and the LSE Blogs.

== Selected works ==
- Voting for Policy, Not Parties: How Voters Compensate for Power Sharing. ISBN 978-0-521-76457-5.
- "Are Voters Equal under the Proportional Representation", American Journal of Political Science, 2016

== Selected awards ==
- William H. Riker Award, American Political Science Association (2010)
- Lawrence Longley Award, American Political Science Association (2017)
