= Alon Goshen-Gottstein =

- אלון גושן גוטשטיין
- Born: 4.11.1956; England
- Known for: Founder and Director of the Elijah Interfaith Institute, Scholarship
- Spouse: Therese Andrevon
- Children: Elisha, Nerya
- Parent(s): Moshe Goshen-Gottstein, Esther Goshen-Gottstein

Academic background
- Education: Hebrew University of Jerusalem, Harvard University
- Thesis: God and Israel as Father and Son in Tannaitic Literature (1986)
- Doctoral advisor: Ephraim Urbach

Academic work
- Institutions: Tel Aviv University, Elijah Interfaith Institute, Bet Morasha College, Shalom Hartman Institute
- Notable works: In God’s Presence: A Theological ReIntroduction to Judaism, “Interreligious Reflections” series.

Alon Goshen-Gottstein (Hebrew: אלון גושן גוטשטיין; born November 4, 1956, England) is founder of the Elijah Interfaith Institute (1997), a scholar of Jewish studies, theologian, theoretician activist in the domain of interfaith dialogue and interpreter of Hassidic music. Within the field of interfaith relations, he specializes in bridging the theological and academic dimension with a variety of practical initiatives, especially involving world religious leadership.

== Education and academic career ==
Goshen-Gottstein attended Hebrew University of Jerusalem with a concentration in the fields of Talmud and Jewish Thought. He also studied at Harvard University Christianity and religions. He received a PhD from Hebrew University in Jerusalem in 1986. His thesis was on the subject "God and Israel as Father and Son in Tannaitic Literature. His PhD was supervised by Ephraim Urbach. He has taught at a variety of Israeli universities, especially Tel Aviv University.

== Interfaith work ==
His personal experience led him to found in 1997 the Elijah Interfaith Institute, initially as a consortium of 13 Jerusalem-based academic theological schools. The Institute evolved into a global gathering of premier religious figures (Elijah Board of World Religious Leaders) and scholars.

== Publications ==
The following list of his book publications is divided into three areas: Jewish thought and spirituality, Jewish Theology of Religions, Interfaith Studies.

=== Jewish Thought and Spirituality ===
- Goshen-Gottstein, Alon (2025). In God's Presence: A Theological Reintroduction to Judaism. Michigan, United States: Baker Publishing Group (published Oct 21, 2025). ISBN 978-1-5409-6983-5.
- Goshen-Gottstein, Alon (Ed.) (2018), Rabbinic Thought: Shifting Ideals and Values in Dialogue with Scripture and Tradition, Da'at 86, 2018, Bar Ilan University Press (Hebrew)
- Goshen-Gottstein, Alon (2000). The Sinner and the Amnesiac: The Rabbinic Invention of Elisha ben Abuya and Eleazar ben Arach. Palo Alto: Stanford University Press. 2000.
- Goshen-Gottstein, Alon (1987). God and Israel as Father and Son in Tannaitic Literature (PhD) (in Hebrew). Hebrew University of Jerusalem. Unpublished Hebrew Phd, Hebrew University of Jerusalem, available on Academia website page.

=== Jewish Theology of Religions ===
- Goshen-Gottstein, Alon (2023). Covenant and World Religions: Irving Greenberg, Jonathan Sacks and the Quest for Orthodox Pluralism. Liverpool, England: Liverpool University Press/Littman Library. ISBN 978-1800348509.
- Goshen-Gottstein, Alon, ed. (2023). Idolatry: A Contemporary Jewish Conversation. Boston, Massachusetts: Academic Studies Press. ISBN 9798887191379.
- Goshen-Gottstein, Alon, ed. (2022) | Judaism and Hinduism Contemporary Jewry (vol. 41,3)
- Goshen-Gottstein, Alon (2020). Judaism's Challenge: Election, Divine Love, and Human Enmity. Boston: Academic Studies Press. ISBN 9781644691489.
- Goshen-Gottstein, Alon (2016). The Jewish Encounter with Hinduism: History, Spirituality, Identity. Interreligious Studies in Theory and Practice. Palgrave Macmillan. doi:10.1007/978-1-137-45529-1. ISBN 978-1-137-55819-0.
- Goshen-Gottstein, Alon (2020). Religious truth : Towards a Jewish Theology of Religions. London: The Littman Library of Jewish Civilization. ISBN 978-1-786-94228-9.
- Goshen-Gottstein, Alon (2016). The Jewish Encounter with Hinduism: Wisdom, Spirituality, Identity. New York, NY: Palgrave Macmillan. ISBN 978-1-137-55819-0. OCLC 999650270.
- Goshen-Gottstein, Alon (2016). Same God, Other god: Judaism, Hinduism, and the Problem of Idolatry. New York, NY: Palgrave Macmillan. ISBN 978-1-137-55820-6. OCLC 1002418745.
- Goshen-Gottstein, Alon; Eugene Korn (2012). Jewish Theology and World Religions. Oxford Portland, Or: Littman Library of Jewish Civilization. ISBN 978-1-906764-09-8. OCLC 1039917548.

=== Interfaith Studies ===
- Goshen-Gottstein, Alon, ed. (2021). Interreligious Heroes: Role Models and Spiritual Exemplars for Interfaith Practice. Eugene, Oregon: Wipf and Stock Publishers. ISBN 9781666721898.
- Goshen-Gottstein, Alon (2020). Coronaspection: World Religious Leaders Reflect on COVID-19. Eugene, Oregon: Wipf and Stock Publishers. ISBN 9781725284432.
- Goshen-Gottstein, Alon (2018) Luther the Anti-Semite: A Contemporary Jewish Perspective. Fortress Press. 2018
- Goshen-Gottstein, Alon (2017). Religious Genius: Appreciating Inspiring Individuals Across Traditions. Cham, Switzerland: Palgrave Macmillan. ISBN 978-3-319-55513-3. OCLC 992789031.
- Goshen-Gottstein, Alon (2017). Sharing Wisdom : Benefits and Boundaries of Interreligious Learning. Lanham: Lexington Books. ISBN 978-1-4985-4557-0. OCLC 953630769.
- Goshen-Gottstein, Alon (2016). The Future of Religious Leadership : World Religions in Conversation. Lanham: Lexington Books. ISBN 978-1-4985-4024-7. OCLC 951506523.
- Goshen-Gottstein, Alon (2015). Friendship Across Religions : Theological Perspectives on Interreligious Friendship. Lanham: Lexington Books. ISBN 978-1-4985-2635-7. OCLC 913890469.
- Goshen-Gottstein, Alon (2014). The Crisis of the Holy: Challenges and Transformations in World Religions. Lanham: Lexington Books. ISBN 978-1-4985-0343-3. OCLC 884480392.
- Goshen-Gottstein, Alon (2014). The Religious Other: Hostility, Hospitality, and the Hope of Human Flourishing. Lanham: Lexington Books. ISBN 978-0-7391-9257-3. OCLC 879602637.
- Goshen-Gottstein, Alon and Reis Habito, Maria (2008). Die Krise Des Heiligen Herausgegeben (German). EOS. 2008. German language version of The Crisis of the Holy, 2014.

== Hassidic Music ==
Alongside his academic and interfaith work, Goshen-Gottstein is also a contemporary interpreter of Hassidic music. He has recorded five albums of Hassidic music, with special arrangements for voice and piano, introducing a “lieder” approach to this music, with a musical orientation drawing on Jazz and classical music, as accompaniment. His musical explorations have covered two Hassidic traditions, Breslav and Modzhitz.

Recordings: Meditations of the Heart, the Breslav Tradition, vol.1, with Israel Edelson. Available on Spotify. Meditations of the Heart, the Breslav Tradition, vol. 2, with Israel Edelson. Available on Spotify. Fire and Praise, (Hallel based on Modzhitz nigunim), recorded with Kenny Werner. Available on Spotify. Shabbat, songs of R. Israel Taub of Modzhitz, Recorded with Kenny Werner, forthcoming. Niggunim, songs of R. Israel Taub of Modzhitz, Recorded with Kenny werner, forthcoming.
