= Orion Center =

Israeli research institute

Orion Center for the Study of the Dead Sea Scrolls and Associated Literature is an Israeli research institute affiliated with the Hebrew University of Jerusalem.

== History ==
The Orion Center was established in 1995 as part of the Institute for Jewish Studies at the Hebrew University of Jerusalem. The center engages in study and research of the Dead Sea Scrolls.

Over the years, the center has hosted a series of symposia bringing together many of the world's experts on the scrolls to give papers on topics related to the specific theme of that year's symposium. The symposias have examined such subjects as liturgical and wisdom texts, the relationships between Qumran and rabbinic writings, and Qumran and early Christianity. Symposia proceedings were later published by E.J. Brill, Leiden, in the series, Studies on the Texts of the Desert of Judah.

Beginning in the 1990s the center organized the "Scrolls Forum", a lecture series in collaboration with the Israel Museum, held at the museum.

In 2001 the researcher Emanuel Tov donated the Qumran News Clippings Archive to the center. The archive was later maintained by the Orion Center staff.

The center also hosted The Orion list, an e-mail discussion group active from 1995 until the end of 2002.

Since 1999 the Orion Center has held regular seminars relating to the Dead Sea Scrolls in memory of Professor Jonas C. Greenfield. Emanuel Tov gave the inaugural seminar on "The Greek Texts from the Judaean Desert".
