= Hebrew University Bible Project =

The Hebrew University Bible Project (HUBP) is a project at the Hebrew University of Jerusalem to create the first edition of the Hebrew Bible that reproduces the text of the Aleppo Codex and includes a thorough critical apparatus.

It was begun in 1956 by Moshe Goshen-Gottstein, assisted by Chaim Rabin and Shemaryahu Talmon. These three scholars were the project's first board of editors.

The text reproduced in this edition is the Aleppo Codex; the full masora (large and small) in that manuscript is included, but not massora from other sources. Six levels of footnotes record textual variants from a wide range of sources. These include:

- Translations: the Septuagint, the Vulgate, the Vetus Latina, the Peshitta, the targums and Saadia Gaon's Arabic translation.
- Manuscripts, such as the Dead Sea Scrolls and the most important mediaeval copies (particularly the Codex Cairensis and the Leningrad Codex).
- Rabbinic works, including the two Talmuds and various midrashim (many examined for this purpose for the first time).

The editors add comments in English and Hebrew.

So far, the books of Isaiah, Jeremiah, Ezekiel, and The Twelve Prophets have been published.

== See also ==
- Biblia Hebraica Quinta
- Oxford Hebrew Bible
