= Heidelberg University of Jewish Studies =

Coordinates: 49.4099°N 8.7016°E

The Center for Jewish Studies Heidelberg (German: Hochschule für Jüdische Studien Heidelberg, or HfJS) is an accredited institution of higher learning, supported by the Central Council of Jews in Germany and funded by the German federal government. The HfJS operates in close cooperation with the University of Heidelberg and opens its doors to students and scholars, regardless of religious affiliation.

== History ==
The center was founded by the Central Council of Jews in Germany in 1979. Already in 1971 the then State Rabbi of Baden Nathan Peter Levinson moved to establish an educational institution for rabbis, cantors and teachers of religious education. The institute was meant to be formed according to the tradition of the academies of the Wissenschaft des Judentums in Berlin and to entrench Jewish scholarship again in the scholarly landscape of Germany.

One year later the Oberrat der Israeliten Badens enacted a memorandum in which Heidelberg was suggested as the designated place of residence for the facility so that the academic cooperation with the University of Heidelberg could be carried out. The Central Council of Jews in Germany acted on the proposal with the resolve to utilize the denominational orientation to establish a scholarly institution at which all interested academic parties could seek higher education.

Finally, following the resolution of the Central Council of Jews in Germany, the University of Jewish Studies in Heidelberg (HfJS) was founded in 1979 with 16 students. Designed as an academic facility, the institution has carried on its goal from the time of its conception to the present day to impart the complexity and fascination of Judaism to its Jewish and non-Jewish students at the highest academic level. Two years after the institution was founded, the HfJS received its national accreditation and subsequently achieved its right to award doctorates in 1995. Furthermore, the HfJS has been a member of the German Rectors’ Conference since 2007 and has been institutionally accredited by the German Council of Science and Humanities since 2009. Throughout the course of construction in the 1980s the institution’s professors were acting lecturers at other universities. Today the HfJS has 11 professorships and just as many research assistantships.

The center serves as a reference point for political discourse, as well as for media, churches and schools. It explores a broad range of research topics within the field of Jewish Studies, including Art, Philosophy, History, Political Sciences, Modern Literatures, Linguistics, Rabbinical literature, Biblical Exegesis and Theory of Religion.

Moreover, the HfJS provides strong language training at all levels (in Biblical, Rabbinical and Modern Hebrew, as well as Aramaic and Hebrew-scripted languages, such as Yiddish and Judeo-Arabic). The HfJS has acquired academic partnerships with international universities in Israel, Austria and Sweden and regularly organizes conferences and issues a periodical publication, entitled Trumah.

== Endowed Chairs ==
=== Ignatz Bubis Endowed Chair of History, Religion and Culture of European Judaism ===
This chair was created in 2001 in memory of the influential chairman and later president of the Central Council of Jews in Germany, Ignatz Bubis (1927-1999). Currently held by Johannes Heil, this chair concentrates on all facets of European Judaism, from the antique period to the present day, including the diaspora of European communities at large. The focus areas concern political, social and cultural transformation, as well as various mystical and religious movements, as are characteristic of the ever-changing course of Jewish history in Europe.

=== Ben Gurion Endowed Chair of Israel and Middle Eastern Studies ===
This chair has been endowed by the State of Baden-Württemberg and is the only chair in the religion of Israel and the Middle East in the German-speaking world. This chair is a joint research professorship between the University of Heidelberg and the HfJS.It is currently held by Prof.Johannes Becke.Students of all faculties of the HfJS and the University of Heidelberg take part in the curriculum composed of contemporary research topics spanning from socio-cultural to political aspects of Israel and the Middle East.

=== Other Chairs at the HfJS ===
- Hebrew and Jewish Literature
- Hebrew Linguistics
- Literature, Yiddish Studies
- Global Jewish History
- Religious Pedagogy
- Biblical Studies and Exegesis
- Jewish Philosophy and Intellectual History
- Rabbinic Literature
- Jewish Art

== HfJS Rabbinate ==
The Campus Rabbi at the HfJS, as well as the Beth Midrash in the facility, provides students the opportunity to continue their private Jewish lifestyle.

== Degree Programs ==
- B.A. Jewish Studies
- B.A. Practical Jewish Studies
- B.A. Jewish Pedagogy
- M.A. Jewish Studies
- M.A. Jewish Studies/History of Jewish Culture (Joint Degree with the Karl-Franzen-University of Graz)
- M.A. Jewish Civilizations (Partnership Program with Paideia—The European Institute for Jewish Studies in Sweden)
- M.A. Jewish Museology
- M.A. Medieval Studies (Heidelberger Mittelaltermaster in conjunction with the University of Heidelberg)
- M.A. Classical and Modern Literature

== Cooperative Partners ==
- Ruprecht-Karls-Universität Heidelberg
- Centrum für Jüdische Studien der Karl-Franzens-Universität Graz (Joint-Degree Master's program "Jewish Studies – History of Jewish Cultures")
- Hebrew University of Jerusalem
- Fachhochschule Heidelberg
- Pädagogische Hochschule Heidelberg
- Paideia—The European Institute for Jewish Studies in Sweden
- Orthodoxe Rabbinerkonferenz Deutschland (ORD)
- Zentralarchiv zur Erforschung der Geschichte der Juden in Deutschland
- Ben-Gurion-University in Beer-Sheva

== Literature ==
- Michael Graetz, Gerd Biegel (Hrsg.): Vom Mittelalter in die Neuzeit. Jüdische Städtebilder. Hochschule für Jüdische Studien, Heidelberg 2000, (Ausstellungskatalog).
- Trumah - Zeitschrift der Hochschule für Jüdische Studien Heidelberg. ISSN 0935-1035.
- Johannes Heil / Daniel Krochmalnik (Hrsg.): Jüdische Studien als Disziplin - die Disziplinen der Jüdischen Studien. Festschrift der Hochschule für Jüdische Studien Heidelberg 1979–2009. Heidelberg 2010, ISBN 978-3-8253-5687-3 (= Schriften der Hochschule für Jüdische Studien Heidelberg, Band 13).
