= Ernest Klein =

Hungarian-Canadian rabbi, linguist and scholar (1899–1983)

Rabbi Ernest David Klein
- Born: 26 July 1899; Szatmárnémeti, Austria-Hungary (now Satu Mare, Romania)
- Died: 4 February 1983 (aged 83); Toronto, Canada
- Spouse(s): Wife and son killed in Auschwitz during the Holocaust

Ecclesiastical career
- Religion: Jewish
- Ordained: 1920 (rabbi)
- Congregations: Congregation Beth Yitshak (Toronto)(1951-83); Nové Zámky community, Czechoslovakia (1931-38), Hungary (1938-1944); rabbi of the synagogue on Rue de Montevideo in Paris (1950–1951)

Academic background
- Education: University of Vienna; University of Budapest

Academic work
- Discipline: etymology; linguistics

Ernest David Klein, OC (July 26, 1899 – February 4, 1983) was a Hungarian-born Romanian-Canadian linguist, author, and rabbi.

== Early life and education ==
Klein was born to father Yitzchok (Ignac) and mother Sarah Rachel (Roza) Klein (née Friedrich) on July 26, 1899. in Szatmárnémeti (also known as Szatmar), in Partium, a region of Kingdom of Hungary (now Satu Mare, Romania. He had three sisters.

Klein's father was a respected scholar known for his brilliance. He was rabbi of the Jewish Status Quo Community in Marosvásárhely (now Târgu Mureș, Romania) and author of over 20 books on rabbinical subjects, including the following (all were printed in Satu Mare):

- Hebrew Torah Journal Ohel Yitzchok (1903–1914)
- Hebrew Book Zichron L'Yisroel (1912)
- Hebrew Torah Journal Sefer Hamagid (1928–1934)
- Hebrew Torah Journal Magid Yeruchem (1925–1930)
- Hebrew Book Kol Ha'chatan (1937)

Klein's mother also had rabbinical lineage. She was one of the daughters of Chaim (Jakob) Friedrich who was rabbi of the orthodox community in Turc, Ugocsa County, Kingdom of Hungary (now part of Turț, Satu Mare County, Romania).

From early on in Klein's childhood, his greatness was already noted. At the young age of nine years, Klein was able to recite the entire Book of Psalms by heart. As a youth in Hungary, Klein spent his free time in between classes learning new languages. Remarkably, at the age of 15, Klein taught himself English using English language textbooks. Klein had a great talent in learning languages. In an interview by The Canadian Jewish News (August 1, 1975), Klein recalls traveling from his birthplace Satu Mare, Romania to Austria, a little uneasy at the prospect of studying in a foreign country where he did not know the language. Klein taught himself German during the few days journey, and by the end of the year he was the best pupil in his class. Over the years Klein acquired more than 40 languages.

Klein passed his exams to become a rabbi in 1920 when he was 21 years old.

Klein studied languages, philology and exact philosophy at the University of Budapest and the University of Vienna; he received his Doctorate of Philosophy from the latter in 1925. Fifty years later, in 1975 at a ceremony held in Canada by the Austrian Consulate, Klein was awarded the "Golden Ph.D." on his promotion to Doctorate of Philosophy by the University of Vienna.

== Rabbinical career and deportation to Auschwitz ==
He was the rabbi of the Nové Zámky community, Czechoslovakia, Érsekújvár - since 1938 part of Hungary - from 1931 to 1944 (today part of Slovakia) when he was deported to Auschwitz and Dachau. His wife and young son were killed in Czechoslovakia before World War II officially commenced. His father and two of his three sisters were killed in Auschwitz. He was freed from Dachau by US troops in 1945.

After the war he served briefly as the rabbi in his hometown of Satu Mare. After emigrating to France, he was a rabbi of the synagogue on Rue de Montevideo in Paris (1950–1951) and in 1951 he emigrated to Canada, with his sister Elizabeth and her husband. There he held the post of Rabbi of Congregation Beth Yitshak in Toronto, founded by Hungarian-speaking Holocaust survivors and named for Klein's father Yitschak. He served as the community's rabbi until his death in 1983.

== Author ==
Klein wrote three etymological dictionaries. His most famous work is A Comprehensive Etymological Dictionary of the English Language (1966–1967).

He is also the author of A Comprehensive Etymological Dictionary of the Hebrew Language for Readers of English (1987), an English-language etymological dictionary of Hebrew to which he devoted the last ten years of his life.

He wrote an etymological dictionary of medical terms which was not published.

== Honors ==
For his scholarly work he received honorary degrees from McMaster University and the University of Guelph in 1977. In 1978, he was made an Officer of the Order of Canada.
