= Wanderwort =

Linguistic term for a widely dispersed word

A Wanderwort (German: [ˈvandɐvɔʁt] translated from German as 'migrant word', literally "wander word", sometimes pluralized as Wanderwörter, usually capitalized following German practice) is a word that has spread as a loanword among numerous languages and cultures, especially those that are far away from one another. As such, Wanderwörter are a curiosity in historical linguistics and sociolinguistics within a wider study of language contact. At a sufficient time depth, it can be very difficult to establish in which language or language family a Wanderwort originated and into which it was borrowed, serving as another Wanderwort characteristic in linguistics.

Frequently, they are spread through trade networks, or through the adoption of external technological, economic, or cultural practices. Common examples of Wanderwörter are used to describe a previously unfamiliar domesticated plant or animal in Eurasia and Africa.

== Examples ==
Typical examples of Wanderwörter are cannabis (hemp), sugar, ginger, copper, silver, cumin, mint, wine, and honey, some of which can be traced back to Bronze Age trade.

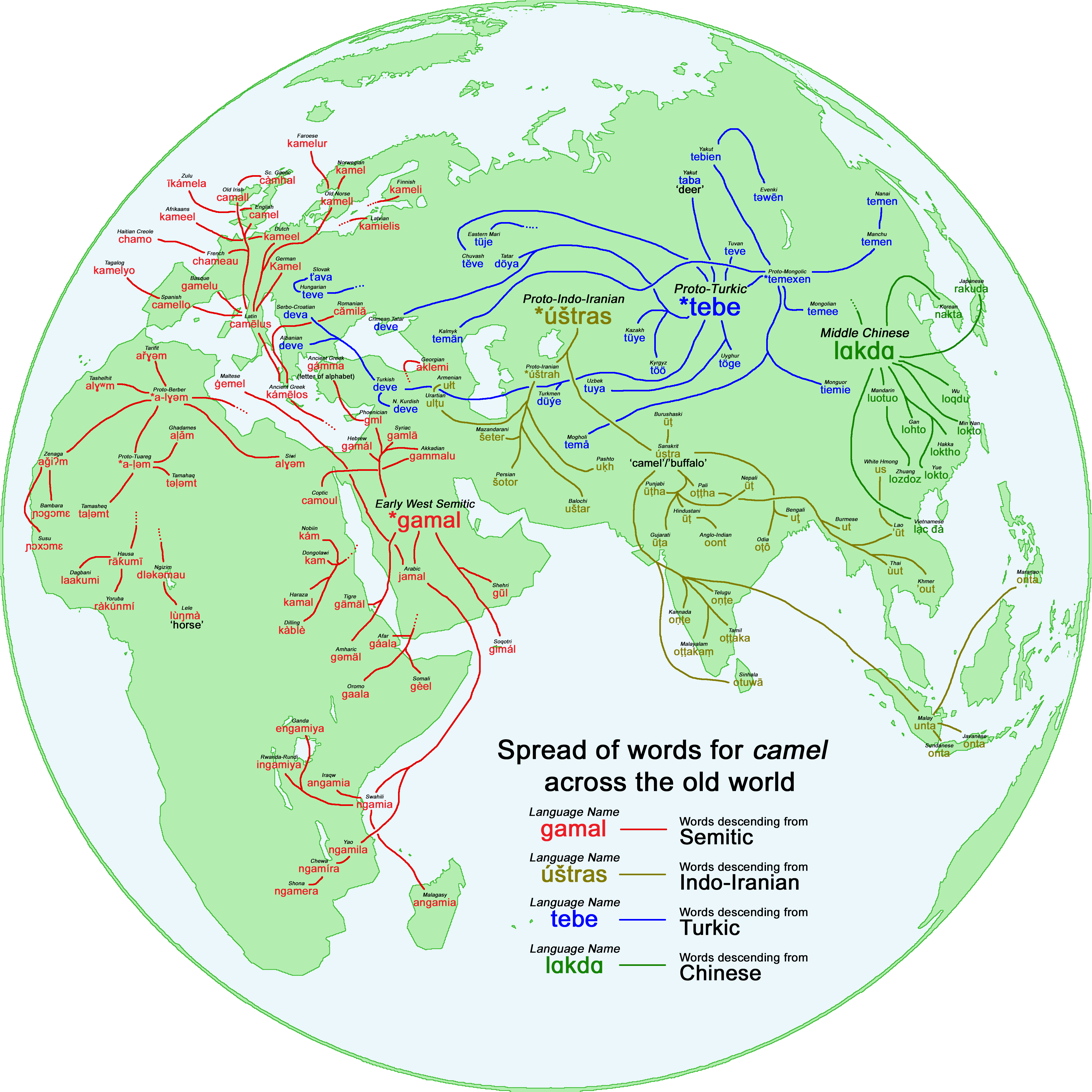
Four Wanderwörter with the meaning 'camel'. Extensive loaning has carried Semitic, Turkic, Indo-Iranian, and Chinese words for 'camel' throughout Africa and Eurasia.

Tea, with its Eurasian continental variant chai, is an example whose spread occurred relatively late in human history and is therefore fairly well understood: tea is from Hokkien 茶 tê, specifically Amoy dialect, from the Fujianese port of Xiamen, hence it is the maritime variant, while 茶 chá (whence chai) is used in Cantonese and Mandarin.

Chocolate and tomato were both taken from Classical Nahuatl via Spanish into many different languages, although the specific origin of chocolate is obscure.

Farang, a term derived from the ethnonym Frank through Andalusian Arabic, refers to foreigners (typically white and European ones). From the above two languages, the word has been loaned into many languages spoken on or near the Indian Ocean, including Hindi, Thai, and Amharic, among others. It also existed in Russian in the form "фрязин" with the same meaning.

Kangaroo was taken from the Guugu Yimithirr word for the eastern grey kangaroo; it entered English through the records of James Cook's expedition of 1770 and through English to languages around the world.

Orange originated in a Dravidian language (likely Tamil, Telugu or Malayalam), and its likely path to English included, in order, Sanskrit, Persian, possibly Armenian, Arabic, Italian, and Old French.

The words for 'horse' across many Eurasian languages seem to be related such as Mongolian морь (mor), Manchu ᠮᠣᡵᡳᠨ (morin), Korean 말 (mal), Japanese 馬 (uma), and Thai ม้า (máː), as well as Sino-Tibetan languages like Mandarin 馬 (mǎ). It is present in several Celtic and Germanic languages, for example Irish marc and English mare.
