= Chaim Menachem Rabin =

Israeli linguist (1915–1996)

- Born: 22 November 1915; Giessen
- Died: 13 May 1996 (aged 80); Jerusalem
- Education: Doctor of Philosophy
- Alma mater: SOAS University of London; University of Oxford
- Employer: Hebrew University of Jerusalem (1956–1986); University of Oxford (1941–1956)
- Relatives: Michael O. Rabin, Miriam Ben-Peretz

Chaim Menachem Rabin (Hebrew: חיים מנחם רבין; 22 November 1915 – 13 May 1996) was a German, then British, and finally Israeli professor of Hebrew and Semitic languages.

== Life ==
Chaim Rabin was born in Giessen, Germany, 22 November 1915, the son of Israel and Martel Rabin. Having completed his school studies in April 1933 he spent the year 1933–1934 in Palestine, studying at the Hebrew University of Jerusalem.

He then emigrated to England, where he eventually became a British citizen. He enrolled as a student at the School of Oriental Studies of the University of London where he received his BA degree in 1937. In 1939 he was awarded his PhD with his thesis Studies in Early Arabic Dialects at the now renamed School of Oriental and African Studies (SOAS), where from 1938 was employed as a lecturer.

On the outbreak of the war he was briefly interned on the Isle of Man, but he was soon released. In 1941 he moved to the University of Oxford, where he received his MA, then D.Phil. in 1942, with his thesis The Development of the Syntax of Post-Biblical Hebrew. In 1943 he was appointed Cowley Lecturer in Post-Biblical Hebrew there.

In 1956 with his wife, Batya, he emigrated to Israel, and took a post of Associate Professor, then full Professor of Hebrew Language at the Hebrew University of Jerusalem, where he remained until his retirement in 1985.

At the Second International Conference Seminar of Tamil Studies, held at Madras (now, Chennai), India, Prof. Rabin presented a study on "Loanword evidence in biblical Hebrew for trade between Tamil Nadu and Palestine in the first millennium BC" and projected his hopes "that some day a Tamil scholar may try and discover whether there are in Tamil any loanwords from Hebrew or from South-Arabian".

Following his early interest in Arabic dialects, Chaim Rabin's field were all aspects of Hebraic linguistics, in particular, translations of the language of the Bible, the Dead Sea Manuscripts, and the detailed study of medieval codices. He succeeded Moshe Goshen-Gottstein as chief editor of the Hebrew University Bible Project.

Rabin was a pioneer in training Israeli translators. Together with Shoshana Bloom, he established the Hebrew University's Department of Scientific Translation. He was a member of the Academy of the Hebrew Language and died in Jerusalem on 13 May 1996.

== Published works ==
- Hayim M. Nahmad with C. Rabin: Everyday Arabic: conversations in Syrian and Palestinian colloquial Arabic with vocabulary, phonetic and grammatical introduction, lists of useful culinary, military, political and commercial terms. with a Foreword by H. A. R. Gibb. London: Dent, 1940
- Arabic Reader. London: Lund Humphries 1947
- Everyday Hebrew - Twenty-nine Simple Conversations with English Translation and Full Grammatical Introduction London: Dent 1948
- Hebrew Reader. London: Lund Humphries 1949
- Ancient West-Arabian: a study of the dialects of the Western Highlands of Arabia in the sixth and seventh centuries A.D. London: Taylor's Foreign Press 1951
- Maimonides, The guide of the perplexed, with introduction and commentary by Julius Guttmann. translated from the Arabic by Chaim Rabin. London: East and West Library 1952
- The Zadokite Documents. I. The Admonition, II. The Laws. Edited with a translation and notes by Chaim Rabin. Oxford: Clarendon Press 1954
- The Beginnings of Classical Arabic. in Studia Islamica 4 (1955) pp. 19–37. reprinted in Ibn Warraq, What the Koran Really Says (2002)
- "Alexander Jannaeus and the Pharisees". in: Journal of Jewish Studies 7 (1956), pp. 3–11
- Qumran Studies. Oxford University Press 1957. republished Schocken 1975
- "The Linguistics of Translation". in: A. D. Booth (ed.), Aspects of Translation (Studies in Communications 2), London: Secker and Warburg 1958, pp. 123ff
- (with Yigael Yadin), Aspects of the Dead Sea scrolls. Jerusalem: Magnes Press, Hebrew University 1958
- Studies in the Bible : edited on behalf of the Institute of Jewish Studies in the Faculty of Humanities. Jerusalem: Magnes Press, Hebrew University 1961
- "Etymological Miscellanea", in: Scripta Hierosolymitana 8 (1961), pp. 384–400.
- Essays on the Dead Sea scrolls. In memory of E. L. Sukenik. Jerusalem : Hekhal Ha-Sefer, 1961
- Yigael Yadin (edited with commentary), The scroll of the War of the Sons of Light against the Sons of Darkness, translated by Batya and Chaim Rabin. London: Oxford University Press 1962
- Die Renaissance der hebräischen Sprache. Zürich : Israel-Informations-Büro, 1963
- The influence of different systems of Hebrew orthography on reading efficiency. Jerusalem: The Israel Institute of Applied Social Research 1968
- Loanword Evidence in Biblical Hebrew for Trade between Tamil Nad and Palestine in the First Millenium B.C.. in Asher R. E. (ed), Proceedings of the Second International Conference Seminar of Tamil Studies (1971), vol.1, pp. 432–440.
- Thesaurus of the Hebrew language in dictionary form. Jerusalem: Kiryat Sepher, 1970–1973
  - Thesaurus of the Hebrew ... ; Volume I. 1970
  - Thesaurus of the Hebrew ... ; Volume II. 1973
- A Short History of the Hebrew Language. Publishing Department of the Jewish Agency (1973)
- Chaim Rabin (Editor): Bible Translation: An Introduction. Israel: Bialik, 1984 (previously published in: Encyclopaedia biblica, 8 (1982), 737–870)
- Die Entwicklung der hebräischen Sprache. Wiesbaden : Reichert in Komm., 1988 (publications of the Hochschule für Jüdische Studien Heidelberg, Nr. 2)
- Chaim Rabin, Zvi Raday: Otsar ha-milim. Milim, tserufim e-imrot. (Thesaurus of the Hebrew Language in Dictionary Form. Edited by Chaim Rabin and Zvi Raday. 3 vols. Jerusalem, Sivan Press (1988) [contents: vol 1. A-L; vol 2. M-P; vol 3. TZ-T.]
- Chaim Rabin, Tzvi Raday: Hamilon HeHadash LaTanach (The New Bible Dictionary). (in Hebrew), 3 vols. Jerusalem: Keter Publishing House, 1989
- Semitic Languages - An Introduction. The Bialik Institute (Mosad Bialik) 1991
- Linguistic Studies : Collected Papers in Hebrew and Semitic Languages. Jerusalem, Israel: Bialik Institute, 1999
- The development of the syntax of post-biblical Hebrew. Leiden; Boston: Brill 2000. ISBN 90-04-11433-5.
