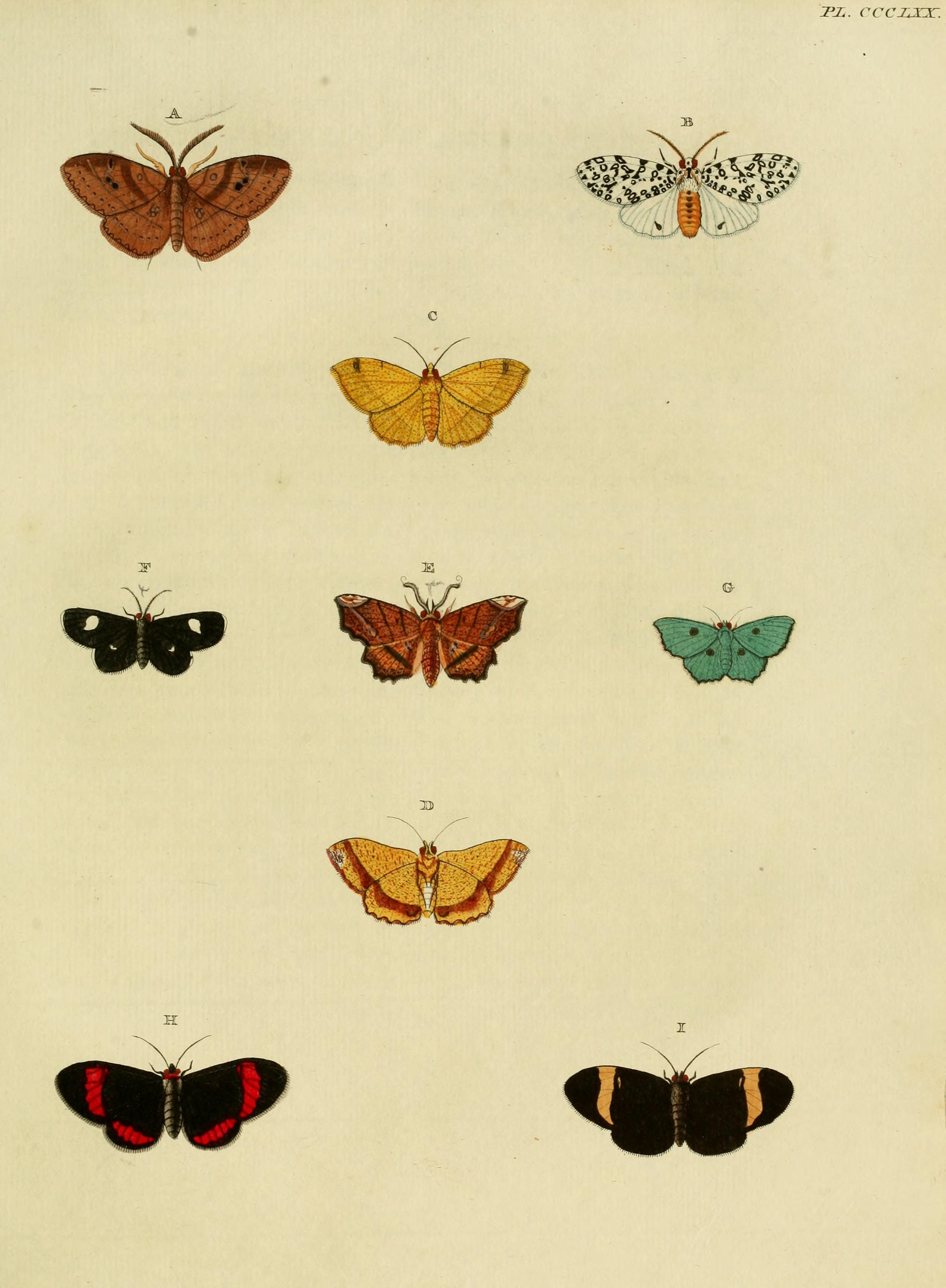

Scientific classification
- Kingdom: Animalia
- Phylum: Arthropoda
- Clade: Pancrustacea
- Class: Insecta
- Order: Lepidoptera
- Superfamily: Noctuoidea
- Family: Erebidae
- Subfamily: Arctiinae
- Subtribe: Pericopina
- Genus: Calodesma; Hübner, [1820]

Synonyms
- Acribia Felder, 1874; Chamesthema Felder, 1874; Leucopsumis Hübner, 1820; Stenelopsis Butler, 1877; Pyrodesma Boisduval, 1870

= Calodesma =

Genus of moths

Calodesma is a genus of tiger moths in the family Erebidae erected by Jacob Hübner in 1820.

== Species ==
- Calodesma albiapex Hering, 1925
- Calodesma amica Stoll, 1781
- Calodesma apicalis Hering, 1925
- Calodesma approximata Hering, 1925
- Calodesma chesalon Druce, 1885
- Calodesma collaris Drury, 1782
- Calodesma contracta Walker, 1854
- Calodesma dilutana Druce, 1907
- Calodesma dioptis Felder, 1874
- Calodesma eucyanoides Hering, 1925
- Calodesma exposita Butler, 1877
- Calodesma itaitubae Hering, 1925
- Calodesma jordani Hering, 1925
- Calodesma kedar Druce, 1900
- Calodesma maculifrons Walker, 1865
- Calodesma plorator Kaye, 1922
- Calodesma quadrimaculata Hering, 1925
- Calodesma rubricincta Dognin, 1923
- Calodesma tamara Hering, 1925
- Calodesma uraneides Butler, 1871
