= Calodesma approximata =

Scientific classification
- Kingdom: Animalia
- Phylum: Arthropoda
- Class: Insecta
- Order: Lepidoptera
- Superfamily: Noctuoidea
- Family: Erebidae
- Subfamily: Arctiinae
- Genus: Calodesma
- Species: C. approximata

Binomial name
- Calodesma approximata Hering, 1925

Synonyms
- Calodesma niepelti Hering, 1928

Species of moth

Calodesma approximata is a moth of the family Erebidae. It was described by Erich Martin Hering in 1925. It is found in French Guiana and Colombia.

== Subspecies ==
- Calodesma approximata approximata (French Guiana)
- Calodesma approximata niepelti Hering, 1928 (Colombia)
