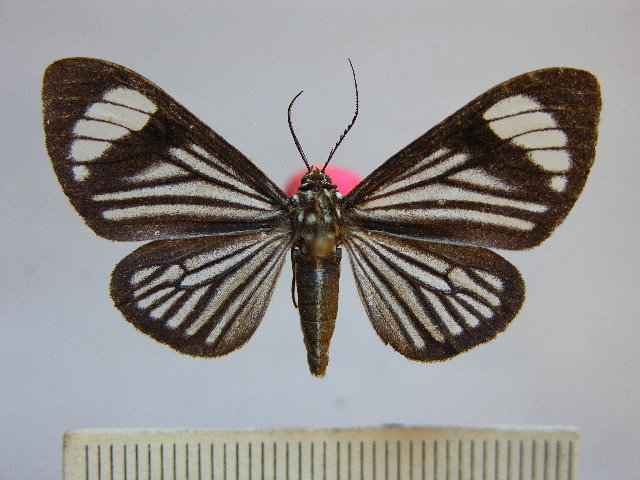

Scientific classification
- Domain: Eukaryota
- Kingdom: Animalia
- Phylum: Arthropoda
- Class: Insecta
- Order: Lepidoptera
- Superfamily: Noctuoidea
- Family: Erebidae
- Subfamily: Arctiinae
- Genus: Calodesma
- Species: C. uraneides

Binomial name
- Calodesma uraneides (Butler, 1871)

Synonyms
- Esthema uraneides Butler, 1871

= Calodesma uraneides =

Species of moth

Calodesma uraneides is a moth of the family Erebidae. It was described by Arthur Gardiner Butler in 1871. It is found in French Guiana.
