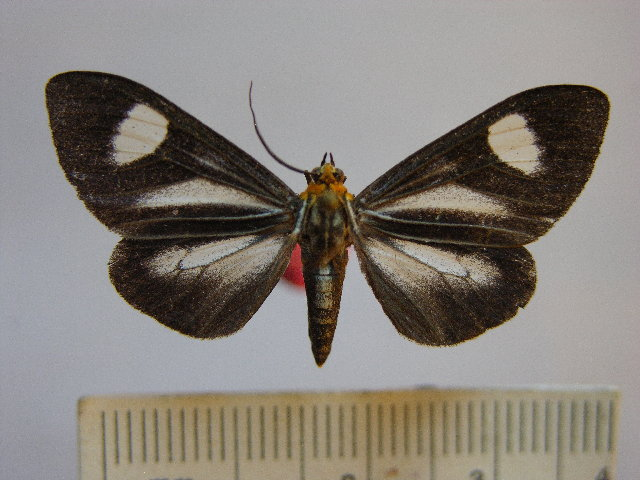

Scientific classification
- Domain: Eukaryota
- Kingdom: Animalia
- Phylum: Arthropoda
- Class: Insecta
- Order: Lepidoptera
- Superfamily: Noctuoidea
- Family: Erebidae
- Subfamily: Arctiinae
- Genus: Calodesma
- Species: C. dioptis

Binomial name
- Calodesma dioptis (Felder, 1874)

Synonyms
- Chamesthema dioptis Felder, 1874

= Calodesma dioptis =

Species of moth

Calodesma dioptis is a moth of the family Erebidae. It was described by Felder in 1874. It is found in Brazil, French Guiana and Bolivia.
