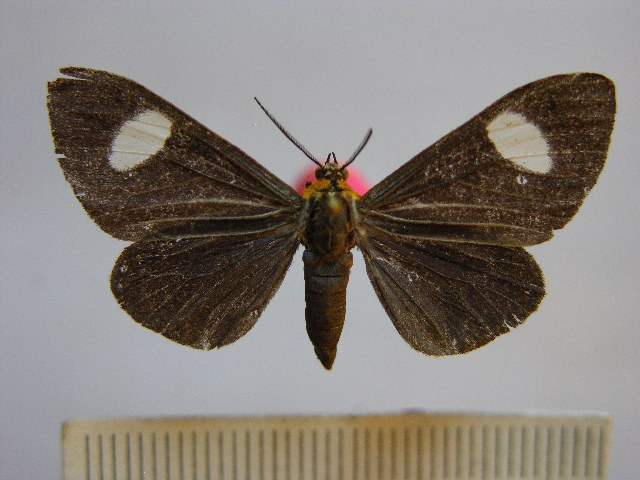

Scientific classification
- Domain: Eukaryota
- Kingdom: Animalia
- Phylum: Arthropoda
- Class: Insecta
- Order: Lepidoptera
- Superfamily: Noctuoidea
- Family: Erebidae
- Subfamily: Arctiinae
- Genus: Calodesma
- Species: C. collaris

Binomial name
- Calodesma collaris (Drury, 1782)

Synonyms
- Phalaena collaris Drury, 1782

= Calodesma collaris =

Species of moth

Calodesma collaris is a moth of the family Erebidae. It was described by Dru Drury in 1782. It is found in Brazil, Paraguay, Argentina and Bolivia.
