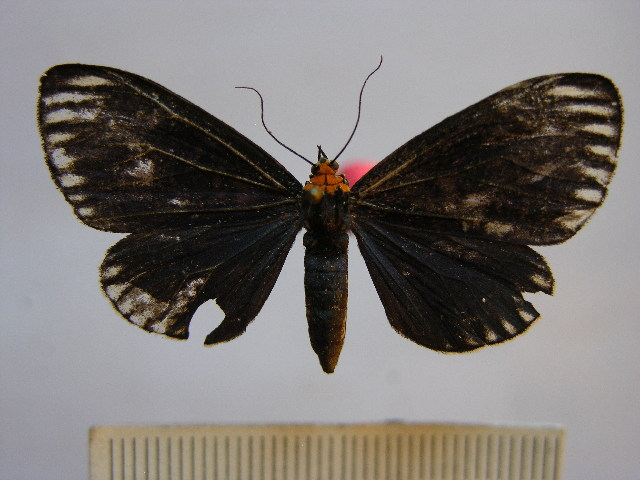

Scientific classification
- Kingdom: Animalia
- Phylum: Arthropoda
- Class: Insecta
- Order: Lepidoptera
- Superfamily: Noctuoidea
- Family: Erebidae
- Subfamily: Arctiinae
- Genus: Calodesma
- Species: C. maculifrons

Binomial name
- Calodesma maculifrons (Walker, 1865)

Synonyms
- Stenele maculifrons Walker, [1865]; Acribia maculifrons; Cocastra melanchroia Boisduval, 1870; Acribia melanchroia Felder, 1874; Calodesma melanchroia

= Calodesma maculifrons =

Species of insect

Calodesma maculifrons is a moth of the family Erebidae. It was described by Francis Walker in 1865. It is found in Mexico, Honduras, Costa Rica, Guatemala, Panama and Ecuador.

Larvae have been reared on several various Malpighiaceae species.
