= Calodesma exposita =

Scientific classification
- Domain: Eukaryota
- Kingdom: Animalia
- Phylum: Arthropoda
- Class: Insecta
- Order: Lepidoptera
- Superfamily: Noctuoidea
- Family: Erebidae
- Subfamily: Arctiinae
- Genus: Calodesma
- Species: C. exposita

Binomial name
- Calodesma exposita (Butler, 1877)

Synonyms
- Stenelopsis exposita Butler, 1877

Species of moth

Calodesma exposita is a moth of the family Erebidae. It was described by Arthur Gardiner Butler in 1877. It is found in Brazil.
