= Calodesma kedar =

Scientific classification
- Domain: Eukaryota
- Kingdom: Animalia
- Phylum: Arthropoda
- Class: Insecta
- Order: Lepidoptera
- Superfamily: Noctuoidea
- Family: Erebidae
- Subfamily: Arctiinae
- Genus: Calodesma
- Species: C. kedar

Binomial name
- Calodesma kedar (H. Druce, 1900)

Synonyms
- Eucyane kedar H. Druce, 1900

Species of moth

Calodesma kedar is a moth of the family Erebidae. It was described by Herbert Druce in 1900. It is found in Colombia.
