= Calodesma plorator =

Scientific classification
- Domain: Eukaryota
- Kingdom: Animalia
- Phylum: Arthropoda
- Class: Insecta
- Order: Lepidoptera
- Superfamily: Noctuoidea
- Family: Erebidae
- Subfamily: Arctiinae
- Genus: Calodesma
- Species: C. plorator

Binomial name
- Calodesma plorator (Kaye, 1922)

Synonyms
- Centronia plorator Kaye, 1922

Species of moth

Calodesma plorator is a moth of the family Erebidae. It was described by William James Kaye in 1922. It is found on Trinidad off the northeastern coast of Venezuela.
