= Calodesma rubricincta =

Scientific classification
- Domain: Eukaryota
- Kingdom: Animalia
- Phylum: Arthropoda
- Class: Insecta
- Order: Lepidoptera
- Superfamily: Noctuoidea
- Family: Erebidae
- Subfamily: Arctiinae
- Genus: Calodesma
- Species: C. rubricincta

Binomial name
- Calodesma rubricincta (Dognin, 1923)

Synonyms
- Centronia rubricincta Dognin, 1923

Species of moth

Calodesma rubricincta is a moth of the family Erebidae. It was described by Paul Dognin in 1923. It is found in Colombia.
