= Calodesma dilutana =

Scientific classification
- Domain: Eukaryota
- Kingdom: Animalia
- Phylum: Arthropoda
- Class: Insecta
- Order: Lepidoptera
- Superfamily: Noctuoidea
- Family: Erebidae
- Subfamily: Arctiinae
- Genus: Calodesma
- Species: C. dilutana

Binomial name
- Calodesma dilutana (H. Druce, 1907)

Synonyms
- Eucyane dilutana H. Druce, 1907

Species of moth

Calodesma dilutana is a moth of the family Erebidae. It was described by Herbert Druce in 1907. It is found in Brazil.
