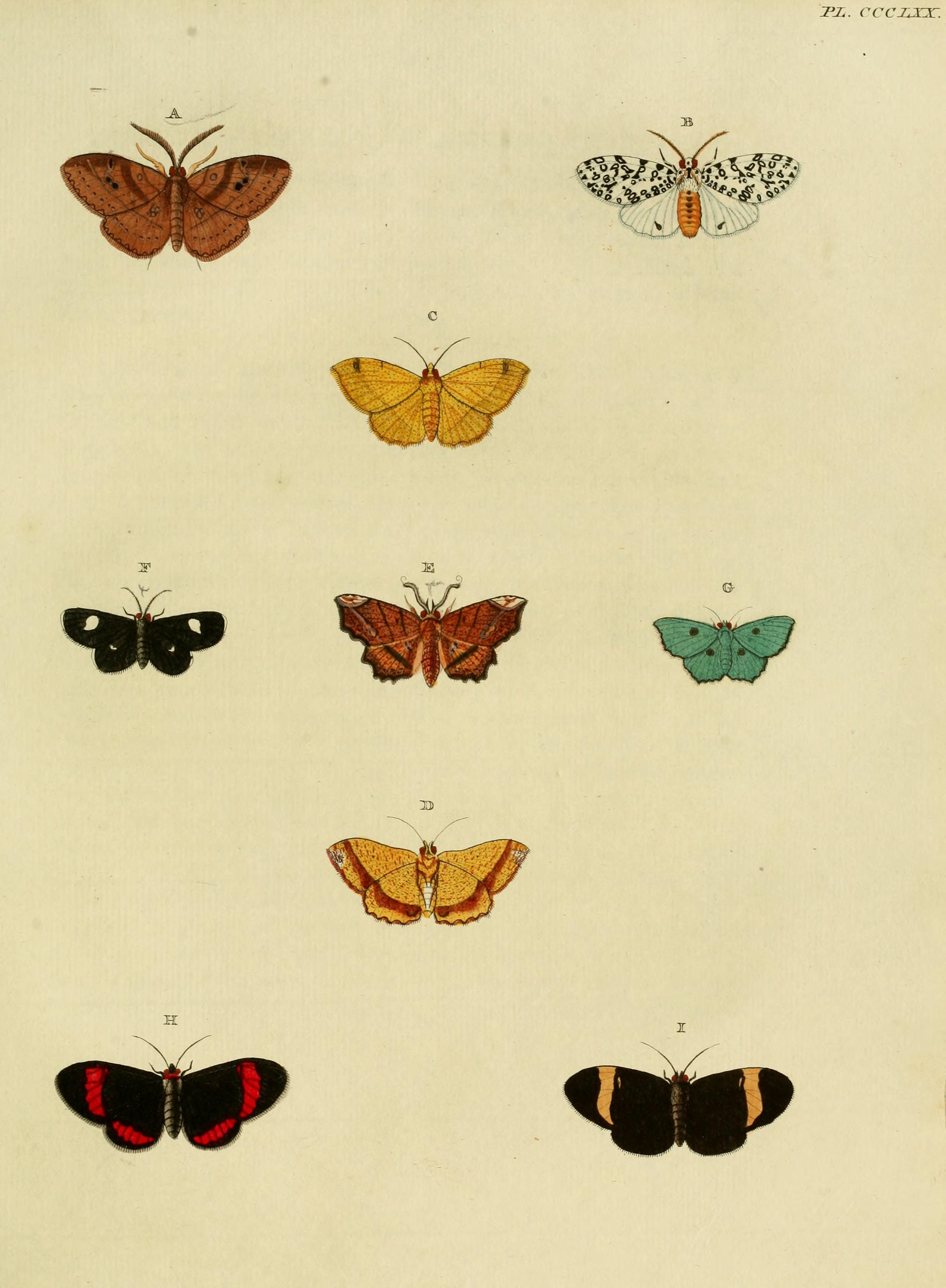

Scientific classification
- Domain: Eukaryota
- Kingdom: Animalia
- Phylum: Arthropoda
- Class: Insecta
- Order: Lepidoptera
- Superfamily: Noctuoidea
- Family: Erebidae
- Subfamily: Arctiinae
- Genus: Calodesma
- Species: C. amica

Binomial name
- Calodesma amica (Stoll, 1781)

Synonyms
- Phalaena amica Stoll, [1781]; Calodesma occidentalis Hering, 1925

= Calodesma amica =

Species of moth

Calodesma amica is a moth of the family Erebidae. It was described by Caspar Stoll in 1781. It is found in Suriname and Ecuador.

== Subspecies ==
- Calodesma amica amica (Surinam)
- Calodesma amica occidentalis Hering, 1925 (Ecuador)
