= Biblical languages =

Languages used in the original writings of the Bible

LZW Scan of the text of the King James Bible performed in ~10m on a RTX 4090.

Biblical languages are any of the languages employed in the original writings of the Bible. Some debate exists as to which language is the original language of a particular passage, and about whether a term has been properly translated from an ancient language into modern editions of the Bible. Scholars generally recognize three languages as original biblical languages: Hebrew, Aramaic, and Koine Greek.

== Language of the Hebrew Bible ==
The Hebrew Bible, also known as the Tanakh (Hebrew: תנ"ך), consists of 24 books. (Note: The 24 books of the Hebrew Bible are the same as the 39 books of the Protestant Old Testament, only divided and ordered differently: the books of the Minor Prophets are in Christian Bibles twelve different books, and in Hebrew Bibles, one book called "The Twelve". Likewise, Christian Bibles divide the Books of Kingdoms into four books, either 1–2 Samuel and 1–2 Kings or 1–4 Kings: Jewish Bibles divide these into two books. The Jews likewise keep 1–2 Chronicles/Paralipomenon as one book. Ezra and Nehemiah are likewise combined in the Jewish Bible, as they are in many Orthodox Bibles, instead of divided into two books, as per the Catholic and Protestant tradition.) "Hebrew" in "Hebrew Bible" may refer to either the Hebrew language or to the Hebrew people who historically used Hebrew as a spoken language, and have continuously used the language in prayer and study, or both. The texts were mainly written in Biblical Hebrew (sometimes called Classical Hebrew), with some portions (notably in Daniel and Ezra) in Biblical Aramaic.

=== Translations ===
The very first translation of the Hebrew Bible was into Greek. This translation is known as the Septuagint (LXX), a name that derives from a legend that seventy separate translators all produced identical texts; this legend was created to promote the authority of this translation. In fact, the development of the Septuagint was a gradual process: it began some time in the 3rd or 2nd century BC, when the first portion of the Hebrew Bible, the Torah, was translated into Koine Greek. Over the next century, other books were translated as well. The Septuagint was widely used by Greek-speaking Jews. It differs somewhat in content from the later standardised Hebrew Bible, known as the Masoretic Text (MT).

Later, for Christians, the Septuagint became the received text of the Old Testament in the Eastern Orthodox Church, and the basis of its canon. The Catholic Church uses the Latin Vulgate by Jerome, which was based upon the Hebrew for those books of the Bible preserved in the Jewish canon (as reflected in the Masoretic Text), and on the Greek text for the rest. Other ancient Jewish translations, such as the Aramaic Targums, conform closely to the Masoretic Text, and all medieval and modern Jewish translations are based upon the same. Christian translations also tend to be based upon the Hebrew, though some denominations prefer the Septuagint (or may cite variant readings from both). Bible translations incorporating modern textual criticism usually begin with the Masoretic Text, but also take into account possible variants from all available ancient versions.

== Languages of the deuterocanonical books ==
The deuterocanonical books have a different status according to various Jewish and Christian denominations, with some considering them canonical, others apocryphal. These books, mostly written between 300 BC and 300 AD, were written in various times, places, contexts and languages by various authors for various reasons. Scholars continue to debate as to which languages each of the deuterocanonicals was originally written. Many of the oldest surviving texts are in Koine Greek, but show features of Semitic languages – usually Semitisms – such as Hebrew or Aramaic, leading some scholars to argue that the original text, even though now lost, may have been written in a Semitic language rather than Greek. In other cases, the Greek seems more fluent and may be considered original. One of the youngest of these books, 2 Esdras, has a complex composition history with a probable mix of Hebrew, Latin and Greek origins.

Deuterocanonical books composition
Book	Dating	Original language (and location)
Letter of Jeremiah	c. 300 BC	Oldest versions Greek, probably originally Hebrew or Aramaic
Psalm 151	c. 300–200 BC	Hebrew (Psalms 151a+b), later merged into Koine Greek Psalm 151
1 Esdras	c. 200–140 BC	Probably Greek in Egypt, possibly from a 3rd-century Semitic original
Sirach	c. 180–175 BC	Hebrew in Jerusalem
Tobit	c. 225–175 or 175–164 BC	Probably Aramaic, possibly Hebrew, possibly in Antioch
Wisdom of Solomon	c. 150 BC	Most probably Koine Greek in Alexandria
Judith	c. 150–100 BC	Oldest versions Greek, originally probably Hebrew, possibly Greek
2 Maccabees	c. 150–120 BC	Koine Greek
1 Maccabees	c. 135–103 BC	Oldest versions Greek, original probably Hebrew, probably in Jerusalem
Additions to Daniel	c. 100 BC	Oldest versions Greek, originally Semitic or Greek
Prayer of Manasseh	c. 200 BC – AD 50	Oldest versions Greek, originally probably Greek, possibly Semitic
Baruch	c. 200–100 BC (1:1–3:38) c. 100 BC – AD 100 (3:39–5:9)	(1:1–3:38) Koine Greek, probably originally Hebrew (3:39–5:9) Koine Greek, possibly originally Hebrew or Aramaic
3 Maccabees	c. 100–50 BC	Koine Greek, probably in Alexandria
Additions to Esther	c. 100–1 BC	Koine Greek in Alexandria
4 Maccabees	c. AD 18–55	Koine Greek, probably outside Israel
2 Esdras	c. AD 90–100 (4 Ezra) c. AD 100–300 (5 Ezra) c. AD 200–300 (6 Ezra)	4 Ezra (2 Esdras 3–14): probably Hebrew by a Jew; 5 Ezra (2 Esdras 1–2): probably Latin by a Christian; 6 Ezra (2 Esdras 15–16): probably Greek by a Levantine Christian
Odes	c. AD 400–440	Codex Alexandrinus is the oldest version. Medieval Greek, prior history unknown

== Languages of the New Testament ==
The books of the Christian New Testament are widely agreed to have originally been written in Greek, specifically Koine Greek, even though some authors often included translations from Hebrew and Aramaic texts. Certainly the Pauline Epistles were written in Greek for Greek-speaking audiences. See Greek primacy for further details. Koine Greek was the popular form of Greek which emerged in post-classical antiquity (c. 300 BC – 300 AD), and marks the third period in the history of the Greek language. It is also called Alexandrian, Hellenistic, Common, or New Testament Greek.

Some scholars believe that some books of the Greek New Testament (in particular, the Gospel of Matthew) are actually translations of a Hebrew or Aramaic original. A famous example of this is the opening to the Gospel of John, which some scholars argue to be a Greek translation of an Aramaic hymn. Of these, a small number accept the Syriac Peshitta as representative of the original. See Aramaic primacy.

Likewise, some traditional Roman Catholic scholars believed the Gospel of Mark was originally written in Latin. However, the received text of the New Testament is Greek and nearly all translations are based upon the Greek text.
