= Biblical apocrypha =

Ancient books found in some editions of Bibles

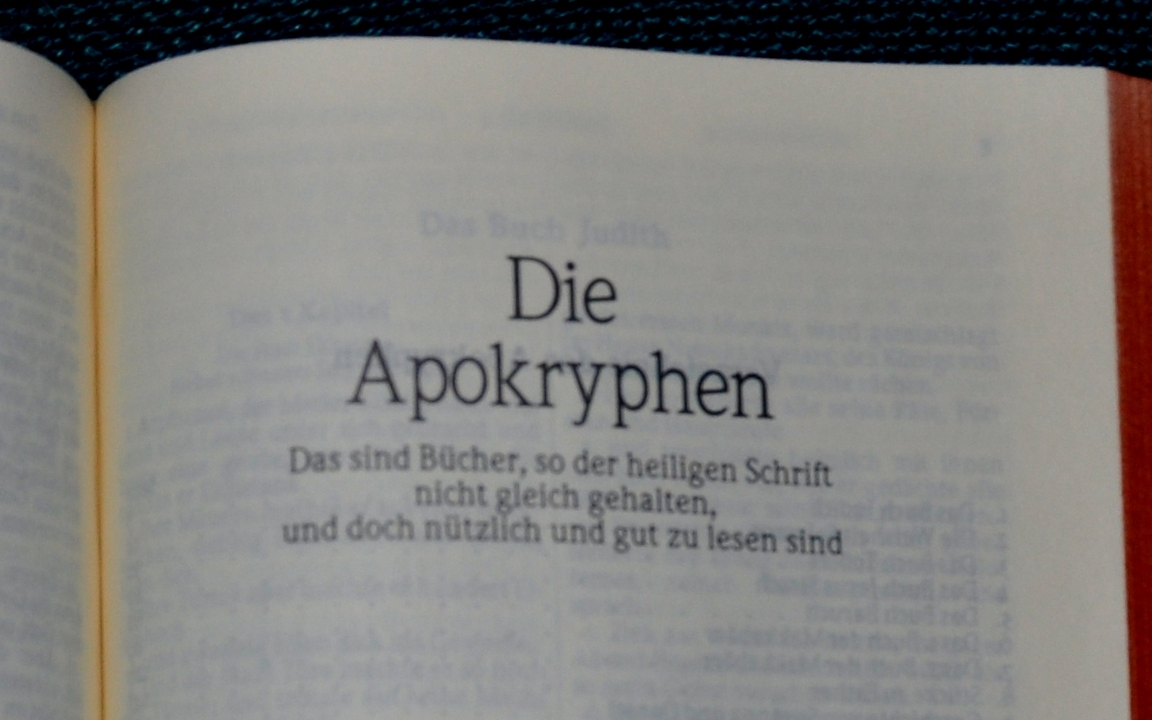
Copies of the Luther Bible include the intertestamental books between the Old Testament and New Testament; they are termed the "Apocrypha" in Christian denominations having their origins in the Reformation.

The Biblical apocrypha (from Ancient Greek ἀπόκρυφος (apókryphos) 'hidden') denotes the collection of ancient books, some of which are believed by some to be of doubtful origin, thought to have been written some time between 200 BC and 100 AD.

The Catholic Church, Eastern Orthodox Church, Oriental Orthodox Churches, and Assyrian Church of the East include some or all of the same texts within the body of their version of the Old Testament, with Catholics terming them deuterocanonical books. Traditional 80-book Protestant Bibles include fourteen books in an intertestamental section between the Old Testament and New Testament called the Apocrypha, deeming these useful for instruction, but non-canonical. Reflecting this view, the lectionaries of the Lutheran Churches and Anglican Communion include readings from the Apocrypha.

== Acceptance ==
It was in Luther's Bible of 1534 that the Apocrypha was first published as a separate intertestamental section. The preface to the Apocrypha in the Geneva Bible claimed that while these books "were not received by a common consent to be read and expounded publicly in the Church", and did not serve "to prove any point of Christian religion save in so much as they had the consent of the other scriptures called canonical to confirm the same", nonetheless, "as books proceeding from godly men they were received to be read for the advancement and furtherance of the knowledge of history and for the instruction of godly manners." Later, during the English Civil War, the Westminster Confession of 1647 excluded the Apocrypha from the canon and made no recommendation of the Apocrypha above "other human writings", and this attitude toward the Apocrypha is represented by the decision of the British and Foreign Bible Society in the early 19th century not to print it. Today, English Bibles with the Apocrypha are becoming more popular again, and they are often printed as intertestamental books.

Many of these texts are considered canonical Old Testament books by the Catholic Church, affirmed by the Council of Rome (382), Synod of Hippo (393) and Councils of Carthage (397), and later reaffirmed by the Council of Trent (1545–1563); and by the Eastern Orthodox Church which are referred to as anagignoskomena per the Synod of Jerusalem (1672).

The Lutheran Churches normatively include in the Bible the Apocrypha as an intertestamental section between the Old Testament and the New Testament. Of the Old Testamental Apocrypha, Martin Luther said, "These books are not held equal to the Scriptures, but are useful and good to read" (AE 35:337). The Book of Concord, the compendium of Evangelical Lutheran doctrine, quotes Tobit 4:10 and cites 2 Maccabees 15:14. The systematic theologian Martin Chemnitz, a leading figure in the development of Evangelical Lutheranism, cites Sirach 38:25-26 as helpful. Chemnitz also separates Old Testament Scripture into two categories: canonical and apocryphal. The Dietrich Catechism, once widely used in Evangelical Lutheranism, affirms that apart from the canonical books, the Bible does contain the apocrypha.

The Anglican Communion accepts "the Apocrypha for instruction in life and manners, but not for the establishment of doctrine (Article VI in the Thirty-Nine Articles)", and many "lectionary readings in The Book of Common Prayer are taken from the Apocrypha", with these lessons being "read in the same ways as those from the Old Testament". The first Methodist liturgical book, The Sunday Service of the Methodists, employs verses from the Apocrypha, such as in the Eucharistic liturgy. The Protestant Apocrypha contains three books (1 Esdras, 2 Esdras and the Prayer of Manasseh) that are accepted by many Eastern Orthodox Churches and Oriental Orthodox Churches as canonical, but are regarded as non-canonical by the Catholic Church and are therefore not included in modern Catholic Bibles.

As of 1981, the Apocrypha are "included in the lectionaries of Anglican and Lutheran Churches". Anabaptists use the Luther Bible, which contains the Apocrypha as intertestamental books; Amish wedding ceremonies include "the retelling of the marriage of Tobias and Sarah in the Apocrypha". Moreover, the Revised Common Lectionary, in use by most mainline Protestants including Methodists and Moravians, lists readings from the Apocrypha in the liturgical calendar, although alternate Old Testament scripture lessons are provided.

== Vulgate prologues ==
Jerome completed his translation of the Bible, the Latin Vulgate, in 405. The Vulgate manuscripts included prologues, in which Jerome clearly identified certain books of the older Old Latin Old Testament version as apocryphal – or non-canonical – even though they might be read as scripture.

In the prologue to the books of Samuel and Kings, which is often called the Prologus Galeatus, he says:

This preface to the Scriptures may serve as a "helmeted" introduction to all the books which we turn from Hebrew into Latin, so that we may be assured that what is not found in our list must be placed amongst the Apocryphal writings. Wisdom, therefore, which generally bears the name of Solomon, and the book of Jesus, the Son of Sirach, and Judith, and Tobias, and the Shepherd are not in the canon. The first book of Maccabees I have found to be Hebrew, the second is Greek, as can be proved from the very style.

In the prologue to Ezra, Jerome states that the third book and fourth book of Ezra are apocryphal; while the two books of Ezra in the Vetus Latina version, translating 1 Esdras and 2 Esdras of the Septuagint, are 'variant examples' of the same Hebrew original.

In his prologue to the books of Solomon, he says:

Also included is the book of the model of virtue (πᾰνάρετος) Jesus son of Sirach, and another falsely ascribed work (ψευδεπῐ́γρᾰφος) which is titled Wisdom of Solomon. The former of these I have also found in Hebrew, titled not Ecclesiasticus as among the Latins, but Parables, to which were joined Ecclesiastes and Song of Songs, as though it made of equal worth the likeness not only of the number of the books of Solomon, but also the kind of subjects. The second was never among the Hebrews, the very style of which reeks of Greek eloquence. And none of the ancient scribes affirm this one is of Philo Judaeus. Therefore, just as the Church also reads the books of Judith, Tobias, and the Maccabees, but does not receive them among the canonical Scriptures, so also one may read these two scrolls for the strengthening of the people, (but) not for confirming the authority of ecclesiastical dogmas.

He mentions the book of Baruch in his prologue to Jeremiah but does not include it as 'apocrypha'; stating that "it is neither read nor held among the Hebrews".

In his prologue to Judith he mentions that "among the Hebrews, the authority [of Judith] came into contention", but that it was "counted in the number of Sacred Scriptures" by the First Council of Nicaea. In his reply to Rufinus, he affirmed that he was consistent with the choice of the church regarding which version of the deuterocanonical portions of Daniel to use, which the Jews of his day did not include:

What sin have I committed in following the judgment of the churches? But when I repeat what the Jews say against the Story of Susanna and the Hymn of the Three Children, and the fables of Bel and the Dragon, which are not contained in the Hebrew Bible, the man who makes this a charge against me proves himself to be a fool and a slanderer; for I explained not what I thought but what they commonly say against us. (Against Rufinus, II:33 (AD 402)).

According to Michael Barber, although Jerome was once suspicious of the apocrypha, he later viewed them as Scripture as shown in his epistles. Barber cites Jerome's letter to Eustochium, in which Jerome quotes Sirach 13:2.; elsewhere Jerome also refers to Baruch, the Story of Susannah and Wisdom as scripture.

== Apocrypha in editions of the Bible ==
The contents page in a complete 80-book King James Bible, listing "The Books of the Old Testament", "The Books called Apocrypha", and "The Books of the New Testament".

Apocrypha are well attested in surviving manuscripts of the Christian Bible. (See, for example, Codex Vaticanus, Codex Sinaiticus, Codex Alexandrinus, Vulgate, and Peshitta.) After the Lutheran and Catholic canons were defined by Luther (c. 1534) and Trent (8 April 1546) respectively, early Protestant editions of the Bible (notably the 1545 Luther Bible in German and 1611 King James Version in English) did not omit these books, but placed them in a separate Apocrypha section in between the Old and New Testaments to indicate their status.

=== Gutenberg Bible ===
This famous edition of the Vulgate was published in 1455. Like the manuscripts on which it was based, the Gutenberg Bible lacks a specific Apocrypha section. Its Old Testament includes the books that Jerome considered apocryphal and those Pope Clement VIII later moved to the appendix. The Prayer of Manasseh is located after the Books of Chronicles, 3 and 4 Esdras follow 2 Esdras (Nehemiah), and Prayer of Solomon follows Ecclesiasticus.

=== Luther Bible ===
Martin Luther translated the Bible into German during the early part of the 16th century, first releasing a complete Bible in 1534. His bible was the first major edition to have a separate section containing the apocrypha. Books and portions of books not found in the Masoretic Text of Judaism were moved out of the body of the Old Testament to this section. Luther placed these books between the Old and New Testaments. For this reason, these works are sometimes known as inter-testamental books. The books 1 and 2 Esdras were omitted entirely. Luther was making a polemical point about the canonicity of these books. As an authority for this division, he cited Jerome, who in the early 5th century distinguished the Hebrew Bible and Septuagint, stating that books not found in Hebrew were not received as canonical.

Although his statement was controversial in his day, Jerome was later titled a Doctor of the Church and his authority was also cited in the Anglican statement in 1571 of the Thirty-nine Articles.

Luther also expressed some doubts about the canonicity of four New Testament books, although he never called them apocrypha: the Epistle to the Hebrews, the Epistles of James and Jude, and the Revelation to John. He did not put them in a separately named section, but he did move them to the end of his New Testament.

=== Clementine Vulgate ===
In 1592, Pope Clement VIII published his revised edition of the Vulgate, referred to as the Sixto-Clementine Vulgate. He moved three books not found in the canon of the Council of Trent from the Old Testament into an appendix "lest they utterly perish" (ne prorsus interirent).

- Prayer of Manasseh
- 3 Esdras (1 Esdras in the King James Bible)
- 4 Esdras (2 Esdras in the King James Bible)

The protocanonical and deuterocanonical books he placed in their traditional positions in the Old Testament.

=== King James Version ===
The English-language King James Version (KJV) of 1611 placed the books in an inter-testamental section labelled "the Books called Apocrypha". The section contains the following:

- The Third Book of Esdras
- The Fourth Book of Esdras
- The Book of Tobias
- The Book of Judith
- The rest of the Book of Esther
- The Book of Wisdom
- Jesus the Son of Sirach (also known as Ecclesiasticus)
- Baruch the Prophet (Includes the Epistle of Jeremiah as chapter 6)
- The Story of Susanna
- The Song of the Three Children
- Of Bel and the Dragon
- The Prayer of Manasses
- The First Book of Maccabees
- The Second Book of Maccabees

(Included in this list are those books of the Clementine Vulgate that were not in Luther's canon).

These are the books most frequently referred to by the casual appellation "the books called Apocrypha". These same books are also listed in Article VI of the Thirty-Nine Articles of the Church of England as "the other books". Despite being placed in the Apocrypha, in the table of lessons at the front of some printings of the King James Bible, these books are included under the Old Testament.

=== The Bible and the Puritan revolution ===
The British Puritan revolution of the 1600s brought a change in the way many British publishers handled the apocryphal material associated with the Bible. The Puritans used the standard of Sola Scriptura (Scripture Alone) to determine which books would be included in the canon. The Westminster Confession of Faith, composed during the British Civil Wars (1642–1651), excluded the Apocrypha from the canon. The Confession provided the rationale for the exclusion: 'The books commonly called Apocrypha, not being of divine inspiration, are no part of the canon of the Scripture, and therefore are of no authority in the church of God, nor to be any otherwise approved, or made use of, than other human writings' (1.3). Thus, Bibles printed by English Protestants who separated from the Church of England began to exclude these books.

=== Other early Bible editions ===
All English translations of the Bible printed in the sixteenth century included a section or appendix for Apocryphal books. Matthew's Bible, published in 1537, contains all the Apocrypha of the later King James Version in an inter-testamental section. The 1538 Myles Coverdale Bible contained an Apocrypha that excluded Baruch and the Prayer of Manasseh. The 1560 Geneva Bible placed the Prayer of Manasseh after 2 Chronicles; the rest of the Apocrypha were placed in an inter-testamental section. The Douay-Rheims Bible (1582–1609) placed the Prayer of Manasseh and 3 and 4 Esdras into an Appendix of the second volume of the Old Testament.

In the Zürich Bible (1529–30), they are placed in an Appendix. They include 3 Maccabees, along with 1 Esdras & 2 Esdras. The 1st edition omitted the Prayer of Manasseh and the Rest of Esther, although these were included in the 2nd edition. The French Bible (1535) of Pierre Robert Olivétan placed them between the Testaments, with the subtitle, "The volume of the apocryphal books contained in the Vulgate translation, which we have not found in the Hebrew or Chaldee".

In 1569 the Spanish Reina Bible, following the example of the pre-Clementine Latin Vulgate, contained the deuterocanonical books in its Old Testament. Following the other Protestant translations of its day, Valera's 1602 revision of the Reina Bible moved these books into an inter-testamental section.

=== Modern editions ===
All King James Bibles published before 1666 included the Apocrypha, though separately to denote them as not equal to Scripture proper, as noted by Jerome in the Vulgate, to which he gave the name, "The Apocrypha". In 1826, the National Bible Society of Scotland petitioned the British and Foreign Bible Society not to print the Apocrypha, resulting in a decision that no BFBS funds were to pay for printing any Apocryphal books anywhere. They reasoned that not printing the Apocrypha within the Bible would prove to be less costly to produce. Since that time most modern editions of the Bible and reprintings of the King James Bible omit the Apocrypha section. Modern non-Catholic reprintings of the Clementine Vulgate commonly omit the Apocrypha section. Many reprintings of older versions of the Bible now omit the apocrypha and many newer translations and revisions have never included them at all.

There are some exceptions to this trend, however. Some editions of the Revised Standard Version, New Revised Standard Version and the English Standard Version of the Bible include not only the Apocrypha listed above, but also 3 Maccabees, 4 Maccabees, and Psalm 151.

The American Bible Society lifted restrictions on the publication of Bibles with the Apocrypha in 1964. The British and Foreign Bible Society followed in 1966. The Stuttgart Vulgate (the printed edition, not most of the on-line editions), which is published by the UBS, contains the Clementine Apocrypha as well as the Epistle to the Laodiceans and Psalm 151.

Brenton's edition of the Septuagint includes all of the Apocrypha found in the King James Bible with the exception of 2 Esdras, which was not in the Septuagint and is no longer extant in Greek. He places them in a separate section at the end of his Old Testament, following English tradition.

In Greek circles, however, these books are not traditionally called Apocrypha, but Anagignoskomena (ἀναγιγνωσκόμενα), and are integrated into the Old Testament. The Orthodox Study Bible, published by Thomas Nelson Publishers, includes the Anagignoskomena in its Old Testament, with the exception of 4 Maccabees. This was translated by the Saint Athanasius Academy of Orthodox Theology, from the Rahlfs Edition of the Septuagint using Brenton's English translation and the RSV Expanded Apocrypha as their standardized text. As such, they are included in the Old Testament with no distinction between these books and the rest of the Old Testament. This follows the tradition of the Eastern Orthodox Church where the Septuagint is the received version of Old Testament scripture, considered itself inspired in agreement with some of the Fathers, such as St Augustine, rather than the Hebrew Masoretic Text followed by all other modern translations.

=== Anagignoskomena ===
The Septuagint, the ancient and best known Greek version of the Old Testament, contains books and additions that are not present in the Hebrew Bible. These texts are not traditionally segregated into a separate section, nor are they usually called apocrypha. Rather, they are referred to as the Anagignoskomena (ἀναγιγνωσκόμενα, "things that are read" or "profitable reading"). The anagignoskomena are Tobit, Judith, Wisdom of Solomon, Wisdom of Jesus ben Sira (Sirach), Baruch, Letter of Jeremiah (in the Vulgate this is chapter 6 of Baruch), additions to Daniel (The Prayer of Azarias, Susanna and Bel and the Dragon), additions to Esther, 1 Maccabees, 2 Maccabees, 3 Maccabees, 1 Esdras, i.e. all of the Deuterocanonical books plus 3 Maccabees and 1 Esdras.

Some editions add additional books, such as Psalm 151 or the Odes (including the Prayer of Manasseh). 2 Esdras is added as an appendix in the Slavonic Bibles and 4 Maccabees as an appendix in Greek editions.

== Pseudepigrapha ==
Technically, a pseudepigraphon is a book written in a biblical style and ascribed to an author who did not write it. In common usage, however, the term pseudepigrapha is often used by way of distinction to refer to apocryphal writings that do not appear in printed editions of the Bible, as opposed to the texts listed above. Examples include:

- Apocalypse of Abraham
- Apocalypse of Moses
- Letter of Aristeas
- Martyrdom and Ascension of Isaiah
- Joseph and Aseneth
- Life of Adam and Eve
- Lives of the Prophets
- Ladder of Jacob
- Jannes and Jambres
- History of the Captivity in Babylon
- History of the Rechabites
- Eldad and Medad
- History of Joseph the Carpenter
- Odes of Solomon
- Prayer of Joseph
- Prayer of Jacob
- Vision of Ezra

Often included among the pseudepigrapha are 3 and 4 Maccabees because they are not traditionally found in western Bibles, although they are in the Septuagint. Similarly, the Book of Enoch, Book of Jubilees and 4 Baruch are often listed with the pseudepigrapha although they are commonly included in Ethiopian Bibles. The Psalms of Solomon are found in some editions of the Septuagint.

== Cultural impact ==
- The introitus, "Eternal rest grant unto them, O Lord, and let perpetual light shine upon them", of the traditional Requiem in the Catholic Church is loosely based on 4 Esdras 2:34–35.
- The alternative introitus for Quasimodo Sunday in the Roman rite of the Catholic Church is loosely based on 4 Esdras 2:36–37.
- The Story of Susanna is perhaps the earliest example of a courtroom drama, and perhaps the first example of an effective forensic cross-examination (there are no others in the Bible: except perhaps Solomon's judgement at 1 Kings 3:25).
- Bel and the Dragon is perhaps the earliest example of a locked room mystery.
- Shylock's reference in The Merchant of Venice to "A Daniel come to judgment; yea, a Daniel!" refers to the story of Susanna and the elders.
- The theme of the elders surprising Susanna in her bath is a common one in art, such as in paintings by Tintoretto and Artemisia Gentileschi, and in Wallace Stevens' poem Peter Quince at the Clavier.
- Let Us Now Praise Famous Men, the title of James Agee's 1941 chronicle of Alabama sharecroppers, was taken from Ecclesiasticus 44:1: "Let us now praise famous men, and our fathers that begat us."
- In his spiritual autobiography Grace Abounding to the Chief of Sinners, John Bunyan recounts how God strengthened him against the temptation to despair of his salvation by inspiring him with the words, "Look at the generations of old and see: did any ever trust in God, and were confounded?"

At which I was greatly encouraged in my soul. ... So coming home, I presently went to my Bible, to see if I could find that saying, not doubting but to find it presently. ... Thus I continued above a year, and could not find the place; but at last, casting my eye upon the Apocrypha books, I found it in Ecclesiasticus, chap. ii. 10. This, at the first, did somewhat daunt me; because it was not in those texts that we call holy and canonical; yet, as this sentence was the sum and substance of many of the promises, it was my duty to take the comfort of it; and I bless God for that word, for it was of good to me. That word doth still ofttimes shine before my face.

== See also ==
- Deuterocanonical books
- Jewish apocrypha
- New Testament apocrypha
- Pseudepigrapha
- Non-canonical books referenced in the Bible
