= Book of Odes =

The Book of Odes may refer to one of the following:

- The Chinese Classic of Poetry or Shi Jing
- The Christian Book of Odes (Bible)
- The Arabic Kitab al-Aghani
