= The Satire of the Trades =

Didactic work of ancient Egyptian literature

19th Dynasty ostrakon inscribed with part of the Satire of the trades. Turin, Museo Egizio

The Satire of the Trades, also called The Instruction of Kheti, is a didactic work of ancient Egyptian literature. It takes the form of an instruction and was composed by a scribe from Sile named Kheti for his son Pepi. The Satire exalts the career of a scribe while remarking on the drudgery experienced in other professions. Laborers are described in the document as having tired arms and to be living in subpar conditions. This poor standard of living is juxtaposed with the life of a scribe, whose job is "greater than any profession". Egyptologists disagree on whether or not the text is satirical. The same Kheti may have composed the Instructions of Amenemhat, but this is unclear.

The entirety of the document survives on the Papyrus Sallier II at the British Museum (Museum number EA10182,11), but it is extremely corrupted. Some fragments are kept at the British Museum, the Louvre, the Morgan Library & Museum, and other institutions. This instruction is referenced by Ben Sira in the Deuterocanonical Book of Sirach at Sirach 38:24–39:11.

== Sources ==
The Satire survives on various papyri, writing boards, and ostraca. The abundant evidence of this text stems from it commonly being copied in scribal schools. Many of the surviving copies contain numerous errors on account of poor copying by aspiring scribes. Wolfgang Helk's translation is the most current and most used. The document was named by Gaston Maspero.

== Description ==
Written during the Middle Kingdom of Egypt, the text presents a long speech from a man named Kheti to his son, Pepi, on the merits of being a scribe. Kheti tells his son that he has seen "a man seized for his labor" and has witnessed commoners suffer from "violent beatings". Pepi is told he can avoid this by directing his heart to writing. The majority of The Satire hyperbolically describes the undesirability and toil in other lines of work. Kheti warns his son about the hardships endured by smiths, masons, potters, and many other professions. The following excerpt describing the life of a "builder of walls" is representative of the middle section of The Satire: "His apron is mere rags and the rest-house far behind him. His arms are dead from wielding the chisel, and every measurement is wrong; He eats his food with his fingers and washes once a day."

Kheti proceeds to offer suggestions for how Pepi ought to act in scribe school. Pepi is told to "be serious", to "avoid places of ill fame", and to "study many things". Before closing, Kheti once more extolls the duties of the scribe and then celebrates the career path Pepi has begun.

== Use in scribal schools ==
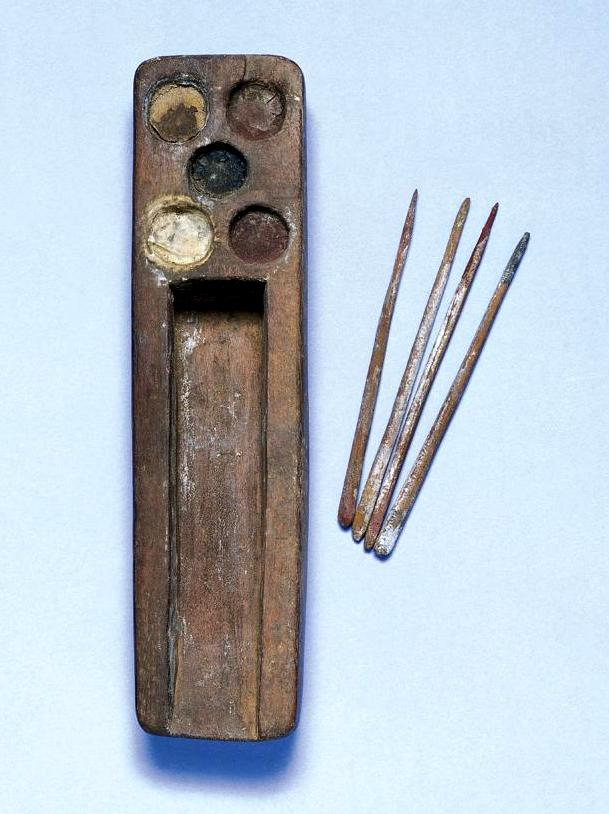
This ancient Egyptian scribe's palette is estimated to be from 1500-500 BCE.

The Satire of the Trades is a "schoolboy text", meaning it was used to teach young scribes the values and tasks required for the profession. Scribes in training were expected to memorize and inscribe passages from the text as a pedagogical method. A surviving ostracon of The Satire with writing from two different hands, one skilled and one amateurish, allows for insight into how scribes were taught. An experienced scribe would write one section of the text and the beginning of the next one. The scribe in training would pick up where his teacher left off and complete the unfinished verse. This was a test of both memory and writing. The Satire was among the most copied texts in Theban scribal schools during the Twentieth Dynasty (1189–1077 BCE).

== Interpretation ==
Since being named the Satire des Métiers by Gaston Maspero, the work has typically been understood as a satire. Yet, some Egyptologists contest this categorization. Chris Rollston argues that the text should be understood as "scribal propaganda". He suggests the writing was not intended to demonstrate actual scribal views, but was meant to be both exaggerative and funny in order to entice and retain young men into the profession. Wolfgang Helk agrees with Rollston that it is not satire. Miriam Lichtheim holds the view that the work is indeed satirical. Lichtheim argues that the "exaggeration and lightness of tone" indicate satirical intent. Further, Lichtheim posits that if this work is not satirical, it would demonstrate scribal disdain for laborers. This would be out of keeping with other teachings like Ptahhotep's instruction and The Loyalist Teaching, both of which demanded respect for manual workers. William K. Simpson suggests that the writing does not belong within the tradition of satire even though it does have elements thereof.
