= Prologus Galeatus =

Preface by Saint Jerome to his Vulgate translations of I and II Kings and I and II Samuel

Extract from the preface, with the passage which gave it its nickname underlined in red, in the Patrologia Latina, v. 28.

The Prologus Galaetus or Galeatum principium (lit. and traditionally translated as "helmeted prologue"; or sometimes translated as "helmeted preface") is a preface by Jerome, dated 391–392, to his translation of the Liber Regum (the book of Kings composed of four parts: the first and second books of Samuel and the first and second books of Kings).

In this text, Jerome affirms his opposition to the books of the Old Testament which are outside the Hebrew canon. Jerome writes: "This prologue to the Scriptures may be appropriate as a helmeted introduction [galeatum principium] to all the books which we turn from Hebrew into Latin, so we may be able to know whatever is outside of these is set aside among the apocrypha. Therefore, Wisdom, which is commonly ascribed to Solomon, and the book of Jesus son of Sirach, and Judith and Tobias, and The Shepherd are not in the canon. I have found the First Book of the Maccabees (is) Hebrew, the Second is Greek, which may also be proven by their styles."

== About the Hebrew canon ==
In this prologue Jerome mentioned the grouping, number, and order of the Hebrew Bible:

- Law consists five books: Genesis, Exodus, Leviticus, Numbers, Deuteronomy
- Prophets consists eight books: Joshua, Judges (includes Ruth), Samuel, Kings, Isaiah, Jeremiah (includes Lamentations), Ezekiel, Twelve Prophets
- Hagiographa consists nine books: Job, Psalms, Proverbs, Ecclesiastes, Song of Songs, Daniel, Chronicles, Ezra, Esther

When he counted, the books of Samuel and Kings were not divided in two. Ezra and Nehemiah were not separated either at the time. Also, he mentioned "some include Ruth and Lamentations amongst the Hagiographa."

== See also ==
- Vulgate
