= Roy Kinneer Patteson Jr. =

American academic

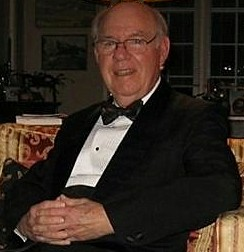
- Born: October 27, 1928; Richmond, Virginia, U.S.
- Died: August 31, 2012 (aged 83); Harrisonburg, Virginia, U.S.

Academic background
- Influences: Woodford B. Hackley, his Latin professor at Richmond

Academic work
- Era: Current / Modern
- Notable works: PhD dissertation on the Wisdom of Ben Sira (1967); Definitive work on the origin of the alphabet (1970)

Roy Kinneer Patteson Jr. was an American scholar whose knowledge of Biblical Hebrew, Aramaic, Syriac and Hellenistic Greek enabled him to undertake an analysis of the text of the Ben Sira Scroll discovered at Masada in Palestine in 1964. His research resulted in the establishment of a critical Hebrew text for portions of the Book of Sirach, which dates to the first century BC.

== Early life ==
Roy Kinneer Patteson was born to Roy Kinneer Patteson Sr. and Mary Anderson Patteson, of English, Irish and French ancestry. He graduated from Midlothian High School in 1947.

== Early career, higher education and noted scholarly contributions ==
After his first year at the University of Virginia, Patteson served as a draftsman at Fort Scott in San Francisco and later at Camp Hood, Texas. He also served three years in the Virginia National Guard. In 1950, he and his wife, Pauline Cox Patteson, were married.

Patteson entered the University of Richmond, earning the BA degree in 1957. Thereafter he enrolled in Union Theological Seminary and earned the Bachelor of Divinity degree in 1961. He was ordained as a Minister in the Presbyterian Church (USA) and served a local church in Greensboro, North Carolina, and later two churches in Chatham County, North Carolina. With the encouragement of his congregations he enrolled at Duke Divinity School for graduate study in Biblical Languages and Literature. He received the Master of Theology degree in 1964 and the Ph.D. degree in 1967. His major focus was on the transmission of ancient texts in Hebrew, Aramaic, Syriac and Greek.

During his doctoral studies, Patteson had developed an interest in the first-century BC book the Wisdom of Ben Sira. Prior to 1964, the only extant Hebrew text of this book was known from the Cairo Geniza collection. Many scholars believed that the Cairo Geniza Hebrew text might be a retroversion text, taken from an earlier and more reliable text in Greek. What was needed was a means to evaluate the Cairo Geniza Hebrew readings and to help solve questions about the relationships between the Cairo Geniza Hebrew text and the newly discovered scroll, as well as that scroll's relationship to the versions in Greek, Syriac and Latin.

On April 8, 1964, while archaeologists were excavating at Masada, Herod's palace, they unearthed a Hebrew manuscript, datable to about 100 BC, which could provide a means to evaluate the Cairo Geniza Hebrew text. Patteson contacted Dr. Patrick Shehan and Dr. Alexander Di Lella at Catholic University who provided him with hand-made transcriptions of the Masada fragments of the Ben Sirah scroll. The reception of these early inscriptions, six months prior to the publication of photographic images, greatly advanced Patteson's work. As a result of his research, Patteson concluded that there is no other Hebrew text standing between the Cairo Geniza text and the autograph. The basic integrity of the Cairo Giniza Greek text was also established. In most instances the marginal readings in the Cairo Geniza text could be explained. The relationship between the Syriac version was not clear and more study of that version would be required. Patteson's findings are detailed in his doctoral dissertation, "A Study of the Hebrew Text of Sirach 39:27 to 41:24", which is available for study in the Duke University Library. Patteson's other interests included the origin of the alphabet, the pronunciation of ancient Hebrew, Martin Luther's work as a translator of the Hebrew biblical text, and evidence of Aramaic originals underlying the Greek text of the four gospels. Patteson's work "The Siloam Inscription and Alphabetic Origins" was published by Case Western Press in 1970.

== College administration ==
Patteson served at Peace College as head of the department of social studies and at Davidson County Community College as an instructor in History and as the Academic Dean. These posts led Patteson to greater involvement in administrative matters. Thereafter he served as president at Southern Seminary (now Southern Virginia University) in Buena Vista, Virginia, then as vice president for Development at Mary Baldwin College. In 1977, he became president at King College, serving in a transitional post until a new board of trustees assumed governance of the college. A major focus of Patteson's administrative duties was the development of financial resources to support current programs, financial aid for students, building projects, and securing permanent endowment funds.

== Post-retirement ==
Patteson was granted the status of Honorable Retirement in 1991 by the Presbyterian Church (USA). He was cited for his faithfulness to his calling as a minister through his work in ministry, teaching, and administration. He and his wife have been avid artists whose paintings have won many awards. In 1998, 1999, and 2004, his paintings were selected for the Oil Painters of America's juried national exhibitions at Washington, D.C.; Scottsdale, Arizona; and Kirkland, Washington. He died on August 31, 2012, at the age of 83.
