= Synod of Hippo =

4th-century church council

The Synod of Hippo refers to the synod of 393 which was hosted in Hippo Regius in modern day Algeria, northern Africa during the early Christian Church. Additional synods were held in 394, 397, 401 and 426. Some were attended by Augustine of Hippo.

The synod of 393 is best known for two distinct acts. First, for the first time a council of bishops listed and approved a Christian Biblical canon that corresponds to the modern Catholic canon while falling short of the Eastern Orthodox canon. The canon list approved at Hippo included books later classed by Catholics as deuterocanonical books and by Protestants as Apocrypha. The canon list was later approved at the Council of Carthage (397) pending ratification by the "Church across the sea", that is, the See of Rome. Previous councils had approved similar, but slightly different, canons.

The council also reaffirmed the apostolic origin of the requirement of clerical continence and reasserted it as a requirement for all the ordained, in addition requiring that all members of a person's household must be Christian before that person can be ordained. Rules regarding clerical succession were also clarified at the synod, as well as certain liturgical considerations.

== Canonical Scriptures ==
The canonical scriptures are listed in the Canon XXIV as follows:

Genesis, Exodus, Leviticus, Numbers, Deuteronomy, Joshua the son of Nun, The Judges, Ruth, Kings iv books [1 Samuel, 2 Samuel, 1 Kings, 2 Kings], The Chronicles ii books, Job, the Psalter, five books of Solomon [Proverbs, Ecclesiastes, Song of Songs, Wisdom of Solomon, and Ecclesiasticus], the Twelve Books of the Prophets [Hosea, Joel, Amos, Obadiah, Jonah, Micah, Nahum, Habakkuk, Zephaniah, Haggai, Zechariah, Malachi], Isaiah, Jeremiah, Ezechiel, Daniel, Tobit, Judith, Esther, Ezra ii books, Maccabees ii books.
Of the New Testament:
The Gospels iv books, Acts of the Apostles i book, Epistles of Paul xiv, Epistles of Peter, the Apostle ii, Epistles of John the Apostle iii, Epistles of James the Apostle i, one of Epistle of Jude the Apostle, Revelation of John, i.

The "five books of Solomon", according to Augustine, were Proverbs, Ecclesiastes, Song of Songs, Wisdom, and Sirach (or Ecclesiasticus).

In the De doctrina christiana, Augustine explains the relation between the two books of Ezra/Esdras and its separation with the Chronicles (partly included in the Septuagint's 1 Esdras): "... and the two of Ezra, which last look more like a sequel to the continuous regular history which terminates with the books of Kings and Chronicles."
