= Deuterocanonical books =

Books of the Bible which are considered non-canonical by Protestant denominations

The deuterocanonical books, (Note: From Medieval Latin: deutero-canonicus, of 'deutero' (Ancient Greek: δεύτερος, lit. 'second') + 'canonical' (Medieval Latin: canonicalis, lit. 'pertaining to Biblical canon', from Ancient Greek: κανών, romanized: kanṓn, lit. 'rod, pole, bar')) meaning 'of, pertaining to, or constituting a second canon', collectively known as the Deuterocanon (DC), are certain books and passages considered to be canonical books of the Old Testament by the Catholic Church, the Eastern Orthodox Church, the Oriental Orthodox Churches, and the Church of the East. In contrast, modern Rabbinic Judaism and Protestantism regard the DC as Apocrypha.

Seven books are accepted as deuterocanonical by all the ancient churches: Tobit, Judith, Baruch with the Letter of Jeremiah, Sirach or Ecclesiasticus, Wisdom, First and Second Maccabees and also the Greek additions to Esther and Daniel. (Note: "The protocanonical books of the Old Testament correspond with those of the Bible of the Hebrews, and the Old Testament as received by Protestants. The deuterocanonical (deuteros, "second") are those whose Scriptural character was contested in some quarters, but which long ago gained a secure footing in the Bible of the Catholic Church, though those of the Old Testament are classed by Protestants as the "Apocrypha". These consist of seven books: Tobias, Judith, Baruch, Ecclesiasticus, Wisdom, First and Second Maccabees; also certain additions to Esther and Daniel.") In addition to these, the Eastern Orthodox Church and the Oriental Orthodox Churches include other books in their canons.

The deuterocanonical books are included in the Septuagint, the earliest extant Greek translation of the Hebrew Bible. They date from 300 BC to 100 AD, before the separation of the Christian church from Judaism, and they are regularly found in old manuscripts and cited frequently by the Church Fathers, such as Clement of Rome, Clement of Alexandria, Origen, Irenaeus, and Tertullian.

According to the Gelasian Decree, the Council of Rome (382 AD) defined a list of books of scripture as canonical. It included most of the deuterocanonical books. Patristic and synodal lists from the 200s, 300s and 400s usually include selections of the deuterocanonical books.

== List of deuterocanonicals ==
Canonical for the Catholic Church, the Eastern Orthodox Church, the Oriental Orthodox Churches, and the Church of the East:

- Tobit
- Judith
- Baruch including the Letter of Jeremiah (Baruch chapter 6)
- Sirach (or Ecclesiasticus)
- 1 Maccabees
- 2 Maccabees
- Wisdom
- Greek additions to Esther (Note: Mordecai's Dream (Addition A; Vulgate Esther 11); Haman's Decree (Addition B; Vulgate Esther 13); Prayers of Mordecai and Esther (Addition C; Vulgate Esther 13–14); Esther Before the King (Addition D; Vulgate Esther 15); Artaxerxes' Decree (Addition E; Vulgate Esther 16); Interpretation of the Dream (Addition F; Vulgate Esther 10))
- Greek additions to Daniel (Note: Prayer of Azariah and Song of the Three Holy Children (Greek Daniel 3:24–90; Vulgate Daniel 3); Susanna and the Elders (Greek Daniel prologue; Vulgate Daniel 13); Bel and the Dragon (Greek Daniel epilogue; Vulgate Daniel 14))

Canonical only for the Eastern Orthodox Church and the Oriental Orthodox Churches:

- Prayer of Manasseh
- 1 Esdras
- 2 Esdras
- 3 Maccabees
- 4 Maccabees as an appendix
- Psalm 151

=== Dates of composition ===
Deuterocanonical books composition
Book	Dating	Original language (and location)
Letter of Jeremiah	c. 300 BC	Oldest versions Greek, probably originally Hebrew or Aramaic
Psalm 151	c. 300–200 BC	Hebrew (Psalms 151a+b), later merged into Koine Greek Psalm 151
1 Esdras	c. 200–140 BC	Probably Greek in Egypt, possibly from a 3rd-century Semitic original
Sirach	c. 180–175 BC	Hebrew in Jerusalem
Tobit	c. 225–175 or 175–164 BC	Probably Aramaic, possibly Hebrew, possibly in Antioch
Wisdom of Solomon	c. 150 BC	Most probably Koine Greek in Alexandria
Judith	c. 150–100 BC	Oldest versions Greek, originally probably Hebrew, possibly Greek
2 Maccabees	c. 150–120 BC	Koine Greek
1 Maccabees	c. 135–103 BC	Oldest versions Greek, original probably Hebrew, probably in Jerusalem
Additions to Daniel	c. 100 BC	Oldest versions Greek, originally Semitic or Greek
Prayer of Manasseh	c. 200 BC – AD 50	Oldest versions Greek, originally probably Greek, possibly Semitic
Baruch	c. 200–100 BC (1:1–3:38) c. 100 BC – AD 100 (3:39–5:9)	(1:1–3:38) Koine Greek, probably originally Hebrew (3:39–5:9) Koine Greek, possibly originally Hebrew or Aramaic
3 Maccabees	c. 100–50 BC	Koine Greek, probably in Alexandria
Additions to Esther	c. 100–1 BC	Koine Greek in Alexandria
4 Maccabees	c. AD 18–55	Koine Greek, probably outside Israel
2 Esdras	c. AD 90–100 (4 Ezra) c. AD 100–300 (5 Ezra) c. AD 200–300 (6 Ezra)	4 Ezra (2 Esdras 3–14): probably Hebrew by a Jew; 5 Ezra (2 Esdras 1–2): probably Latin by a Christian; 6 Ezra (2 Esdras 15–16): probably Greek by a Levantine Christian
Odes	c. AD 400–440	Codex Alexandrinus is the oldest version. Medieval Greek, prior history unknown

== Historical background ==
Deuterocanonical is a term coined in 1566 by the theologian Sixtus of Siena, who had converted to Catholicism from Judaism, to describe scriptural texts considered canonical by the Catholic Church, but which recognition was considered "secondary". For Sixtus, this term included portions of both Old and New Testaments. He also applies the term to the Book of Esther from the canon of the Hebrew Bible.

The term was then taken up by other writers to apply specifically to those books of the Old Testament which had been recognised as canonical by the Councils of Rome (382 AD), Hippo (393 AD), Carthage (397 AD and 419 AD), Florence (1442 AD) and Trent (1546 AD), but which were not in the Hebrew canon. (Note: Commonly cited include: (1) Melito of Sardis, who went east, to Palestine, and recorded the canon he found being used in the synagogues, as recorded in Eusebius' Church History, 4.26.13–14; (2) Athanasius of Alexandria; (3) Council of Laodicea; (4) Jerome residing in Bethlehem.)

Forms of the term "deuterocanonical" were adopted after the 16th century by the Eastern Orthodox Church to denote canonical books of the Septuagint not in the Hebrew Bible, a wider selection than that adopted by the Council of Trent, and also by the Ethiopian Orthodox Tewahedo Church to apply to works believed to be of Jewish origin translated in the Old Testament of the Ethiopic Bible, a wider selection still.

The acceptance of some of these books among early Christians was widespread, though not universal, and surviving Bibles from the early Church always include, with varying degrees of recognition, books now called deuterocanonical. Some say that their canonicity seems not to have been doubted in the Church until it was challenged by Jews after 100 AD, sometimes postulating a hypothetical Council of Jamnia. Regional councils in the West published official canons that included these books as early as the 4th and 5th centuries. (Note: e.g., the Council of Carthage (397), the Council of Rome, the Gelasian decree)

The Catholic Encyclopedia states:

The official attitude of the Latin Church, always favourable to them, kept the majestic tenor of its way. Two documents of capital importance in the history of the canon constitute the first formal utterance of papal authority on the subject. The first is the so-called "Decretal of Gelasius", the essential part of which is now generally attributed to a synod convoked by Pope Damasus in the year 382. The other is the Canon of Innocent I, sent in 405 to a Gallican bishop in answer to an inquiry. Both contain all the deuterocanonicals, without any distinction, and are identical with the catalogue of Trent. The African Church, always a staunch supporter of the contested books, found itself in entire accord with Rome on this question. Its ancient version, the Vetus Latina, had admitted all the Old Testament Scriptures. St. Augustine seems to theoretically recognize degrees of inspiration; in practice he employs protos and deuteros without any discrimination whatsoever. Moreover in his "De Doctrinâ Christianâ" he enumerates the components of the complete Old Testament. The Synod of Hippo (393) and the three of Carthage (393, 397, and 419), in which, doubtless, Augustine was the leading spirit, found it necessary to deal explicitly with the question of the Canon, and drew up identical lists from which no sacred books are excluded. These councils base their canon on tradition and liturgical usage.

=== Dead Sea scrolls ===
The Book of Sirach, whose Hebrew text was already known from the Cairo Geniza, has been found in two of the Dead Sea Scrolls (2QSir or 2Q18, 11QPs_a or 11Q5) in Hebrew. Another Hebrew scroll of Sirach has been found in Masada (MasSir). Five fragments from the Book of Tobit have been found in Qumran written in Aramaic and in one written in Hebrew (papyri 4Q, nos. 196–200). (Note: See in "The Dead Sea Scrolls – Browse Manuscripts – Apocrypha". The Dead Sea Scrolls – Browse Manuscripts.) The Letter of Jeremiah (or Baruch chapter 6) has been found in cave 7 (papyrus 7Q2) in Greek.

Recent scholars have suggested that the Qumran library of approximately 1,100 manuscripts found in the eleven caves at Qumran was not entirely produced at Qumran, but may have included part of the library of the Jerusalem Temple, that may have been hidden in the caves for safekeeping at the time the Temple was destroyed by Romans in 70 AD.

=== Influence of the Septuagint ===
Deuterocanonical and Apocryphal books included in the Septuagint are:

Greek name	Transliteration	English name
Deuterocanonical for the Catholic Church and the Eastern Orthodox Church
Τωβίτ (Note: Also called Τωβείτ or Τωβίθ in some sources.)	Tōbit (Note: Also called Tōbeit or Tōbith)	Tobit or Tobias
Ἰουδίθ	Ioudith	Judith
Ἐσθήρ	Esthēr	Esther with additions
Μακκαβαίων Αʹ	1 Makkabaiōn	1 Maccabees
Μακκαβαίων Βʹ	2 Makkabaiōn	2 Maccabees
Σοφία Σαλoμῶντος	Sophia Salomōntos	Wisdom or Wisdom of Solomon
Σοφία Ἰησοῦ Σειράχ	Sophia Iēsou Seirach	Sirach or Ecclesiasticus
Βαρούχ	Barouch	Baruch
Ἐπιστολὴ Ἰερεμίου	Epistolē Ieremiou	Epistle of Jeremiah
Δανιήλ	Daniēl	Daniel with additions
Deuterocanonical for the Eastern Orthodox Church (Note: The canon of the original Old Greek LXX is disputed. Eastern Orthodox Church considers some of the following books as deuterocanonical.)
Προσευχὴ Μανασσῆ	Proseuchē Manassē	Prayer of Manasseh
Ἔσδρας Αʹ	1 Esdras	1 Esdras
Μακκαβαίων Γʹ	3 Makkabaiōn	3 Maccabees
Μακκαβαίων Δ' Παράρτημα	4 Makkabaiōn	4 Maccabees
Ψαλμός ΡΝΑʹ	Psalmos 151	Psalm 151
Apocrypha
Ψαλμοί Σαλoμῶντος	Psalmoi Salomōntos	Psalms of Solomon

The large majority of Old Testament references in the New Testament are taken from the Koine Greek Septuagint (LXX), editions of which include the deuterocanonical books, as well as apocrypha – both of which are called collectively anagignoskomena ("readable, worthy of reading"). No two Septuagint codices contain the same apocrypha.

Greek Psalm manuscripts from the fifth century contain three New Testament "psalms": the Magnificat, the Benedictus, the Nunc dimittis from Luke's birth narrative, and the conclusion of the hymn that begins with the "Gloria in Excelsis". Beckwith states that manuscripts of anything like the capacity of Codex Alexandrinus were not used in the first centuries of the Christian era, and believes that the comprehensive codices of the Septuagint, which start appearing in the 4th century AD, are all of Christian origin.

In the New Testament, Hebrews 11:35 is understood by some as referring to an event that was recorded in one of the deuterocanonical books, 2 Maccabees. For instance, the author of Hebrews references a tradition which spoke of an Old Testament prophet who was sawn in half in Hebrews 11:37, two verses after the 2nd Maccabees reference. Other New Testament authors such as Paul also reference or quote period literature.

=== Influence of early authors ===
The Jewish historian Josephus (c. 94 AD) wrote that the Hebrew Bible contained 22 canonical books. The same number of 22 books was reported also by the Christian bishop Athanasius, but they might differ on the exact content (see below for Athanasius), as Josephus did not provide a detailed list.

Origen of Alexandria (c. 240 AD), cited by Eusebius, described the Hebrew Bible as containing 22 canonical books. Among these books he listed the Epistle of Jeremiah and the Maccabees.

The twenty-two books of the Hebrews are the following: That which is called by us Genesis; Exodus; Leviticus; Numbers; Jesus, the son of Nave (Joshua book); Judges and Ruth in one book; the First and Second of Kings (1 Samuel and 2 Samuel) in one; the Third and Fourth of Kings (1 Kings and 2 Kings) in one; of the Chronicles, the First and Second in one; Esdras, First and Second (Ezra–Nehemiah) in one; the book of Psalms; the Proverbs of Solomon; Ecclesiastes; the Song of Songs; Isaiah; Jeremiah, with Lamentations and the epistle (of Jeremiah) in one; Daniel; Ezekiel; Job; Esther. And besides these there are the Maccabees.

Eusebius wrote in his Church History (c. 324 AD) that Bishop Melito of Sardis in the 2nd century AD considered the deuterocanonical Wisdom of Solomon as part of the Old Testament and that it was considered canonical by Jews and Christians. On the other hand, the contrary claim has been made: "In the catalogue of Melito, presented by Eusebius, after Proverbs, the word Wisdom occurs, which nearly all commentators have been of opinion is only another name for the same book, and not the name of the book now called 'The Wisdom of Solomon'."

Cyril of Jerusalem (c. 350 AD) in his Catechetical Lectures cites as canonical books "Jeremiah one, including Baruch and Lamentations and the Epistle (of Jeremiah)".

In Athanasius's canonical books list (367 AD) the Book of Baruch and the Letter of Jeremiah are included while Esther is omitted. At the same time, he mentioned that the Wisdom of Solomon, the Wisdom of Sirach, Judith and Tobit, the book of Esther and also the Didache and The Shepherd of Hermas, while not being part of the Canon, "were appointed by the Fathers to be read". He excluded what he called "apocryphal writings" entirely.

Epiphanius of Salamis (c. 385 AD) mentions that "there are 27 books given the Jews by God, but they are counted as 22, however, like the letters of their Hebrew alphabet, because ten books are doubled and reckoned as five". He wrote in his Panarion that Jews had in their books the deuterocanonical Epistle of Jeremiah and Baruch, both combined with Jeremiah and Lamentations in only one book. While Wisdom of Sirach and the Wisdom of Solomon were books of disputed canonicity.

Augustine of Hippo (c. 397 AD), in his book On Christian Doctrine (Book II Chapter 8), cites a list of the canon of the Old Testament and the New Testament, including the deuterocanonical books as canonical:

Now the whole canon of Scripture on which we say this judgment is to be exercised, is contained in the following books: – Five books of Moses, that is, Genesis, Exodus, Leviticus, Numbers, Deuteronomy; one book of Joshua the son of Nun; one of Judges; one short book called Ruth; next, four books of Kings [the two Books of Samuel and the two books of Kings], and two of Chronicles, Job, and Tobias, and Esther, and Judith, and the two books of Maccabees, and the two of Ezra [Ezra, Nehemiah]; one book of the Psalms of David; and three books of Solomon, that is to say Proverbs, Song of Songs, and Ecclesiastes. For two books, one called Wisdom and the other Ecclesiasticus. Twelve separate books of the prophets which are connected with one another, and having never been disjoined, are reckoned as one book; the names of these prophets are as follows: Hosea, Joel, Amos, Obadiah, Jonah, Micah, Nahum, Habakkuk, Zephaniah, Haggai, Zechariah, Malachi; then there are the four greater prophets, Isaiah, Jeremiah, Daniel, Ezekiel.

According to the monk Rufinus of Aquileia (c. 400 AD) the deuterocanonical books were not called canonical but ecclesiastical books. In this category Rufinus includes the Wisdom of Solomon, Sirach, Judith, Tobit and two books of Maccabees. Baruch is not specified by name in Rufinus's list, but it is in Cyril's, as though a part of Jeremiah, "Jeremiah, with Baruch, and the Lamentations and the Epistle." (Catech. 4, §36.)

Pope Innocent I (405 AD) sent a letter to the bishop of Toulouse citing deuterocanonical books as a part of the Old Testament canon.

Which books really are received in the canon, this brief addition shows. These therefore are the things of which you desired to be informed. Five books of Moses, that is, Genesis, Exodus, Leviticus, Numbers, and Deuteronomy, and Joshua the son of Nun, and Judges, and the four books of Kings [the two Books of Samuel and the two books of Kings] together with Ruth, sixteen books of the Prophets, five books of Solomon [Proverbs, Ecclesiastes, Song of Songs, Wisdom of Solomon, and Ecclesiasticus], and the Psalms. Also of the historical books, one book of Job, one of Tobit, one of Esther, one of Judith, two of Maccabees, two of Ezra [Ezra, Nehemiah], two of Chronicles.

In the 7th century Latin document the Muratorian fragment, which some scholars actually believe to be a copy of an earlier 170 AD Greek original, the book of the Wisdom of Solomon is counted by the church.

Moreover, the epistle of Jude and two of the above-mentioned (or, bearing the name of) John are counted (or, used) in the catholic [Church]; and [the book of] Wisdom, written by the friends of Solomon in his honour.

=== Synods ===
In later copyings of the canons of the Council of Laodicea (from 364 AD) a canon list became appended to Canon 59, likely before the mid fifth century, which affirmed that Jeremiah, and Baruch, the Lamentations, and the Epistle (of Jeremiah) were canonical, while excluding the other deuterocanonical books.

According to Decretum Gelasianum, which is a work written by an anonymous scholar between 519 and 553, the Council of Rome (382 AD) cites a list of books of scripture presented as having been made canonical. This list mentions all the deuterocanonical books as a part of the Old Testament canon:

Genesis, Exodus, Leviticus, Numbers, Deuteronomy, Joshua, Judges, Ruth, Kings IV books [1 Samuel, 2 Samuel, 1 Kings, 2 Kings], Chronicles II books, 150 Psalms, three books of Solomon [Proverbs, Ecclesiastes, Song of Songs], Wisdom, Ecclesiasticus, Isaiah, Jeremiah with Cinoth i.e. his lamentations, Ezechiel, Daniel, Hosea, Amos, Micah, Joel, Obadiah, Jonah, Nahum, Habbakuk, Zephaniah, Haggai, Zechariah, Malachi, Job, Tobit, Esdras II books [Ezra, Nehemiah], Ester, Judith, Maccabees II books.

(According to the Council of Laodicea, Athanasius, Cyril of Jerusalem, and Epiphanius of Salamis, the Book of Jeremiah forms a single book together with Baruch, Lamentations and the Letter of Jeremiah, also called the Epistle of Jeremiah.)

The Synod of Hippo (in 393 AD), followed by the Council of Carthage (397) and the Council of Carthage (419), may be the first councils that explicitly accepted the first canon which includes a selection of books that did not appear in the Hebrew Bible; the councils were under significant influence of Augustine of Hippo, who regarded the canon as already closed.

Canon XXIV from the Synod of Hippo (in 393 AD) records the scriptures which are considered canonical; the Old Testament books as follows:

Genesis; Exodus; Leviticus; Numbers; Deuteronomy; Joshua the Son of Nun; The Judges; Ruth; The Kings, iv. books [1 Samuel, 2 Samuel, 1 Kings, 2 Kings]; The Chronicles, ii. books; Job; The Psalter; The Five books of Solomon [Proverbs, Ecclesiastes, Song of Songs, Wisdom of Solomon, and Ecclesiasticus]; The Twelve Books of the Prophets [Hosea, Joel, Amos, Obadiah, Jonah, Micah, Nahum, Habakkuk, Zephaniah, Haggai, Zechariah, Malachi]; Isaiah; Jeremiah; Ezechiel; Daniel; Tobit; Judith; Esther; Ezra, ii. books [Ezra, Nehemiah]; Maccabees, ii. books.

On 28 August 397, the Council of Carthage confirmed the canon issued at Hippo; the recurrence of the Old Testament part is stated:

Genesis, Exodus, Leviticus, Numbers, Deuteronomy, Joshua the son of Nun, Judges, Ruth, four books of Kings [1 Samuel, 2 Samuel, 1 Kings, 2 Kings], two books of Paraleipomena [1 Chronicles, 2 Chronicles], Job, the Psalter, five books of Solomon [ Proverbs, Ecclesiastes, Song of Songs, Wisdom of Solomon, and Ecclesiasticus ], the books of the twelve prophets, Isaiah, Jeremiah, Ezechiel, Daniel, Tobit, Judith, Esther, two books of Esdras [Ezra, Nehemiah], two Books of the Maccabees.

In 419 AD, the Council of Carthage in its canon 24 lists the deuterocanonical books as canonical scripture:

The Canonical Scriptures are as follows: Genesis, Exodus, Leviticus, Numbers, Deuteronomy, Joshua the son of Nun, Judges, Ruth, four books of Kings [1 Samuel, 2 Samuel, 1 Kings, 2 Kings], two books of Chronicles, Job, the Psalter, five books of Solomon [Proverbs, Ecclesiastes, Song of Songs, Wisdom of Solomon, and Ecclesiasticus], the books of the twelve prophets, Isaiah, Jeremiah, Ezechiel, Daniel, Tobit, Judith, Esther, two books of Esdras [Ezra, Nehemiah], two Books of the Maccabees.

(According to the Council of Laodicea, Athanasius, Cyril of Jerusalem, and Epiphanius of Salamis, the Book of Jeremiah forms a single book together with Baruch, Lamentations and the Letter of Jeremiah, also called the Epistle of Jeremiah.)

The Apostolic Canons approved by the Eastern Council in Trullo in 692 AD (not recognized by the Catholic Church) states as venerable and sacred the first three books of Maccabees and Wisdom of Sirach.

The Council of Florence (1442) promulgated a list of the books of the Bible, including the books of Judith, Esther, Wisdom, Ecclesiasticus, Baruch and two books of the Maccabees as Canonical books:

Five books of Moses, namely Genesis, Exodus, Leviticus, Numbers, Deuteronomy; Joshua, Judges, Ruth, four books of Kings [1 Samuel, 2 Samuel, 1 Kings, 2 Kings], two of Paralipomenon [1 Chronicles, 2 Chronicles], Esdras [Ezra], Nehemiah, Tobit, Judith, Esther, Job, Psalms of David, Proverbs, Ecclesiastes, Song of Songs, Wisdom, Ecclesiasticus, Isaiah, Jeremiah, Baruch, Ezechiel, Daniel; the twelve minor prophets, namely Hosea, Joel, Amos, Obadiah, Jonah, Micah, Nahum, Habakkuk, Zephaniah, Haggai, Zechariah, Malachi; two books of the Maccabees.

The Council of Trent (1546) adopted an understanding of the canons of these previous councils as corresponding to its own list of deuterocanonical books:

Of the Old Testament, the five books of Moses, namely, Genesis, Exodus, Leviticus, Numbers, Deuteronomy; Josue, Judges, Ruth, the four books of Kings [1 Samuel, 2 Samuel, 1 Kings, 2 Kings], two of Paralipomenon [1 Chronicles, 2 Chronicles], the first and second of Esdras [Ezra, Nehemiah], Tobias, Judith, Esther, Job, the Davidic Psalter of 150 Psalms, Proverbs, Ecclesiastes, the Canticle of Canticles [Song of Songs], Wisdom, Ecclesiasticus, Isaias, Jeremias, with Baruch, Ezechiel, Daniel, the twelve minor Prophets, namely, Osee, Joel, Amos, Abdias, Jonas, Micheas, Nahum, Habacuc, Sophonias, Aggeus, Zacharias, Malachias; two books of Machabees, the first and second.

=== Influence of Jerome ===
Jerome in one of his Vulgate prologues describes a canon which excludes the deuterocanonical books. In these prologues, Jerome mentions all of the deuterocanonical and apocryphal works by name as being apocryphal or "not in the canon" except for Prayer of Manasses and Baruch. He mentions Baruch by name in his Prologue to Jeremiah and notes that it is neither read nor held among the Hebrews, but does not explicitly call it apocryphal or "not in the canon". The inferior status to which the deuterocanonical books were relegated by authorities like Jerome is seen by some as being due to a rigid conception of canonicity, one demanding that a book, to be entitled to this supreme dignity, must be received by all, must have the sanction of Jewish antiquity, and must moreover be adapted not only to edification, but also to the "confirmation of the doctrine of the Church".

Theologian J. N. D. Kelly states that "Jerome, conscious of the difficulty of arguing with Jews on the basis of books they spurned and anyhow regarding the Hebrew original as authoritative, was adamant that anything not found in it was 'to be classed among the apocrypha', not in the canon; later he grudgingly conceded that the Church read some of these books for edification, but not to support doctrine."

Jerome's original Vulgate included Tobias and Judith, which he translated in one day only by request of other Christians. Jerome referenced and quoted from some as scripture despite describing them as "not in the canon". Michael Barber asserts that, although Jerome was once suspicious of the apocrypha, he later viewed them as scripture. Barber argues that this is clear from Jerome's epistles; he cites Jerome's letter to Eustochium, in which Jerome quotes Sirach 13:2. Elsewhere Jerome apparently also refers to Baruch, the Story of Susannah and Wisdom as scripture. Henry Barker states that Jerome quotes the Apocrypha with marked respect, and even as "Scripture", giving them an ecclesiastical if not a canonical position and use. Luther also wrote introductions to the books of the Apocrypha, and occasionally quoted from some to support an argument.

In his prologue to Judith, without using the word canon, Jerome mentioned that Judith was held to be scriptural by the First Council of Nicaea.

Among the Hebrews the Book of Judith is found among the Hagiographa. ...But because this book is found by the Nicene Council to have been counted among the number of the Sacred Scriptures, I have acquiesced to your request.

In his reply to Rufinus, Jerome affirmed that he was consistent with the choice of the church regarding which version of the deuterocanonical portions of Daniel to use, which the Jews of his day did not include:

What sin have I committed in following the judgment of the churches? But when I repeat what the Jews say against the Story of Susanna and the Hymn of the Three Children, and the fables of Bel and the Dragon, which are not contained in the Hebrew Bible, the man who makes this a charge against me proves himself to be a fool and a slanderer; for I explained not what I thought but what they commonly say against us. (Against Rufinus, II:33 [402 AD])

Thus Jerome acknowledged the principle by which the canon would be settled—the judgment of the Church (at least the local churches in this case) rather than his own judgment or the judgment of Jews; though concerning translation of Daniel to Greek, he wondered why one should use the version of a translator whom he regarded as a heretic and judaizer (Theodotion).

The Vulgate is also important as the touchstone of the canon concerning which parts of books are canonical. When the Council of Trent confirmed the books included in the first canon, it qualified the books as being "entire with all their parts, as they have been used to be read in the Catholic Church, and as they are contained in the old Latin vulgate edition". This decree was clarified somewhat by Pope Pius XI on 2 June 1927, who allowed that the Comma Johanneum was open to dispute.

The Council of Trent also ratified the Vulgate Bible as the official Latin version of the Bible for the Roman Catholic Church.

Deuterocanonical and Apocryphal books included in the Latin Vulgate are:

Latin name	English name
Deuterocanonical Books
Tobiae	Tobit or Tobias
Judith	Judith
Esther	Esther with additions
Machabaeorum I	1 Maccabees
Machabaeorum II	2 Maccabees
Sapientia	Wisdom or Wisdom of Solomon
Ecclesiasticus	Sirach or Ecclesiasticus
Baruch	Baruch included the Epistle of Jeremiah
Daniel	Daniel with additions
Apocryphal Books
3 Esdrae	1 Esdras
4 Esdrae	2 Esdras
Psalmi 151	Psalm 151
Oratio Manasse	Prayer of Manasseh
Epistula Ad Laodicenses	Epistle to the Laodiceans

=== Masoretic Text ===
The existence of the Septuagint, Samaritan Pentateuch, and the Peshitta versions of the Hebrew scriptures demonstrate that different versions of Judaism used different texts, and it is debated which is closest to the Urtext (a theoretical "original" text from which all of these emerged). The Dead Sea Scrolls contain some of the deuterocanonical books, while the Masoretic Text excludes them. Since the Enlightenment, it was wrongly believed that the Masoretic Text was the "original" Hebrew Bible when this was in fact a medieval version created by the Masoretes. The oldest nearly-complete manuscripts of the Old Testament include the Codex Vaticanus (4th century) and the Codex Alexandrinus (5th century), while the oldest complete manuscript of the Masoretic text is the Codex Leningradensis from 1008.

The Septuagint was the version of the Hebrew Bible from which the early Christians emerged. The Christian Bible contained these deuterocanonical books until Martin Luther, assuming the Masoretic text to be the original, removed them to match this new Jewish canon. Rabbinic Judaism is a newer form of Judaism that created the Masoretic text in part to deter a Christian reading of the Old Testament.

== In Judaism ==
Although there is no scholarly consensus as to when the Hebrew Bible canon was fixed, some scholars hold that the Hebrew canon was established well before the 1st century AD – even as early as the 4th century BC, or by the Hasmonean dynasty (140–40 BC).

The canon of modern Rabbinic Judaism excludes the deuterocanonical books. Albert J. Sundberg writes that Judaism did not exclude from their scriptures the deuterocanonicals and the additional Greek texts listed here.

The Septuagint translation of the Hebrew Bible into Greek, which the early Christian church used as its Old Testament, included all of the deuterocanonical books. The term distinguished these books from both the protocanonical books (the books of the Hebrew canon) and the biblical apocrypha (books of Jewish origin that were sometimes read in Christian churches as scripture but which were not regarded as canonical).

Some commentators see texts from these particular books being paraphrased, referred, or alluded to many times in the New Testament, depending in large measure on what is counted as a reference; other scholars point to a correspondence of thought.

== In the Catholic Church ==
In the Council of Rome in 382 AD, under the Papacy of Damasus I, the deuterocanonical books were listed with the rest of Scripture. Those books were later included in the Latin Vulgate, that originally did not have them, and which has been considered over many centuries as one of the official Bible translations of the Catholic Church.

The Synod of Hippo (in 393 AD), followed by the Council of Carthage (397) and the Council of Carthage (419), also explicitly accepted the first canon from the Council of Rome. These councils were under significant influence of Augustine of Hippo, who also regarded the Biblical canon as already closed. The Council of Florence (1442) taught the inspiration of all the Scriptures, but did not formally pass on their canonicity.

The Council of Trent in 1546 stated the list of books included in the canon as it had been set out in the Council of Florence. In respect to the deuterocanonical books this list conformed with the canon lists of Western synods of the late 4th century, other than including Baruch with the Letter of Jeremiah (Baruch chapter 6) as a single book. In response to Martin Luther's demands, the Council of Trent on 8 April 1546 approved the present Catholic Bible canon, which includes the deuterocanonical books, and the decision was confirmed by an anathema by vote (24 yea, 15 nay, 16 abstain). One of those who rejected the deuterocanonical books in the council of Trent was the famous Cardinal Seripando. Among the Catholic scholars who rejected them at the time of the reformation are Cardinal Cajetan, Cardinal Ximénes in his Complutensian Polyglot Bible, St. Antoninus of Florence and Lefèvre d'Étaples. St. Thomas More accepted them as Scripture, accounted as such by the Church. Erasmus says, only the Spirit of the church knew whether or not the church has accepted these books as of equal authority with the others. According to the New Catholic Encyclopedia, the Council of Trent definitively settled the matter of the Old Testament Canon.

Protestant theologian Philip Schaff states that "the Council of Hippo in 393, and the third (according to another reckoning, the sixth) Council of Carthage in 397, under the influence of Augustine, who attended both, fixed the catholic canon of the Holy Scriptures, including the Apocrypha of the Old Testament. This decision of the transmarine church, however, was subject to ratification; the concurrence of the Roman See it received when Innocent I and Gelasius I (AD 414) repeated the same index of biblical books."

Schaff says that this canon remained undisturbed till the 16th century, and was sanctioned by the Council of Trent at its fourth session, although as the Catholic Encyclopedia reports, "in the Latin Church, all through the Middle Ages we find evidence of hesitation about the character of the deuterocanonicals. ... Few are found to unequivocally acknowledge their canonicity," but that "the countless manuscript copies of the Vulgate produced by these ages, with a slight, probably accidental, exception, uniformly embrace the complete Old Testament."

Subsequent research qualifies this latter statement, in that a distinct tradition of large format pandect bibles has been identified as having been promoted by the 11th and 12th century reforming Papacy for presentation to monasteries in Italy – now commonly termed 'Atlantic Bibles' on account of their very great size. While not all these Bibles present a consistent reformed Vulgate text, they generally exclude the deuterocanonical books.

The Paris Bible was a new fairly standard format for portable personal Bibles developed by preaching friars in the 13th century: these included the deuterocanonical books but not the previously common apocryphal Epistle to the Laodiceans or the Fourth Book of Esdras.

=== Baruch and the Letter of Jeremiah ===
According to the canon lists of the Council of Laodicea, Athanasius (367 AD), Cyril of Jerusalem (c. 350 AD), and Epiphanius of Salamis (c. 385 AD), the Book of Jeremiah forms a single book together with Baruch, Lamentations and the Letter of Jeremiah (also called Epistle of Jeremiah).

In the Old Latin version of the Bible, Baruch and the Letter of Jeremiah appear to have been incorporated into the Book of Jeremiah, and Latin Fathers of the 4th century and earlier always cite their texts as being from that book. However, when Jerome translated Jeremiah afresh from the Hebrew text, which is considerably longer than the Greek Septuagint text and with chapters in a different order, he steadfastly refused to incorporate either Baruch or the Letter of Jeremiah from the Greek.

In the 9th century these two works were reintroduced into the Vulgate Bibles produced under the influence of Theodulf of Orleans, originally as additional chapters to the Vulgate book of Jeremiah. Subsequently, and especially in the Paris Bibles of the 13th century, they are found together as a single, combined book after Lamentations.

=== Esdras ===
For the Roman Catholic Church and Protestant churches, Greek Esdras is now considered apocryphal. The Orthodox Church considers it as canonical. The earlier canonical status of this book in the Western church can be less easy to track, as references to Esdras in canon lists and citations may refer either to this book, or to Greek Ezra–Nehemiah, or both together. In the surviving Greek pandect Bibles of the 4th and 5th centuries, Greek Esdras always stands as 'Esdras A' while the Greek translation of the whole of canonical Ezra–Nehemiah stands as 'Esdras B'. The same is found in the surviving witness of the Old Latin Bible.

When Latin fathers of the early church cite quotations from the biblical 'Book of Ezra' it is overwhelmingly 'First Ezra/Esdras A' to which they refer, as in Augustine 'City of God' 18:36. Citations of the 'Nehemiah' sections of Old Latin Second Ezra/'Esdras B' are much rarer. No Old Latin citations from the 'Ezra' sections of Second Ezra/'Esdras B' are known before Bede in the 8th century. Consequently Gallagher and Meade conclude that "when the ancient canon lists, whether Greek or Latin, mention two books of Esdras, they must have in mind the books known in the LXX and Old Latin as Esdras A and Esdras B; i.e. our 1 Esdras and Ezra-Nehemiah."

In his prologue to Ezra Jerome refers to four books of Ezra in the Latin tradition. Jerome's first and second Latin books of Ezra are those of the Old Latin Bible - corresponding to Greek Esdras and Ezra-Nehemiah in the Septuagint. These two books he considers each to be a corrupt version of the single Hebrew book of Ezra, so he claims that his Vulgate version of Ezra from the Hebrew replaces both of them. Jerome condemns the third and fourth Latin books of Ezra as apocrypha. His third book must correspond to the Jewish Apocalypse of Ezra while the fourth book is likely to comprise other material from Latin Ezra.

From the 9th century, occasional Latin Vulgate manuscripts are found in which Jerome's single Ezra text is split to form the separate books of Ezra and Nehemiah. In the Paris Bibles of the 13th century this split has become universal, with Esdras A being reintroduced as '3 Esdras' and Latin Esdras being added as '4 Esdras'. At the Council of Trent neither '3 Esdras' nor '4 Esdras' were accepted as canonical books, but were eventually printed in the section of 'Apocrypha' in the Sixto-Clementine Vulgate, along with the Prayer of Manasses.

== In Eastern Orthodoxy ==
The Eastern Orthodox Church has traditionally included all the books of the Septuagint in their Old Testaments. The Greeks use the word Anagignoskomena (Ἀναγιγνωσκόμενα, "readable, worthy to be read") to describe the books of the Greek Septuagint that are not present in the Hebrew Bible. When Eastern Orthodox theologians use the term "deuterocanonical", the meaning is not identical to the Roman Catholic usage. In Eastern Orthodox Christianity, deuterocanonical means that a book is part of the corpus of the Old Testament (i.e. is read during the services) but has secondary authority. In other words, deutero (second) applies to authority or witnessing power, whereas in Roman Catholicism, deutero applies to chronology (the fact that these books were confirmed later), not to authority.

The Eastern Orthodox Church canon includes the deuterocanonical books accepted by the Catholic Church plus 1 Esdras, 3 Maccabees, Psalm 151, and the Prayer of Manasseh, while Baruch and the Letter of Jeremiah are separated.

The Eastern Orthodox synod, the Synod of Jerusalem, held in 1672 receive as its canon the books found in the Septuagint, and in the Patristic, Byzantine, and liturgical tradition. The Synod declared the Eastern Orthodox canon as follows:

we call Sacred Scripture all those which Cyril [Lucaris] collected from the Synod of Laodicea, and enumerated, adding to Scripture those which he foolishly and ignorantly, or rather maliciously, called Apocrypha; specifically, "The Wisdom of Solomon," "Judith," "Tobit," "The History of the Dragon" [Bel and the Dragon], "The History of Susanna," "The Maccabees," and "The Wisdom of Sirach." For we judge these also to be with the other genuine Books of Divine Scripture genuine parts of Scripture. For ancient custom, or rather the Catholic Church, which has delivered to us as genuine the Sacred Gospels and the other Books of Scripture, has undoubtedly delivered these also as parts of Scripture, and the denial of these is the rejection of those. And if, perhaps, it seems that not always have all of these been considered on the same level as the others, yet nevertheless these also have been counted and reckoned with the rest of Scripture, both by Synods and by many of the most ancient and eminent Theologians of the Universal Church. All of these we also judge to be Canonical Books, and confess them to be Sacred Scripture.

Other texts printed in Eastern Orthodox Bibles are included as an appendix, which is not the same in all churches; the appendix contains 4 Maccabees in Greek-language bibles, while it contains 2 Esdras in Slavonic-language and Russian-language.

In the Russian Church, St. Philaret of Moscow omitted the decree of the Synod of Jerusalem concerning the deuterocanonical books in his translation. In his Longer Catechism, he reckons only the protocanonical books as Old Testament, while stating the others are useful to be read, but not enumerated in the Old Testament because they do not exist in the Hebrew.

== In Ethiopian Orthodox Tewahedo Church ==
In the Bible used by the Eritrean and Ethiopian Orthodox Tewahedo churches, those books of the Old Testament that are still counted as canonical, but which are not agreed upon by all other churches, are often set in a separate section titled "deuterocanonical" (ዲዩትሮካኖኒካል). The Ethiopian Orthodox Deuterocanon, in addition to the standard set listed above, and with the books of Esdras and the Prayer of Manasseh, also includes some books that are still held canonical by only the Ethiopian Church, including the Book of Enoch, the Book of Jubilees, and the three books of Meqabyan (which are sometimes wrongly confused with the Books of the Maccabees).

The Book of Enoch is unusual as it was quoted in the New Testament. 1 Enoch 1:9 is directly and explicitly quoted in Jude 1:14-15 and may be alluded to in Galatians 5:19. It is not part of the canon of any other churches.

== In Protestantism ==
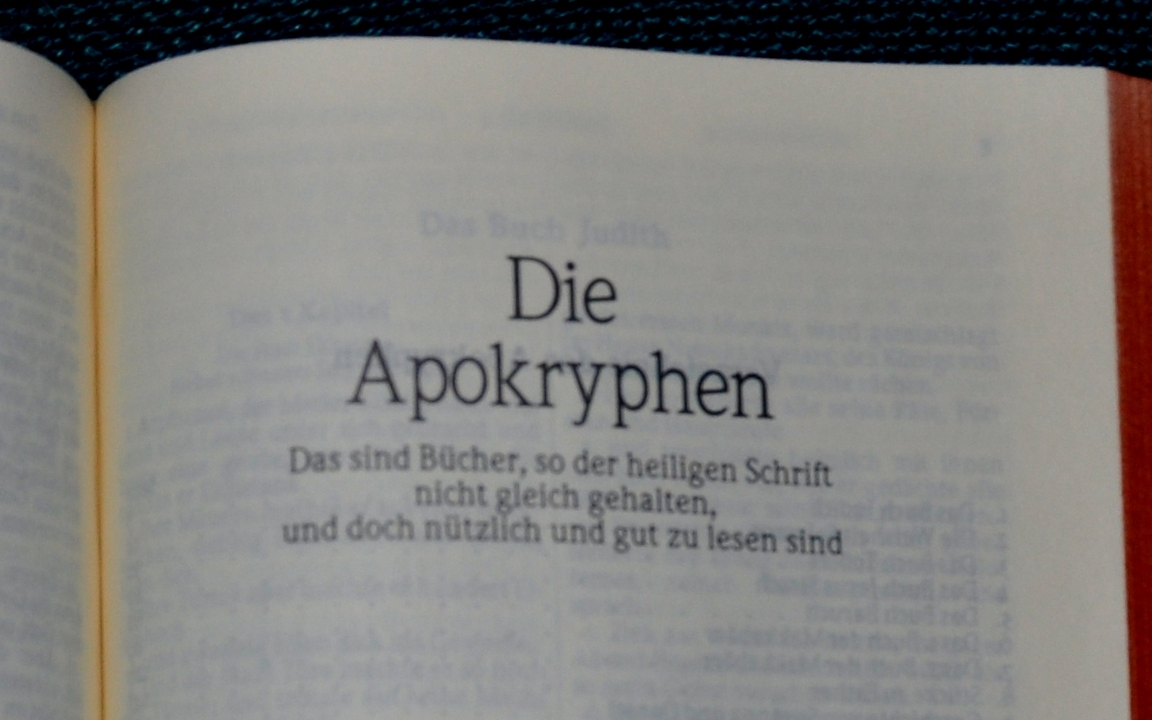
Copies of the Luther Bible include the deuterocanonical books as an intertestamental section between the Old Testament and New Testament; they are termed the "Apocrypha" in Christian churches having their origins in the Reformation.

Most Protestant churches do not accept the deuterocanonical books as part of the Old Testament canon and instead classify them as Apocrypha, often including them in a separate section or omitting them entirely. Some traditions, such as Lutheran and Anglican churches, have historically regarded these books as useful for reading and instruction, though not as authoritative Scripture.

=== Anabaptist churches ===
Anabaptists use the Luther Bible, which contains the Apocrypha as intertestamental books, which has much overlap with the Catholic deuterocanonical books; Amish wedding ceremonies include "the retelling of the marriage of Tobias and Sarah in the Apocrypha".

The fathers of Anabaptism, such as Menno Simons, quoted "them [the Apocrypha] with the same authority and nearly the same frequency as books of the Hebrew Bible" and the texts regarding the martyrdoms under Antiochus IV in 1 Maccabees and 2 Maccabees are held in high esteem by the Anabaptists, who faced persecution in their history.

=== Anglican Communion ===
The Thirty-nine Articles of Religion of the Church of England lists the deuterocanonical books as suitable to be read for "example of life and instruction of manners, but yet doth not apply them to establish any doctrine". The early lectionaries of the Anglican Church (as included in the Book of Common Prayer of 1662) included the deuterocanonical books amongst the cycle of readings, and passages from them were used regularly in services (such as the Kyrie Pantokrator and the Benedicite).

Readings from the deuterocanonical books are now included in many modern lectionaries in the Anglican Communion, based on the Revised Common Lectionary (in turn based on the post-conciliar Roman Catholic lectionary), though alternative readings from protocanonical books are also provided. There is a great deal of overlap between the Apocrypha section of the original 1611 King James Bible and the Catholic deuterocanon, but the two are distinct.

The Apocrypha section of the original 1611 King James Bible includes, in addition to the deuterocanonical books, the following three books, which were not included in the list of the canonical books by the Council of Trent:

- 1 Esdras (Vulgate 3 Esdras)
- 2 Esdras (Vulgate 4 Esdras)
- Prayer of Manasseh

Using the word apocrypha (Greek: "hidden away") to describe texts, although not necessarily pejorative, implies that the writings in question should not be included in the canon of the Bible. This classification commingles them with certain non-canonical gospels and New Testament apocrypha. The Society of Biblical Literature recommends the use of the term deuterocanonical books instead of Apocrypha in academic writing.

=== Lutheran churches ===
Luther termed the deuterocanonical books "Apocrypha, that is, books which are not considered equal to the Holy Scriptures, but are useful and good to read." These are included in copies of the Luther Bible as intertestamental books between the Old Testament and New Testament.

=== Methodist and Moravian churches ===
The first Methodist liturgical book, The Sunday Service of the Methodists, employs verses from the deuterocanonical books, such as in the Eucharistic liturgy.

The Revised Common Lectionary, in use by most mainline Protestants including Methodists and Moravians, lists readings from the deuterocanonical books in the liturgical kalendar, although alternate Old Testament scripture lessons are provided.

=== Presbyterian churches ===
The Westminster Confession of Faith, a Calvinist document that serves as a systematic summary of doctrine for the Church of Scotland and other Presbyterian churches worldwide, recognizes only the sixty-six books of the Protestant canon as authentic scripture. Chapter 1, Article 3 of the Confession reads: "The books commonly called Apocrypha, not being of divine inspiration, are no part of the Canon of Scripture; and therefore are of no authority in the Church of God, nor to be any otherwise approved, or made use of, than other human writings."

=== Reformed churches ===
The Belgic Confession, used in Reformed churches, devotes a section (Article 6) to "the difference between the canonical and apocryphal books" and says of them: "All which the Church may read and take instruction from, so far as they agree with the canonical books; but they are far from having such power and efficacy as that we may from their testimony confirm any point of faith or of the Christian religion; much less to detract from the authority of the other sacred books."

== New Testament deuterocanonicals ==
The term deuterocanonical is sometimes used to describe the canonical antilegomena, those books of the New Testament which, like the deuterocanonicals of the Old Testament, were not universally accepted by the early Church. The antilegomena or "disputed writings" were widely read in the Early Church and include:

- The Epistle to the Hebrews
- The Epistle of James
- The Second Epistle of Peter
- The Second Epistle of John
- The Third Epistle of John
- The Epistle of Jude
- The Book of Revelation
- The Apocalypse of Peter
- The Acts of Paul
- The Shepherd of Hermas
- The Epistle of Barnabas
- The Didache

== See also ==
- Biblical apocrypha
- Biblical canon
- Pseudepigrapha
