= Prayer of Manasseh =

Penitential prayer attributed to king Manasseh of Judah

The Prayer of Manasseh is a short, penitential prayer attributed to king Manasseh of Judah.

The majority of scholars believe that the Prayer of Manasseh was written in Greek (while a minority argues for a Semitic original) in the second or first century BC. It is recognised that it could also have been written in the first half of the 1st century AD, but in any case before the Destruction of the Second Temple in 70 AD. Another work by the same title, written in Hebrew, was found among the Dead Sea Scrolls (4Q381:17).

== Origin ==
Manasseh is recorded in the Bible as one of the most idolatrous kings of Judah (2 Kings 21:1–18; 2 Chronicles 33:1–9). The second Book of Chronicles, but not the second Book of Kings, records that Manasseh was taken captive by the Assyrians (2 Chronicles 33:11–13). While a prisoner, Manasseh prayed for mercy, and upon being freed and restored to the throne turned from his idolatrous ways (2 Chronicles 33:15–17). A reference to a penitential prayer, but not the prayer itself, is made in 2 Chronicles 33:19, which says that the prayer is written in "the annals of the kings of Israel".

== Prayer ==
O Lord Almighty, God of our ancestors, of Abraham and Isaac and Jacob and of their righteous offspring, you who made heaven and earth with all their order, who shackled the sea by your word of command, who confined the deep and sealed it with your terrible and glorious name, at whom all things shudder and tremble before your power, for your glorious splendor cannot be borne, and the wrath of your threat to sinners is unendurable; yet immeasurable and unsearchable is your promised mercy, for you are the Lord Most High, of great compassion, long-suffering, and very merciful, and you relent at human suffering. O Lord, according to your great goodness you have promised repentance and forgiveness to those who have sinned against you, and in the multitude of your mercies you have appointed repentance for sinners, so that they may be saved. Therefore you, O Lord, God of the righteous, have not appointed repentance for the righteous, for Abraham and Isaac and Jacob, who did not sin against you, but you have appointed repentance for me, who am a sinner.

For the sins I have committed are more in number than the sand of the sea; my transgressions are multiplied, O Lord, they are multiplied! I am not worthy to look up and see the height of heaven because of the multitude of my iniquities. I am weighted down with many an iron fetter, so that I am rejected because of my sins, and I have no relief, for I have provoked your wrath and have done what is evil in your sight, setting up abominations and multiplying offenses.

And now I bend the knee of my heart, imploring you for your kindness. I have sinned, O Lord, I have sinned, and I acknowledge my transgressions. I earnestly implore you, forgive me, O Lord, forgive me! Do not destroy me with my transgressions! Do not be angry with me forever or store up evil for me; do not condemn me to the depths of the earth. For you, O Lord, are the God of those who repent, and in me you will manifest your goodness, for, unworthy as I am, you will save me according to your great mercy, and I will praise you continually all the days of my life. For all the host of heaven sings your praise, and yours is the glory forever. Amen

== Canonicity ==
The prayer's canonicity is disputed. It appears in ancient Syriac, Old Slavonic, Ethiopic, and Armenian translations. In the Ethiopian Bible, the prayer is found in 2 Chronicles. The earliest Greek text is the fifth-century Codex Alexandrinus. A Hebrew manuscript of the prayer was found in Cairo Geniza. It is considered apocryphal by Jews, Catholics and Protestants. It was placed at the end of 2 Chronicles in the late 4th-century Vulgate. Over a millennium later, Martin Luther included the prayer in his 74-book translation of the Bible into German. It was part of the 1537 Matthew Bible, and the 1599 Geneva Bible. It also appears in the Apocrypha of the 1611 King James Bible and of the original 1609/1610 Douai-Rheims Bible. Pope Clement VIII included the prayer in an appendix to the Vulgate.

The prayer is included in some editions of the Greek Septuagint. For example, the 5th century Codex Alexandrinus includes the prayer among fourteen Odes appearing just after the Psalms. It is accepted as a deuterocanonical book by Orthodox Christians.

== Liturgical use ==
The prayer is chanted during the Eastern Orthodox Christian and Byzantine Catholic service of Great Compline.

It is used in the Roman Rite as part of the Responsory after the first reading in the Office of Readings on the 14th Sunday in Ordinary Time (along with Psalm 51). In the Extraordinary Form, in the Roman Rite Breviary; in the corpus of responsories sung with the readings from the books of Kings between Trinity Sunday and August, the seventh cites the Prayer of Manasseh, together with verses of Psalm 51, the penitential Psalm par excellence.

It is used also as a canticle in the Daily Office of the 1979 U.S. Book of Common Prayer used by the Episcopal Church in the United States of America, and as Canticle 52 in Common Worship: Daily Prayer of the Church of England, particularly used during Lent.
