= Book of Wisdom =

Jewish work written in Greek generally dated to the mid-first century BC

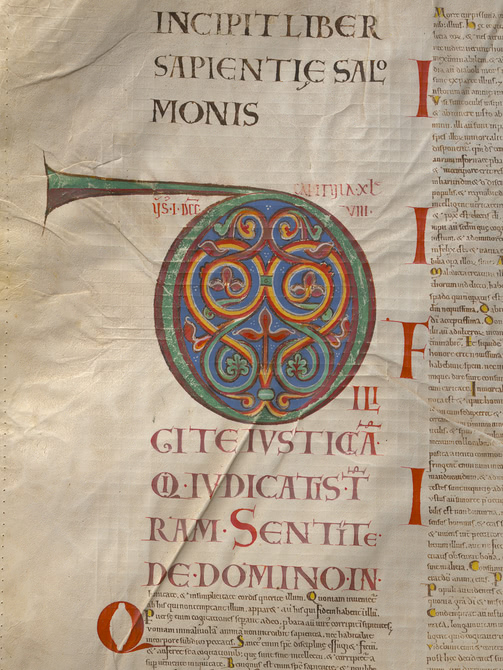
Start of the Book of Wisdom in the Codex Gigas

The Book of Wisdom, also known as the Wisdom of Solomon, is a book in some Christian biblical canons. It is one of the seven sapiential—or wisdom—books in the Septuagint, the others being the Psalms, the Book of Proverbs, the book of Ecclesiastes, Song of Songs (Song of Solomon), the Book of Job, and the Wisdom of Sirach. Wisdom is one of the deuterocanonical books (i.e., it is included in the canons of the major non-Protestant Christian churches).

Most forms of Protestantism consider Wisdom part of the biblical apocrypha, and it is not included in the Rabbinic Jewish canon. While not included in the Hebrew Bible, it found early reception in the Septuagint and Old Latin tradition and was known to some of the early Christian New Testament writers. It was composed in Greek by an Alexandrian Jewish author. Most scholars date it to the first century BC on the basis of its themes and concerns, though a minority have proposed dates spanning from the reign of Solomon to that of Caligula.

The central theme of the work is "wisdom" itself, appearing under two principal aspects. The first aspect is, in its relation to mankind, wisdom is the perfection of knowledge of the righteous as a gift from God showing itself in action. The second aspect is, in direct relation to God, wisdom is with God from all eternity.

== Structure, genre and content ==
The 19 chapters of the work can be grouped into three sections. Lester Grabbe organises these as follows:

1. Book of Eschatology - chapters 1-5:
  - exhortation to justice
  - speech of the impious, contrasts of the wicked and the just
  - exhortation to wisdom
2. Book of Wisdom - chapters 6-9:
  - Solomon's speech concerning wisdom, wealth, power and prayer
3. Book of History - chapters 10-19:
  - introduction, followed by diptychs of plagues
  - digression on God's power and mercy
  - digression on false worship and further plagues
  - recapitulation and concluding doxology.

The book is addressed to the rulers of the earth, urging them to "love righteousness" and seek wisdom; the wicked think that all is chance and that they should enjoy each day, but they are deluded. In the second section Solomon (not explicitly named, but strongly implied) tells of his search for wisdom.

The Wisdom of Solomon can be linked to several forms of ancient literature, both Jewish and non-Jewish, but it clearly belongs with biblical Wisdom books such as the Book of Job, one of only five such books among ancient Jewish literature. In terms of classical genre it has been identified as an encomium and with the Greek genre of the "exhortatory discourse", by which a teacher attempts to persuade others to a certain course of action.

== Canonicity ==
Origen in the 2nd century AD refers to uncertainty about the Book of Wisdom. Melito of Sardis (possibly) in the 2nd century AD, Augustine (c. 397) and Pope Innocent I (405) considered Wisdom of Solomon as part of the Old Testament. Athanasius writes that the Book of Wisdom along with three other deuterocanonical books, while not being part of the Canon, "were appointed by the Fathers to be read". Epiphanius of Salamis (c. 385) mentions that the Wisdom of Solomon was of disputed canonicity. According to the monk Rufinus of Aquileia (c. 400 AD) the Book of Wisdom was categorized as "ecclesiastical" rather than "canonical".

The Book of Wisdom was listed as canonical by the Council of Rome (382), the Synod of Hippo (393), the Council of Carthage (397) and the Council of Carthage (419), the Quinisext Council (692), the Council of Florence (in 1442) and the Council of Trent (in 1546). It is regarded as scripture by the Catholic Church, the Eastern Orthodox Church, the Oriental Orthodox Churches, and the Assyrian Church of the East.

According to John of Damascus in his Exposition of the Orthodox Faith (c. 730) the Book of Wisdom is not in the ark: "There are also the Panaretus, that is the Wisdom of Solomon, and the Wisdom of Jesus, which was published in Hebrew by the father of Sirach, and afterwards translated into Greek by his grandson, Jesus, the Son of Sirach. These are virtuous and noble, but are not counted nor were they placed in the ark."

== Composition ==
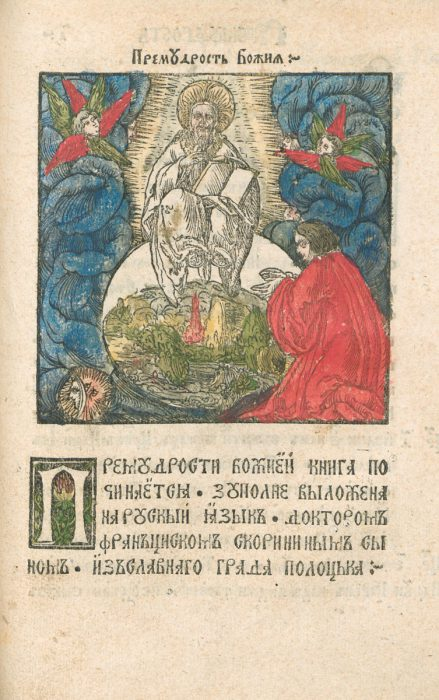
Image from "Book of Wisdom" of Francysk Skaryna 1518 (Belarusian)

There is a general consensus among scholars (with only a few dissenting voices) that the Wisdom of Solomon was written in Greek in Alexandria around the turn of the era: late first century BC to early first century AD. Alexandria is where the Greek Bible was translated and assembled. What is known of the Jewish community there accords with what can be deduced from the text about the audience for which it was written. It shares an outlook similar to that of other texts such as 4 Maccabees, Letter of Aristeas, and the works of Philo, which all came from this community. One specific indication of Egyptian origin is the author's use of Egyptian imagery of the goddess Isis to describe personified Wisdom as a divine female figure. Another is the very clear interest in Egypt revealed in the book's third section (chapters 10–19). Chapter 10 begins a review of Israel's history but never gets beyond the Exodus story, where the text indulges in a sharp polemic against idolatry in its particular Egyptian manifestation—that is, the animal cult (see 12:24; 15:18–19). There are no clear allusions to contemporary historical events in the book, so one can suggest only an approximate date for it. Since the author quotes from most parts of the LXX version of the Hebrew Bible, he cannot have been writing much before the middle of the second century BC.

Winston 1979: 20-25 argues that the earliest date for the book can be more precisely fixed as sometime after the Roman conquest of Egypt in 30 BC on the grounds that 14:16–20 alludes to the emperor cult begun under Augustus. He confirms this conclusion by analyzing the thirty-five Greek words in the Wisdom of Solomon that were not attested in other Greek literature before the first century AD. Larcher 1983: 1:141-61 argues that the book was composed between 31 and 10 BC. The latest possible date for the work is more difficult to fix than the earliest. Most scholars feel that Wisdom predates Philo and was also used by some New Testament authors, particularly Paul and the author of the Epistle to the Hebrews. This would make it no later than the early first century AD. Winston dates it precisely to the reign of Caligula (AD 37–41) when the Alexandrian Jewish community underwent a particularly severe crisis, which he feels is reflected in the harsh anti-Gentile tone of the book. Larcher is not convinced of this later dating. It is safest to say that the Wisdom of Solomon was probably written about thirty years on either side of the turn of the era.

It is uncertain whether the book has a single author or comes from a school of writers: it is said to be "written by the friends of Solomon in his honour" in the Muratorian fragment, but more recent scholarship has favoured regarding it as a unified work. In either case, its blend of Greek and Jewish features suggests a learned Hellenistic background. The authors' primary literary source was the Septuagint, in particular the Wisdom literature and the Book of Isaiah, and he or they were familiar with late Jewish works such as the Book of Enoch, and with Greek philosophical literature. Despite the address to the "rulers of the world", the actual audience was probably members of the authors' own community who were tempted to give up their Jewishness in the face of the temptations of Greek culture and the hostile conditions facing Jews in the Greek world.

== Themes ==
The book opens with the opposed pairs righteousness/unrighteousness and death/immortality: those who do not follow righteousness will fall into "senseless reasoning" and will not be open to wisdom; wisdom is not an inherent human quality nor one that can be taught, but comes from outside, and only to those who are prepared through righteousness. The suffering of the righteous will be rewarded with immortality, while the wicked will end miserably. The unrighteous are doomed because they do not know God's purpose, but the righteous will judge the unrighteous in God's presence. Lady Wisdom, first referred to as "she" in Wisdom 6:12, dominates the middle section of the book (chapters 6-9), in which Solomon speaks. She existed from the Creation, and God is her source and guide. She is to be loved and desired, and kings seek her: Solomon himself preferred wisdom to wealth, health, and all other things. She in turn has always come to the aid of the righteous, from Adam to the Exodus. The final section, chapters 10-19, takes up the theme of the rescue of the righteous, taking the Exodus as its focus: "You (God) have not neglected to help (your people the Jews) at all times and in all places." (Wisdom 19:22).

== Influences ==
=== Influences shaping the Book of Wisdom ===
The New American Bible Revised Edition notes that Wisdom 9:15, "for the corruptible body burdens the soul and the earthly tent weighs down the mind with its many concerns", "draws on the language of Plato concerning the human condition, [but] the conclusion is very biblical: God remains a mystery".

Nineteenth-century American author Herman Melville marked his copy of the Wisdom of Solomon heavily. Without knowledge of biblical criticism, he managed to note the interplay of Hellenistic Platonism and Jewish philosophy, writing, "this admirable book seems partly Mosaic & partly Platonic in its tone. Who wrote it I know not. Someone to whom both Plato and Moses stood for godfather." The interplay of multiple philosophies is exemplified in many of Melville's works, specifically Moby-Dick and Clarel, wherein religious and philosophical interplay represent the struggle for certainty in the 19th century.

=== Influences on Christian life and practice ===
According to Easton's Bible Dictionary, the term fall of man, which does not appear in the Hebrew Bible, probably originates from the Book of Wisdom.

A considerable portion of the Wisdom of Solomon, starting with Chapter 2, was read at a memorial service in Concord, Massachusetts, on December 2, 1859, the day of the execution of the abolitionist John Brown.

== Works cited ==
- Grabbe, Lester L. (2004). Wisdom of Solomon. A&C Black. ISBN 9780567084446.
- Hayman, A. Peter (2003). "The Wisdom of Solomon". In Dunn, James D. G.; Rogerson, John William (eds.). Eerdmans Commentary on the Bible. Eerdmans. ISBN 9780802837110.
- Horbury, William (2007). "43. The Wisdom of Solomon". In Barton, John; Muddiman, John (eds.). The Oxford Bible Commentary. Oxford University Press. ISBN 9780199277186.
- Tanzer, Sarah J. (1998). "The Wisdom of Solomon". In Newsom, Carol Ann; Ringe, Sharon H. (eds.). Women's Bible Commentary. Westminster John Knox Press. ISBN 9780664257811.

Preceded by Song of Solomon	Roman Catholic Old Testament	Succeeded by Sirach
Preceded by Song of Solomon	Eastern Orthodox Old Testament see Deuterocanon	Succeeded by Sirach
