= Book of Odes (Bible) =

Biblic hymns and prayers

The Book of Odes (Ancient Greek: Ὠδαί), also known as the Biblical Odes, refers to a collection of hymns and prayers referencing the Bible and used as part of liturgies in some denominations. Collections of odes can be found in every language of Christian literature from antiquity through the Middle Ages, especially in Greek, Latin, Coptic, Syriac, Arabic, Ethiopic, Armenian, Georgian, and Slavonic, and although there were some consistent selections, the extent of the list often varied. They are often circulated with or interwoven with the Psalms, although sometimes they were circulated as independent books. The biblical odes form the basis for the Eastern Orthodox canon sung during matins and other services.

== Background ==
The Odes were thought to have existed independently prior to being compiled into a list. Hippolytus of Rome wrote homilies on the Song of the Three Holy Children and the Song of Moses in the early third century. By the 4th century, Eusebius reported that many hymns and songs had been written. The earliest surviving collection is found in the fifth century Codex Alexandrinus, which contains 14 odes appended after the Psalms. By the 6th century, the list was predominantly circulating as a collection of the first nine.

== Content ==
The original collection of Odes was compiled early in the Roman imperial era and consisted of Old Testament songs and prayers found in prose contexts. The earliest collections can be found ranging from nine to sixteen text collections, although these. The critical Greek edition produced by Alfred Rahlfs presents the nine-ode Byzantine Greek sequence before the other Greek Odes, as well as including the Song of the Vineyard (Isaiah 5:1-9) as Ode 10 despite its absence in Codex Alexandrinus.

The listing of Odes as presented by Rahlfs are:

1. First Ode of Moses (Exodus 15:1–19)
2. Second Ode of Moses (Deuteronomy 32:1–43)
3. Prayer of Anna, the Mother of Samuel (1 Samuel 2:1–10)
4. Prayer of Habakkuk (Habakkuk 3:2–19)
5. Prayer of Isaiah (Isaiah 26:9–20)
6. Prayer of Jonah (Jonah 2:3–10)
7. Prayer of Azariah (Daniel 3:26–45, a deuterocanonical portion)
8. Song of the Three Holy Children (Daniel 3:52–90, a deuterocanonical portion)
9. The Magnificat; Prayer of Mary the Theotokos (Luke 1:46–55; here appended to the Benedictus, the Song of Zechariah in Luke 1:68-79)
10. The Song of the Vineyard: A Canticle of Isaiah (Isaiah 5:1–7)
11. Prayer of Hezekiah (Isaiah 38:10–20)
12. Prayer of Manasseh, King of Judah when he was held captive in Babylon (a deuterocanonical text sometimes appended to the Books of Chronicles and representing Manasseh's repentance in 2 Chronicles 33:11–13)
13. Nunc dimittis: Prayer of Simeon (Luke 2:29–32)
14. Gloria in Excelsis Deo: Canticle of the Early Morning (some lines from Luke 2:14, and Psalm 35:10-11; 118:12; and 144:2)

The fifth-century Codex Alexandrinus represents the oldest collection of Psalms and contains the Odes most commonly found in collections. They are listed as follows:

1. Song of the Sea (Exodus 15:1-19)
2. Song of Moses (Deuteronomy 32:1-43)
3. Prayer of Hannah (1 Samuel 2:1-10)
4. Song of Isaiah (Isaiah 26:9-20)
5. Prayer of Jonah (Jonah 2:3-10)
6. Prayer of Habakkuk (Habakkuk 3:2-19)
7. Prayer of Hezekiah (Isaiah 38:10-20)
8. Prayer of Manasseh
9. Prayer of Azariah (Daniel 3:26-45 [Th])
10. Prayer of the Three Young Men (Daniel 3:52-56, 57-88 [Th])
11. Magnificat (Luke 1:46-55)
12. Nunc Dimittis (Luke 2:29-32)
13. Benedictus (Luke 1:68-79)
14. Gloria (Luke 2:14 + liturgical text)

Later lists in Greek and other languages vary. Additional Odes include Isaiah 12:1-6 (Latin), Isaiah 5:1-7 (Greek, Latin), Isaiah 25:1-12 (Coptic), Isaiah 26:1-8 (Coptic), Daniel 3:1-97 (Coptic), Matthew 6:9-13 (Coptic, Syriac), Nicene Creed (Coptic, Syriac), Numbers 21 (Syriac), Judges 5 (Syriac), 2 Samuel 22, Isaiah 42:10-13 + 45:8 (Syriac), Matthew 5:3-12 (Syriac).

== See also ==
- Deuterocanonical books in Orthodox Christianity
- Odes of Solomon

Deuterocanon
Preceded by Psalms	Eastern Orthodox; Books of the Bible	Succeeded by Proverbs
