= Anna and the Blind Tobit =

Painting by Rembrandt

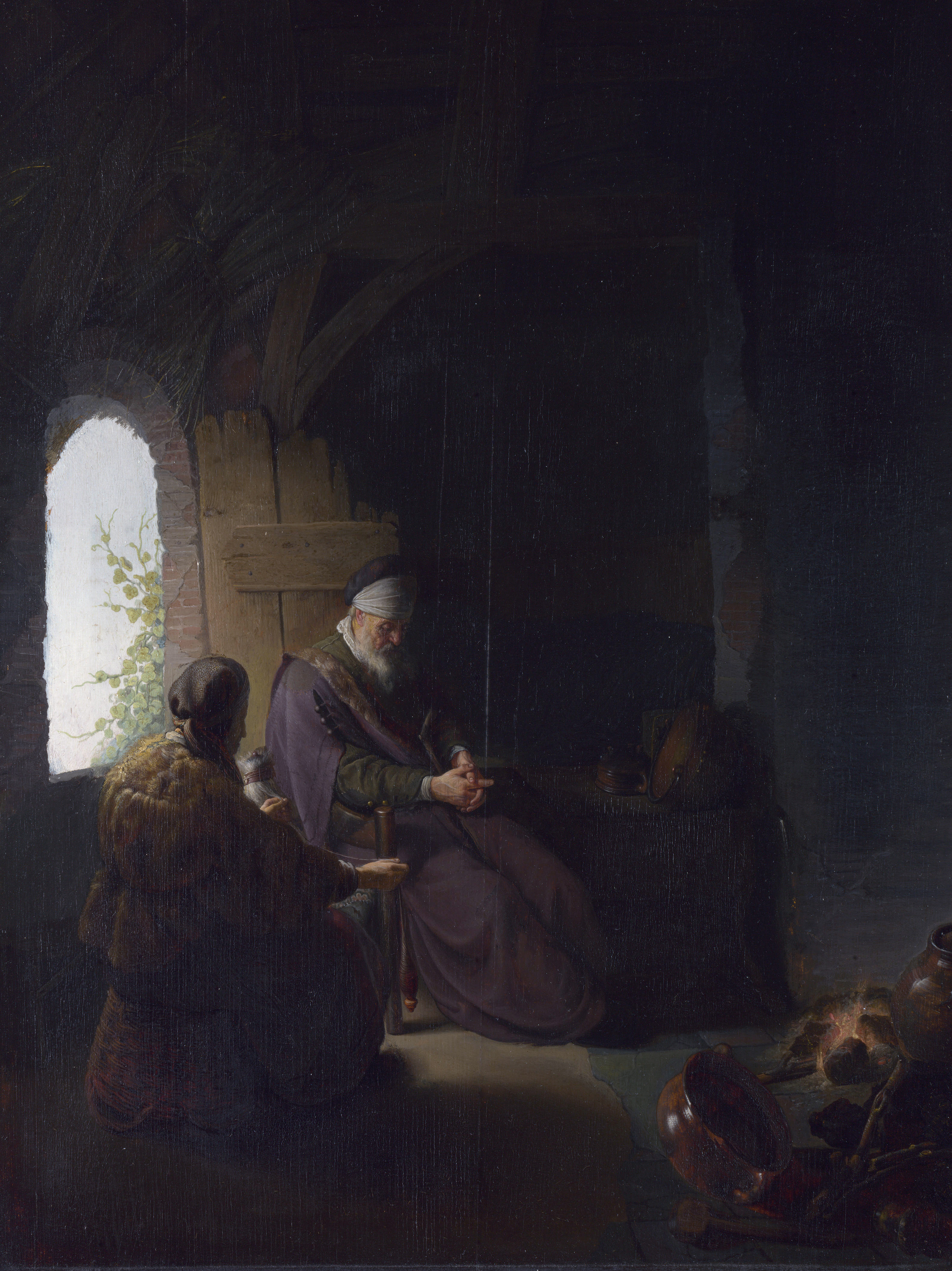
- Artist: Rembrandt
- Year: c. 1630
- Medium: Oil on oak
- Dimensions: 63.8 cm × 47.7 cm (25.1 in × 18.8 in)
- Location: National Gallery, London
- Accession: NG4189

Anna and the Blind Tobit, also titled Blind Tobit and his Wife, is a c. 1630 oil painting by the Dutch Golden Age painter Rembrandt, and perhaps his pupil, Gerrit Dou. The picture hangs in room 22 of the National Gallery in London.

== Background ==
The story of Anna, her husband Tobit and their son Tobias is told in the apocryphal Book of Tobit. God tested them by reducing them to poverty and causing Tobit's blindness. In the 17th century they were considered to be examples of piety in adversity. Rembrandt painted a number of episodes from the story, and in this picture he depicts the old couple waiting for the return of their son, Tobias, who has embarked on a long journey to restore his parents' fortunes.

== Attribution ==
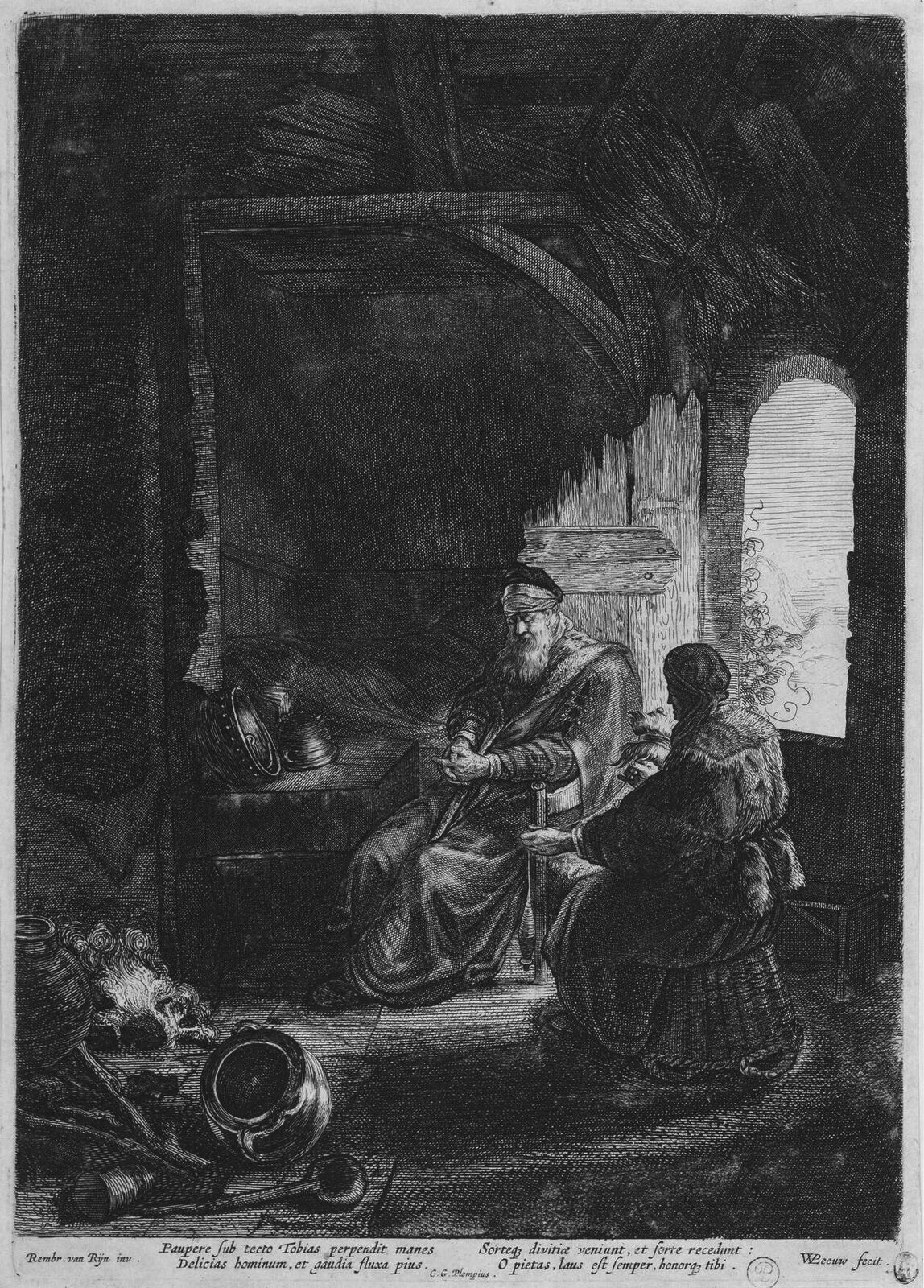
Engraving by Willem van der Leeuw, c. 1630–1665

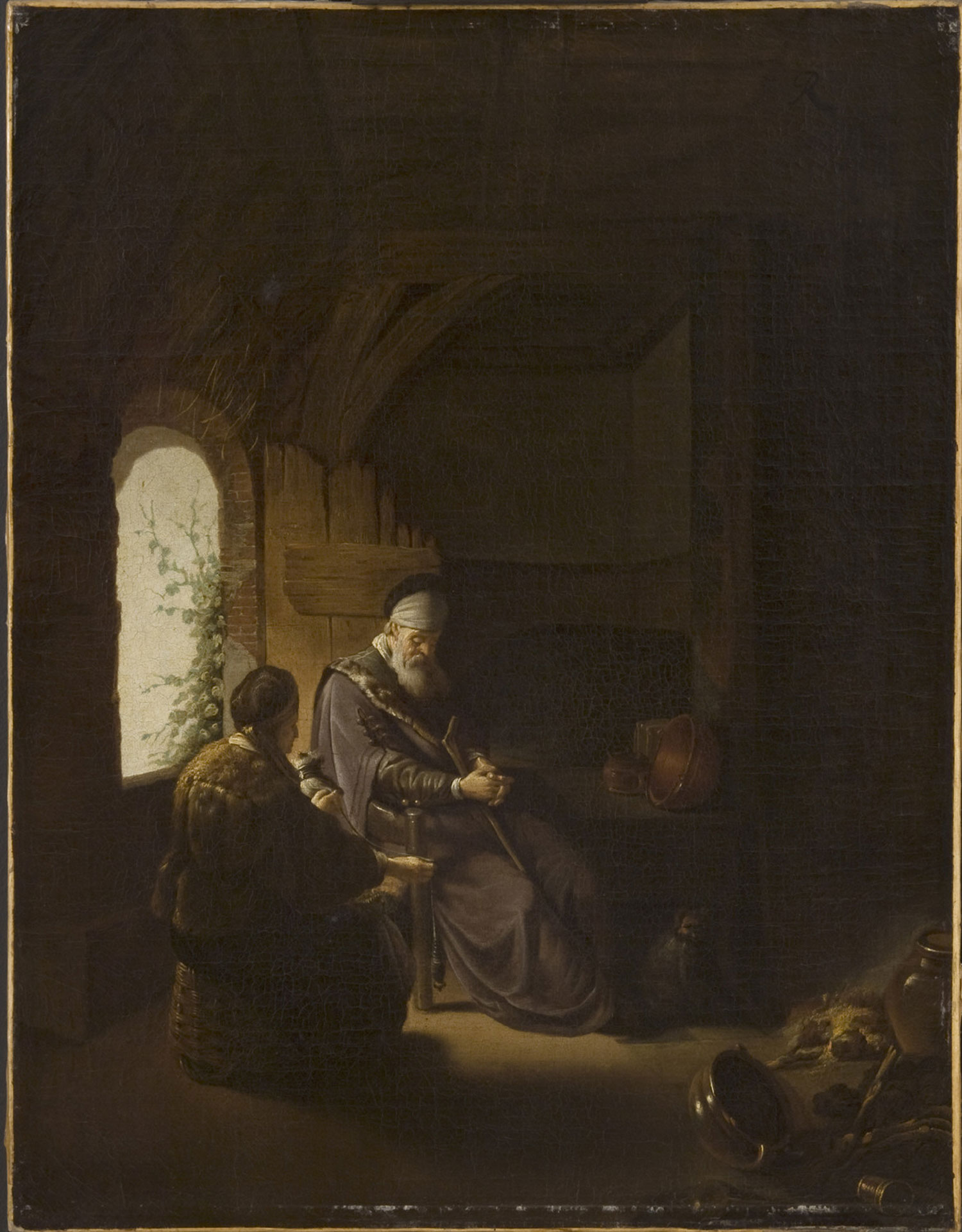
Anonymous copy, 1660s

This painting was engraved as the work of Rembrandt during his lifetime, but it has subsequently been argued that its meticulous detail suggests that it was either a collaboration between Rembrandt and his Leiden pupil Gerrit Dou, or by Dou alone. Recent comparisons with the work of Rembrandt and Dou have made it clear that the painting is, in fact, an authentic work by Rembrandt painted in about 1630. Some traces of a signature can be seen: "Re[.]bra[…]".

== Provenance ==
- by 1881: John Bell 1 February 1881–5 February 1881: sale of the collection of John Bell at an unknown auction house, Glasgow, lot no. 357 (as [Gerard] Dou);
- Unknown date: acquired by Sir Remy Watson, Braco Castle, Perthshire;
- by 1926: Dennis Elliot Watson, London;
- 1926: purchased by the National Gallery, London.

== Related works ==
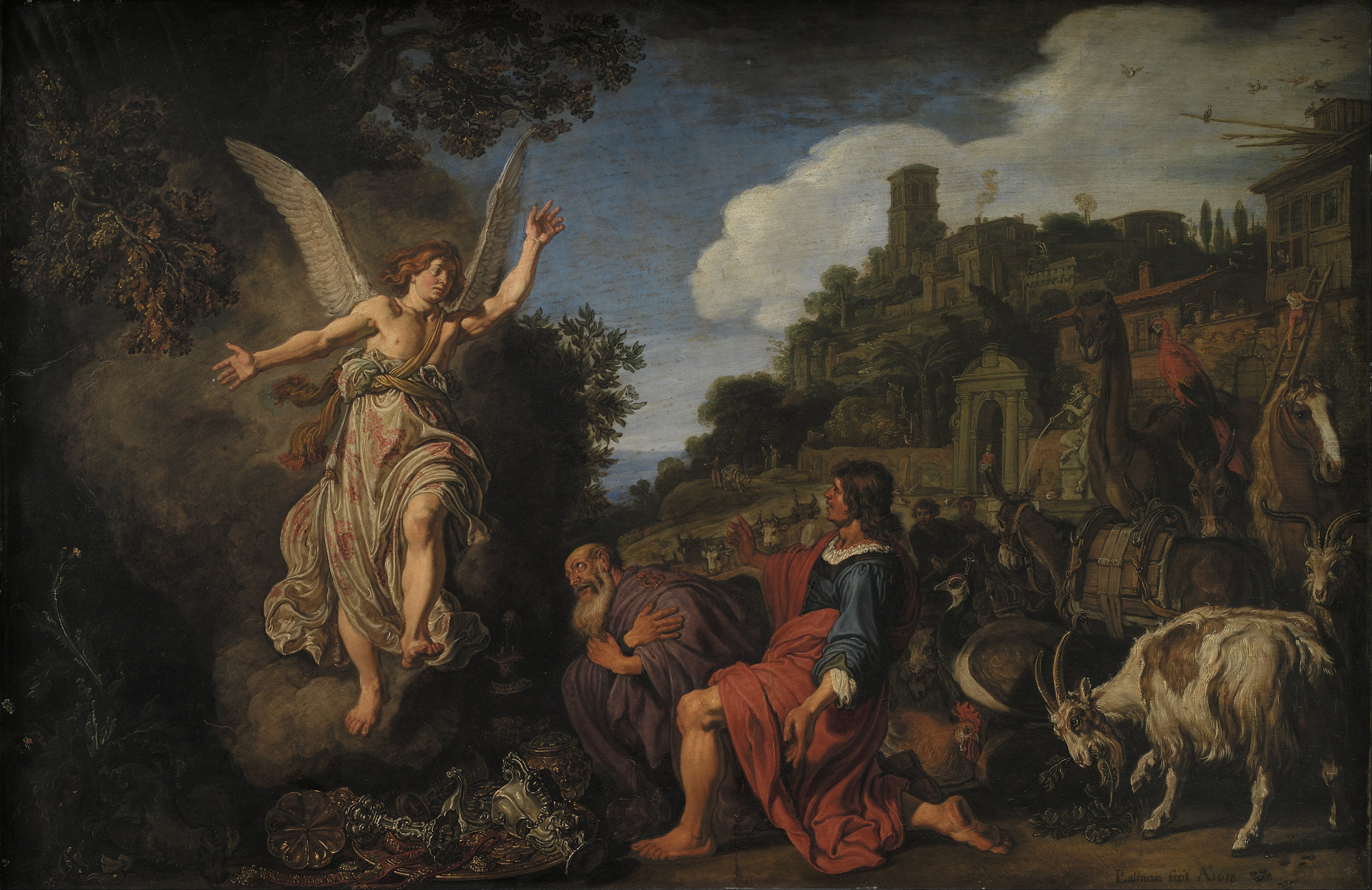
Pieter Lastman: The Angel Raphael Takes Leave of Old Tobit and his Son Tobias, 1618

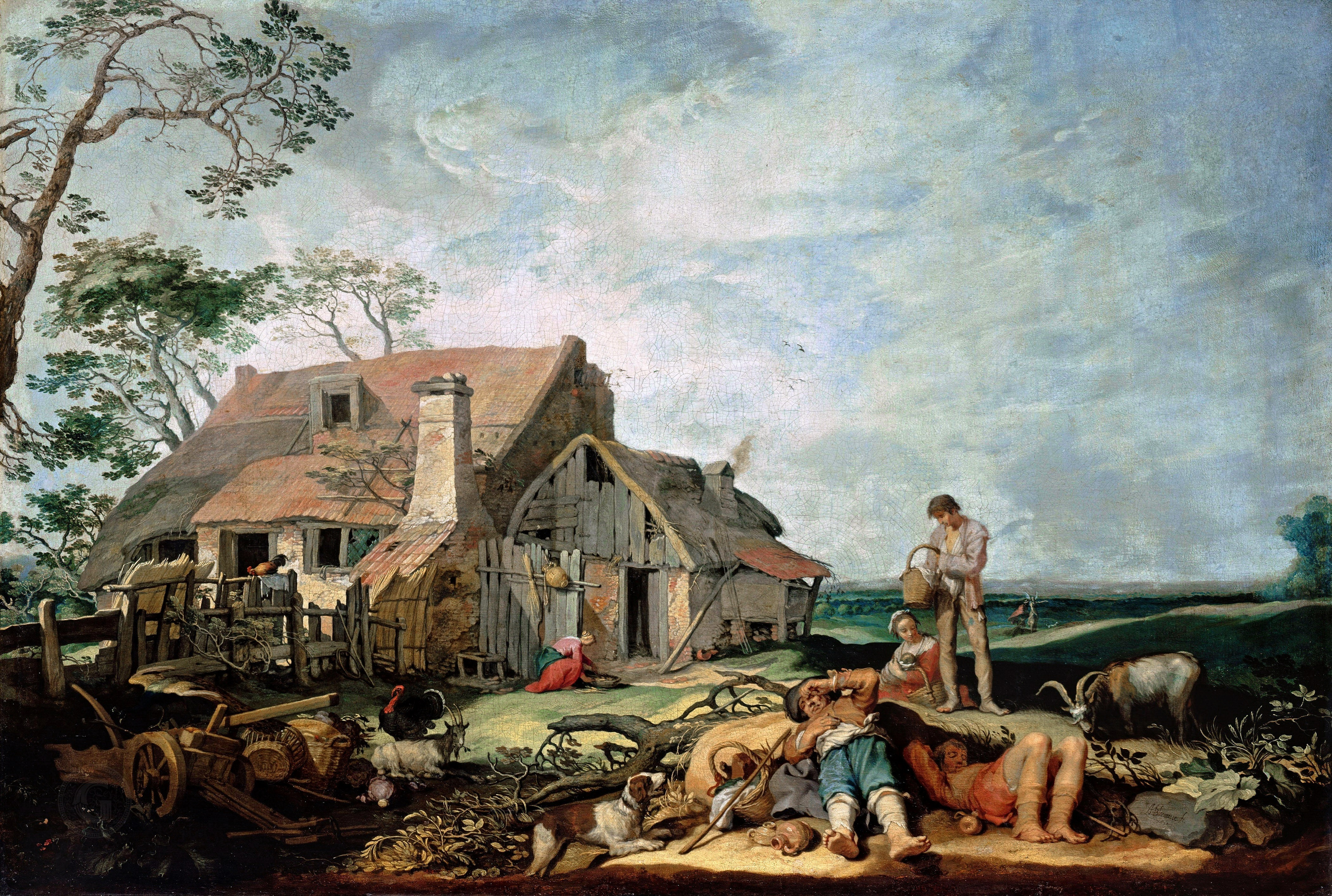
Abraham Bloemaert: Landscape with the Exodus of Tobias and the Angel, 1630

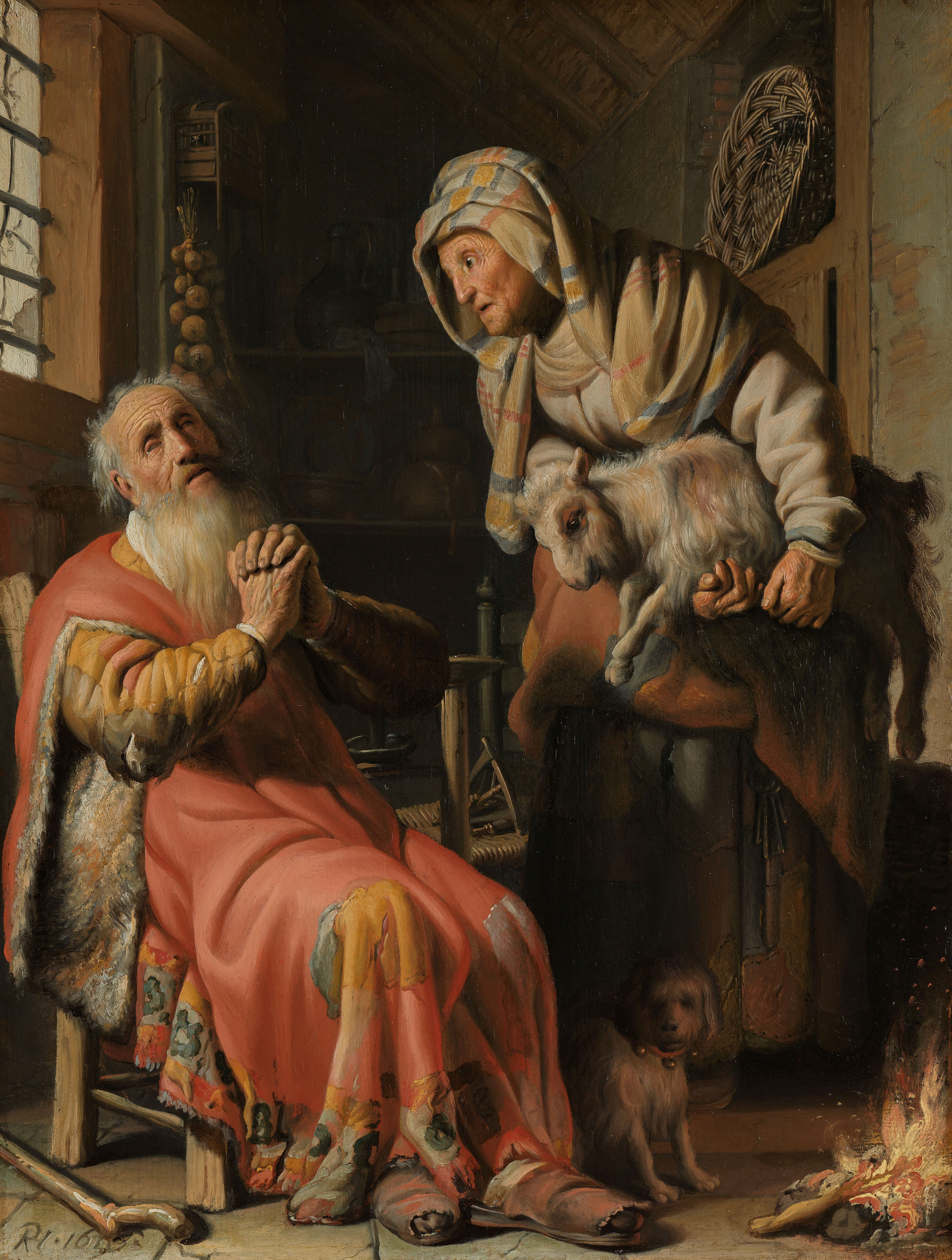
Rembrandt: Tobit and Anna with the Kid, 1626

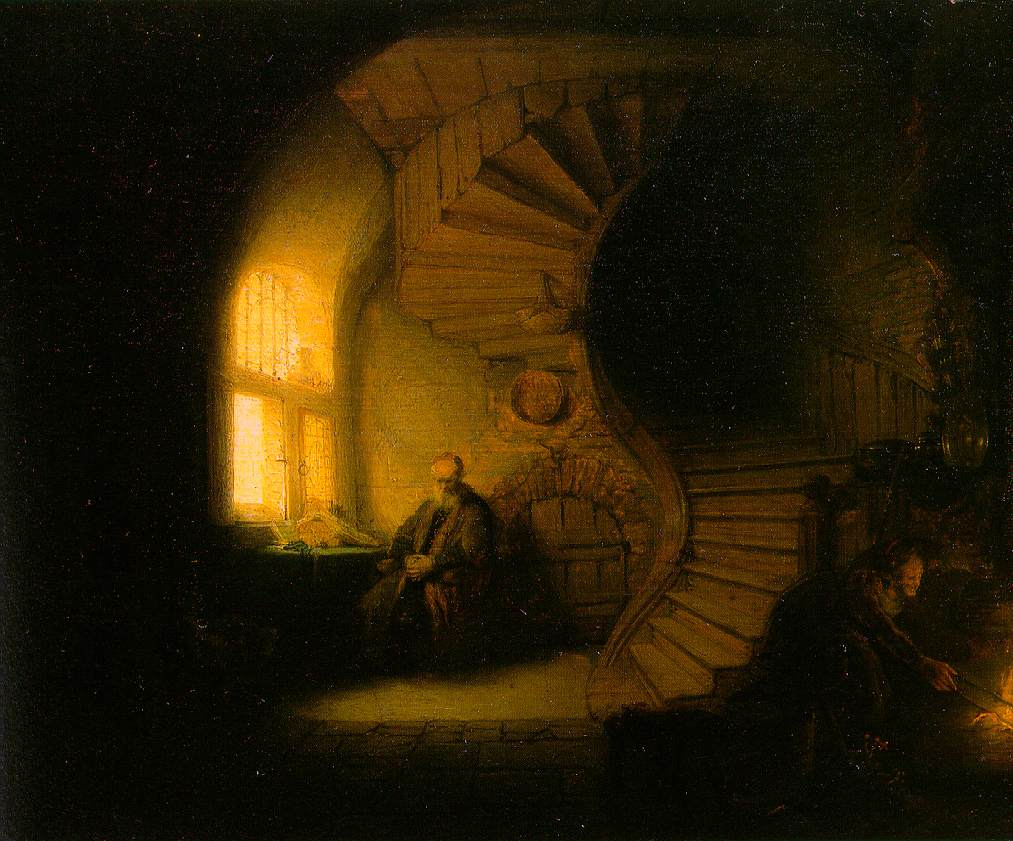
Rembrandt: Philosopher in Meditation, 1632

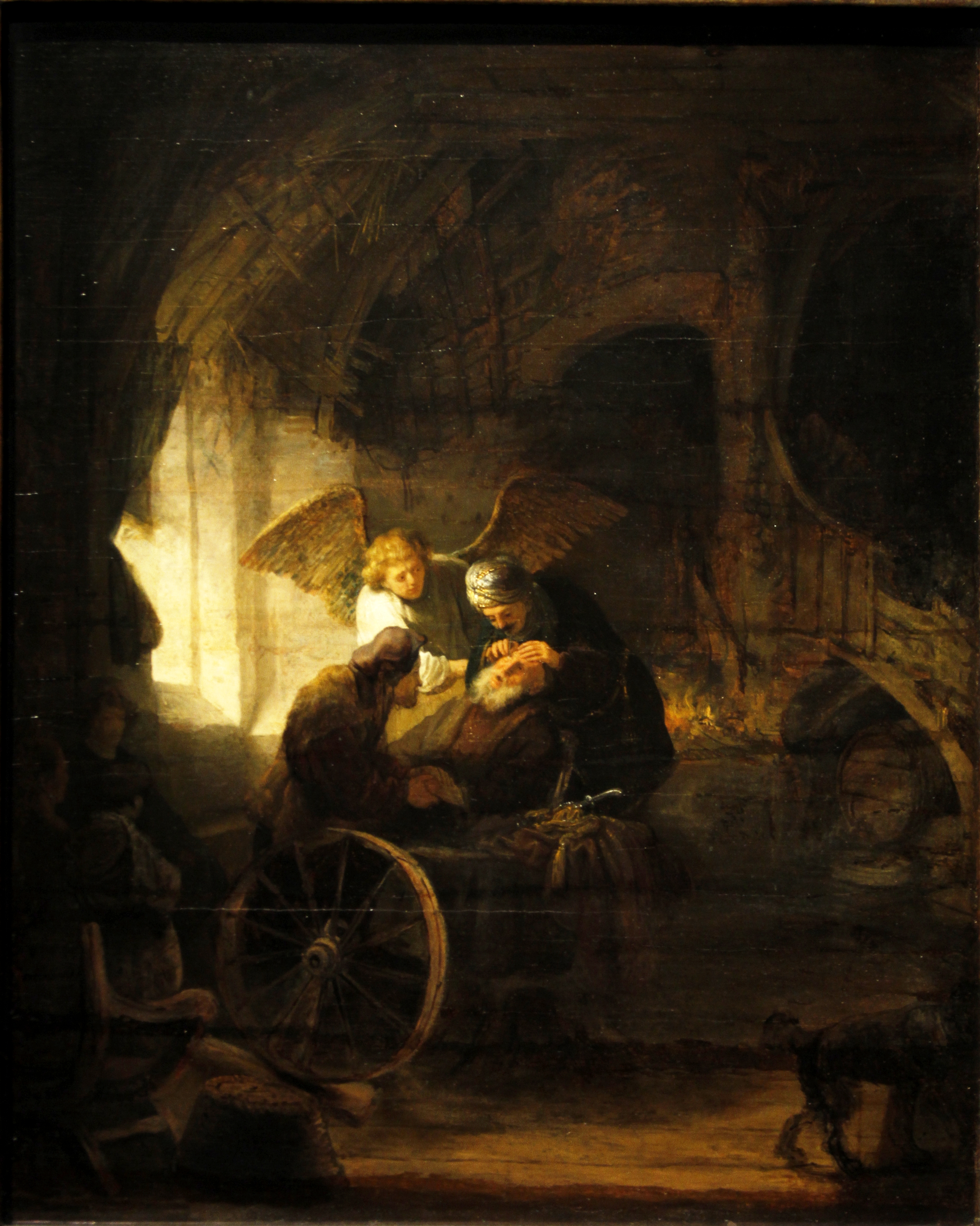
Rembrandt: Tobias Healing his Blind Father, 1636

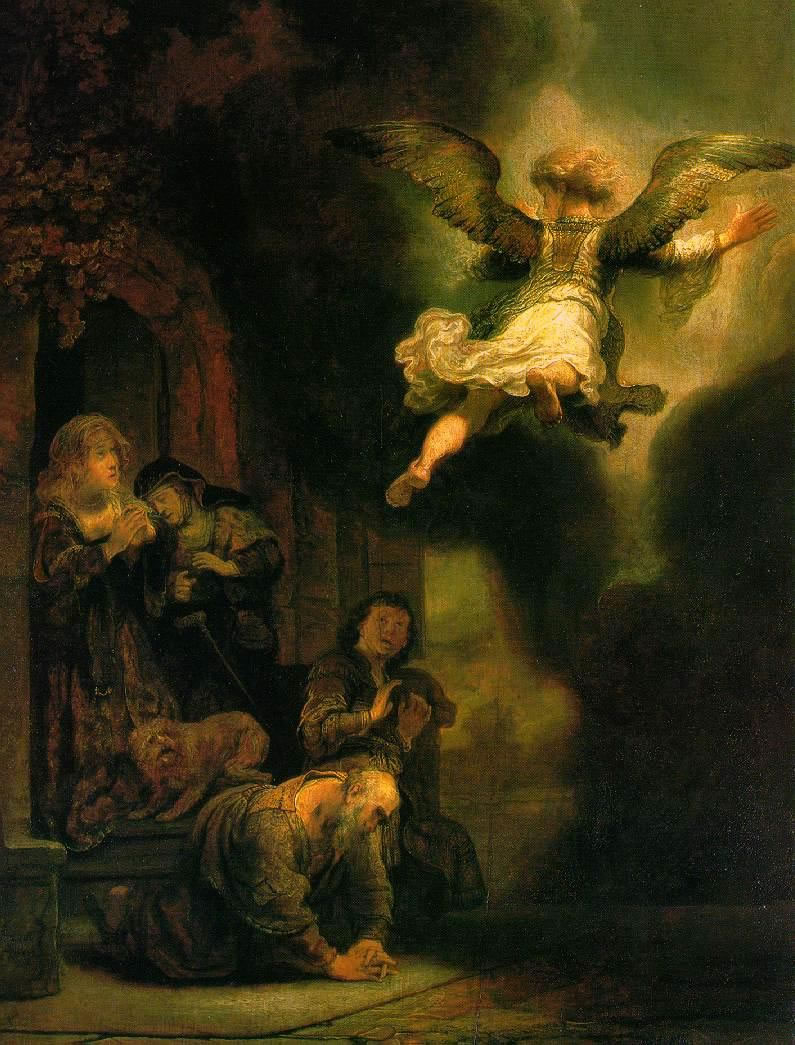
Rembrandt: The Angel Raphael Leaving Tobias' Family, 1637

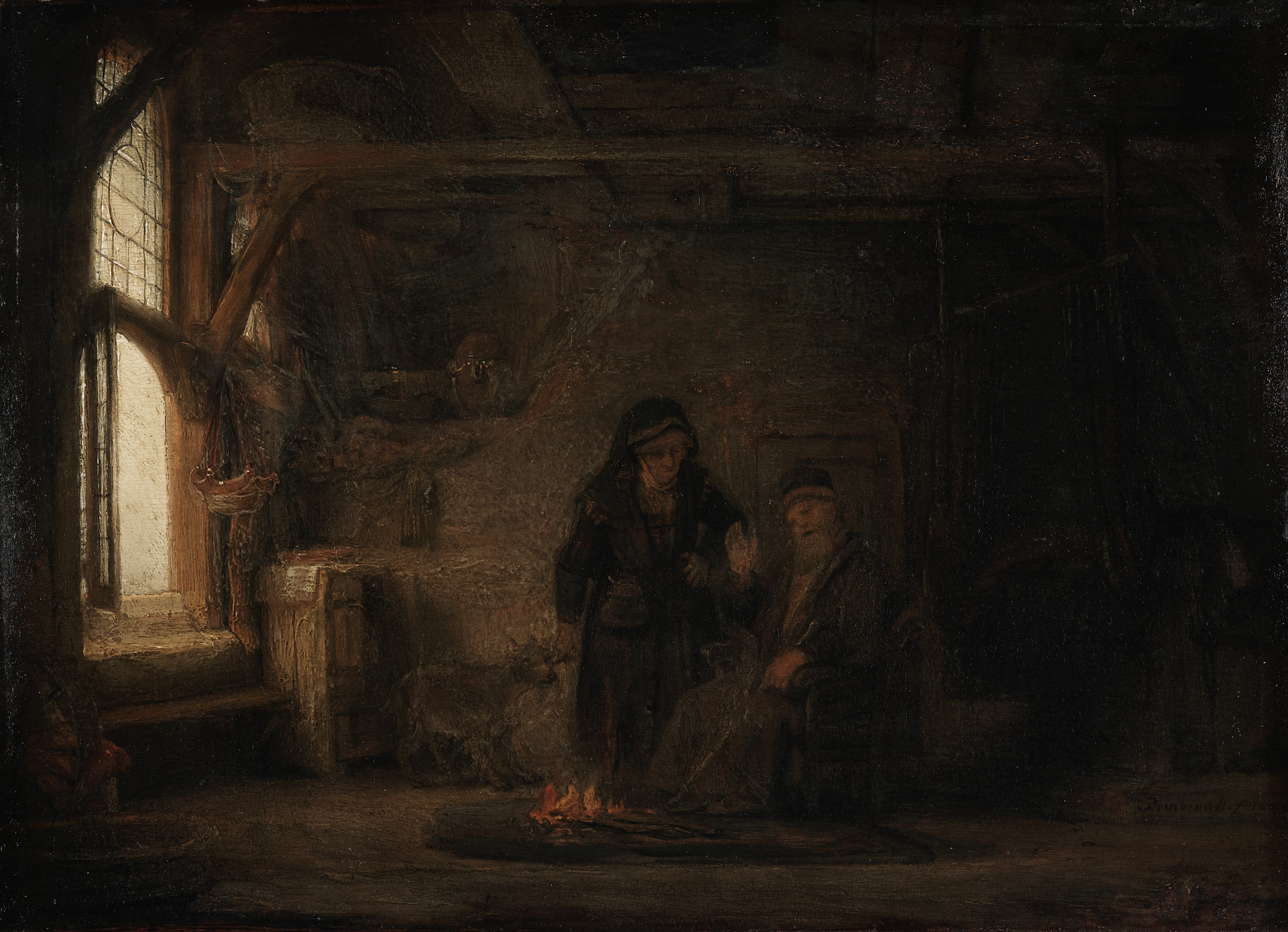
Rembrandt and workshop: Tobit and Anna with the Kid, 1645

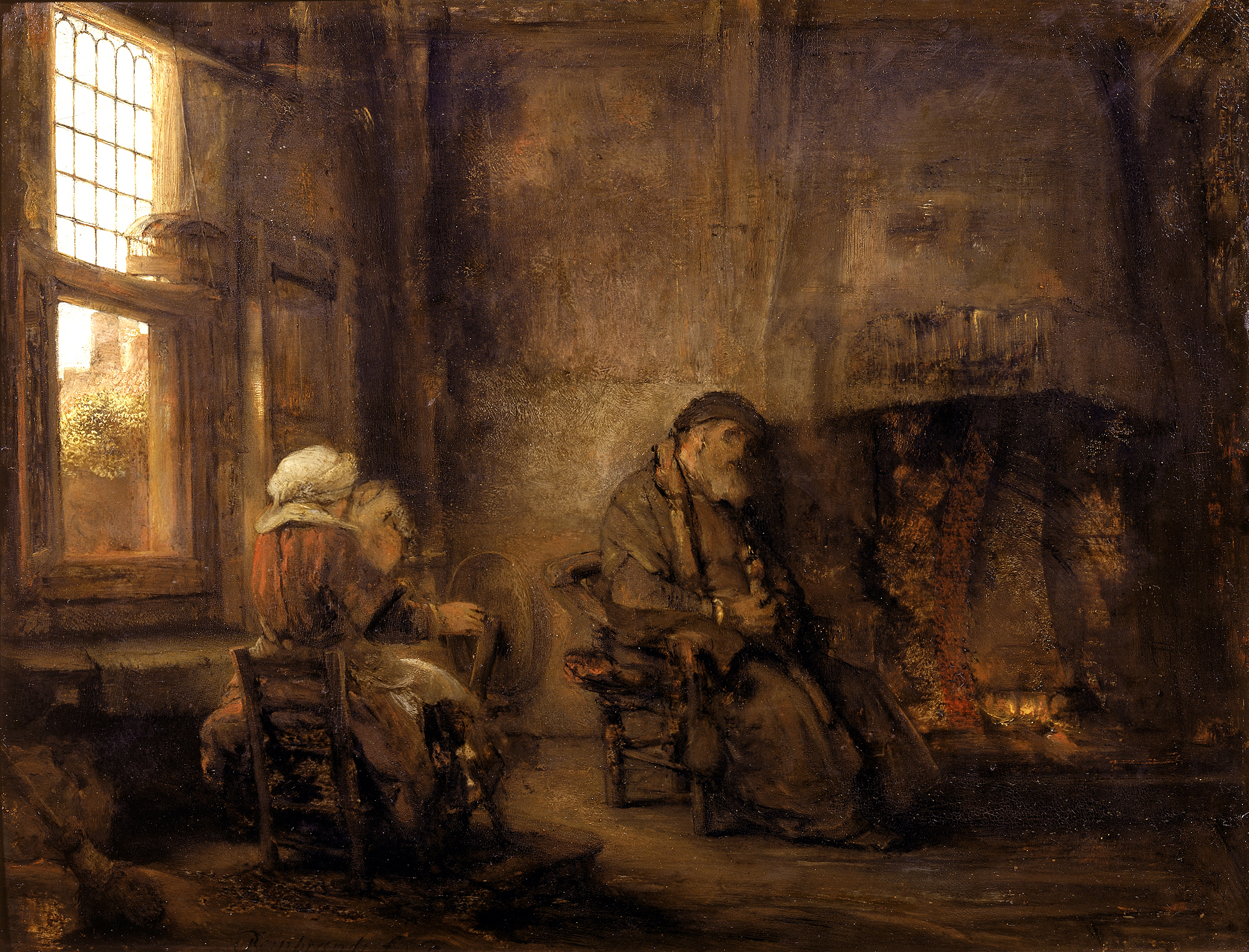
Rembrandt: Tobit and his Wife (Tobit and Anna), 1659

== See also ==
- List of paintings by Rembrandt

== Sources ==
- "Anna and the Blind Tobit". The National Gallery. Retrieved 29 April 2023.
- "Anna and the blind Tobit, ca. 1630". Netherlands Institute for Art History (RKD). Retrieved 29 April 2023.
