= Tobit and Anna with the Kid =

1626 painting by Rembrandt

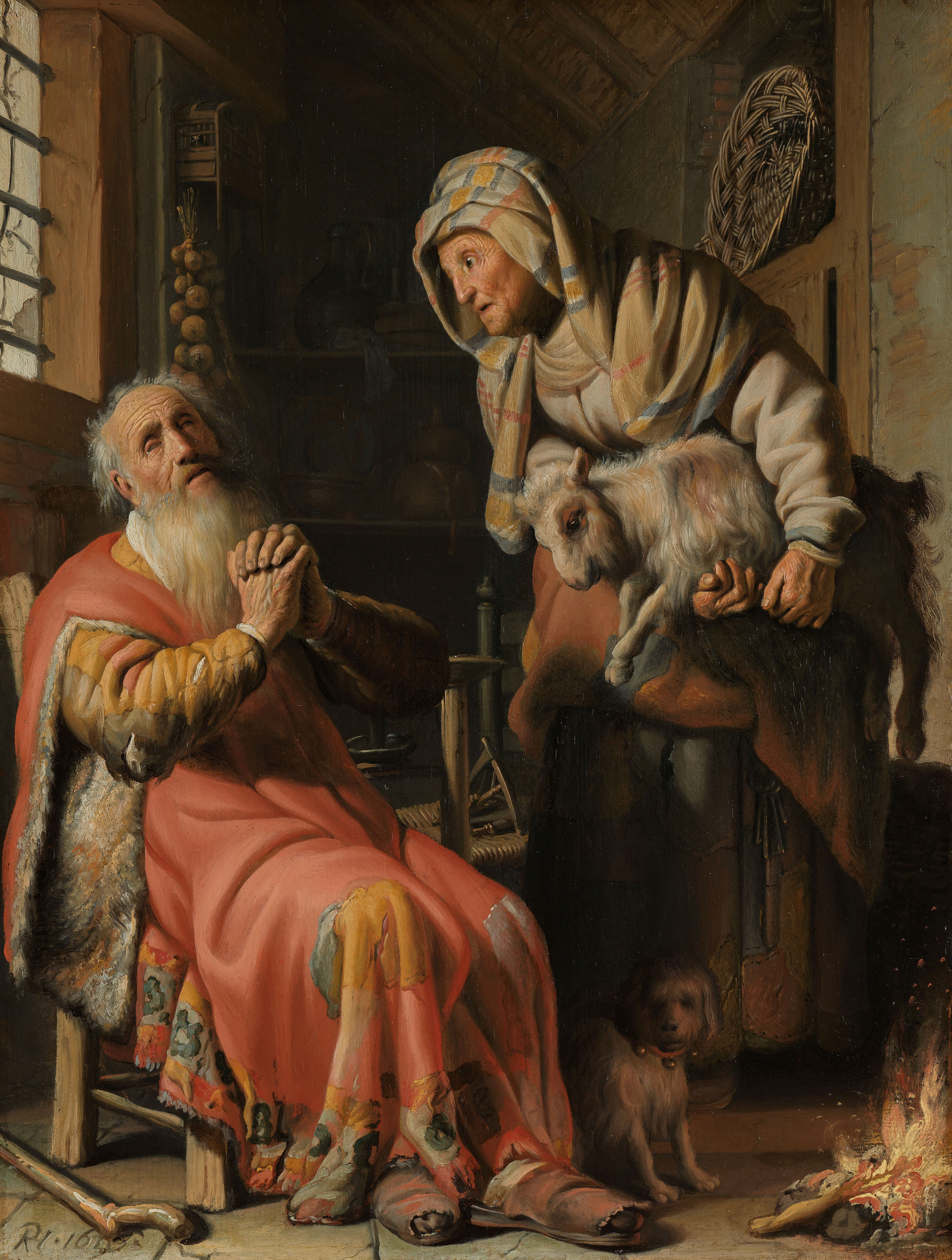
- Artist: Rembrandt
- Year: 1626
- Catalogue: Bredius 486
- Medium: Oil on panel
- Dimensions: 39.5 cm × 30 cm (15.6 in × 12 in)
- Location: Rijksmuseum, Amsterdam
- Accession: SK-A-4717

Tobit and Anna with the Kid, also titled Tobit Accusing Anna of Stealing the Kid, and Tobit Praying for Death, is an early oil painting by the Dutch Golden Age painter Rembrandt, signed and dated 1626. It is now in the Rijksmuseum in Amsterdam.

== Subject ==
The subject of the painting is taken from the deuterocanonical Book of Tobit from the Old Testament.

The painting shows the moment between Tobit and his wife Anna, early in the narrative, when Tobit's faith in his wife's honesty is shaken. Tobit has been blinded in an accident, and to keep the family from poverty Anna works for the neighbours, for whom she makes cloth and sews clothes, and is paid in kind for her work. One day she receives a kid as wages and brings it home. Hearing the young animal's bleating, Tobit fears that his wife has stolen the animal and accuses her of committing a sin. Anna sharply denies the accusations, and Tobit begins to pray to God for death as release from suffering: "that I may be dissolved, and become earth".

In the biblical narrative, the old couple's fortunes are eventually restored by their son, Tobias, with the aid and guidance of the angel Raphael, and Tobit is cured of his blindness by a magic fish caught by Tobias and Raphael in the Tigris.

== Description ==
The painting is signed, at lower left, "RH·1626". This early work by Rembrandt, painted in the year he turned twenty, is described by art historian Gary Schwartz as "his first truly accomplished painting".

Rembrandt skilfully tells the story, focusing on the most important threads: Anna, still with the goat at hand, has just heard her husband's accusation, which she indignantly denies. Tobit is deep in prayer to God, asking for death. At his feet is a small dog, symbolizing Tobit's fidelity and trust in God's justice.

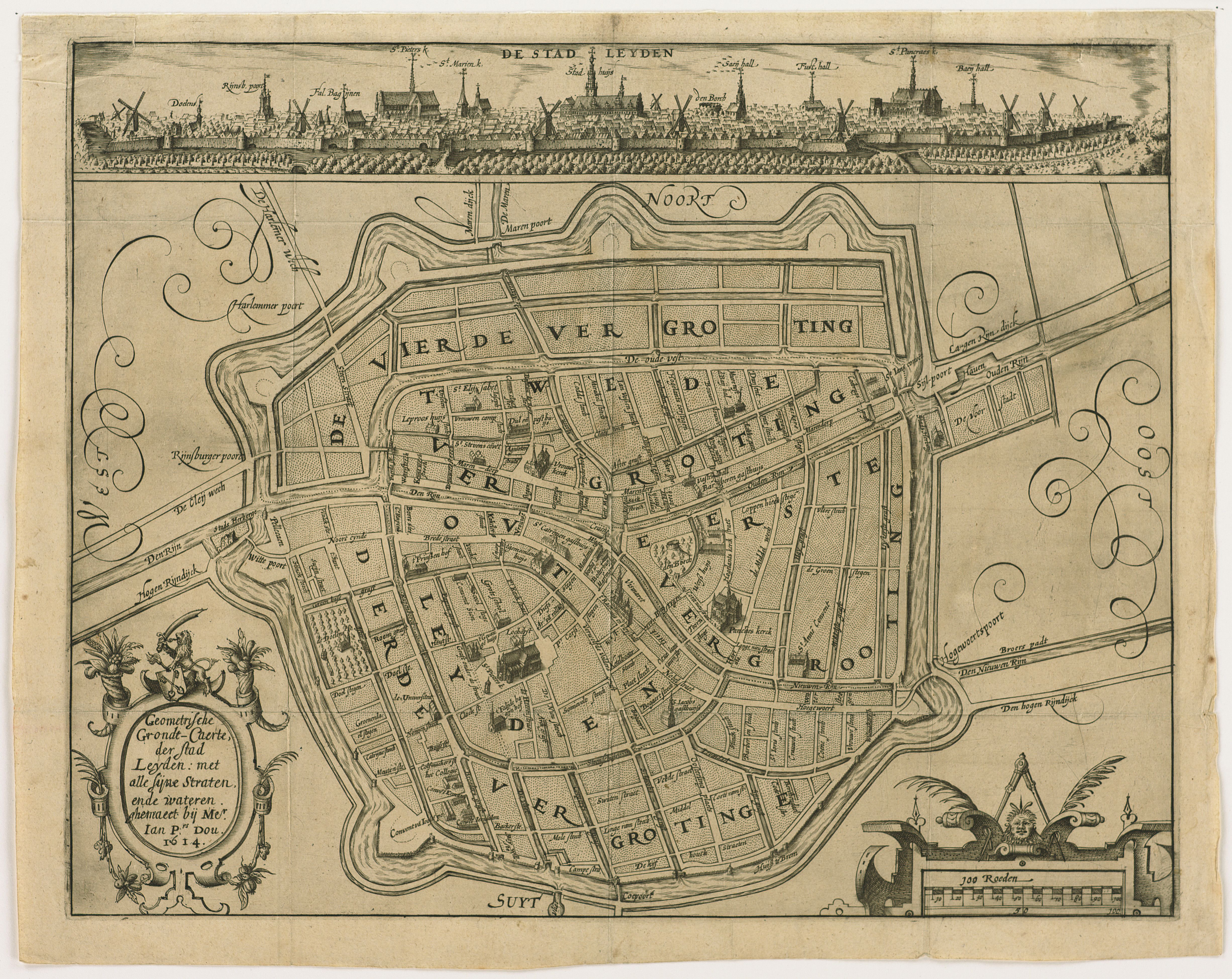
Dutch map of Leyden, 1614

Like most of Rembrandt's first Leyden period, the painting is rich in colour and human emotion. For Michael Kitson, the work is an early and excellent example of Rembrandt's "lifelong fascination with old people". The artist's mother may have posed for the character of Anna.

== Background ==
While the scene of Tobias and the Angel travelling through the desert was already an established subject in European art, Dutch Golden Age painters were also interested in the other episodes of the Book of Tobit. Rembrandt's teacher, Pieter Lastman, had painted a scene from near the end of the story, The Angel Raphael Takes Leave of Old Tobit and his Son Tobias, in which Tobit and Tobias kneel in pious gratitude before the winged Raphael; and Rembrandt himself later painted Raphael's heavenward departure in The Archangel Raphael Leaving Tobias' Family.

== Sources ==
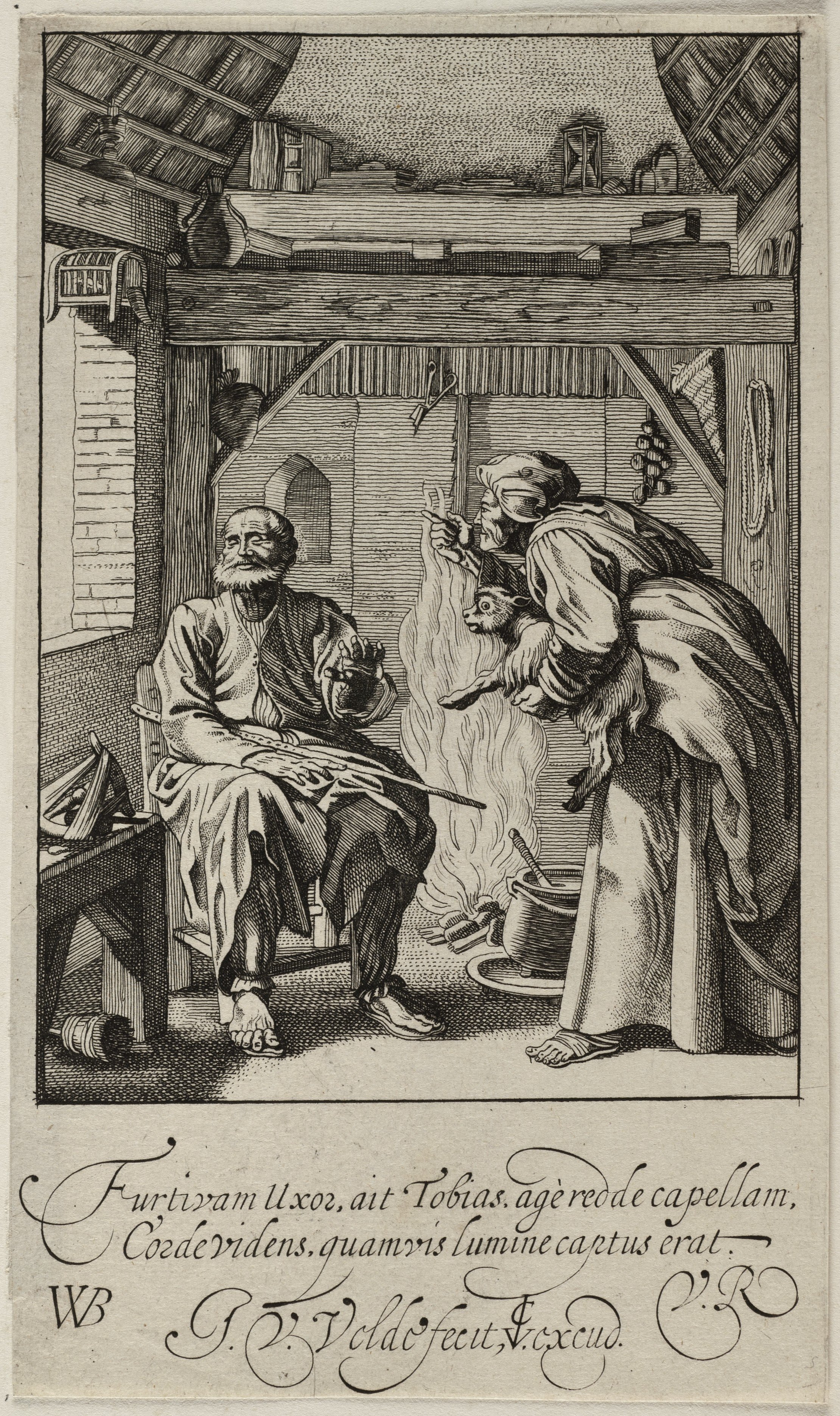
Tobit and Anna with the Goat (Tobit accusing Anna), c. 1620

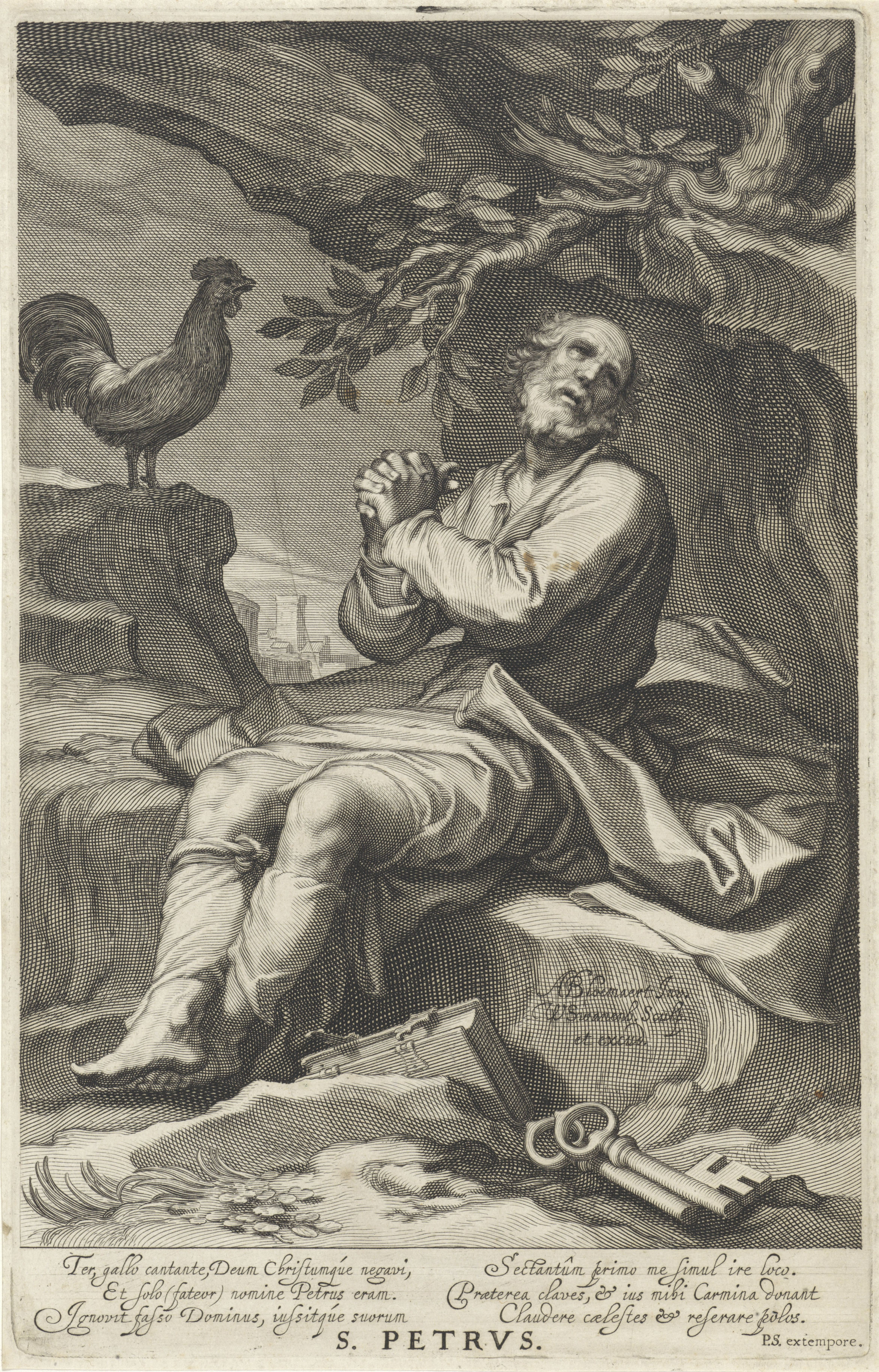
Penitent Saint Peter, c. 1609–1611

In painting the story of Tobit and Anna, Rembrandt relied on an engraving of the same scene by Jan van de Velde, engraved around 1620 after a painting by Willem Buytewech.

Willem van Swanenburg's print of the penitent Saint Peter after a painting by Abraham Bloemaert has also been cited as a source for the figure of Tobit. Indeed, Rembrandt repeatedly copied the work of other artists; he had many of them in his own private collection.

== Provenance ==
The painting was first mentioned on 29 October 1748 in the catalogue of Pieter van Buytene's collection (Oude Koornmarkt, Delft), which was put up for sale. Between 17 and 18 April 1759 it was purchased by Yver at an anonymous sale at an unknown auction house in Amsterdam. From 1905 to 1913 the painting was in the collection of Dmitry Shchukin (Moscow). In 1917, it was sold by the art dealer E. J. Goudstikker (Amsterdam), and it was in the collection of Baron Thyssen-Bornemisza (Schloss Rohoncz, Lugano; Villa Favorita, Castagnola) from 1956 to 1979. In 1979, the painting was acquired by the Rijksmuseum in Amsterdam.

== Related works ==
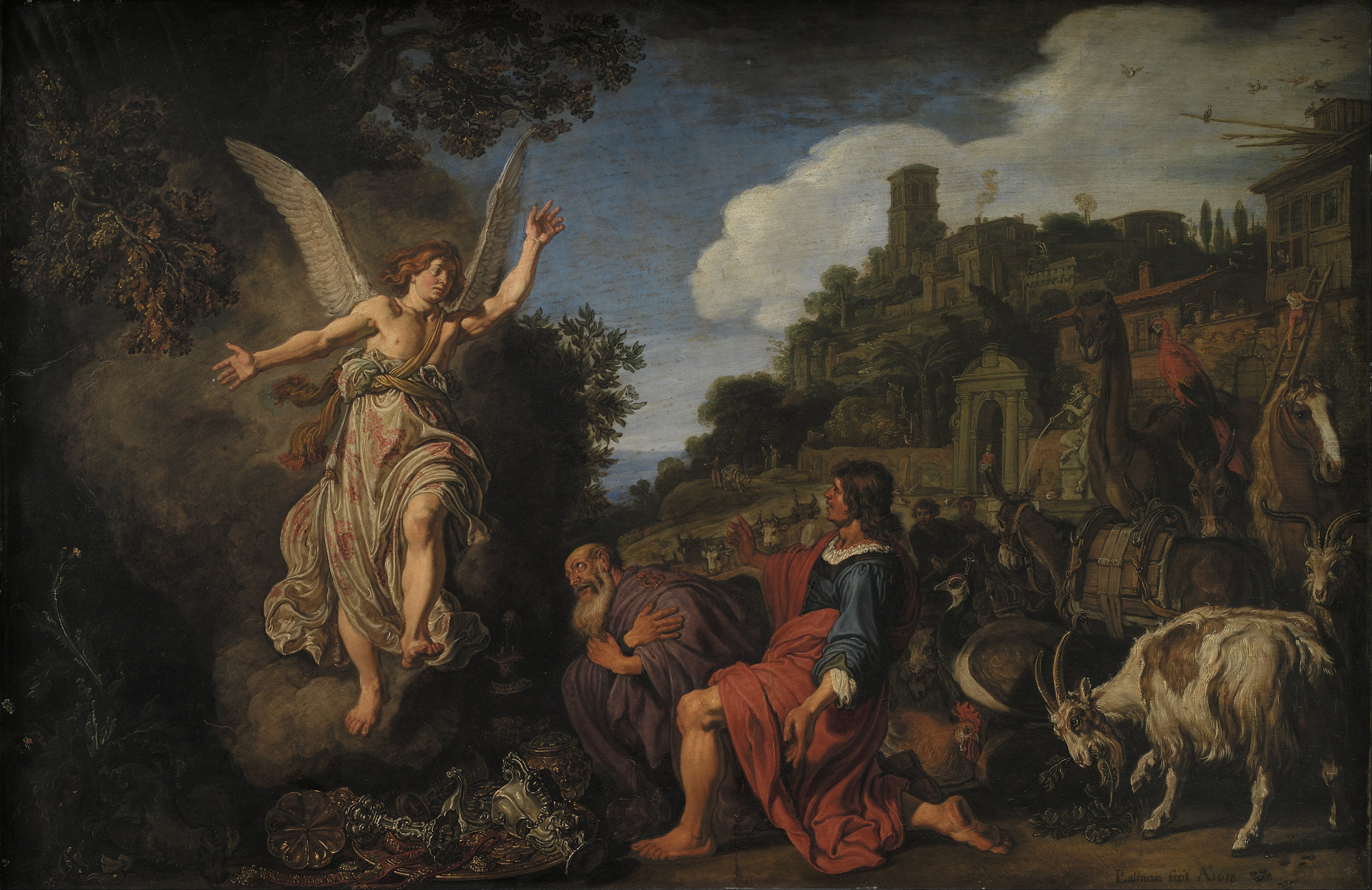
Pieter Lastman: The Angel Raphael Takes Leave of Old Tobit and his Son Tobias, 1618

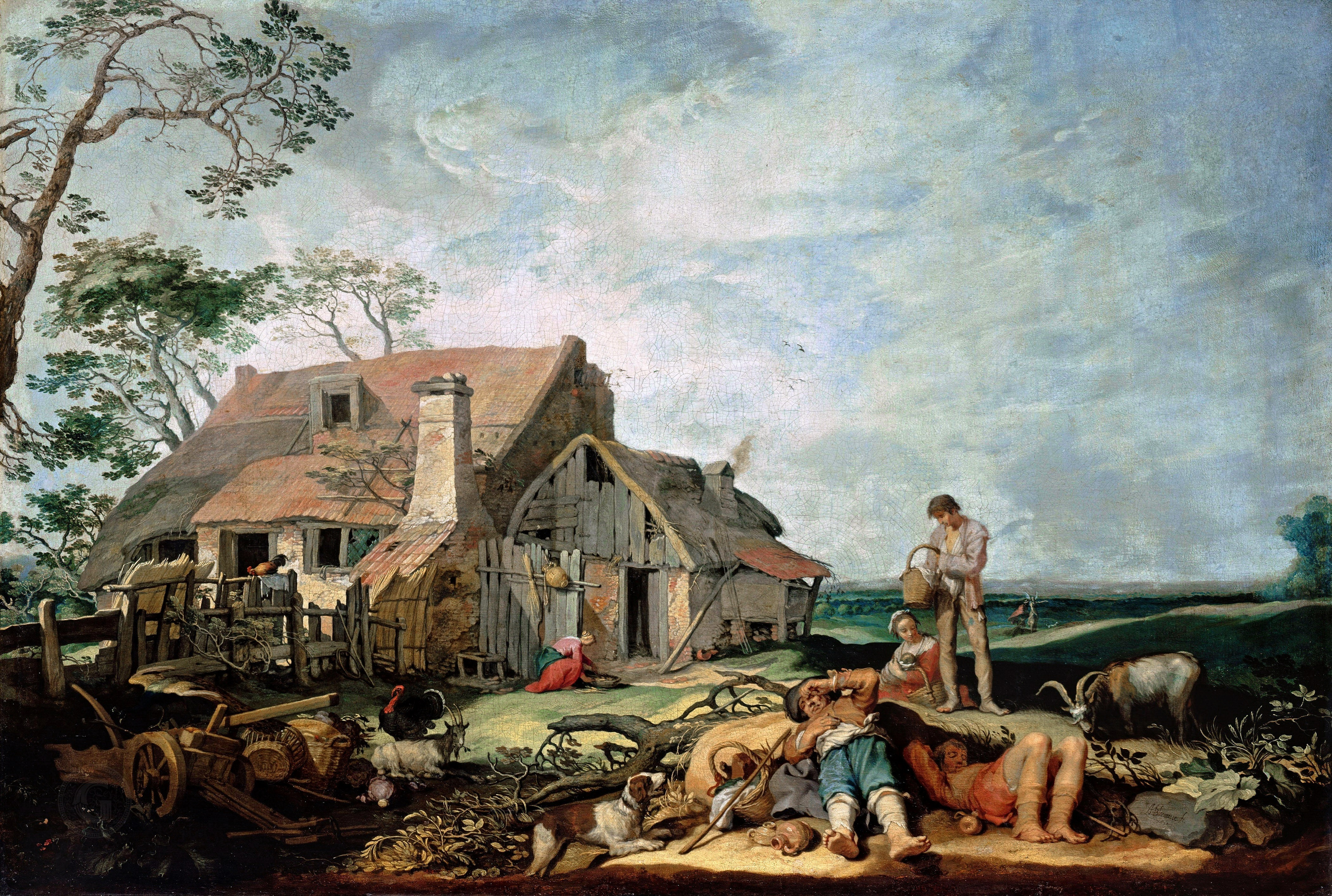
Abraham Bloemaert: Landscape with the Exodus of Tobias and the Angel, 1630

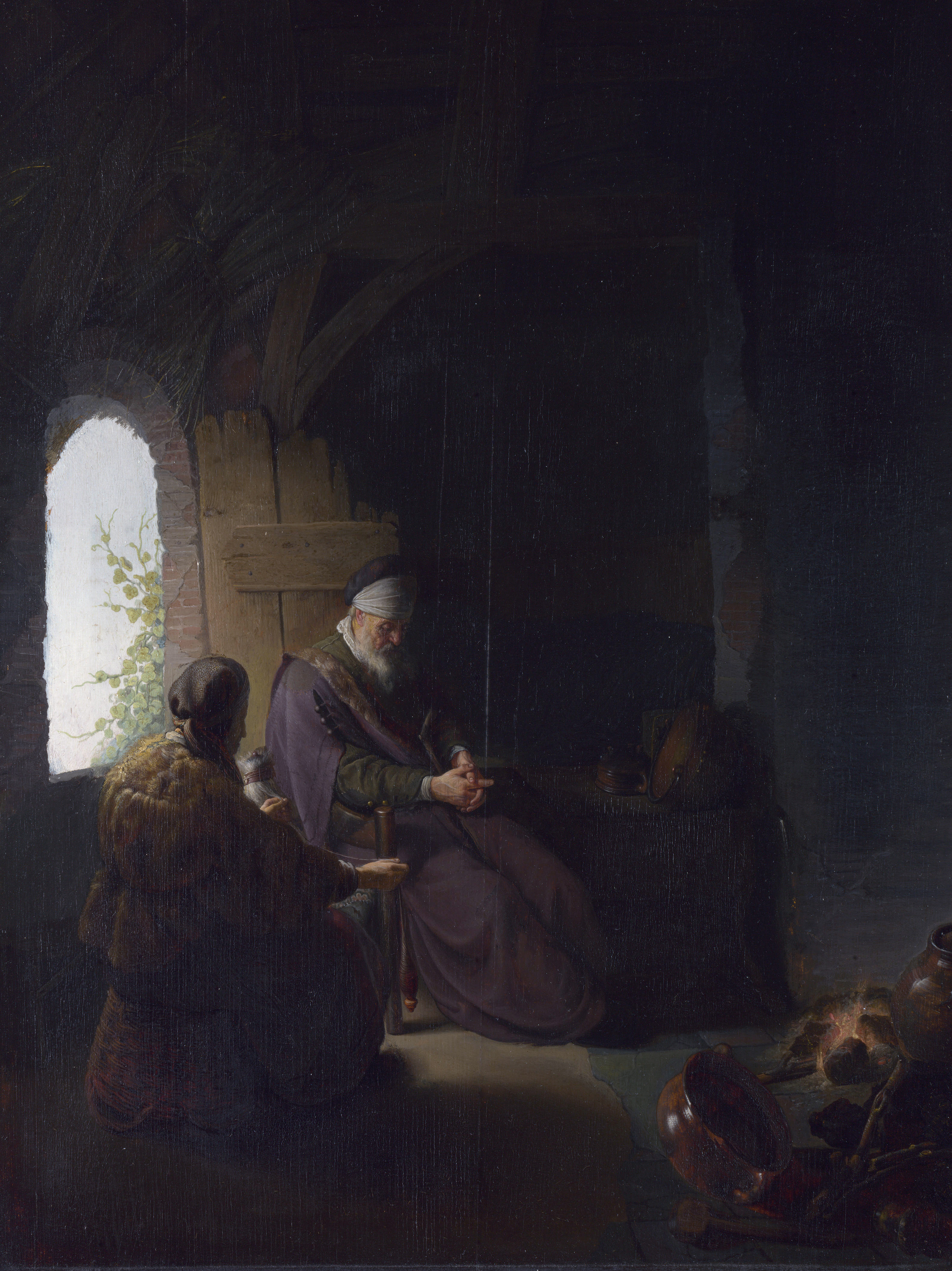
Rembrandt: Anna and the Blind Tobit, c. 1630

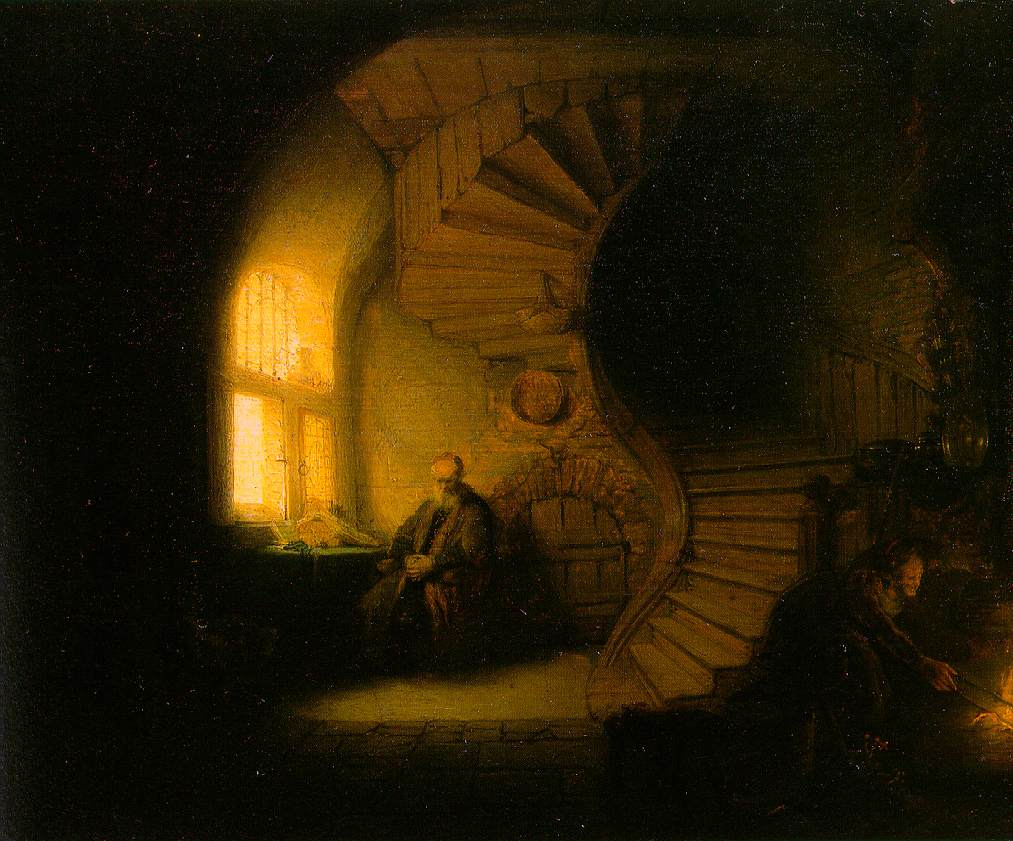
Rembrandt: Philosopher in Meditation, 1632

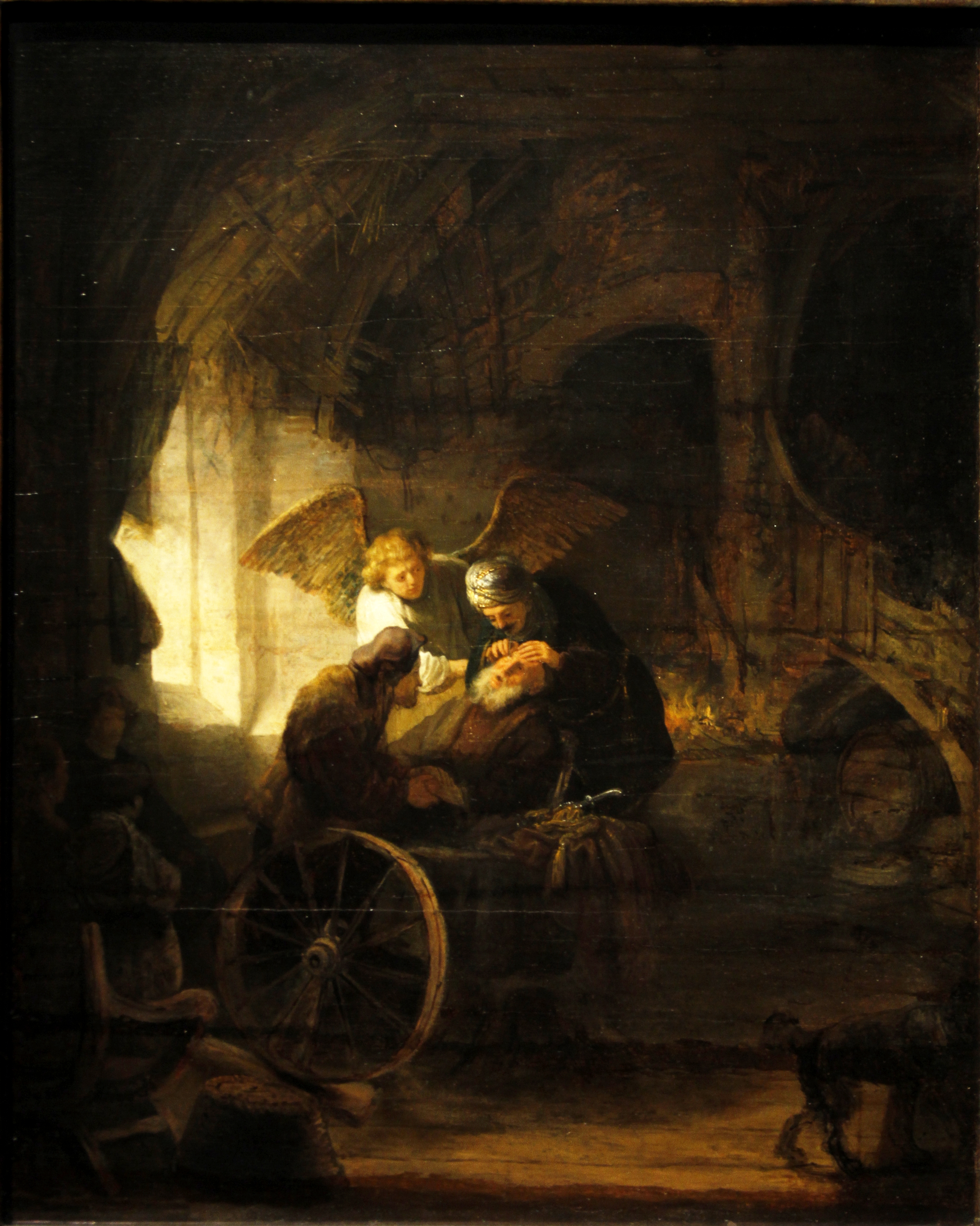
Rembrandt: Tobias Healing his Blind Father, 1636

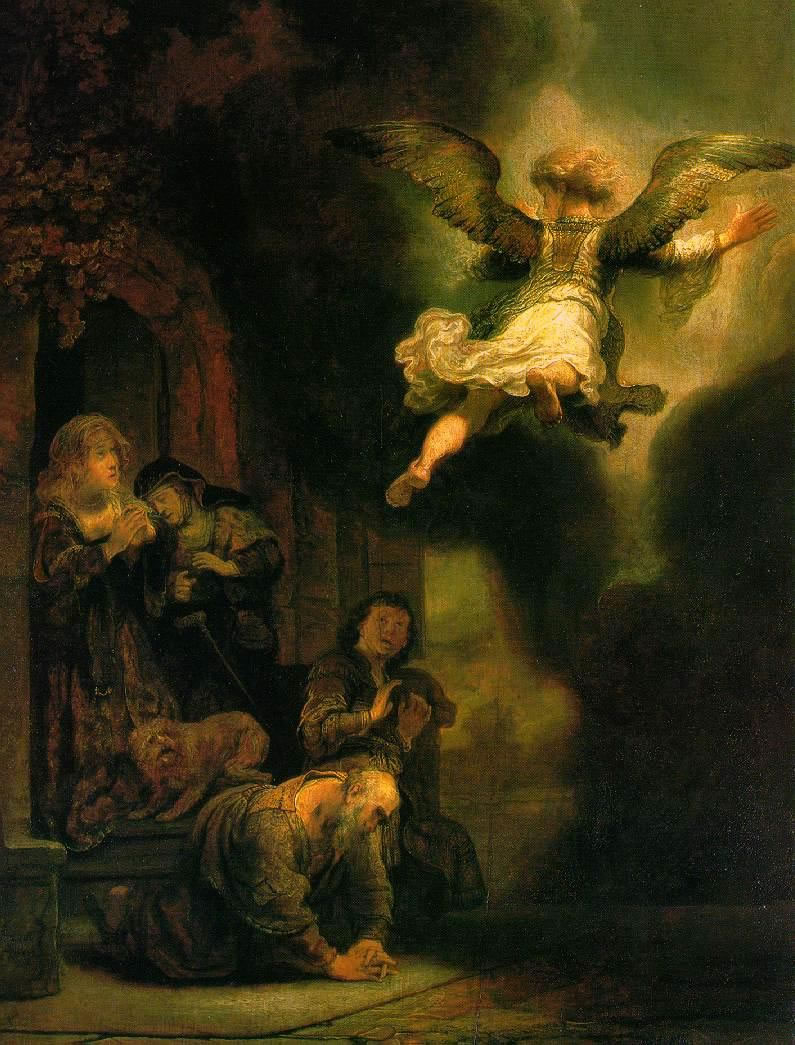
Rembrandt: The Angel Raphael Leaving Tobias' Family, 1637

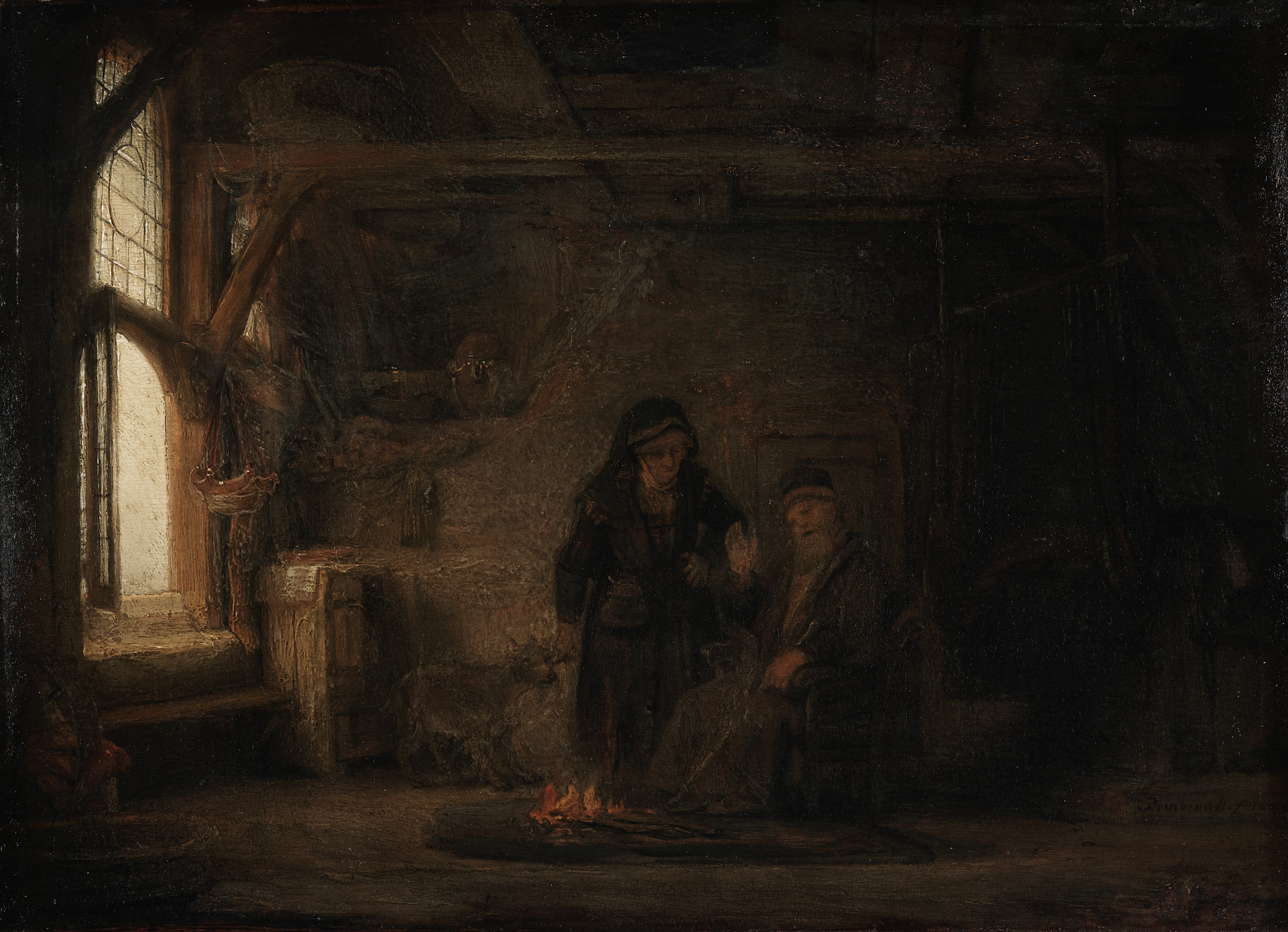
Rembrandt and workshop: Tobit and Anna with the Kid, 1645

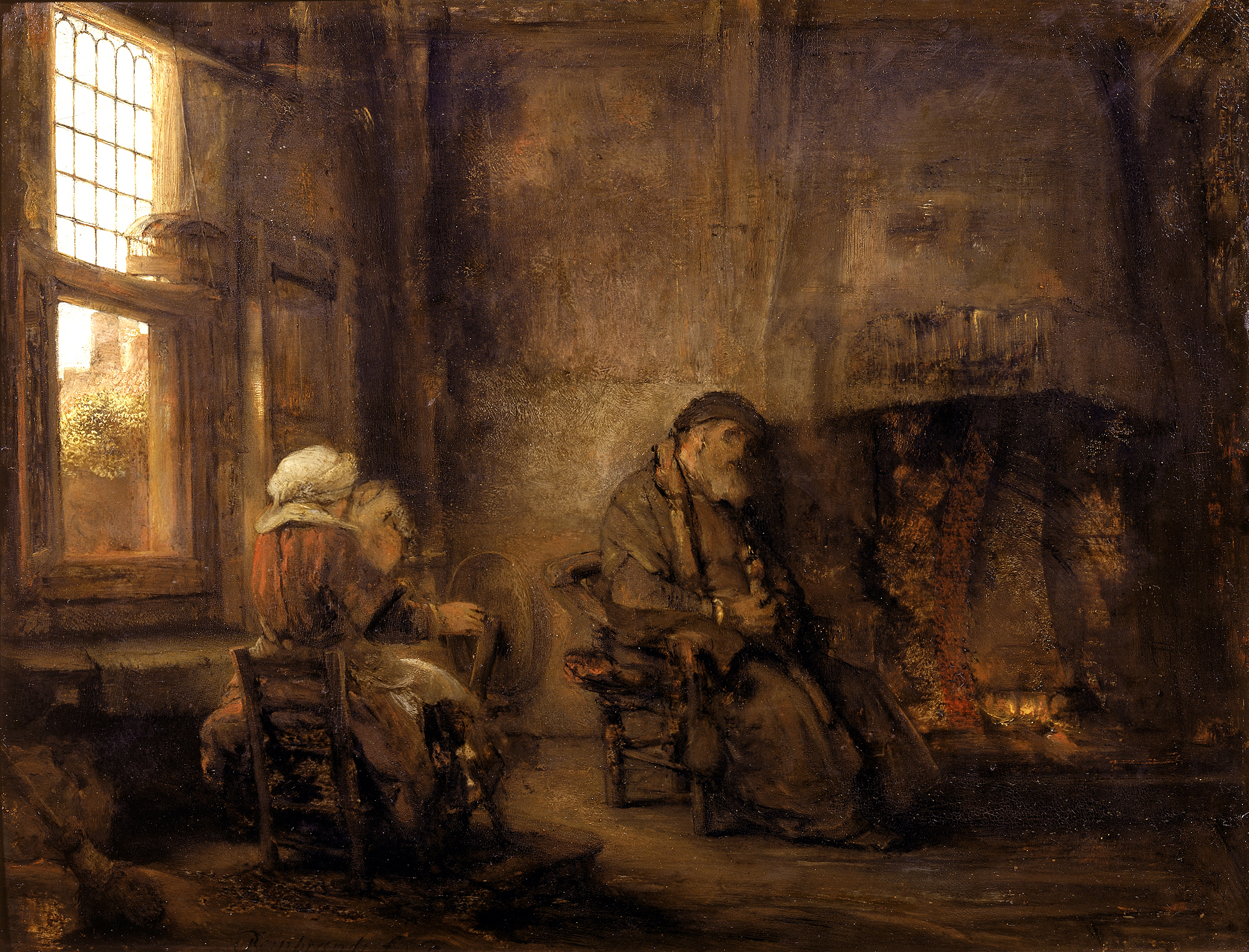
Rembrandt: Tobit and his Wife (Tobit and Anna), 1659

== See also ==
- List of paintings by Rembrandt

== Sources ==
- Kaufman, Elizabeth Elias (1981). Rembrandt. New York: Book Sales. p. 9. ISBN 0-89009-372-5.
- Kitson, Michael (1982). Rembrandt. Oxford: Phaidon Press. pp. 15, 18, plate 1.
- Michałkowa, Janina (1960). Rembrandt. Warsaw: Wiedza Powszechna. p. 21.
- Schwartz, Gary (1985). Rembrandt: His Life, His Paintings. Viking. pp. 44, 47, 52, 230.
- "Tobit and Anna with the Kid, Rembrandt van Rijn, 1626". Rijksmuseum. Retrieved 20 April 2023.
