= The Archangel Raphael Leaving Tobias' Family =

Painting by Rembrandt

- L'Archange Raphaël quittant la famille de Tobie (French)
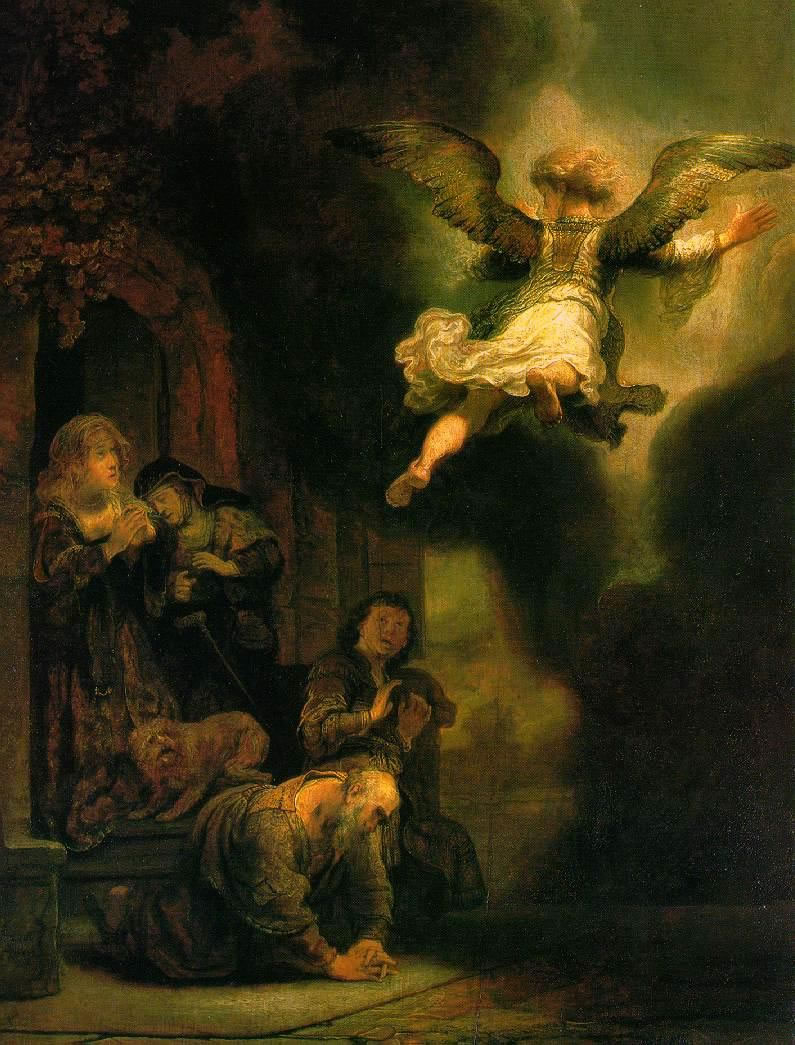
- Artist: Rembrandt
- Year: 1637
- Medium: Oil on panel
- Dimensions: 66 cm × 52 cm (26 in × 20 in)
- Location: Louvre, Paris

The Archangel Raphael Leaving Tobias' Family is a 1637 oil-on-panel painting by Rembrandt, now in the Louvre, in Paris, France. The painting depicts a scene from the Book of Tobit, in which the archangel Raphael departs after guiding Tobias on his journey and helping to cure the blindness of his father, Tobit.

== See also ==
- List of paintings by Rembrandt
