= Authorship of the Bible =

Modern scholarly approaches to biblical authorship and textual composition

The books of the Bible represent the culmination of intricate literary processes spanning multiple generations, with numerous unnamed scribes, compilers, and revisers contributing layers of material over extended periods, contrasting sharply with traditional attributions to singular prophetic or apostolic figures.

Contemporary biblical studies reveals how these texts evolved from communal oral performance through sophisticated scribal workshops of the Second Temple era, subsequently transmitted via manuscript copying networks, transformed by print technology, and refined through modern scholarly editions.

Archaeological discoveries including the Dead Sea Scrolls together with extensive evidence of textual variation across manuscript collections worldwide, provide insight into the complex history of biblical composition and transmission. This evidence suggests that the biblical texts developed through processes of compilation, revision, and transmission, with diverse literary traditions and textual forms contributing to the formation of the biblical books as they were preserved.

== Divine authorship ==
The rabbis of the Babylonian Talmud state in a midrash (homiletical interpretation) that God wrote the Torah in heaven in letters of black fire on parchment of white fire before the world was created, and that Moses received it by divine dictation. The early Church Fathers agreed that the scriptures were inspired or dictated by God, but not on which writings were scriptural: as a result, the Eastern Orthodox and Roman Catholic churches treat some books (the Deuterocanonical books or Apocrypha) as inspired, but the Protestant tradition does not.

In the 20th century, the vast majority of Catholic and Protestant theologians moved away from the divine dictation model and emphasized the role of the human authors. Many conservative scholars now accept, for example, that the Book of Isaiah has multiple authors and that 2 Corinthians is two letters joined. Nevertheless, both Dei Filius, the First Vatican Council's Dogmatic Constitution on the Catholic Faith, and Dei verbum, the Second Vatican Council's Dogmatic Constitution on Divine Revelation, retain the form of wording which states that the scriptures "have God as their author", with the latter text adding that

In composing the sacred books, God chose men and while employed by Him they made use of their powers and abilities, so that with Him acting in them and through them, they, as true authors, consigned to writing everything and only those things which He wanted.

== Hebrew Bible ==
The Hebrew Bible, or Tanakh, is the collection of scriptures making up the Bible used by Judaism. The same books, in a slightly different order, also make up the Protestant version of the Old Testament. The order used here follows the divisions used in Jewish Bibles.

Most of the Hebrew Bible was written between the late 8th century BCE and early 6th century BCE. Biblical texts were written by scribes (Hebrew: sofer), the literate class of bureaucrats in a mostly non-literate, oral culture. The question of biblical authorship was not important until Hellenization in the 4th century BCE, long after most biblical books had been written. Ancient Greeks believed that a text's authority depended on its author, and Jewish tradition was pressured to identify authors for its writings.

=== Torah ===
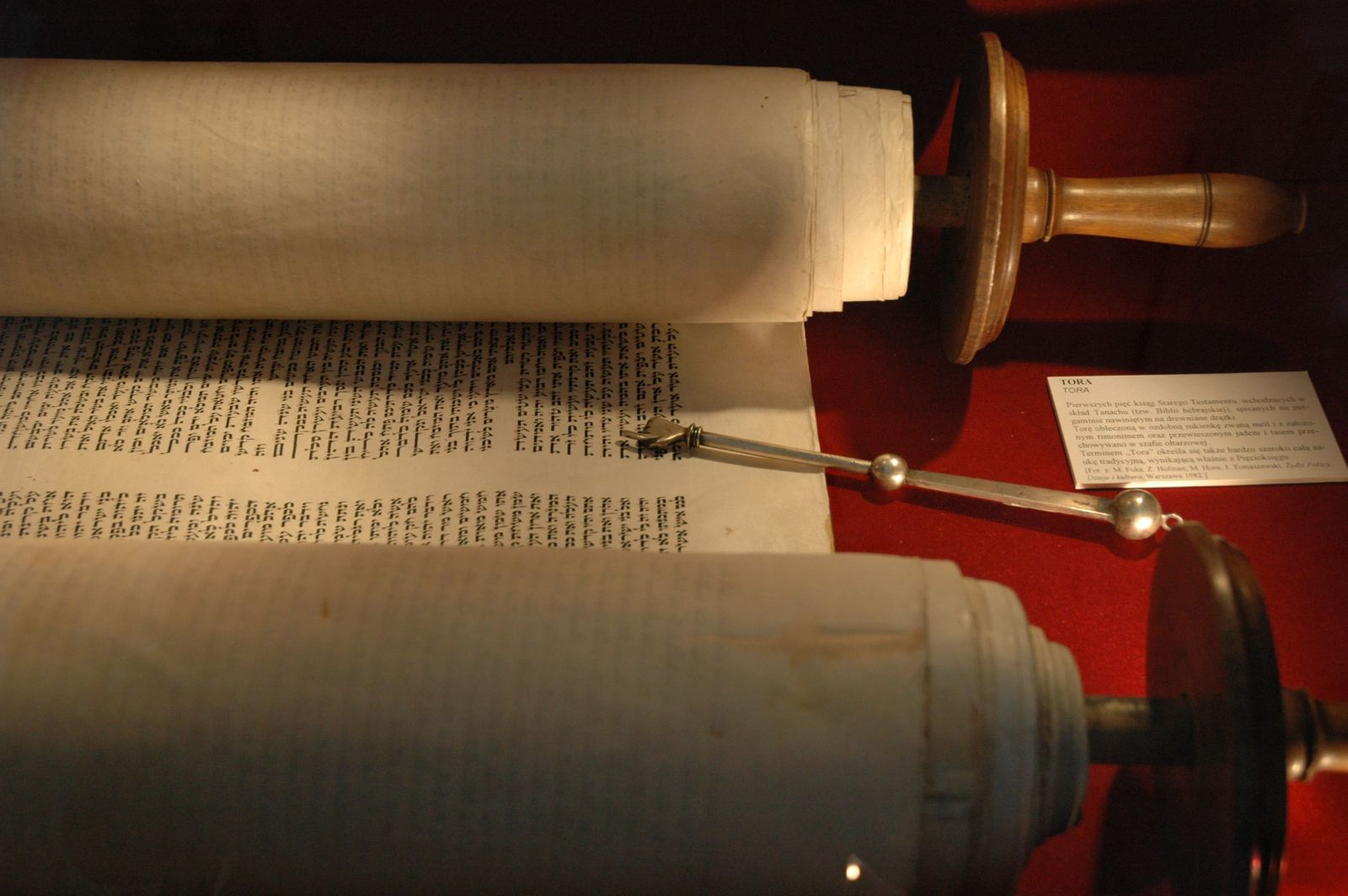
A Sefer Torah

The first division of the Jewish Bible is the Torah, meaning 'Instruction' or 'Law'. In scholarly literature, it is frequently called by its Greek name, the Pentateuch ('five scrolls'). It is the group of five books made up of Genesis, Exodus, Leviticus, Numbers, and Deuteronomy and stands first in all versions of the Christian Old Testament.

In Jewish and Christian tradition authorship of the Torah is attributed to Moses. The Torah itself attributes certain sections to Mosaic authorship. (Note: See Exodus 17:14, 24:4, 34:28; Numbers 33:2; and Deuteronomy 31:9, 31:22.) In later biblical texts, such as Daniel 9:11 and Ezra 3:2, it is called the "Torah of Moses". According to Rabbinic tradition, the five books of the Torah were written by Moses, with the exception of the last eight verses of Deuteronomy which describe his death.

Moses would have lived in the 2nd millennium BCE, before the development of Hebrew writing. Scholars date the Torah to the 1st millennium BCE. The Torah may, however, incorporate older oral traditions, such as proverbs, stories, and songs. Most Jews and Christians believed in Mosaic authorship until the 17th century. Today, the majority of scholars agree that the Pentateuch does not have a single author and that its composition took place over centuries.

==== Genesis, Exodus, Leviticus and Numbers ====
The rise of historical criticism in the 19th century led scholars to conclude that multiple authors wrote the Pentateuch over a long period. By the mid-20th century, the documentary hypothesis had gained nearly universal consensus among scholars. According to the documentary hypothesis, the Pentateuch was created by combining four originally independent documents. The Jahwist source (c. 10th – c. 9th century BCE) and the Elohist source (c. 8th century BCE) were the first to be combined into one document. In the 7th century BCE, the Deuteronomist produced Deuteronomy, which was later added to the combined document. In the post-exilic period, the Pentateuch reached its final form with the addition of the Priestly source (c. 5th century BCE).

The consensus around the documentary hypothesis began to break down in the 1970s, and this approach has since seen various revisions. While the identification of distinctive Deuteronomistic and Priestly theologies and vocabularies remains widespread, they are used to form new approaches suggesting that the books were combined gradually over time by the slow accumulation of "fragments" of text, or that a basic text was "supplemented" by later authors/editors. At the same time there has been a tendency to bring the origins of the Pentateuch further forward in time, and the most recent proposals place it in 5th century BCE Judah under the Persian empire.

==== Deuteronomy ====
Deuteronomy is treated separately from Genesis, Exodus, Leviticus and Numbers. Its place in the documentary hypothesis is anomalous, as it, unlike the other four, consists of a single "source". The process of its formation probably took several hundred years, from the 8th century to the 6th, and its authors have been variously identified as prophetic circles (because the concerns of Deuteronomy mirror those of the prophets, especially Hosea), Levitical priestly circles (because it stresses the role of the Levites), and wisdom and scribal circles (because it esteems wisdom, and because the treaty-form in which it is written would be best known to scribes). Deuteronomy was later used as the introduction to the comprehensive history of Israel written in the early part of the 6th century, and later still it was detached from the history and used to round off the Pentateuch.

=== Prophets ===
==== Former prophets ====
The Former Prophets (נביאים ראשונים, Nevi'im Rishonim), make up the first part of the second division of the Hebrew Bible, the Nevi'im, which translates as "Prophets". In Christian Bibles the Book of Ruth, which belongs in the final section of the Hebrew Bible, is inserted between Judges and Samuel.

According to Jewish tradition dating from at least the 2nd century CE, the Book of Joshua was by Joshua, the Book of Judges and the Books of Samuel were by the prophet Samuel (with some passages by the prophets Gad and Nathan), while the two Books of Kings were by Jeremiah. Since 1943 most scholars have accepted Martin Noth's argument that Deuteronomy, Joshua, Judges, Samuel and Kings make up a single work, the so-called "Deuteronomistic history". Noth believed that the history was the work of a single author writing in the time of the Babylonian exile (586–539 BCE). This author/editor took as his starting point an early version of the book of Deuteronomy, which had already been composed during the reign of Josiah (last quarter of the 7th century), selecting, editing and composing it to produce a coherent work. Frank Moore Cross later proposed that an earlier version of the history was composed in Jerusalem in Josiah's time; this first version, Dtr1, was then revised and expanded to create Noth's second edition, or Dtr2. Still later scholars have discovered further layers and further author-editors. In the 1990s some scholars began to question the existence of a Deuteronomistic history and the question of the origin of these books continues to be debated.

==== Latter prophets ====
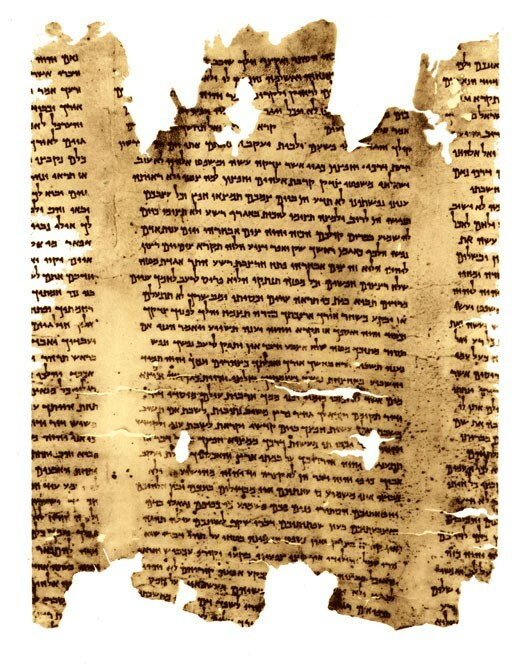
A fragment of the Book of Isaiah found among the Dead Sea Scrolls

===== Isaiah =====
Modern scholars divide the Book of Isaiah into three parts, each with a different origin: "First Isaiah", chapters 1–39, containing the words of the historical 8th century BCE prophet Isaiah and later expansions by his disciples; "Deutero-Isaiah" (chapters 40–55), by an anonymous Jewish author in Babylon near the end of the Babylonian captivity; and "Trito-Isaiah" (chapters 56–66), by anonymous disciples of Deutero-Isaiah in Jerusalem immediately after the return from Babylon (although some scholars suggest that chapters 55–66 were written by Deutero-Isaiah after the fall of Babylon). This orderly sequence of pre-exilic, exilic and post-exilic material is somewhat misleading, as some scholars note that significant editing appears to have taken place in all three parts.

===== Jeremiah =====
Jeremiah lived in the late 7th and early 6th centuries BCE. The Book of Jeremiah presents Baruch ben Neriah as the prophet's companion who writes his words on several occasions, and there has accordingly been much speculation that Baruch could have composed an early edition of the book. In the early 20th century Sigmund Mowinckel identified three types of material in the book, Jeremiah 1–25 (Type A) being the words of Jeremiah himself, the biographic prose material (Type B) by an admirer writing c. 580–480 BCE, and the remainder (Type C) from later periods. There has been considerable debate over Mowinckel's ideas, notably the extent of the Jeremiah material and the role of Baruch, who may have been the author of the Type B material. It is generally agreed that the book has strong connections with the Deuteronomistic layers from the Former Prophets, recapitulating in modern terms the traditional idea that Jeremiah wrote both his own book and the Books of Kings.

===== Ezekiel =====
The Book of Ezekiel describes itself as the words of Ezekiel ben-Buzi, a priest living in exile in the city of Babylon between 593 and 571 BCE. The various manuscripts, however, differ markedly from each other, and it is clear that the book has been subjected to extensive editing. While Ezekiel himself may have been responsible for some of this revision, there is general agreement that the book as we have it today is the product of a highly educated priestly circle that owed allegiance to the historical Ezekiel and was closely associated with the Temple.

===== Minor Prophets or Book of the Twelve =====
The Minor Prophets are one book in the Hebrew Bible, and many (though not all) modern scholars agree that the Book of the Twelve underwent a process of editing which resulted in a coherent collection. This process is believed to have reached its final form in the Persian period (538–332 BCE), although there is disagreement over whether this was early or late. For the individual books, scholars usually assume that there exists an original core of prophetic tradition which can be attributed to the figure after whom the book is named. The noteworthy exception is the Book of Jonah, an anonymous work containing no prophetic oracles, probably composed in the Hellenistic period (332–167 BCE).

=== Writings ===
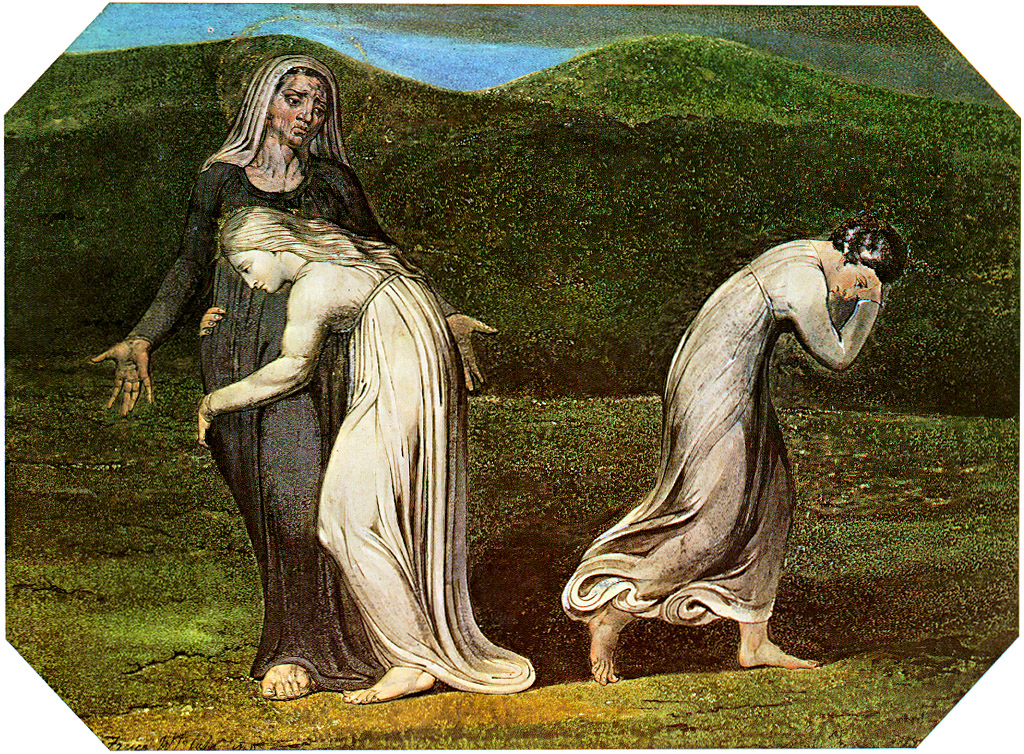
Naomi entreating Ruth and Orpah to return to the land of Moab by William Blake, 1795

==== Psalms ====
While a number of the Psalms bear headings which seem to identify their authors, these are probably the result of the need to find a significant identification in tradition. The individual psalms come from widely different periods: "some ... presuppose a reigning king and an established cult in the Temple; others clearly presuppose and mention the events of the Exile."

==== Job ====
The unknown author of the Book of Job is unlikely to have written earlier than the 6th century BCE, and the cumulative evidence suggests a post-Exilic date. It contains some 1,000 lines, of which about 750 form the original core.

==== Proverbs ====
The Book of Proverbs consists of several collections taken from various sources. Chapters 10:1–22:16 are probably the oldest section, with chapters 1–9 being composed as a prologue – there is some question whether this happened before or after the Exile (587 BCE). The remaining collections are probably later, with the book reaching its final form around the 3rd century BCE.

==== Ruth ====
The Talmud refers to Samuel as the author of Ruth, but this conflicts with several details inside the book. It has been proposed that the anonymous author was a woman, or if a man then one who took women's issues seriously. The book is largely a unity, although the genealogy of David appears to be a later addition.

==== Song of Songs (Song of Solomon) ====
The Song of Songs was traditionally attributed to Solomon, but modern scholars date it around the 3rd century BCE. Scholars still debate whether it is a single unified work (and therefore from a single author), or more in the nature of an anthology.

==== Qoheleth/Ecclesiastes ====
The Book of Ecclesiastes is usually dated to the mid-3rd century BCE. A provenance in Jerusalem is considered likely. The book's claim of Solomon as author is a literary fiction; the author also identifies himself as "Qoheleth", a word of obscure meaning which critics have understood variously as a personal name, a nom de plume, an acronym, and a function; a final self-identification is as "shepherd", a title usually implying royalty.

==== Lamentations ====
Lamentations is assigned by tradition to the Prophet Jeremiah; linguistic and theological evidence point to its origin as a distinct book in the 3rd or 2nd century BCE, with the contents having their origin in special mourning observances in Exilic and post-Exilic Jewish communities.

==== Esther ====
The Book of Esther was composed in the late 4th or early 3rd century BCE among the Jews of the eastern diaspora. The genre of the book is the novella or short story, and it draws on the themes of wisdom literature; its sources are still unresolved.

==== Daniel ====
The Book of Daniel presents itself as the work of a prophet named Daniel who lived during the 6th century BCE; the overwhelming majority of modern scholars date it to the 2nd century BCE. The author, writing in the time of the Maccabees to assure his fellow-Jews that their persecution by the Syrians would come to an end and see them victorious, seems to have constructed his book around the legendary Daniel mentioned in Ezekiel, a figure ranked with Noah and Job for his wisdom and righteousness.

==== Ezra–Nehemiah ====
The Book of Ezra and the Book of Nehemiah were originally one work, Ezra–Nehemiah. H.G.M Williamson (1987) proposed three basic stages leading to the final work: (1) composition of the various lists and Persian documents, which he accepts as authentic and therefore the earliest parts of the book; (2) composition of the "Ezra memoir" and "Nehemiah memoir", about 400 BCE; and (3) composition of Ezra 1–6 as the final editor's introduction to the combined earlier texts, about 300 BCE. Lester Grabbe (2003) puts the combination of the two texts Ezra and Nehemiah, with some final editing, somewhat later, in the Ptolemaic period, c. 300–200 BCE. Israel Finkelstein has argued that the core of Ezra–Nehemiah probably dates to the Persian period but was very likely augmented in the Hasmonean era (2nd–1st centuries BCE).

==== Chronicles ====
Chronicles is an anonymous work from Levitical circles in Jerusalem, probably composed in the late 4th century BCE. Although the book is divided into two parts (1st and 2nd Chronicles), the majority of studies propose a single underlying text with lengthy later additions and amendments to underline certain interests such as the cult or the priesthood.

== Deuterocanonicals/Biblical apocrypha ==
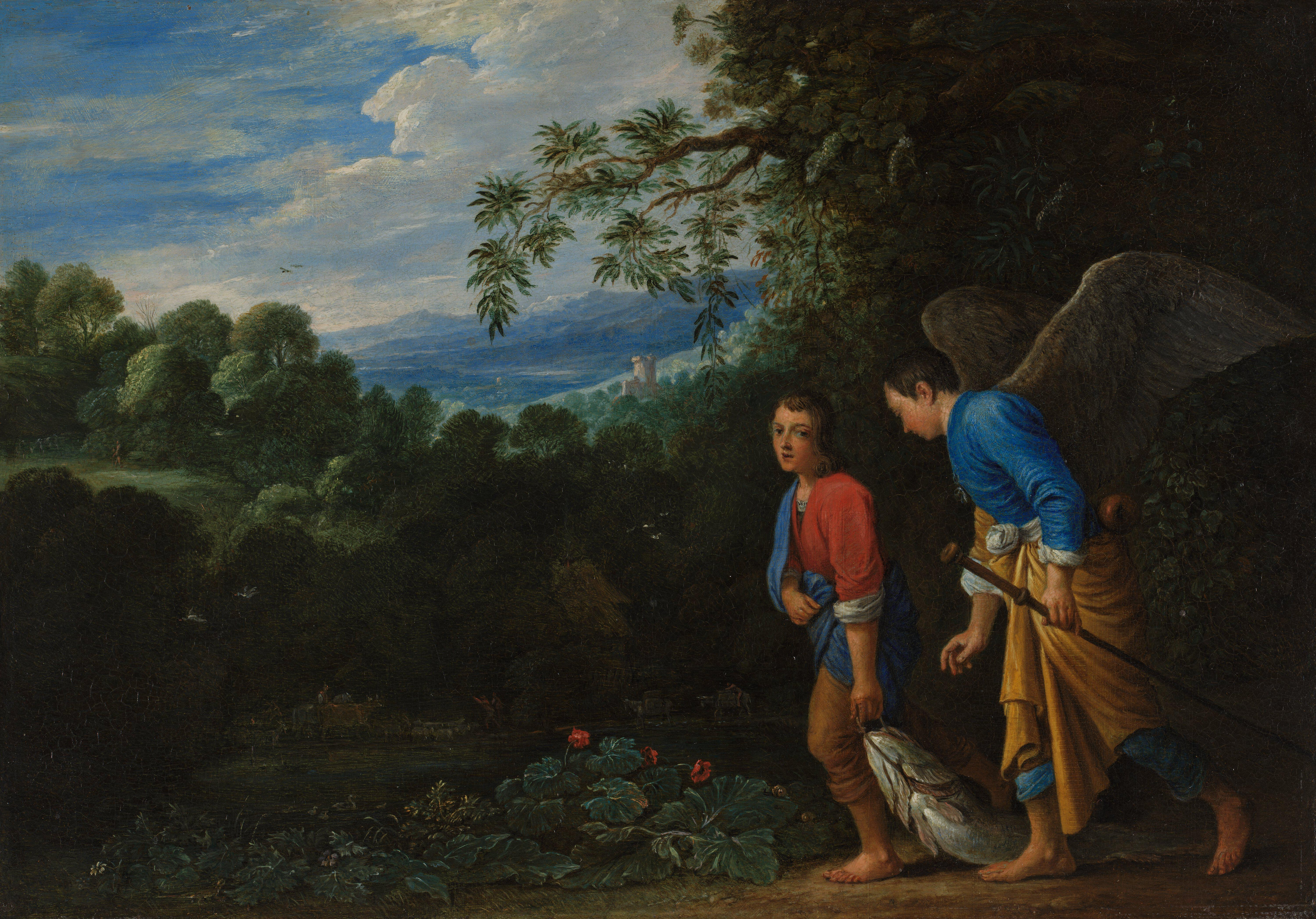
Tobias, Raphael and the fish (Pieter Lastman: illustration to the Book of Tobias)

The Catholic and Orthodox Christian churches include some or all of the following books in their Bibles.

=== Additions to Daniel ===
The Greek text of the Book of Daniel contains additions not found in the Hebrew/Aramaic version. All are anonymous. The Prayer of Azariah (one of Daniel's companions) was probably composed around 169/8–165/4, when Antiochus IV was oppressing the Jews. The Song of the Three Holy Children (i.e., the three thrown into the furnace) may have been composed by priestly circles in Jerusalem. Susanna may have been composed around 170–130 BCE in the context of the Hellenisation struggle. Bel and the Dragon is difficult to date, but the late 6th century BCE is possible.

=== 1 & 2 Esdras ===
Jerome's translation of the Bible into Latin (the Vulgate) contained four books of Esdras (i.e. Ezra); Jerome's 1 and 2 Esdras were eventually renamed Ezra and Nehemiah; the remaining books each moved up two places in most versions, but the numbering system remains highly confused. The present 1 Esdras takes material from the Book of Chronicles and the Book of Ezra, but ignores Nehemiah entirely; it was probably composed in the period 200–100 BCE. 2 Esdras has no connection with the other Esdras books beyond taking Ezra as its central character. It was probably written soon after the destruction of the Temple by the Romans in 70 CE.

=== Book of Baruch ===
The author of the Book of Baruch is traditionally held to be Baruch the companion of Jeremiah, but this is considered unlikely. Some scholars propose that it was written during or shortly after the period of the Maccabees.

=== 1, 2, 3, and 4 Maccabees ===
The anonymous author of 1 Maccabees was an educated Jew and a serious historian; a date around 100 BCE is most likely. 2 Maccabees is a revised and condensed version of a work by an otherwise unknown author called Jason of Cyrene, plus passages by the anonymous editor who made the condensation (called "the Epitomist"). Jason most probably wrote in the mid to late 2nd century BCE, and the Epitomist before 63 BCE. 3 Maccabees concerns itself with the Jewish community in Egypt a half-century before the revolt, suggesting that the author was an Egyptian Jew, and probably a native of Alexandria. A date of c. 100–75 BCE is "very probable". 4 Maccabees was probably composed in the middle half of the 1st century CE, by a Jew living in Syria or Asia Minor.

=== Letter of Jeremiah ===
The Letter of Jeremiah is not by Jeremiah; the author apparently appropriated the name of the prophet to lend authority to his composition. Nor is it by Jeremiah's secretary Baruch, although it appears as the last chapter of Baruch in the Catholic Bible and the KJV. Internal evidence points to a date around 317 BCE, with the author possibly a Jew in Palestine addressing Jews of the diaspora.

=== Prayer of Manasseh ===
The Prayer of Manasseh presents itself as a prayer from the wicked, but now penitent, king Manasseh (or Manassas) from his exile in Babylon. The actual author is unknown, and the date of composition is probably the 2nd or 1st centuries BCE.

=== Sirach and Wisdom of Solomon ===
Sirach names its author as Joshua ben Sirach. He was probably a scribe, offering instruction to the youth of Jerusalem. His grandson's preface to the Greek translation helps date the work to the first quarter of the 2nd century BCE, probably between 196 BCE and the beginning of the oppression of the Jews by Antiochus IV, who reigned 175–164 BCE. The Wisdom of Solomon is unlikely to be earlier than the 2nd century BCE, and probably dates from 100 to 50 BCE. Its self-attribution to Solomon was questioned even in the medieval period, and it shows affinities with the Egyptian Jewish community and with Pharisee teachings.

=== Additions to Esther ===
The Book of Esther itself was composed probably around 400 BCE by Jews living in the eastern provinces of the Persian empire and reached its final form by the 2nd century BCE; concerns over the legitimacy of certain passages in the Hebrew text led to the identification of the additions to Esther in the Greek translation of Esther of the late 2nd or early 1st century BCE.

=== Tobit ===
Tobit is set in the 8th century BCE and is named after its central character, a pious Jew in exile. The generally recognised date of composition is the early 2nd century BCE.

=== Judith ===
The Book of Judith is set in Israel in the time of Nebuchadrezzar, king of Assyria. It has strong Persian elements, which suggests a 4th-century BCE date; it also has strong parallels with the Hasmonean period, which suggests a 2nd-century date. It is typically labeled Pharisaic, but an origin in Sadducee circles has also been suggested.

=== Additional Psalms ===
The canonical Psalms contains 150 entries. Psalm 151 is found in most Greek translations, and the Hebrew version was found among the Dead Sea Scrolls. Psalms 152–155 are part of the Syriac Peshitta Bible, some of which were found at Qumran.

== New Testament ==
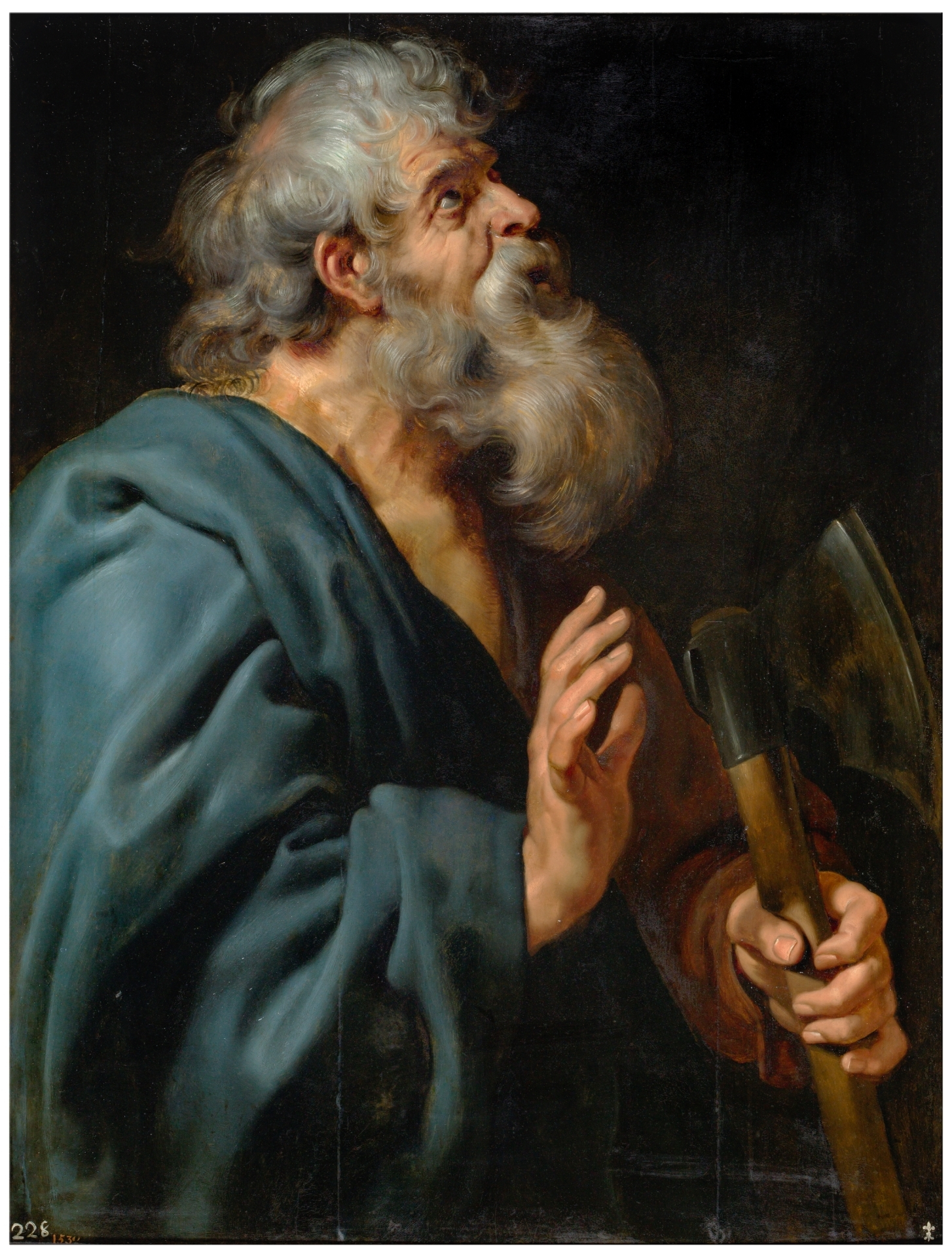
De evangelist Matteüs by Rubens

=== Gospels and Acts ===
The gospels (and Acts) are anonymous, in that none of them provide the name of the author within their text. John might be considered something of an exception, because the author is referred to as "the disciple Jesus loved", a member of Jesus' inner circle.

Many scholars argue that the Gospels were written by anonymous figures rather than the disciples traditionally associated with them. Justin Martyr in his First Apology explicitly refers to the apostles as "uneducated" or "illiterate" (Acts 4:13), which has led scholars to question their ability to write the sophisticated Greek texts of the New Testament. Bart Ehrman, a leading New Testament scholar, supports this view, explaining that the socio-economic background of Jesus' disciples—many of whom were fishermen or peasants—makes it unlikely that they could have authored these works. Ehrman also notes that literacy rates in first-century Palestine were extremely low, particularly in rural areas like Galilee, where most of the disciples lived. This is further supported by Catherine Hezser's research on Jewish literacy in Roman Palestine, which highlights the rarity of literacy among common people during this period. Therefore, it is widely accepted among scholars that the Gospels were likely written by anonymous authors rather than the disciples themselves.

There is general agreement among scholars that the Synoptic Gospels (Matthew, Mark and Luke) show a high level of cross-reference. The most common explanation, the two-source hypothesis, is that Mark was written first and that the authors of Matthew and Luke relied on Mark and the hypothetical Q source, though hypotheses that posit use of Matthew by Luke or vice versa without Q are increasing in popularity. Scholars agree that the Gospel of John was written last, using a different tradition and body of testimony. In addition, most scholars agree that the author of Luke also wrote the Acts of the Apostles, making Luke–Acts two halves of a single work.

==== Mark ====
According to tradition and early church fathers, first attested by Papias of Hierapolis, the author is Mark the Evangelist, the companion of the apostle Peter. Theissen writes that the gospel appears to rely on several underlying sources, varying in form and in theology, which tells against the tradition that the gospel was based on Peter's preaching, while Elder argues that Mark is an oral work involving both a speaker and a writer who composed the text, which coheres with the patristic testimony. Various elements within the gospel, including the importance of the authority of Peter and the broadness of the basic theology, suggest that the author wrote in Syria or Palestine for a non-Jewish Christian community which had earlier absorbed the influence of pre-Pauline beliefs and then developed them further independent of Paul.

==== Matthew ====
Early Christian tradition, first attested by Papias of Hierapolis, held that the apostle Matthew, the tax-collector and disciple of Jesus, had written a Gospel in "Hebrew" (Aramaic, the language of Judea). Modern scholars interpret the tradition to mean that Papias, writing about 125–150 CE, believed that Matthew had made a collection of the sayings of Jesus. Aune argues Papias's description does not correspond well with the Gospel of Matthew as it was written in Greek and depends on Mark and Q, is not a collection of sayings, and is unlikely to have been written by an eyewitness. One theory is that Matthew produced a Semitic work and secondly a recension of that work in Greek; Josephus also claimed to write a translation of an Aramaic version of The Jewish War, though both the extant Gospel of Matthew and the War are not translations.

Internal evidence of the Gospel suggests that he was an ethnic Jewish male scribe from a Hellenised city, possibly Antioch in Syria, and that he wrote between 70 and 100 CE using a variety of oral traditions and written sources about Jesus.

==== Luke and Acts ====
There is general acceptance that the Gospel of Luke and the Acts of the Apostles originated as a two-volume work by a single author addressed to an otherwise unknown individual named Theophilus. This author was an "amateur Hellenistic historian" versed in Greek rhetoric, that being the standard training for historians in the ancient world.

According to tradition, first attested by Irenaeus, the author was Luke the Evangelist, the companion of the Apostle Paul, but many modern scholars have expressed doubt and opinion on the subject is evenly divided. Instead, they believe Luke–Acts was written by an anonymous Christian author who may not have been an eyewitness to any of the events recorded within the text. Some of the evidence cited comes from the text of Luke–Acts itself. In the preface to Luke, the author refers to having eyewitness testimony "handed down to us" and to having undertaken a "careful investigation", but the author does not mention his own name or explicitly claim to be an eyewitness to any of the events, except for the we passages. And in the we passages, the narrative is written in the first person plural—the author never refers to himself as "I" or "me". To those who are skeptical of an eyewitness author, the we passages are usually regarded as fragments of a second document, part of some earlier account, which was later incorporated into Acts by the later author of Luke–Acts, or simply a Greek rhetorical device used for sea voyages.

==== John ====
John 21:24 identifies the source of the Gospel of John as "the beloved disciple", and from the late 2nd century tradition, first attested by Irenaeus, this figure, unnamed in the Gospel itself, was identified with John the son of Zebedee. Scholars consider John 21 as an addition by either the author of John 1-20 or by a redactor, but no manuscript evidence for this assertion has been discovered, and a growing number view the passage as part of the original text. The narrator is also presented as a witness in 1:14, and the gospel gradually identifies its narrator as the beloved disciple, notably in chapter 19. The majority of scholars date the Gospel of John to c. 90-100. Current scholarship generally does not support the existence of a "signs gospel, and recent scholarship has tended to turn against positing hypothetical sources for John.

=== Epistles ===
==== Pauline epistles ====
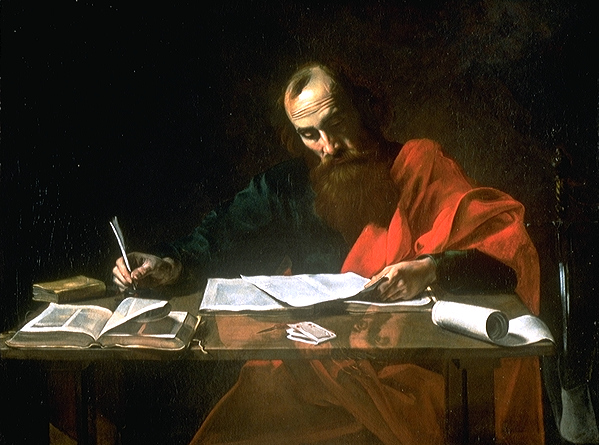
Saint Paul Writing His Epistles, 16th-century painting. Most scholars think Paul actually dictated his letters to a secretary, for example Romans 16:22 cites a scribe named Tertius.

The Epistle to the Romans, First Corinthians and Second Corinthians, Galatians, Philippians, 1 Thessalonians and the Epistle to Philemon are almost universally accepted as the work of Paul – the superscripts to all except Romans and Galatians identify these as coming from Paul and at least one other person, a practice which was not usual in letters of the period, and it is not clear what role these other persons had in their composition. There is some support for Paul's authorship of the three "Deutero-Pauline Epistles", Ephesians, Colossians, and 2 Thessalonians. The three Pastoral epistles – First and Second Timothy and Titus, are probably all from one author, but most historical-critical scholars regard them as the work of someone other than Paul.

==== Letter to the Hebrews ====
The Church included the Letter to the Hebrews as the fourteenth letter of Paul until the Reformation. Pauline authorship is now generally rejected, and the real author is unknown.

==== General epistles ====
The real authors are unknown and the names were attributed to them arbitrarily to make it seem more credible: Peter the apostle (First and Second Peter); the author of the Gospel of John (First, Second and Third John), writing in advanced age; "Jude, a servant of Jesus Christ and a brother of James" (Epistle of Jude); and James the Just, "a servant of God and of the Lord Jesus Christ" (James). In fact 1 John is anonymous, and 2 and 3 John identify their author only as "the Elder". Though 2 Peter states its author as "Simon Peter, a servant and apostle of Jesus Christ", most scholars today regard this as pseudonymous, and many hold the same opinion of James, 1 Peter and Jude.

=== Revelation ===
The author of the Book of Revelation was traditionally believed to be the same person as both John, the apostle of Jesus and John the Evangelist, the traditional author of the Fourth Gospel – the tradition can be traced to Justin Martyr, writing in the early 2nd century. Most biblical scholars now believe that these were separate individuals. The name "John" suggests that the author was a Christian of Jewish descent, and although he never explicitly identifies himself as a prophet it is likely that he belonged to a group of Christian prophets and was known as such to members of the churches in Asia Minor. Since the 2nd century the author has been identified with one of the Twelve Apostles of Jesus. This is commonly linked with an assumption that the same author wrote the Gospel of John. Others, however, have argued that the author could have been John the Elder of Ephesus, a view which depends on whether a tradition cited by Eusebius was referring to someone other than the apostle. The precise identity of "John" therefore remains unknown.

== See also ==
- Authorship of the Johannine works
- Authorship of the Petrine epistles
- Books of the Bible
- Dating the Bible
