= Theodotion =

Translator of the Bible from Hebrew to Greek

The inter-relationship between major ancient Old Testament manuscript traditions, showing the textual position of Theodotion (θ') among Greek versions.

Theodotion (/ˌθiːəˈdoʊʃən/; Ancient Greek: Θεοδοτίων/Theodotiōn) is traditionally identified as one of three major Jewish translators of the Hebrew Bible into Greek during the second century CE, alongside Aquila and Symmachus. According to Irenaeus (d. c.202 CE), Theodotion was a proselyte from Asia Minor, likely Ephesus (Adversus haereses III.23). Epiphanius dates his activity to the reign of Emperor Commodus (c.190 CE) (de Mensuris et Ponderibus §17), though this chronology may derive from the column order in Origen's Hexapla rather than historical evidence.

Theodotion's translation style is characterized as intermediate between Aquila's ultra-literal formalism and Symmachus's free rendering. A distinctive feature is his frequent transliteration of Hebrew terms (e.g., El for God) rather than translation, used both for realia lacking Greek equivalents and possibly out of reverence. His text survives primarily through quotations and marginal notes in manuscripts derived from Origen's Hexapla.

Theodotion's textual work encompassed multiple books of the Hebrew Bible, though scholarly debate continues regarding which texts genuinely stem from the second-century figure versus earlier Kaige recension revisions later attributed to him. His version included the Book of Baruch, the Additions to Daniel (including the Prayer of Azariah, Susanna, and Bel and the Dragon), and the expanded ending of the Book of Job.

== History ==
=== The Proto-Theodotionic Problem ===
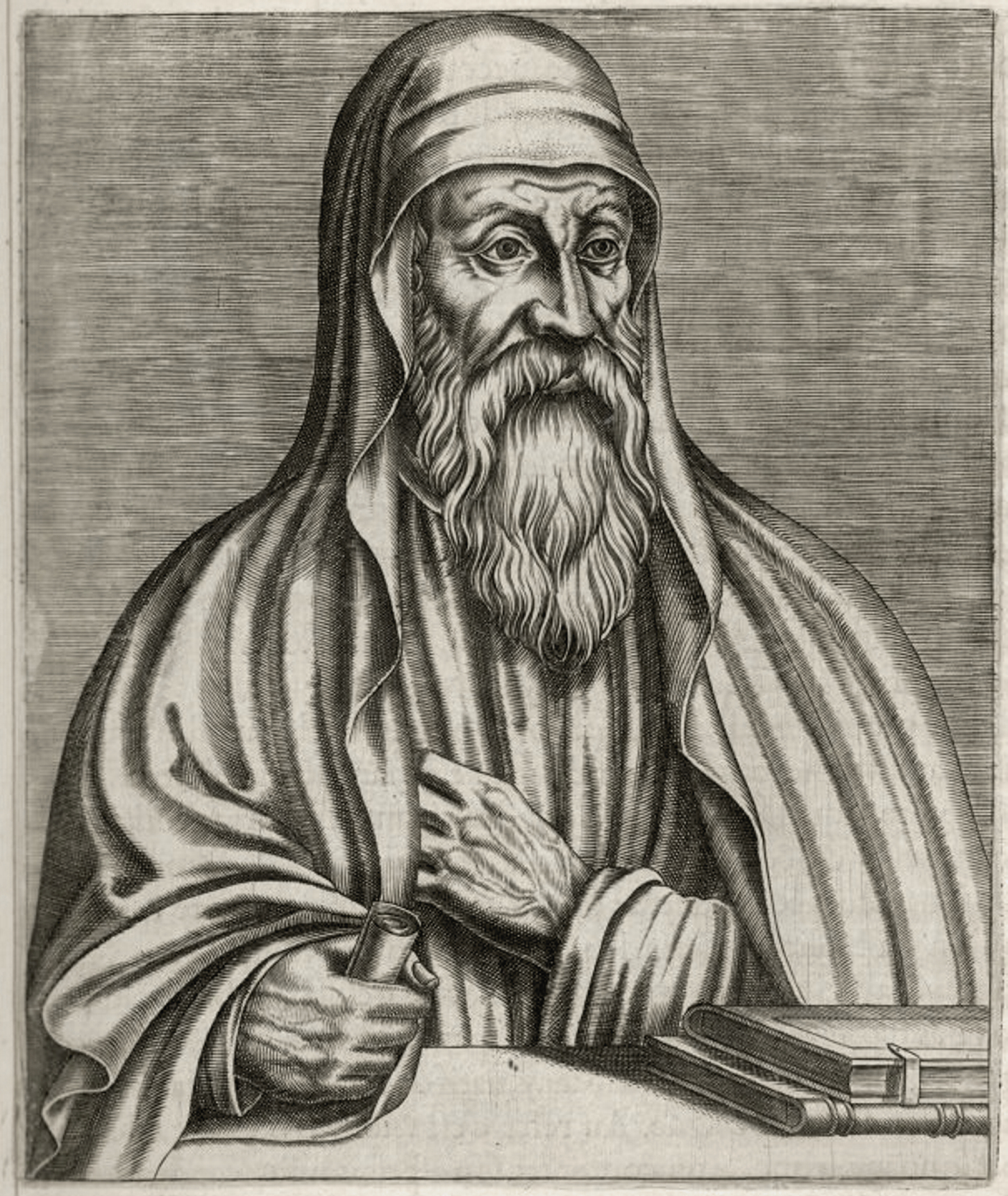
The majority of Theodotionic readings are preserved through Origen's (depicted above) Hexapla and manuscripts dependent on it.

The central scholarly puzzle surrounding Theodotion is the so-called proto-Theodotionic problem—the observation that readings attributed to Theodotion appear in texts predating the second-century CE translator by over a century. Early Christian texts including the New Testament contain Theodotionic readings: 1 Corinthians 15:54 quotes Isaiah 25:8 in a form matching Theodotion, and John 19:37 cites Zechariah 12:10 similarly. Additional Theodotionic readings appear throughout early Christian literature: in the Synoptic Gospels, Epistle to the Hebrews, Book of Revelation, and in extra-biblical writings such as The Shepherd of Hermas, Dialogue with Trypho, 1 Clement, and the Epistle of Barnabas.

Most problematically, the overwhelming majority of these early "Theodotionic" quotations derive from the Book of Daniel—the very book whose Theodotionic version, as already noted, superseded the Septuagint in church use. Armin Schmitt (1966, 2000) argued that the so-called θ′-Daniel text is not from the historical Theodotion but rather belongs to an earlier textual tradition: the Kaige recension, a first-century BCE Hebraizing revision of the Septuagint. If Schmitt is correct, the Daniel text read in churches and incorporated into Origen's Hexapla under Theodotion's name was not his original work but a pre-existing Kaige-type text later attributed to him.

The proto-Theodotionic problem extends beyond Daniel. Kevin G. O'Connell (1972) demonstrated that the assumed Theodotionic text of Exodus cannot be attributed to the second-century Theodotion, and Leonard Greenspoon (1983) reached the same conclusion for Joshua. The single marginal Psalter superscription pales in comparison to the 40–50 readings from Aquila and 30–35 from Symmachus, indicating a more primitive base text from its contemporaries. These findings suggest that multiple biblical books contain "Theodotionic" readings that predate any plausible second-century translator.

Early recognition of this chronological anomaly led Henry St. John Thackeray (1921) to posit an "Ur-Theodotion"—a proto-Theodotionic text tradition predating the patristic figure—though Thackeray could not identify its origins or nature. The proto-Theodotionic problem thus reveals a fundamental disconnect between the historical Theodotion described by Church Fathers and the textual tradition bearing his name.

=== Scholarly Theories on Theodotion's Identity ===
==== Barthélemy's Jonathan ben Uzziel Hypothesis ====
In his landmark study Les Devanciers d'Aquila (1963), Dominique Barthélemy proposed a radical solution to the proto-Theodotionic problem by identifying Theodotion with Jonathan ben Uzziel, a first-century CE Jewish sage traditionally credited with an Aramaic Targum to the Prophets. This identification would eliminate the chronological contradiction by placing Theodotion's activity in the first century CE rather than the late second century, making him the author—or at minimum a leading member—of the Kaige Recension (French: groupe kaige), the Hebraizing revision Barthélemy had identified in the Nahal Hever Minor Prophets scroll discovered in the Judaean Desert.

Barthélemy's thesis effectively dissolved the individual translator "Theodotion" described by Irenaeus and Epiphanius, replacing him with a first-century sage whose textual work was later misattributed to a second-century figure. The chronological sequence Aquila–Symmachus–Theodotion preserved in patristic testimony and reflected in Origen's Hexapla column arrangement would thus derive from editorial organization rather than historical activity. Barthélemy's hypothesis enjoyed initial acceptance as it appeared to resolve multiple anomalies simultaneously: the early attestations, the Kaige characteristics in "Theodotionic" texts, and the absence of clear biographical information about Theodotion beyond late patristic notices.

==== Paleographic Refutation and Chronological Reassessment ====
Barthélemy's identification was decisively undermined by Peter J. Parsons's (1990) paleographic analysis of the Naḥal Ḥever scroll itself. Parsons dated the manuscript to the late first century BCE—considerably earlier than Jonathan ben Uzziel's floruit (first century CE) and far predating any plausible second-century Theodotion. This dating pushes the Kaige Recension back into the first century BCE or earlier, severing any direct connection to Jonathan ben Uzziel and invalidating Barthélemy's specific identification.

The paleographic evidence demonstrates that the Kaige Recension arose as an independent textual phenomenon before either the historical Jonathan or the patristic Theodotion. Barthélemy's broader contribution—identifying the Kaige Recension itself and analyzing its Hebraizing revision principles—remains foundational to Septuagint scholarship, but his specific proposal linking Theodotion to Jonathan has been abandoned by most scholars.

==== Current Scholarly Consensus ====
Contemporary scholarship accepts a three-part framework resolving the proto-Theodotionic problem: (1) The so-called proto-Theodotionic texts belong to the Kaige or semi-Kaige textual families, which originated in the first century BCE as Hebraizing revisions of the Old Greek (original Septuagint translation); (2) A historical figure named Theodotion may have existed in the second century CE, known for exegetical or textual work, and a circulating Kaige-type text was subsequently attributed to his authority; (3) The Kaige Recension itself constitutes an independent textual phenomenon, chronologically and methodologically distinct from any individual second-century translator.

Thus "Theodotion" functions more as a scribal attribution—a label retrospectively attached to pre-existing Kaige-type texts—rather than identifying a discrete translator producing original work in the second century CE. Whether a real Theodotion existed, and if so what textual work he actually performed, remains uncertain. The textual tradition bearing his name demonstrably predates him by over a century. This solution parallels other cases of pseudepigraphic attribution in ancient textual transmission, where authoritative names became attached to anonymous works to enhance their credibility and circulation.

=== Relationship to the Kaige Recension ===
==== Barthélemy's Identification of Kaige ====
The Kaige Recension takes its name from a distinctive textual feature identified by Dominique Barthélemy (1963) in the Greek Minor Prophets scroll from Nahal Hever (8ḤevXIIgr): the stereotyped rendering of the Hebrew particle גַּם (gam, "also") with the Greek phrase καίγε (kaige, "and also"). Barthélemy considered this rendering particularly significant because it reflected contemporary Jewish exegetical methods emphasizing inclusive particles to derive additional legal meanings from scriptural texts. The Kaige Recension represents a systematic, Hebraizing revision of the earlier Old Greek translation, adjusting it toward closer conformity with Hebrew manuscripts ancestral to the Masoretic Text.

Beyond the diagnostic kaige rendering, Barthélemy identified numerous formal and semantic characteristics of this revision tradition. Formal traits include isomorphic word order (matching Hebrew sequence even at the cost of Greek idiom) and mechanical tense adjustment (eliminating the historical present tense used by Greek narrators to create immediacy, replacing it with past tenses to mirror Hebrew verb forms exactly). Semantic traits include stereotyped lexical equivalences: אִישׁ (ʾîš, "man") rendered exclusively by ἀνήρ (anēr) even when distributive sense ("each one") would naturally call for ἕκαστος (hekastos); אֵין (ʾên, "there is not") rendered invariably by οὐκ ἔστι (ouk esti) regardless of tense; and the remarkable distinction whereby short-form אֲנִי (ʾănî, "I") is rendered ἐγώ (egō) while long-form אָנֹכִי (ʾānōkî, also "I") receives ἐγώ εἰμι (egō eimi, "I am"), even when a finite verb immediately follows—producing constructions awkward or unidiomatic in Greek.

Barthélemy identified Kaige-type revision in multiple biblical books beyond the Minor Prophets, most notably in sections of Samuel and Kings previously isolated by Thackeray (1907) as stylistically distinct. Thackeray had divided the Greek text of Samuel–Kings (1–4 Kingdoms in Septuagint nomenclature) into sections αββγδ based on stylistic differences, attributing the more Hebraizing βγ (2 Samuel 11:2–1 Kings 2:11) and γδ (1 Kings 22:1–2 Kings 25:30) sections to a different, later translator than the freer α (1 Samuel), ββ (2 Samuel 1:1–11:1), and γ (1 Kings 2:12–21:43) sections. Barthélemy identified these Hebraizing sections as Kaige, and James D. Shenkel (1968) refined the boundaries, demonstrating that the βγ Kaige section begins at 2 Kingdoms 10:1 (= 2 Samuel 10:1).

Barthélemy also identified Kaige or Kaige-related characteristics in Chronicles (Paralipomenon), Ezekiel, Psalms, Nehemiah, Job, and Jeremiah, primarily in Codex Vaticanus. He spoke of a "Kaige group" (groupe kaige) rather than uniform recension, acknowledging variation in the intensity and consistency of Hebraizing traits across different books. Barthélemy alternately termed this textual tradition the "Palestinian recension," reflecting his hypothesis that it originated in Palestine and spread outward, eventually superseding the Old Greek in most manuscript traditions. The Palestinian origin is supported by the Nahal Hever scroll's discovery location in the Judaean Desert, though the specific Jewish group or sect responsible for the Kaige revision remains unidentified in scholarship.

==== Kaige Translation Technique and Scholarly Skill ====
Despite their rigid isomorphic principles, Kaige revisers demonstrated considerable skill in Greek. They preserved wordplay from the Old Greek where possible: for example, maintaining the pun in Judges 10:4 between πώλους (pōlous, "colts") and πόλεις (poleis, "cities"), reflecting Hebrew עֲיָרִים–עִירִים (ʿăyārîm–ʿîrîm). They maintained the Old Greek's distinction between δοῦλος (doulos, "slave") and παῖς (pais, "servant/child") for Hebrew עֶבֶד (ʿebed, "servant"), though shifting the distinction from relationship (Old Greek) to status (Kaige).

However, Kaige revisers also introduced theologically motivated changes. They retained the Old Greek rendering ἄλσος/ἄλση (alsos/alsē, "grove/groves") for Asherah from Judges 3:7 onward, but discontinued the Old Greek practice (beginning Judges 2:13) of using the feminine article with Baal (ἡ Βααλ, hē Baal). The feminine article had signaled that readers should substitute αἰσχύνη (aischynē, "shame") for the divine name, avoiding pronunciation of Baal's name; Kaige returned to the masculine article, perhaps reflecting different scribal attitudes toward divine name avoidance.

== See also ==
- Septuagint
- Aquila of Sinope
- Symmachus the Ebionite
- Kaige recension
- Hexapla
- Origen
- Old Greek
- Masoretic Text
- Textual criticism
- Biblical manuscript
- Nahal Hever
- Dead Sea Scrolls
- Greek Old Testament
- Dominique Barthélemy
- Books of Samuel
- Book of Daniel
