= Historicist interpretations of the Book of Daniel =

Historicism, a method of interpretation in Christian eschatology which associates biblical prophecies with actual historical events and identifies symbolic beings with historical persons or societies, has been applied to the Book of Daniel by many writers. The Historicist view follows a straight line of continuous fulfillment of prophecy which starts in Daniel's time and goes through John's writing of the Book of Revelation all the way to the Second Coming of Jesus Christ.

One of the aspects of the Protestant historicist paradigm is the speculation that the Little Horn Power which rose after the breakup of the Roman Empire is the Papacy, the predicted Antichrist power. Futurism and Preterism, alternate methods of prophetic interpretation, were used by Jesuits to oppose this interpretation that the Antichrist was the Papacy or the power of the Roman Catholic Church.

== Overview ==
Historicists claim that prophetic interpretation reveals the entire course of history of the church from the writing of the Book of Daniel, some centuries before the close of the 1st century, to the end of time. There are two kinds of prophecy in the Bible. One is Classical (or typical) prophecy which commonly deals with immediate events or issues. An example of this is Belshazzar's feast. Daniel 5 tells how Belshazzar holds a great feast and a hand appears and prophetically writes on the wall that his kingdom will be given to the Medes and the Persians. Apocalyptic prophecy is the other, and focuses on the distant future or the end time events relating to the Second Coming. This type of prophecy is what is found in Isaiah 24-27, Zechariah 9-14, and with Christ speaking about it in Matthew 24 as well as the book of Daniel.

The Historicists methodology was also used by Jerome (c. 347–420) in his writings, which can be seen in his study of the coming Antichrist. He warned that those substituting false interpretations for the actual meaning of Scripture belonged to the "synagogue of the Antichrist". "He that is not of Christ is of Antichrist", he wrote to Pope Damasus I. He believed that "the mystery of lawlessness" written about by Paul in 2 Thessalonians 2:7 was already in action when "every one chatters about his views." To Jerome, the power restraining this mystery of lawlessness was the Roman Empire, but as it fell this restraining force was removed. He warned a noble woman of Gaul:

He that letteth is taken out of the way, and yet we do not realize that Antichrist is near. Yes, Antichrist is near whom the Lord Jesus Christ "shall consume with the spirit of his mouth." "Woe unto them," he cries, "that are with child, and to them that give suck in those days."... Savage tribes in countless numbers have overrun all parts of Gaul. The whole country between the Alps and the Pyrenees, between the Rhine and the Ocean, has been laid waste by hordes of Quadi, Vandals, Sarmatians, Alans, Gepids, Herules, Saxons, Burgundians, Alemanni, and—alas for the commonweal!—even Pannonians.

In his Commentary on Daniel, Jerome noted, "Let us not follow the opinion of some commentators and suppose him to be either the Devil or some demon, but rather, one of the human race, in whom Satan will wholly take up his residence in bodily form." Instead of rebuilding the Jewish Temple to reign from, Jerome thought the Antichrist sat in God's Temple inasmuch as he made "himself out to be like God." He refuted Porphyry's idea that the "little horn" mentioned in Daniel chapter 7 was Antiochus IV Epiphanes by noting that the "little horn" is defeated by an eternal, universal ruler, right before the final judgment. Instead, he advocated that the "little horn" was the Antichrist:

We should therefore concur with the traditional interpretation of all the commentators of the Christian Church, that at the end of the world, when the Roman Empire is to be destroyed, there shall be ten kings who will partition the Roman world amongst themselves. Then an insignificant eleventh king will arise, who will overcome three of the ten kings... after they have been slain, the seven other kings also will bow their necks to the victor.

Jerome used the application of the year-day principle to the seventy weeks as made by others and refers to the interpretations of Eusebius, Hippolytus, Clement of Alexandria, Tertullian, and “the Hebrews”.."

Historicism was the belief held by the majority of the Protestant Reformers especially in identifying the Antichrist, from the time of Wycliffe. William Tyndale, an English Protestant reformer, held that while the Roman Catholic realms of that age were the empire of Antichrist, any religious organization that distorted the doctrine of the Old and New Testaments also showed the work of Antichrist. In his treatise The Parable of the Wicked Mammon, he expressly rejected the established Church teaching that looked to the future for an Antichrist to rise up, and he taught that Antichrist is a present spiritual force that will be with us until the end of the age under different religious disguises from time to time. The Catholic church tried to counter it with Preterism and Futurism during the Counter-Reformation. This alternate view served to bolster the Catholic Church's position against attacks by Protestants, and is viewed as a Catholic defense against the Protestant Historicist view which identified the Roman Catholic Church as a persecuting apostasy and the Pope with the Anti-Christ.

Prophetic commentaries in the early church usually interpreted individual passages rather than entire books. Protestant Reformers had a major interest in historicism, with a direct application to their struggle against the Papacy. Prominent leaders and scholars among them, including Martin Luther, John Calvin, Thomas Cranmer, John Thomas, John Knox, and Cotton Mather, identified the Roman Papacy as the Antichrist. The Centuriators of Magdeburg, a group of Lutheran scholars in Magdeburg headed by Matthias Flacius, wrote the 12-volume "Magdeburg Centuries" to discredit the papacy and identify the pope as the Antichrist. The fifth round of talks in the Lutheran-Roman Catholic dialogue notes,

In calling the pope the "antichrist," the early Lutherans stood in a tradition that reached back into the eleventh century. Not only dissidents and heretics but even saints had called the bishop of Rome the "antichrist" when they wished to castigate his abuse of power.

Rather than expecting a single Antichrist to rule the earth during a future Tribulation period, Luther, John Calvin and other Protestant reformers saw the Antichrist as a present feature in the world of their time, fulfilled in the papacy. such as the "little horn" of Daniel 7 and 8.

Isaac Newton's religious views on the historicist approach are in the work published in 1733, after his death, Observations upon the Prophesies of the Book of Daniel, and the Apocalypse of St. John. It took a stance toward the papacy similar to that of the early Protestant reformers. He avoided predictions based on prophetic literature, taking the view that prophesy when it has been shown to be fulfilled will be proof that God's providence has been imminently active in the world. This work regarded much prophesy as already fulfilled in the first millennium of the Christian era.

The historicist approach has been used in attempts to predict the date of the end of the world. An example in post-Reformation Britain is in the works of Charles Wesley, who predicted that the end of the world would occur in 1794.

== Origins in Judaism and Early Church ==
=== Early interpretations ===
The interpreters using the historicist approach for Bible Propecies had their origins in the Jewish apocalyptic writings such as we see in the book of Daniel, which predicted the future the time between their writing and the end of the world. Throughout most of history since the predictions of the book of Daniel, historicism has been widely used. This approach can be found in the works Josephus who interpreted the fourth kingdom of Daniel 2 as the Roman empire with a future power as the stone "not cut by human hands", that would overthrow the Romans. We also find it in the early church in the works of Irenaeus (and Tertullian) who interpreted the fourth kingdom of Daniel as the Roman empire and believed that it in the future was going to be broken up smaller kingdoms, as the iron mixed with clay. It is also found in the interpretations in the writings of writers such as Clement of Alexandria and Jerome.

=== Protestant interpretations ===
But it has particularly been associated with Protestantism and the Reformation, and was the standard interpretation from Lollard movement which was regarded as the precursor to the Protestant Reformation, and was known as the Protestant interpretation till modern times. The Jews before them had held the many prophecies to be fulfilled, were pointing the messiah such as those by the prophets Isaiah and Ezekiel.Jerome in his Commentary on Daniel went into the kingdoms that Daniel predicted. Many Protestant Reformers were interested in historicism and the day-year principle, assigning prophecies in the Bible to past, present and future events. It was prevalent in Wycliffe's writings, and taught by Martin Luther, John Calvin,

John Wesley, and Sir Isaac Newton and many others. George Whitefield, Charles Finney, C. H. Spurgeon, Matthew Henry, Adam Clarke, Albert Barnes, and Bishop Thomas Newton also are considered as advocates of this view. Modern proponents of historicism include theologian Francis Nigel Lee, and denominations derived the 19th century Millerite movement, including Seventh-day Adventists and Jehovah's Witnesses.

==== Seventh-day Adventists ====
In the Seventh-day Adventist interpretation of Daniel chapter 9, the 490 years is an uninterrupted period starting from "the time the word goes out to rebuild and restore Jerusalem," of Daniel 9:25 and ending 3½ years after Jesus' death.Daniel 9:25 The starting point identified with a decree by Artaxerxes I in 458/7 BCE to provide money to rebuild Jerusalem and its temple. The appearance of "Messiah the Prince" at the end of the 69 weeks (483 years) is aligned with Jesus' baptism in 27 CE. The 'cutting off' of the "anointed one" is applied to the Jesus' execution 3½ years after the end of the 483 years, bringing "atonement for iniquity" and "everlasting righteousness". Jesus' death is said to 'confirm' the "covenant" between God and mankind by in 31 CE "in the midst of" the last seven years. The end of the 70th week is associated with 34 CE when the gospel was redirected from only the Jews to all peoples.

== Daniel 2 ==
The second chapter of the Book of Daniel tells how Daniel interpreted a dream of Nebuchadnezzar, king of Babylon. The king saw a gigantic statue made of four metals, from its gold head to its feet of mingled iron and clay; as he watched, a stone "not cut by human hands" destroyed the statue and became a mountain filling the whole world. Daniel explained to the king that the statue represented four successive kingdoms beginning with Babylon, while the stone and mountain signified a kingdom established by God which would never be destroyed nor given to another people. The historicist interpretation of the dream identifies the four empires as the Babylonian (the head), Medo-Persian (arms and shoulders), Greek (thighs and legs), and Roman (the feet) empires. The period starts with the gold head personified by King Nebuchadnezzar, then the next one of the silver is Medo-Persia, with the brass is Greece, and with iron or Rome which deteriorate all the way to being poorly mixed with clay. This line lasts until the Kingdom of God replaces and destroys it.

"Thou, O king, sawest, and behold a great image. This great image, whose brightness was excellent, stood before thee; and the form thereof was terrible. This image's head was of fine gold, his breast and his arms of silver, his belly and his thighs of brass, His legs of iron, his feet part of iron and part of clay. Thou sawest till that a stone was cut out without hands, which smote the image upon his feet that were of iron and clay, and brake them to pieces. Then was the iron, the clay, the brass, the silver, and the gold, broken to pieces together, and became like the chaff of the summer threshingfloors; and the wind carried them away, that no place was found for them: and the stone that smote the image became a great mountain, and filled the whole earth." Daniel 2:31-35 (Authorized Version 1611)

As the Roman Empire evolved into the so-called Holy Roman Empire, the part that was never part of the Babylonian, Persian or Grecian empires, became Italy, Austria, Switzerland, France, the United Kingdom, Netherlands, Luxemburg, Belgium, Spain, and Portugal.

== Daniel 7 ==
The seventh chapter of the Book of Daniel tells of Daniel's vision of four world-kingdoms replaced by the kingdom of God. Four beasts come out of the sea, an angelic guide interprets the beasts as kingdoms and kings, the last of whom will make war on the "holy ones" of God, but he will be destroyed and the "holy ones" will be given eternal dominion. The historicist views of Daniel concern prophecies about the forces of evil viewed to have occurred as the four kingdoms of the image of Daniel 2, Babylon, Medo-Persia, Greece, and Rome. Each kingdom had the symbol of an animal (beast), and the last beast of Daniel is considered to be the pagan Rome and the Papacy which goes till Christ comes again.

The territory ruled by the 10 horns (ten kings) that grow out of this last beast, are the same European kingdoms that rose up from the ruins of the Roman empire, the mixture of iron and clay from the image of Daniel 2. Historian Niccolò Machiavelli lists the ten successor kingdoms to the Roman Empire in Western Europe as the Heruli, Suevi, Burgundians, Huns, Ostrogoths, Visigoths, Vandals, Lombards, Franks, and Anglo-Saxons. The prophecy says 3 were uprooted and history shows the Heruli were in 493; the Vandals in 534, and the Ostrogoths in 553.

"In the first year of Belshazzar king of Babylon Daniel had a dream and visions of his head upon his bed: then he wrote the dream, and told the sum of the matters. Daniel spake and said, I saw in my vision by night, and, behold, the four winds of the heaven strove upon the great sea. And four great beasts came up from the sea, diverse one from another. The first was like a lion, and had eagle's wings: I beheld till the wings thereof were plucked, and it was lifted up from the earth, and made stand upon the feet as a man, and a man's heart was given to it. And behold another beast, a second, like to a bear, and it raised up itself on one side, and it had three ribs in the mouth of it between the teeth of it: and they said thus unto it, Arise, devour much flesh. After this I beheld, and lo another, like a leopard, which had upon the back of it four wings of a fowl; the beast had also four heads; and dominion was given to it. After this I saw in the night visions, and behold a fourth beast, dreadful and terrible, and strong exceedingly; and it had great iron teeth: it devoured and brake in pieces, and stamped the residue with the feet of it: and it was diverse from all the beasts that were before it; and it had ten horns. I considered the horns, and, behold, there came up among them another little horn, before whom there were three of the first horns plucked up by the roots: and, behold, in this horn were eyes like the eyes of man, and a mouth speaking great things." Daniel 7:1-8 (Authorized Version 1611)

When Daniel looked at the horns, another little horn came up after three of the first horns had been plucked up. The Papacy arose at this time and was given status as a temporal (King/Bishop) by Charlemagne, and held political and spiritual power until the French Revolution.

== Daniel 8 ==
The eighth chapter of the Book of Daniel tells of Daniel's vision of a two-horned ram destroyed by a one-horned goat followed by the history of the "little horn". The Historicist interpretations and most scholars read it as the transition from the Persian to the Greek era with the coming power after them.

"Then I lifted up mine eyes, and saw, and, behold, there stood before the river a ram which had two horns: and the two horns were high; but one was higher than the other, and the higher came up last. I saw the ram pushing westward, and northward, and southward; so that no beasts might stand before him, neither was there any that could deliver out of his hand; but he did according to his will, and became great. And as I was considering, behold, an he goat came from the west on the face of the whole earth, and touched not the ground: and the goat had a notable horn between his eyes. And he came to the ram that had two horns, which I had seen standing before the river, and ran unto him in the fury of his power. And I saw him come close unto the ram, and he was moved with choler against him, and smote the ram, and brake his two horns: and there was no power in the ram to stand before him, but he cast him down to the ground, and stamped upon him: and there was none that could deliver the ram out of his hand. Therefore the he goat waxed very great: and when he was strong, the great horn was broken; and for it came up four notable ones toward the four winds of heaven. And out of one of them came forth a little horn, which waxed exceeding great, toward the south, and toward the east, and toward the pleasant land. And it waxed great, even to the host of heaven; and it cast down some of the host and of the stars to the ground, and stamped upon them.." Daniel 8:3-10 (Authorized Version 1611)

Historicist and other scholars applied Daniel's little horn as symbolizing the Papacy. This was also the leading view of the Reformers, that the Roman Catholic Church the “Empire of the Youngest Horn" of Daniel 8.

== Daniel 9 ==
Various biblical scholars have interpreted the Prophecy of 70 weeks using the Historicist methodology since around the third century CE. In the historicist view of the 70 weeks (generally interpreted as 490 years according to the day-year principle), Antiochus IV Epiphanes is considered irrelevant, and the period is instead applied to the Jewish nation from about the middle of the 5th century BCE until not long after the death of Jesus in the 1st century CE. The seven and sixty-two-week periods are generally understood as consecutive, non-overlapping periods starting with an event during the reign of Artaxerxes I and ending with Jesus' baptism.

Seventy weeks are determined upon thy people and upon thy holy city, to finish the transgression, and to make an end of sins, and to make reconciliation for iniquity, and to bring in everlasting righteousness, and to seal up the vision and prophecy, and to anoint the most Holy. Know therefore and understand, that from the going forth of the commandment to restore and to build Jerusalem unto the Messiah the Prince shall be seven weeks, and threescore and two weeks: the street shall be built again, and the wall, even in troublous times. And after threescore and two weeks shall Messiah be cut off, but not for himself: and the people of the prince that shall come shall destroy the city and the sanctuary; and the end thereof shall be with a flood, and unto the end of the war desolations are determined. And he shall confirm the covenant with many for one week: and in the midst of the week he shall cause the sacrifice and the oblation to cease, and for the overspreading of abominations he shall make it desolate, even until the consummation, and that determined shall be poured upon the desolate...

— Daniel 8:24-27, Authorized Version (1611)

The specific event during the reign of Artaxerxes I varies by denomination. References to "most holy", "anointed" ("Messiah") and "prince" have been interpreted as speaking of Jesus, and the reference to an anointed one being "cut off" at Daniel 9:26 is identified with the death of Christ, generally marking the midpoint of the seventieth week. The Jewish expectation of the fulfillment of the many Messianic prophecies was well known at the time of Jesus and the apostles. The "abomination of desolation" that Jesus refers to in the Gospel of Matthew adds a direct reference to this prophecy as being from the Book of Daniel, "Therefore when you see the abomination of desolation which was spoken of through Daniel the prophet…" (Matt 24:15, NASB).

== Daniel 11 ==
Daniel 11 deals with the details of the rulers starting with Persia and then Greece, and goes into the divided kingdom of Greece. Ultimately two of these divisions dominate to such an extent that the Bible portrays them under the titles of “The King of the North,” and “The King of the South.”

The armies of Babylon and Egypt, attacked from the north and the south of Israel. These warring powers are portrayed as enemies of the people of God, “The King of the North” and “The King of the South” symbolize the adversaries of God's people. The vision depicts the struggle by the powers which affect God's people, which becomes in verse 11:31-35 "The abomination that maketh desolate”. This is held to be the power of the Bishop of Rome or the Papacy

Chapter	Parallel sequence of prophetic elements as understood by Historicists					
	The Past				Present	The Future
Daniel 2	Head: Gold; (Babylon)	Chest & 2 arms: Silver; (Media-Persia)	Belly and thighs: Bronze; (Greece)	2 Legs: Iron; (Rome)	2 Feet with toes: Clay & Iron	Rock: God's unending kingdom left to no other people
Daniel 7	Winged Lion: (Babylon)	Lopsided Bear: (Media-Persia)	4 Headed–4 Winged Leopard: (Greece)	Iron toothed beast (Rome) with Little Horn	Judgment scene: Beast slain	A son of man comes in clouds: Given everlasting dominion; He gives it to the saints.
Daniel 8		2-horned Ram: Little Horn; (Media-Persia)	Uni- or 4-horned Goat: 4 Winds (Greece)	Little Horn: A Master of Intrigue	Cleansing of Sanctuary: Leads to:	(Kingdom of God)
Daniel 11-12		Kings (Persia)	North & South Kings: 4 Winds (Greece)	North & South Kings: A Contemptible Person of Intrigue; Pagan & Papal Rome	North & South Kings: End Times; Global religio-political government	Michael stands up.: Many dead awake to everlasting life

== See also ==
- Abomination of Desolation
- Apocalypticism
- Book of Daniel
- Christian eschatology
- Judgment day
- Prophecy of Seventy Weeks
- Whore of Babylon
- 2300 day prophecy
- Historicist interpretations of the Book of Revelation

== Sources ==
- Doukhan, Jacques (1979). "The Seventy Weeks of Daniel 9: An Exegetical Study" (PDF). Andrews University Seminary Studies. 17 (1): 1–22.
- Eijnatten, Joris van (2003), Liberty and concord in the United Provinces: religious toleration and the public in the eighteenth-century Netherlands, Leiden: Brill, ISBN 978-90-04-12843-9.
- Farrar, Frederic (1882), The Early Days of Christianity, vol. 2, NY: E.P Dutton + Co..
- Froom, Le Roy Edwin (1946), Part I, Colonial and Early National American Exposition. Part II, Old World Nineteenth Century Advent Awakening, The Prophetic Faith of our Fathers: The Historical Development of Prophetic Interpretation, vol. 3, The Review and Herald Publishing Association, archived from the original on 2012-06-14.
- Froom, Le Roy Edwin (1948). Pre-Reformation and Reformation Restoration, and Second Departure (PDF). The Prophetic Faith of our Fathers: The Historical Development of Prophetic Interpretation. Vol. 2. Washington, DC: The Review and Herald Publishing Association.
- Froom, Le Roy Edwin (1950), Early Church Exposition, Subsequent Deflections, and Medieval Revival, The Prophetic Faith of our Fathers: The Historical Development of Prophetic Interpretation, vol. 1, The Review and Herald Publishing Association, archived from the original on 2012-06-14.
- Froom, Leroy Edwin (1954), The Prophetic Faith of Our Fathers, vol. 2.
- Holbrook, Frank B. (1983), What Prophecy Means to This Church, Adventist Ministry, archived from the original on 2011-09-16.
- Jerome (1893) [347-420]. "Letter to Pope Damasus". In Schaff, Philip (ed.). A Select Library of Nicene and Post-Nicene Fathers of the Christian Church. 2nd series. Vol. VI. Henry Wace. New York: The Christian Literature Company. p. 19.
- Jerome (1893b) [347-420]. "The Dialogue against the Luciferians". In Schaff, Philip (ed.). A Select Library of Nicene and Post-Nicene Fathers of the Christian Church. 2nd series. Vol. VI. Henry Wace. New York: The Christian Literature Company. p. 334.
- Jerome (1893c) [347-420]. "Against the Pelagians, Book I". In Schaff, Philip (ed.). A Select Library of Nicene and Post-Nicene Fathers of the Christian Church. 2nd series. Vol. VI. Henry Wace. New York: The Christian Literature Company. p. 449.
- Jerome (1893d) [347-420]. "Letter to Ageruchia". In Schaff, Philip (ed.). A Select Library of Nicene and Post-Nicene Fathers of the Christian Church. 2nd series. Vol. VI. Henry Wace. New York: The Christian Literature Company. pp. 236–7.
- Jerome (1958) [347-420]. Archer, Gleason L. (ed.). Jerome's Commentary of Daniel (Translation). Grand Rapids, Michigan: Baker Book House. Archived from the original on 26 May 2010.
- Knight, George (2000). A Search for Identity. Review and Herald Pub.
- Lee, Francis Nigel, The Non-Preterist Historicalism of John Calvin and the Westminster Standards, archived from the original on 2006-10-09.
- Newport, Kenneth GC (2000), Apocalypse and millennium: studies in biblical eisegesis (1 ed.), Cambridge: Cambridge University Press, ISBN 978-0-521-77334-8.
- Nichol, Francis D (1980), Bible commentary, SDA.
- Payne, J. Barton (1978). "The Goal of Daniel's Seventy Weeks" (PDF). Journal of the Evangelical Theological Society. 21 (2): 97–115.
- Shea, William H. (1991). "When did the Seventy Weeks of Daniel 9:24 Begin?". Journal of the Adventist Theological Society. 2 (1): 115–38. Archived from the original on 2023-03-26.
- Smith, Uriah (1897). Daniel and the Revelation. Southern Publishing Association.
- Stuart, Moses (1845), A Commentary on The Apocalypse.
