= Book of Daniel =

Book of the Bible

The Book of Daniel is a biblical apocalypse set in the 6th century BC and considered by mainstream Bible scholars to have been written in the 2nd century BC. It is ostensibly a narrative detailing the experiences and prophetic visions of Daniel, a Jewish exile in Babylon. The text features prophecy rooted in Jewish history as well as a portrayal of the end times that is cosmic in scope and political in its focus. The message of the text intended for the original audience was that just as the God of Israel saves Daniel from his enemies, so too he would save the Israelites in their present oppression.

The Hebrew Bible includes Daniel as one of the Ketuvim ("Writings"), while Christian biblical canons group the work with the major prophets. It divides into two parts: a set of six court tales in chapters 1–6, written mostly in Biblical Aramaic, and four apocalyptic visions in chapters 7–12, written mainly in Late Biblical Hebrew; the Septuagint contains three additional sections in Koine Greek: the Prayer of Azariah and Song of the Three Holy Children, Susanna, and Bel and the Dragon. Daniel and other Jewish apocalyptic literature from the period of antiquity (outside of John's Revelation) are all pseudonymous.

The book's themes have resonated throughout the ages, including with the community of the Dead Sea Scrolls and the authors of the canonical gospels and the Book of Revelation. From the 2nd century to the modern era, religious movements, including the Reformation and later millennialist movements, have been deeply influenced by it. The book is considered vaticinium ex eventu.

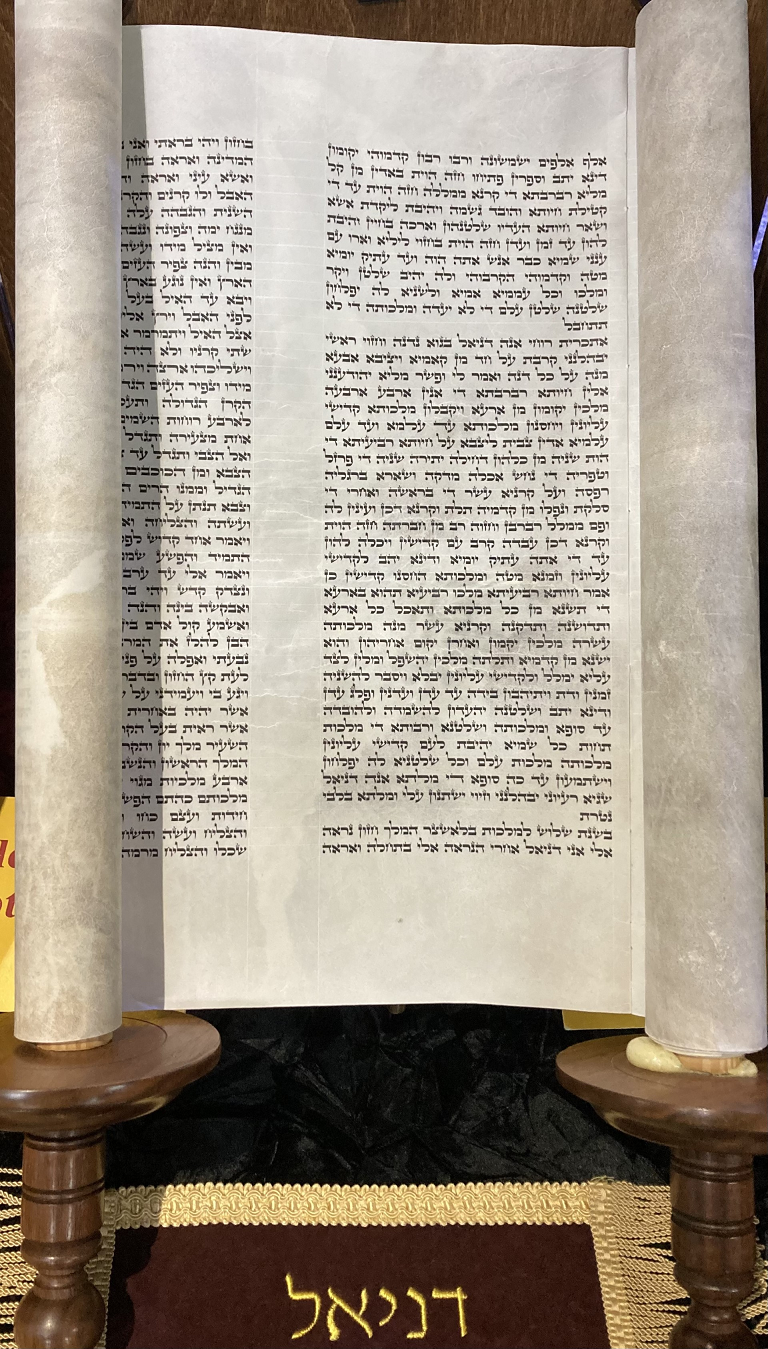
Scroll of the book Daniel in Hebrew

== Structure ==
=== Divisions ===
The Book of Daniel is divided between the court tales of chapters 1–6 and the apocalyptic visions of 7–12, and between the Hebrew of chapters 1 and 8–12 and the Aramaic of chapters 2–7. The division is reinforced by the chiastic arrangement of the Aramaic chapters (see below), and by a chronological progression in chapters 1–6 from Babylonian to Median rule, and from Babylonian to Persian rule in chapters 7–12. Various suggestions have been made by scholars to explain the fact that the genre division does not coincide with the other two, but it appears that the language division and concentric structure of chapters 2–6 are artificial literary devices designed to bind the two halves of the book together. The following outline is provided by Collins in his commentary on Daniel:

PART I: Tales (chapters 1:1–6:29)

- 1: Introduction (1:1–21 – set in the Babylonian era, written in Hebrew)
- 2: Nebuchadnezzar's dream of four kingdoms (2:1–49 – Babylonian era; Aramaic)
- 3: The fiery furnace (3:1–30/3:1-23, 91-97 – Babylonian era; Aramaic)
- 4: Nebuchadnezzar's madness (3:31/98–4:34/4:1-37 – Babylonian era; Aramaic)
- 5: Belshazzar's feast (5:1–6:1 – Babylonian era; Aramaic)
- 6: Daniel in the lions' den (6:2–29 – Median era with mention of Persia; Aramaic)

PART II: Visions (chapters 7:1–12:13)

- 7: The beasts from the sea (7:1–28 – Babylonian era: Aramaic)
- 8: The ram and the he-goat (8:1–27 – Babylonian era; Hebrew)
- 9: Interpretation of the seventy weeks' prophecy (9:1–27 – Median era; Hebrew)
- 10: The angel's revelation: kings of the north and south (10:1–12:13 – Persian era, mention of Greek era; Hebrew)

=== Chiastic structure in the Aramaic section ===
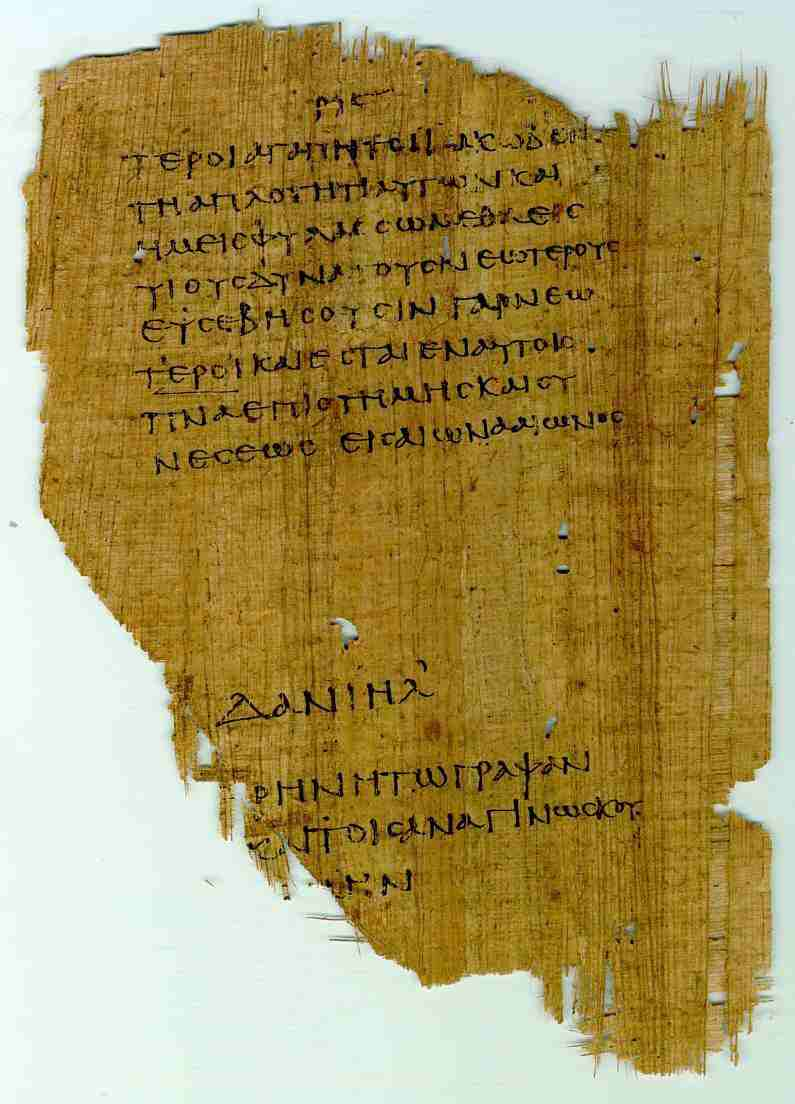
Papyrus 967, a 3rd-century-AD manuscript of a Greek translation of Daniel

There is a recognised chiasm (a concentric literary structure in which the main point of a passage is placed in the centre and framed by parallel elements on either side in "ABBA" fashion) in the chapter arrangement of the Aramaic section. The following is taken from Paul Redditt's "Introduction to the Prophets":

- A1 (2:4b-49) – A dream of four kingdoms replaced by a fifth
  - B1 (3:1–30) – Daniel's three friends in the fiery furnace
    - C1 (4:1–37) – Daniel interprets a dream for Nebuchadnezzar
    - C2 (5:1–31) – Daniel interprets the handwriting on the wall for Belshazzar
  - B2 (6:1–28) – Daniel in the lions' den
- A2 (7:1–28) – A vision of four world kingdoms replaced by a fifth

== Content ==
=== Introduction in Babylon (chapter 1) ===
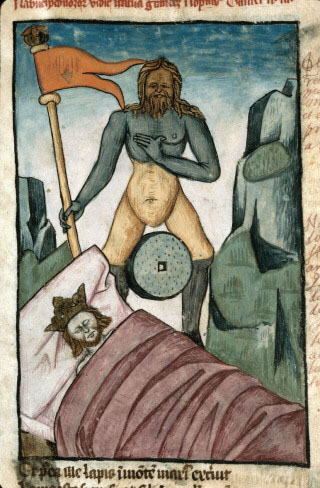
Nebuchadnezzar's dream: the composite statue (France, 15th century)

In the third year of King Jehoiakim, God allows Jerusalem to fall into the power of Nebuchadnezzar II, king of Babylon. (Note: Jehoiakim: King of Judah 608–598 BC; his third year would be either 606 or 605, depending how years are counted.) Young Israelites of noble and royal family, "without physical defect, and handsome," versed in wisdom and competent to serve in the palace of the king, are taken to Babylon to be taught the literature and language of that nation. Among them are Daniel and his three companions, who refuse to touch the royal food and wine. Their overseer fears for his life in case the health of his charges deteriorates, but Daniel suggests a trial and the four emerge healthier than their counterparts from ten days of consuming nothing but vegetables and water. They are allowed to continue to refrain from eating the king's food, and to Daniel, God gives insight into visions and dreams. When their training is done Nebuchadnezzar finds them 'ten times better' than all the wise men in his service and therefore keeps them at his court, where Daniel continues until the first year of King Cyrus. (Note: Cyrus: Persian conqueror of Babylon, 539 BC.)

=== Nebuchadnezzar's dream of four kingdoms (chapter 2) ===
In the second year of his reign, Nebuchadnezzar has a dream. When he wakes up, he realizes that the dream has some important message, so he consults his wise men. Wary of their potential to fabricate an explanation, the king refuses to tell the wise men what he saw in his dream. Rather, he demands that his wise men tell him what the content of the dream was, and then interpret it. When the wise men protest that this is beyond the power of any man, he sentences all, including Daniel and his friends, to death. Daniel receives an explanatory vision from God: Nebuchadnezzar had seen an enormous statue with a head of gold, breast and arms of silver, belly and thighs of bronze, legs of iron, and feet of mixed iron and clay, then saw the statue destroyed by a rock that turned into a mountain filling the whole earth. Daniel explains the dream to the king: the statue symbolized four successive kingdoms, starting with Nebuchadnezzar, all of which would be crushed by God's kingdom, which would endure forever. Nebuchadnezzar acknowledges the supremacy of Daniel's god, raises Daniel over all his wise men, and places Daniel and his companions over the province of Babylon.

=== The fiery furnace (chapter 3) ===
Daniel's companions Shadrach, Meshach, and Abednego refuse to bow to King Nebuchadnezzar's golden statue and are thrown into a fiery furnace. Nebuchadnezzar is astonished to see a fourth figure in the furnace with the three, one "with the appearance like a son of the gods." So the king calls the three to come out of the fire, blesses the God of Israel, and decrees that any who blaspheme against him shall be torn limb from limb.

=== Nebuchadnezzar's madness (chapter 4) ===
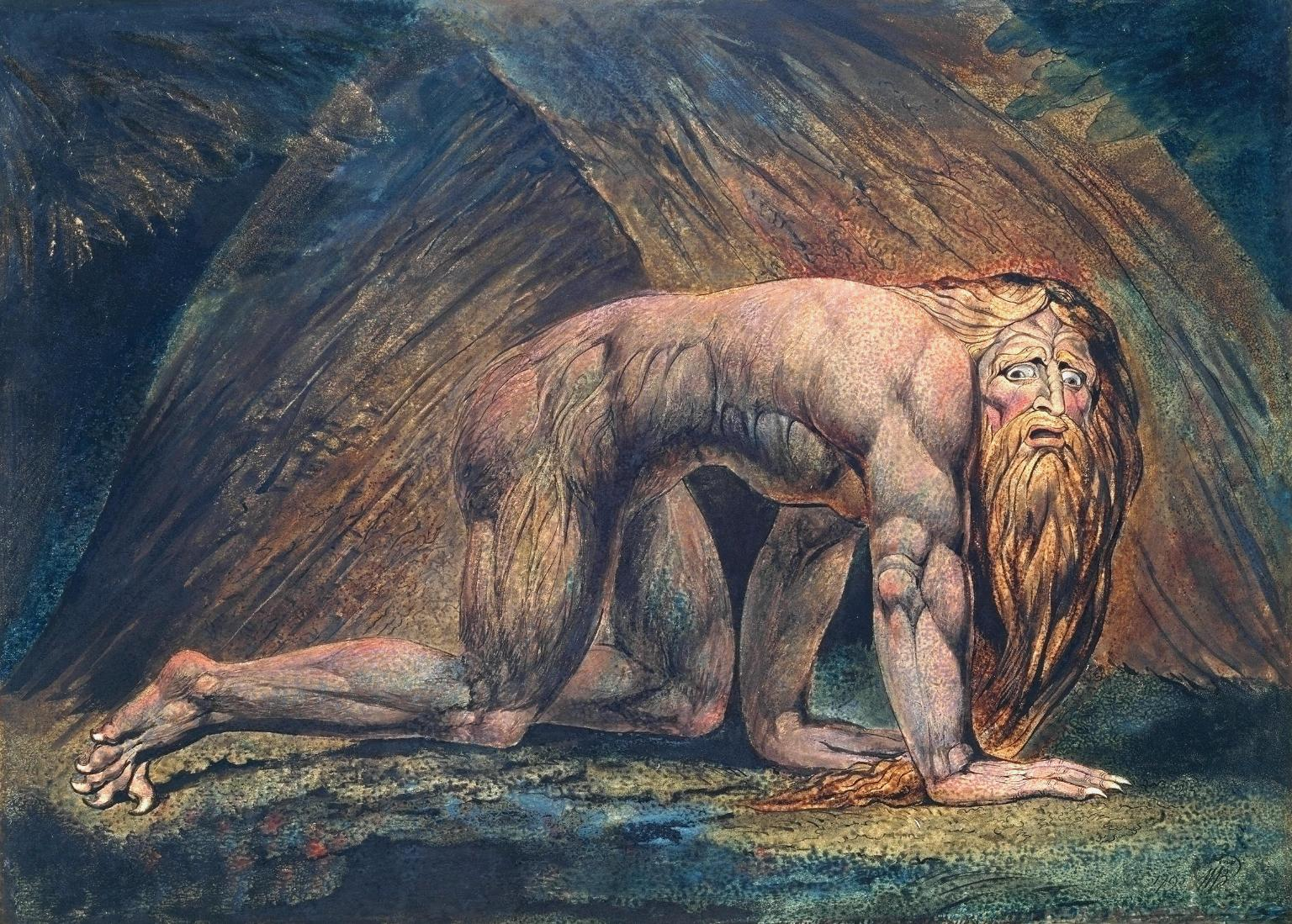
Nebuchadnezzar by William Blake (between c. 1795 and 1805)

Nebuchadnezzar recounts a dream of a huge tree that is suddenly cut down at the command of a heavenly messenger. Daniel is summoned and interprets the dream. The tree is Nebuchadnezzar himself, who for seven years will lose his mind and live like a wild beast. All of this comes to pass until, at the end of the specified time, Nebuchadnezzar acknowledges that "heaven rules" and his kingdom and sanity are restored.

=== Belshazzar's feast (chapter 5) ===
Belshazzar and his nobles blasphemously drink from sacred Jewish temple vessels, offering praise to inanimate gods, until a mysterious hand suddenly appears and writes upon the wall. The horrified king summons Daniel, who upbraids him for his lack of humility before God and interprets the message: Belshazzar's kingdom will be given to the Medes and Persians. Belshazzar rewards Daniel and raises him to be third in the kingdom, and that very night Belshazzar is slain and Darius the Mede takes the kingdom. (Note: Darius the Mede: No such person is known to history (see Levine, 2010, p. 1245, footnote 31). "Darius" is in any case a Persian, not a Median, name. The Persian army which captured Babylon was under the command of a certain Gobryas (or Gubaru), a Babylonian and former provincial governor who turned against his royal master, on behalf of Cyrus, the Persian king. The author of Daniel may have introduced the reference to a Mede in order to fulfill Isaiah and Jeremiah, who prophesied that the Medes would overthrow Babylon, and confused the events of 539 with those of 520 BC, when Darius I captured Babylon after an uprising. See Hammer, 1976, pp. 65–66.)

=== Daniel in the lions' den (chapter 6) ===
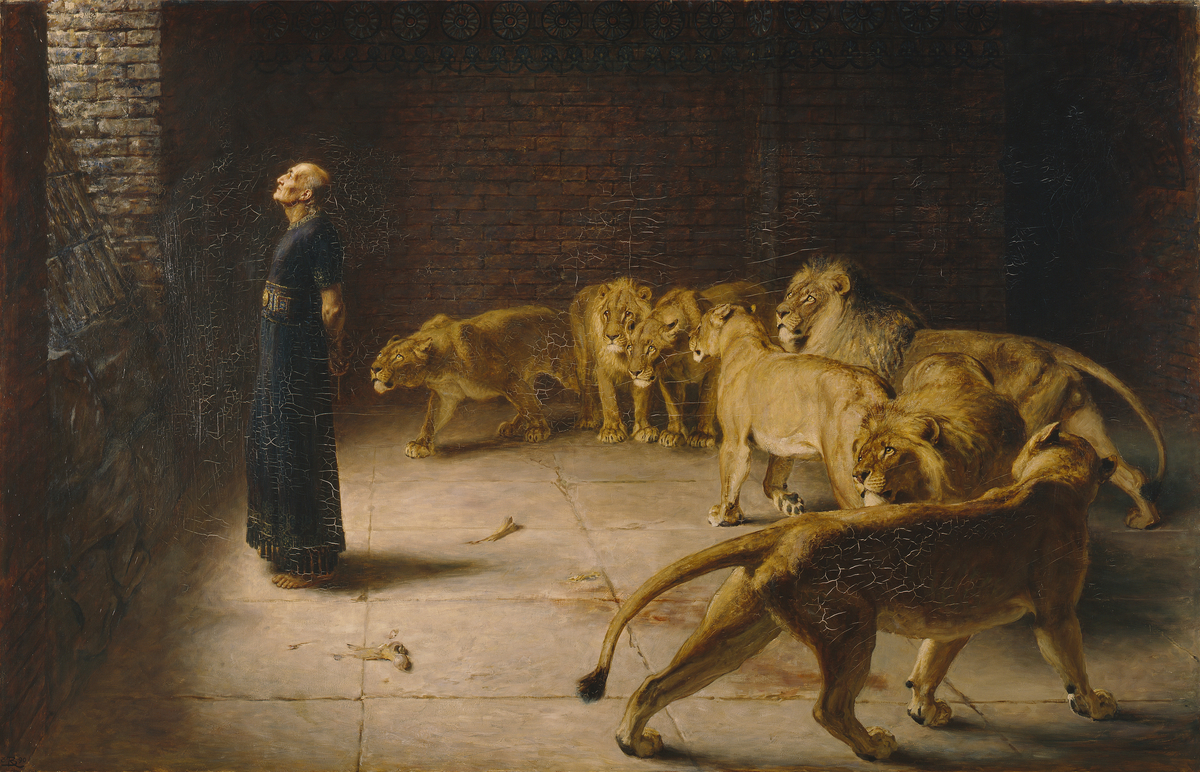
Daniel's Answer to the King by Briton Rivière (1892)

Darius elevates Daniel to high office, exciting the jealousy of other officials. Knowing of Daniel's devotion to his God, his enemies trick the king into issuing an edict forbidding worship of any other god or man for a 30-day period. Daniel continues to pray three times a day to God towards Jerusalem; he is accused and King Darius, forced by his own decree, throws Daniel into the lions' den. But God shuts up the mouths of the lions, and the next morning Darius rejoices to find him unharmed. The king casts Daniel's accusers into the lions' pit together with their wives and children to be instantly devoured, while he himself acknowledges Daniel's God as he whose kingdom shall never be destroyed.

=== Vision of the beasts from the sea (chapter 7) ===
In the first year of Belshazzar, Daniel has a dream of four monstrous beasts arising from the sea. (Note: First year of Belshazzar: Probably 553 BC, when Belshazzar was given royal power by his father, Nabonidus. See Levine, 2010, p. 1248, footnote 7.1–8.) The fourth, a beast with ten horns, devours the whole earth, treading it down and crushing it, and a further small horn appears and uproots three of the earlier horns. The Ancient of Days judges and destroys the beast, and "one like a son of man" is given everlasting kingship over the entire world. One of Daniel's attendants explains that the four beasts represent four kings, but that "the holy ones of the Most High" would receive the everlasting kingdom. The fourth beast would be a fourth kingdom with ten kings, and another king who would pull down three kings and make war on the "holy ones" for "a time, two times and a half," after which the heavenly judgment will be made against him and the "holy ones" will receive the everlasting kingdom.

=== Vision of the ram and goat (chapter 8) ===
In the third year of Belshazzar Daniel has a vision of a ram and goat. The ram has two mighty horns, one longer than the other, and it charges west, north and south, overpowering all other beasts. A goat with a single horn appears from the west and destroys the ram. The goat becomes very powerful until the horn breaks off and is replaced by four lesser horns. A small horn that grows very large, it stops the daily temple sacrifices and desecrates the sanctuary for two thousand three hundred "evenings and mornings" (which could be either 1,150 or 2,300 days) until the temple is cleansed. The angel Gabriel informs him that the ram represents the Medes and Persians, the goat is Greece, and the "little horn" is a wicked king.

=== Vision of the Seventy Weeks (chapter 9) ===
In the first year of Darius the Mede, Daniel meditates on the word of Jeremiah that the desolation of Jerusalem would last seventy years; he confesses the sin of Israel and pleads for God to restore Israel and the "desolated sanctuary" of the Temple. The angel Gabriel explains that the seventy years stand for seventy "weeks" of years (490 years), during which the Temple will first be restored, then later defiled by a "prince who is to come," "until the decreed end is poured out."

=== Vision of the kings of north and south (chapters 10–12) ===
Daniel 10: In the third year of Cyrus (Note: "Third year of Cyrus": 536 BC. The author has apparently counted back seventy years to the "third year of Jehoiakim," 606 BC, to round out Daniel's prophetic ministry. See Towner, p. 149.) Daniel sees in his vision an angel (called "a man", but clearly a supernatural being) who explains that he is in the midst of a war with the "prince of Persia", assisted only by Michael, "your prince." The "prince of Greece" will shortly come, but first he will reveal what will happen to Daniel's people.

Daniel 11: A future king of Persia will make war on the king of Greece, a "mighty king" will arise and wield power until his empire is broken up and given to others, and finally the king of the south (identified in verse 8 as Egypt) will go to war with the "king of the north." After many battles (described in great detail) a "contemptible person" will become king of the north; this king will invade the south two times, the first time with success, but on his second he will be stopped by "ships of Kittim." He will turn back to his own country, and on the way his soldiers will desecrate the Temple, abolish the daily sacrifice, and set up the abomination of desolation. He will defeat and subjugate Libya and Egypt, but "reports from the east and north will alarm him," and he will meet his end "between the sea and the holy mountain."

Daniel 12: At this time Michael will come. It will be a time of great distress, but all those whose names are written will be delivered. "Multitudes who sleep in the dust of the earth will awake, some to everlasting life, others to shame and everlasting contempt; those who are wise will shine like the brightness of the heavens, and those who lead many to righteousness, like the stars for ever and ever." In the final verses the remaining time to the end is revealed: "a time, times and half a time" (three years and a half). Daniel fails to understand and asks again what will happen, and is told: "From the time that the daily sacrifice is abolished and the abomination that causes desolation is set up, there will be 1,290 days. Blessed is the one who waits for and reaches the end of the 1,335 days."

=== Additions to Daniel (Greek text tradition) ===
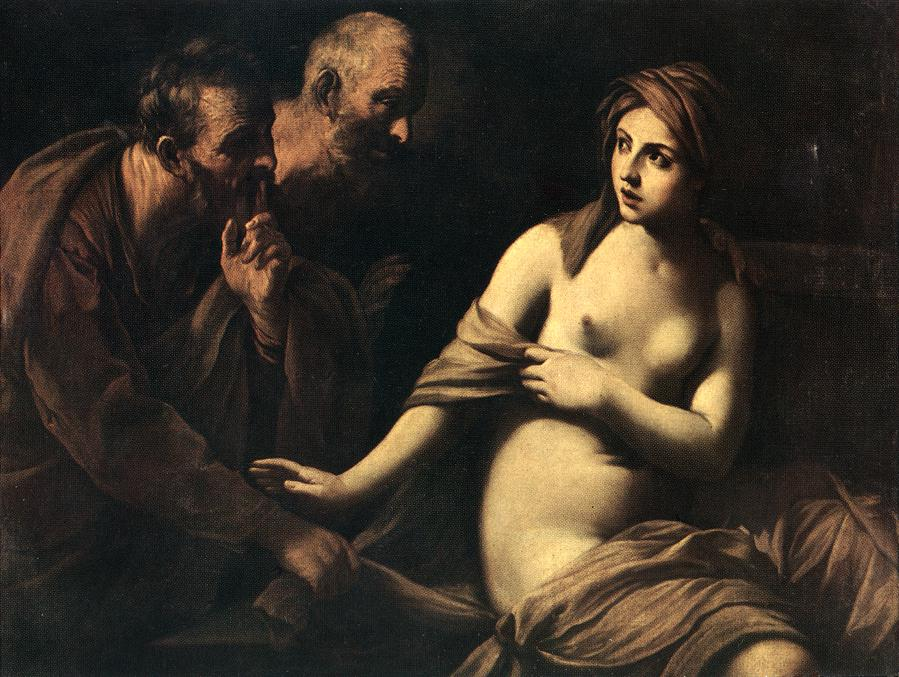
Susanna and the Elders by Guido Reni (1820–1825)

The Greek text of Daniel is considerably longer than the Hebrew, due to three additional stories: they remain in Catholic and Orthodox Christian Bibles but were rejected by the Christian Protestant movement in the 16th century on the basis that they were absent from the Hebrew Bible.

- The Prayer of Azariah and Song of the Three Holy Children, placed after Daniel 3:23;
- The story of Susanna and the Elders, placed before chapter 1 in some Greek versions and after chapter 12 in others;
- The story of Bel and the Dragon, placed at the end of the book.

The Book of Daniel is preserved in the 12-chapter Masoretic Text and in two longer Greek versions, the original Septuagint version, c. 100 BC, and the later Theodotion version from c. 2nd century CE. Both Greek texts contain the three additions to Daniel. Theodotion is much closer to the Masoretic Text and became so popular that it replaced the original Septuagint version in all but two manuscripts of the Septuagint itself. The Greek additions were apparently never part of the Hebrew text. Several Old Greek texts of the Book of Daniel have been discovered, and the original form of the book is being reconstructed.

== Historical background ==
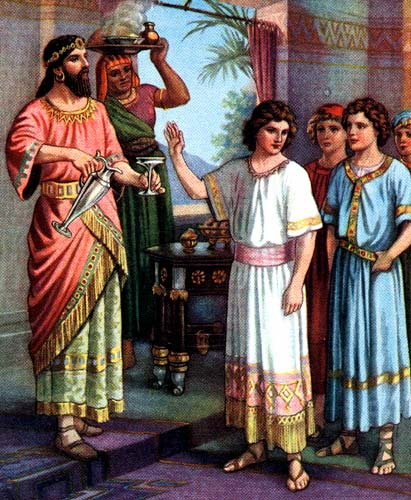
Daniel refusing to eat at the King's table, early-1900s Bible illustration

The visions of chapters 7–12 reflect the crisis which took place in Judea in 167–164 BC when Antiochus IV Epiphanes, the Greek king of the Seleucid Empire, threatened to destroy traditional Jewish worship in Jerusalem. When Antiochus came to the throne in 175 BC the Jews were largely pro-Seleucid. The High Priestly family was split by rivalry, and one member, Jason, bribed Antiochus to be made High Priest and make Jerusalem a polis, or Greek city. This meant, among other things, that city government would be in the hands of the citizens, which meant in turn that citizenship would be a valuable commodity, to be purchased from Jason. None of this threatened the Jewish religion, and the reforms were widely welcomed, especially among the Jerusalem aristocracy and the leading priests. Three years later, Jason was deposed when another priest, Menelaus, bribed Antiochus an even larger sum for the post of High Priest.

Antiochus invaded Egypt twice, in 169 BC with success, but on the second incursion, in late 168 BC, he was forced to withdraw by the Romans. Jason, hearing a rumour that Antiochus was dead, attacked Menelaus to take back the High Priesthood. Antiochus drove Jason out of Jerusalem, plundered the Temple, and introduced measures to pacify his Egyptian border by imposing complete Hellenization: the Jewish Book of the Law was prohibited and on 15 December 167 BC an "abomination of desolation", probably a Greek altar, was introduced into the Temple. With the Jewish religion now clearly under threat a resistance movement sprang up, led by the Maccabee brothers, and over the next three years it won sufficient victories over Antiochus to take back and purify the Temple.

The crisis which the author of Daniel addresses is the defilement of the altar in Jerusalem in 167 BC (first introduced in chapter 8:11): the daily offering which used to take place twice a day, at morning and evening, stopped, and the phrase "evenings and mornings" recurs through the following chapters as a reminder of the missed sacrifices. But whereas the events leading up to the sacking of the Temple in 167 BC and the immediate aftermath are remarkably accurate, the predicted war between the Syrians and the Egyptians (11:40–43) never took place, and the prophecy that Antiochus would die in Palestine (11:44–45) was inaccurate (he died in Persia), as Daniel transitions from making "quasi-predictions" based on history to an imaginary scenario taken from the scriptures of Antiochus' downfall rather than a straightforward prediction. This point of the text has led most scholars to the conclusion that the account must have been completed near the end of the reign of Antiochus but before his death in December 164 BC, or at least before news of it reached Jerusalem, and the consensus of modern scholarship is accordingly that the book dates to the period 167–163 BC.

== Composition ==
=== Development ===
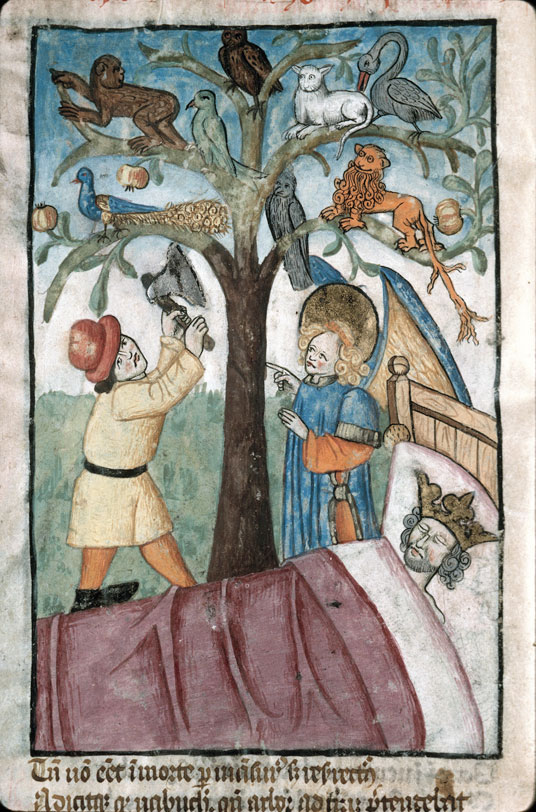
Nebuchadnezzar's dream: the felled tree (France, 15th century)

It is generally accepted that Daniel originated as a collection of Aramaic court tales, later expanded by Hebrew revelations. The court tales may have originally circulated independently, but the edited collection was probably composed in the third or early second-century BC. Chapter 1 was composed in Aramaic at this time as a brief introduction to provide historical context, introduce the characters of the tales, and explain how Daniel and his friends came to Babylon. The visions of chapters 7–12 were added, and chapter 1 was translated into Hebrew at the third stage when the final book was being drawn together. This final stage, marking the composition of the book of Daniel, took place between the desecration of the Temple by Antiochus IV Epiphanes in 167 and his death in 164 BC.

=== Authorship ===
Daniel is a product of "Wisdom" circles, but the type of wisdom is mantic (i.e., the discovery of heavenly secrets from earthly signs) rather than the wisdom of learning—the main source of wisdom in Daniel is allegedly God's revelation. It is one of a large number of Jewish apocalypses, all of them pseudonymous. The stories of the first half are legendary in origin, and the visions of the second the product of anonymous authors in the Maccabean period (2nd century BC). Chapters 1–6 are in the voice of an anonymous narrator, except for chapter 4 which is in the form of a letter from king Nebuchadnezzar; the second half (chapters 7–12) is presented by Daniel himself, introduced by the anonymous narrator in chapters 7 and 10.

The author/editor was probably an educated Jew, knowledgeable in Greek learning, and of high standing in his own community. It is possible that the name of Daniel was chosen as the hero of the book because of his reputation as a wise seer in Hebrew tradition. Ezekiel, who lived during the Babylonian exile, mentioned him in association with Noah and Job (Ezekiel 14:14) as a figure of legendary wisdom (28:3), and a hero named Daniel (more accurately Dan'el, but the spelling is close enough for the two to be regarded as identical) features in a late 2nd millennium myth from Ugarit. "The legendary Daniel, known from long ago but still remembered as an exemplary character ... serves as the principal human 'hero' in the biblical book that now bears his name"; Daniel is the wise and righteous intermediary who can interpret dreams and thus convey the will of God to humans, the recipient of visions from on high that are interpreted to him by heavenly intermediaries.

Michael Segal argued that Daniel 2 had deliberate parallels with Joseph found in Genesis 41, and the text is a composite. Joshua M. Philpot would outline that Daniel 1-6 was potentially modelled after Genesis 37–50.

=== Dating ===
The prophecies of Daniel are accurate down to the career of Antiochus IV Epiphanes, king of Syria and oppressor of the Jews, but not in its prediction of his death: the author seems to know about Antiochus' two campaigns in Egypt (169 and 167 BC), the desecration of the Temple (the "abomination of desolation"), and the fortification of the Akra (a fortress built inside Jerusalem), but he seems to know nothing about the reconstruction of the Temple or about the actual circumstances of Antiochus' death in late 164 BC. Chapters 10–12 must have been written between 167 and 164 BC. There is no evidence of a significant time lapse between those chapters and chapters 8 and 9, and chapter 7 may have been written just a few months earlier again.

Some evidence of the book's date can be found in the fact that Daniel is not present in the Hebrew Bible's Nevi'im (wherein it might arguably be expected to fit), which was closed c. 200 BC. Rather, Daniel forms a part of the Ketuvim ('Writings') also formed c. 200 BC. Additionally, the Wisdom of Sirach, a work dating from c. 180 BC, draws on almost every book of the Hebrew Bible except Daniel, leading scholars to suppose that its author was unaware of it, Daniel is, however, quoted in a section of the Sibylline Oracles commonly dated to the middle of the 2nd century BC, and was popular at Qumran at much the same time, suggesting that it was known from the middle of that century.

== Manuscripts ==
The Book of Daniel is preserved in the 12-chapter Masoretic Text and in two longer Greek versions, the original Septuagint version, c. 100 BC, and the later Theodotion version from c. 2nd century AD. Both Greek texts contain three additions to Daniel: The Prayer of Azariah and Song of the Three Holy Children; the story of Susannah and the Elders; and the story of Bel and the Dragon. Theodotion is much closer to the Masoretic Text and became so popular that it replaced the original Septuagint version in all but two manuscripts of the Septuagint itself. The Greek additions were apparently never part of the Hebrew text.

Eight copies of the Book of Daniel, all incomplete, have been found at Qumran, two in Cave 1, five in Cave 4, and one in Cave 6. Among them, they preserve text from eleven of Daniel's twelve chapters, and the twelfth is quoted in the Florilegium (a compilation scroll) 4Q174, showing that the book at Qumran did not lack this conclusion. All eight manuscripts were copied between 125 BC (4QDan^{c}) and about 50 AD (4QDan^{b}), showing that Daniel was being read at Qumran only about 40 years after its composition. All appear to preserve the 12-chapter Masoretic version rather than the longer Greek text. None reveal any major disagreements against the Masoretic, and the four scrolls that preserve the relevant sections (1QDan^{a}, 4QDan^{a}, 4QDan^{b}, and 4QDan^{d}) all follow the bilingual nature of Daniel where the book opens in Hebrew, switches to Aramaic at 2:4b, then reverts to Hebrew at 8:1.

A 2025 study published a series of radiocarbon tests which dated 4Q114, a manuscript preserving Daniel 8–11, to about 230–160 BC. This estimated date range overlaps with the period in which the final part of Daniel was presumably composed.

== Genre, meaning, symbolism and chronology ==
(This section deals with modern scholarly reconstructions of the meaning of Daniel to its original authors and audience)

=== Genre ===
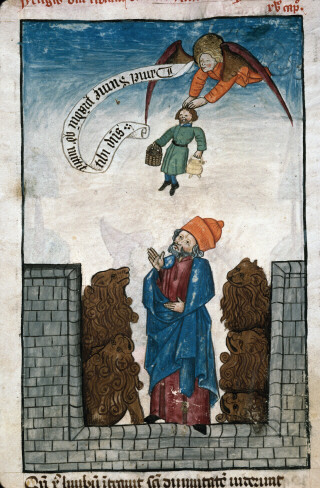
Daniel in the lions' den saved by Habakkuk (France, 15th century)

The Book of Daniel is an apocalypse, a literary genre in which a heavenly reality is revealed to a human recipient; such works are characterized by visions, symbolism, an other-worldly mediator, an emphasis on cosmic events, angels and demons, and pseudonymity (false authorship). Daniel also corresponds to the narratives of the promises and warnings by the prophets of the Hebrew Bible in that it doesn't predict fixed future events, nor a literal account of events before they take place, but rather illustrates imaginary scenarios of divine justice inspired by the scriptures. The production of apocalypses occurred commonly from 300 BC to 100 AD, not only among Jews and Christians, but also among Greeks, Romans, Persians and Egyptians, and Daniel is a representative apocalyptic seer, the recipient of divine revelation: he has learned the wisdom of the Babylonian magicians and surpassed them because his God is the true source of knowledge; he is one of the maskilim (משכלים), the wise ones, who have the task of teaching righteousness and whose number may be considered to include the authors of the book itself. The book is part of the broader genre of Jewish apocalyptic literature, in which God would liberate the righteous and restore the nation, though the way this would happen took many forms. It gives no real details of the end-time, but it seems that God's kingdom will be on this earth, that it will be governed by justice and righteousness, and that the tables will be turned on the Seleucids and those Jews who have cooperated with them.

=== Meaning, symbolism, and chronology ===
The message of the Book of Daniel is that, just as the God of Israel saved Daniel and his friends from their enemies, he would save all of Israel from their present oppression. The book is filled with monsters, angels, and numerology, drawn from a wide range of sources, both biblical and non-biblical, that would have had meaning in the context of 2nd-century Jewish culture and while Christian interpreters have always viewed these as predicting events in the New Testament—"the Son of God", "the Son of Man", Christ and the Antichrist—the book's intended audience is the Jews of the 2nd century BC. The following explains a few of these predictions as modern biblical scholars understand them.

- The four kingdoms and the little horn (Daniel 2 and 7): The concept of four successive world empires stems from Greek theories of mythological history. Most modern interpreters agree that the four represent Babylon, the Medes, Persia and the Greeks, ending with Hellenistic Seleucid Syria and with Hellenistic Ptolemaic Egypt, but traditional interpretation of the dream more commonly identifies the four empires as the Babylonian (the head), Medo-Persian (arms and shoulders), Greek (thighs and legs), and Roman (the feet) empires. The symbolism of four metals in the statue in chapter 2 comes from Persian writings, while the four "beasts from the sea" in chapter 7 reflect Hosea 13:7–8, in which God threatens that he will be to Israel like a lion, a leopard, a bear or a wild beast. The consensus among scholars is that the four beasts of chapter 7 symbolise the same four world empires. The modern interpretation views Antiochus IV (reigned 175–164 BC) as the "small horn" that uproots three others (Antiochus usurped the rights of several other claimants to become king of the Seleucid Empire).
- The Ancient of Days and the one like a son of man (Daniel 7): The portrayal of God in Daniel 7:13 resembles the portrayal of the Canaanite god El as an ancient divine king presiding over the divine court. The "Ancient of Days" gives dominion over the earth to "one like a son of man", and then in Daniel 7:27 to "the people of the holy ones of the Most High", whom scholars consider the son of man to represent. These people can be understood as the maskilim (sages), or as the Jewish people broadly. (Note: "Son of man" (bar 'enaš in Aramaic) simply means "a human being", but in the context of Daniel 7 it may be a heavenly figure, possibly the archangel Michael functioning as a representative of the Jewish people (Collins 1977:144–46; opposed by Davies 1985:105–106). Scholars almost universally agree that this human figure represents "the people of the holy ones of the Most High" of Daniel 7:27, originally the maskilim community or group responsible for the composition of Daniel, but in later interpretation, it is taken to mean the Jewish people as a whole. See Grabbe 2002.)
- The ram and he-goat (Daniel 8) as conventional astrological symbols represent Persia and Syria, as the text explains. The "mighty horn" stands for Alexander the Great (reigned 336–323 BC), and the "four lesser horns" represent the four principal generals (Diadochi) who fought over the Greek empire following Alexander's death. The "little horn" again represents Antiochus IV. The key to the symbols lies in the description of the little horn's actions: he ends the continual burnt offering and overthrows the Sanctuary, a clear reference to Antiochus' desecration of the Temple.
- The anointed ones and the seventy years (Chapter 9): Daniel reinterprets Jeremiah's "seventy years" prophecy regarding the period Israel would spend in bondage to Babylon. From the point of view of the Maccabean era, Jeremiah's promise was obviously not true—the Gentiles still oppressed the Jews, and the "desolation of Jerusalem" had not ended. Daniel, therefore, reinterprets the seventy years as seventy "weeks" of years, making up 490 years. The 70 weeks/490 years are subdivided, with seven "weeks" from the "going forth of the word to rebuild and restore Jerusalem" to the coming of an "anointed one", while the final "week" is marked by the violent death of another "anointed one", probably the High Priest Onias III (ousted to make way for Jason and murdered in 171 BC), and the profanation of the Temple. The point of this for Daniel is that the period of Gentile power is predetermined and is coming to an end.
- Kings of north and south: Chapters 10 to 12 concern the war between these kings, the events leading up to it, and its heavenly meaning. In chapter 10, the angel (Gabriel?) explains that there is currently a war in heaven between Michael, the angelic protector of Israel, and the "princes" (angels) of Persia and Greece; then, in chapter 11, he outlines the human wars which accompany this—the mythological concept sees standing behind every nation a god/angel who does battle on behalf of his people so that earthly events reflect what happens in heaven. The wars of the Ptolemies ("kings of the south") against the Seleucids ("kings of the north") are reviewed down to the career of Antiochus the Great (Antiochus III (reigned 222–187 BC), father of Antiochus IV), but the main focus is Antiochus IV, to whom more than half the chapter is devoted. The accuracy of these predictions lends credibility to the real prophecy with which the passage ends, the death of Antiochus—which, in the event, was not accurate.
- Predicting the end-time (Daniel 8:14 and 12:7–12): Biblical eschatology does not generally give precise information as to when the end will come, and Daniel's attempts to specify the number of days remaining is a rare exception. Daniel asks the angel how long the "little horn" will be triumphant, and the angel replies that the Temple will be reconsecrated after 2,300 "evenings and mornings" have passed (Daniel 8:14). The angel is counting the two daily sacrifices, so the period is 1,150 days from the desecration in December 167. In chapter 12, the angel gives three more dates: the desolation will last "for a time, times and half a time", or a year, two years, and a half a year (Daniel 12:8); then that the "desolation" will last for 1,290 days (12:11); and finally, 1,335 days (12:12). Verse 12:11 was presumably added after the lapse of the 1,150 days of chapter 8, and 12:12 after the lapse of the number in 12:11.

== Canonicity ==
Elements in Second-Temple Judaism apparently doubted the canonicity of the Book of Daniel. The work did not classify as a prophetic book in this milieu.

== Influence ==
The concepts of immortality and resurrection, with rewards for the righteous and punishment for the wicked, have roots much deeper than the Book of Daniel, but the earliest clear Biblical statement on these matters appears in the final chapter of that book: "Many of those who sleep in the dust of the earth shall awake, some to everlasting life, and some to everlasting shame and contempt." According to Daniel R. Schwartz, without the claim of the resurrection of Jesus, Christianity would have disappeared like the movements following other charismatic Jewish figures of the 1st century.

Porphyry of Tyre in his work Against the Christians, is recognized as the earliest source around the 3rd century AD to claim that Daniel was a much later work from a Jewish individual writing during the times of Antiochus. Porphyry's views are considered to be inline with scholarly agreement that Chapters 7-12 of Daniel were written during the Maccabean conflict.

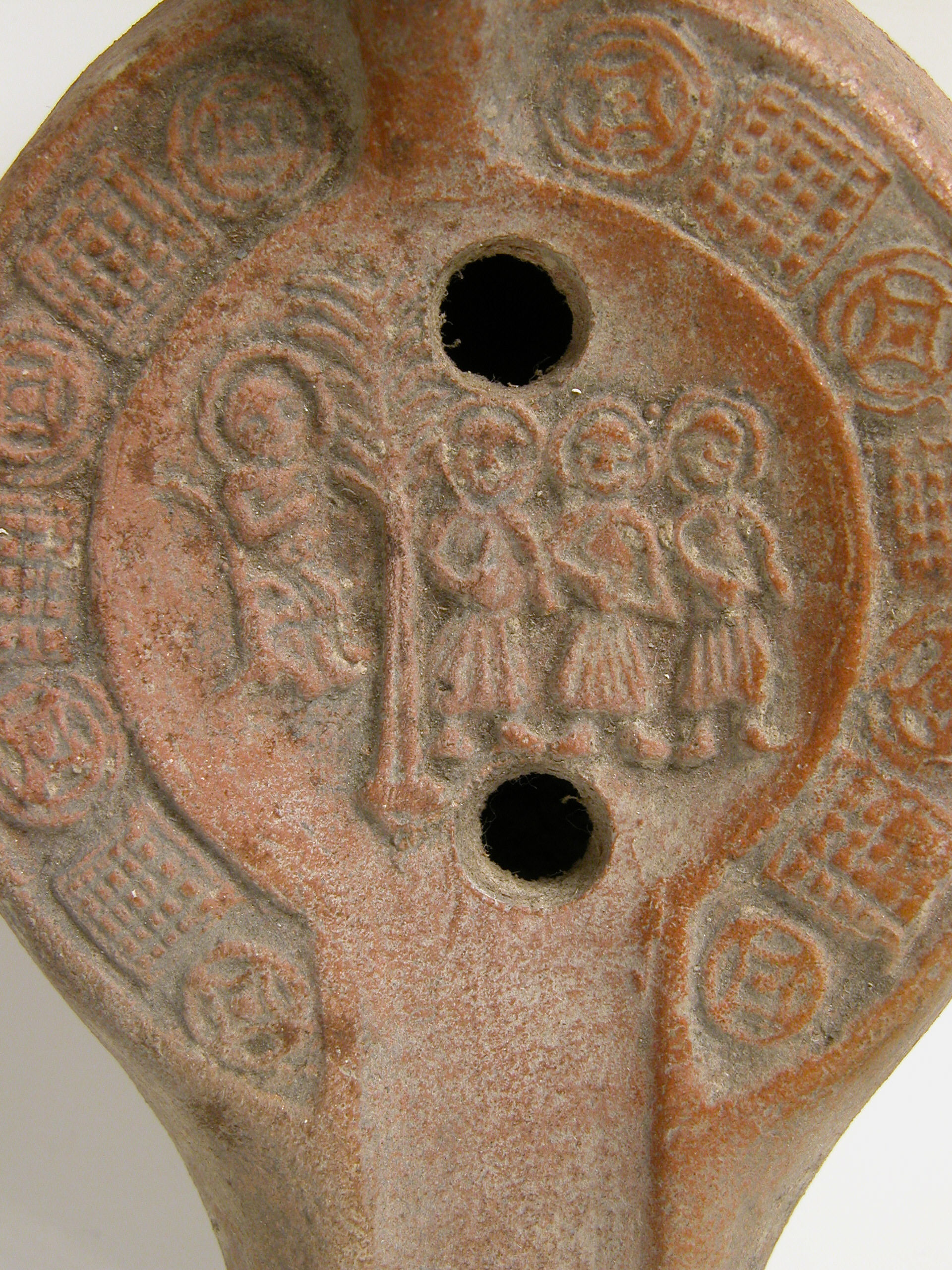
Lamp depicting the Three Hebrews before Nebuchadnezzar (Daniel 3:13–18), Tunisia, 5th–6th century CE

In the 1st century AD both Jews and Christians quoted and referenced the Book of Daniel as a prediction of the imminent end-time. Moments of national and cultural crisis continually reawakened the apocalyptic spirit, through the Montanists of the 2nd/3rd centuries, persecuted for their millennialism, to the more extreme elements of the 16th-century Reformation such as the Zwickau prophets and the Münster Rebellion. During the English Civil War, the Fifth Monarchy Men took their name and political program from Daniel 7, demanding that Oliver Cromwell allow them to form a "government of saints" in preparation for the coming of the Messiah; when Cromwell refused, they identified him instead as the Beast usurping the rightful place of King Jesus. For modern popularizers, the visions and revelations of Daniel remain a guide to the future, when the Antichrist will be destroyed by Jesus Christ at the Second Coming.

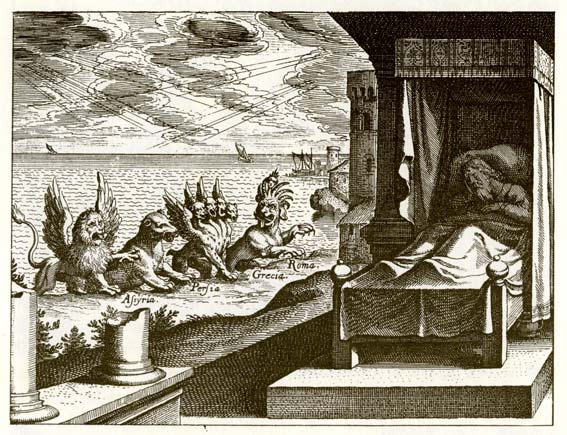
Engraving of Daniel's vision of the four beasts in chapter 7 by Matthäus Merian, 1630

The Book of Daniel belongs not only to Judeo-Christian and Islamic religious tradition but also to the wider Western intellectual and artistic heritage. It was easily the most popular of the prophetic books for the Anglo-Saxons, who nevertheless treated it not as prophecy but as a historical book, "a repository of dramatic stories about confrontations between God and a series of emperor-figures who represent the highest reach of man". Isaac Newton paid special attention to it, Francis Bacon borrowed a motto from it for his 1620 work Novum Organum, Baruch Spinoza drew on it, its apocalyptic second half attracted the attention of Carl Jung, and it has inspired musicians – from medieval liturgical drama to Darius Milhaud – and artists – including Michelangelo, Rembrandt and Eugène Delacroix.

== See also ==
- Biblical numerology
- Christian eschatology
- Danel
- Daniel (Old English poem)
- Greek Apocalypse of Daniel
- Historicist interpretations of the Book of Daniel

== Notes ==
Book of Daniel Major prophets
Preceded by Esther	Hebrew Bible	Succeeded by Ezra–Nehemiah
Preceded by Ezekiel	Christian; Old Testament	Succeeded by Hosea
