= Additions to Daniel =

Deuterocanonical chapters

The additions to Daniel are three chapters not found in the Hebrew/Aramaic text of Daniel. The text of these chapters is found in the Septuagint, the earliest extant Greek translation of the Hebrew Bible from the original Hebrew. They are included in Catholic, Eastern Orthodox, Oriental Orthodox, and Assyrian Church of the East bibles, as well as in the Apocrypha section of Evangelical-Lutheran and Anglican bibles.

The three chapters are as follows.

- The Prayer of Azariah and Song of the Three Holy Children: Daniel 3:24–90 (in the Greek Translation) are removed from the Protestant canon after verse 23 (v. 91 becomes v. 24), within the Fiery Furnace episode. When Shadrach, Meshach, and Abednego are thrown into a furnace for declining to worship an idol, they are rescued by an angel and sing a song of worship. In some Greek Bibles, the Prayer and the Song appear in an appendix to the book of Psalms.
- Susanna and the Elders: before Daniel 1:1, a prologue in early Greek manuscripts; chapter 13 in the Vulgate. This episode, along with Bel and the Dragon, is one of "the two earliest examples" of a detective story, according to Christopher Booker. In it, two corrupt judges attempt to coerce a young married woman into having adulterous sexual relations with them through blackmail, but are foiled under close questioning by Daniel.
- Bel and the Dragon: after Daniel 12:13 in Greek, an epilogue; chapter 14 in the Vulgate. Daniel's detective work reveals that a brass idol believed to miraculously consume sacrifices is in fact a front for a corrupt priesthood which is stealing the offerings.

The Book of Daniel is preserved in the 12-chapter Masoretic Text and in two longer Greek versions: the original Septuagint version, c. 100 BCE, and the later Theodotion version from c. 2nd century CE. Both Greek texts contain the three additions to Daniel. The Masoretic text does not. In other respects Theodotion is much closer to the Masoretic Text, and became so popular that it replaced the original Septuagint version in all but two manuscripts of the Septuagint itself. The Greek additions were apparently never part of the Hebrew text. Several Old Greek texts of the Book of Daniel have been discovered, and the original form of the book is being reconstructed.

== See also ==
- Deuterocanonical books
