= Bel and the Dragon =

Deuterocanonical text

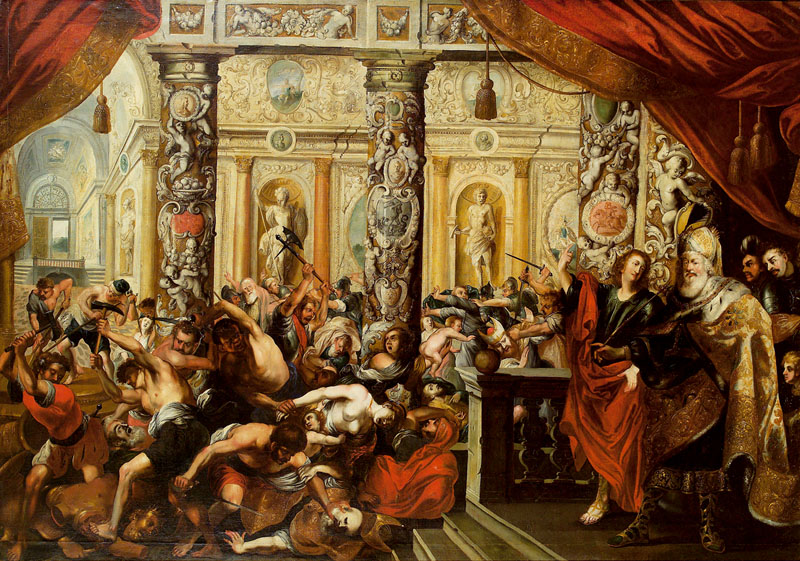
Stephan Kessler's Daniel and King Cyrus in Bel's Temple

The narrative of Bel and the Dragon is incorporated as chapter 14 of the extended Book of Daniel. The original Septuagint text in Greek survives in a single manuscript, Codex Chisianus, while the standard text is due to Theodotion, the 2nd-century AD revisor.

This chapter, along with chapter 13, is considered deuterocanonical: it was unknown to early Rabbinic Judaism, and while it is considered non-canonical by most Protestants, It is included in Catholic, Eastern Orthodox, Oriental Orthodox, and Assyrian Church of the East bibles, and is found in the Apocrypha section of some Protestant Bibles.

It was "perhaps composed as early as the Persian period (539–333 BCE)".

== Summaries ==
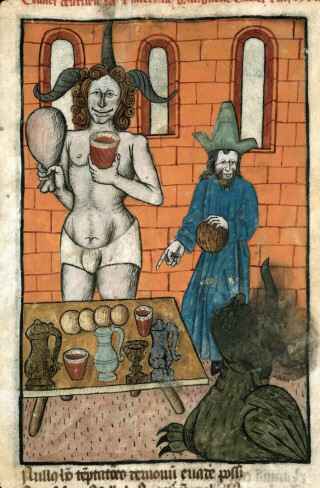
Daniel, Bel and the Dragon (France, 15th century)

The chapter contains a single story which may previously have represented three separate narratives, which place Daniel at the court of Cyrus, king of the Persians: "When King Astyages was laid to rest with his ancestors, Cyrus the Persian succeeded to his kingdom." There Daniel "was a companion of the king, and was the most honored of all his Friends". However, while Theodotion's Greek apparently dates the story to the time of Astyages, the Old Greek versions of the story do not specify this. As such, the real identity of the king is up for debate. Some Bibles, such as the Douay-Rheims, use the more traditional identification of this king as being Evil-Merodach, or Amel-Marduk. This identification is supported by the Scriptural Research Institute in their book Septuagint: Daniel, where they cited similarities between Amel-Marduk's reign and the account, namely that Amel-Marduk was the only king of Babylon to have seen religious riots during his reign.

=== Bel ===
The narrative of Bel (Daniel 14:1–22) ridicules the worship of idols. The king asks Daniel, "You do not think Bel is a living god? Do you not see how much he eats and drinks every day?" to which Daniel answers that the idol is made of clay covered by bronze and thus cannot eat or drink. Enraged, the king then demands that the seventy priests of Bel show him who consumes the offerings made to the idol. The priests then challenge the king to set the offerings as usual (which were "twelve great measures of fine flour, and forty sheep, and six vessels of wine") and then seal the entrance to the temple with his ring: if Bel does not consume the offerings, the priests are to be sentenced to death; otherwise, Daniel is to be killed.

Daniel then uncovers the ruse (by scattering ashes over the floor of the temple in the presence of the king after the priests have left) and shows that the "sacred" meal of Bel is actually consumed at night by the priests and their wives and children, who enter through a secret door when the temple's doors are sealed.

The next morning, the king comes to inspect the test by observing from above. He sees that the food has been consumed and points out that the wax seals he put on the temple doors are unbroken, and offers a hosanna to Bel. Daniel calls attention to the footprints on the temple floor; which the king then realizes by seeing footprints, along with more slender ones and smaller ones, shows that women and children also participated in the gluttony. The priests of Bel are then arrested and, confessing their deed, reveal the secret passage that they used to sneak inside the temple. They, their wives and children are put to death, and Daniel is permitted to destroy the idol of Bel and the temple. This version has been cited as an ancestor of the "locked-room mystery".

=== The dragon ===
According to the brief companion narrative of the dragon (Daniel 14:23–30), "there was a great dragon which the Babylonians revered". Some time after the temple's condemnation the Babylonians worship the dragon. The king says that, unlike Bel, the dragon is a clear example of a live animal. Daniel promises to slay the dragon without the aid of a sword, and does so by baking pitch, fat, and hair (trichas) to make cakes (mazas, barley-cakes) that cause the dragon to burst open upon consumption. In other variants, other ingredients serve the purpose: in a form known to the Midrash, the dragon was fed straw in which nails were hidden, or camel skins filled with hot coals. A similar story occurs in the Persian poet Ferdowsi's Shahnameh, where Alexander the Great, or "Iskandar", kills a dragon by feeding it cow hides stuffed with poison and tar.

Earlier scholarship has suggested a parallel between this text and the contest between Marduk and Tiamat in Mesopotamian mythology, where the winds controlled by Marduk burst Tiamat open and barley-cake plays the same role as the wind. However, David DeSilva (2018) casts doubt on this reading.

== See also ==
- Susanna (Book of Daniel)
