= Prayer of Azariah and Song of the Three Holy Children =

Passage after Daniel 3:23 in some translations of the Bible

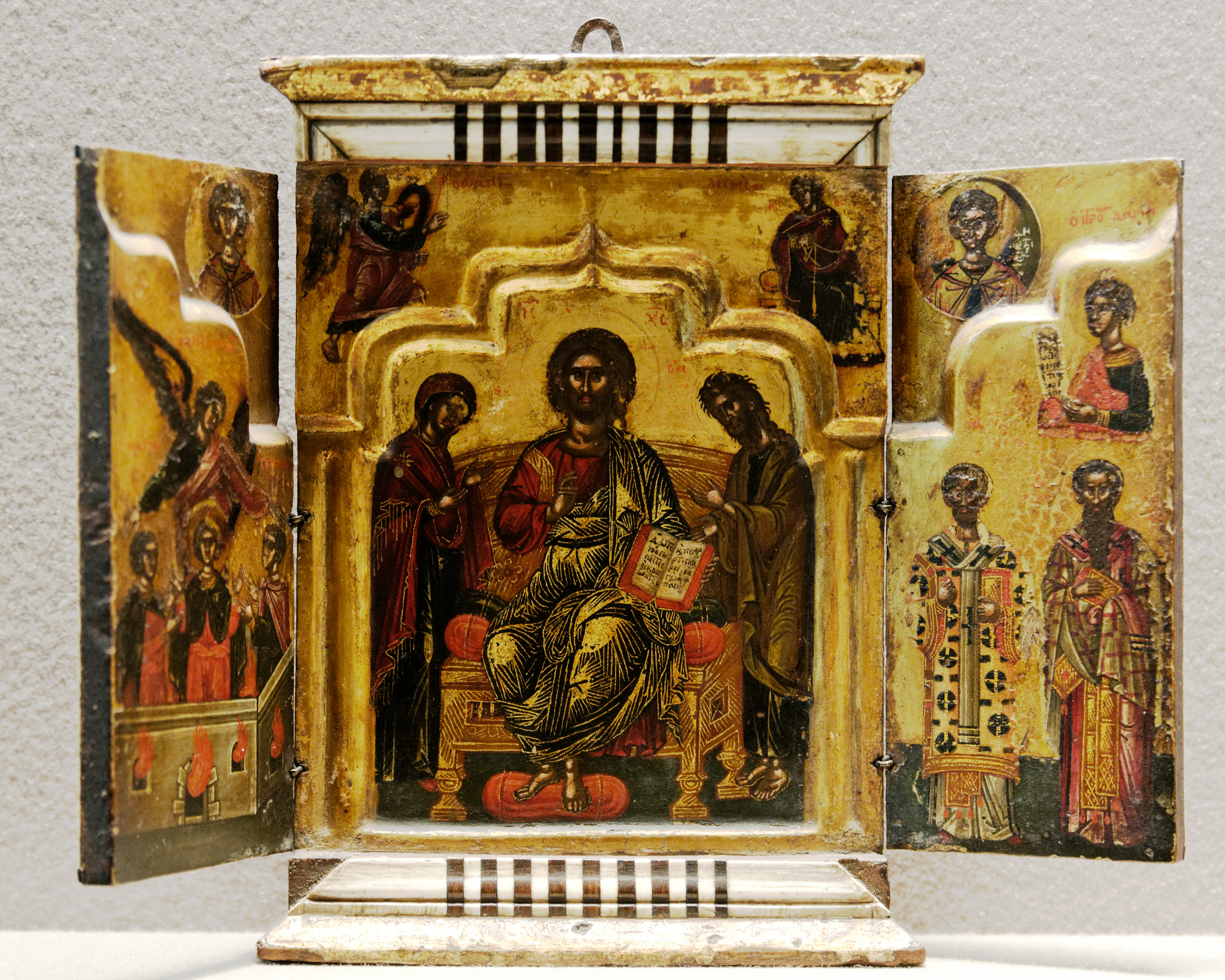
Greek triptych c. 1550, with the Three Holy Children in the left panel

The Prayer of Azariah and Song of the Three Holy Children, abbreviated Pr Azar, appears after Daniel 3:23 in some translations of the Bible, including the ancient Greek Septuagint translation. The passage is accepted by some Christian denominations as canonical, part of the Deuterocanonical books. In the Revised Standard Version and the English Standard Version (Anglican edition), this text is included as part of the Apocrypha, and titled "The Prayer of Azariah and the Song of the Three Young Men".

The passage includes three main components. The first is the penitential prayer of Daniel's friend Azariah (called Abednego in Babylonian, according to Daniel 1:6–7) while the three youths were in the fiery furnace. The second component is a brief account of a radiant figure who met them in the furnace yet who was unburned. The third component is the hymn of praise they sang when they realized their deliverance. The hymn includes the refrain, "Praise and exalt Him above all forever...", repeated many times, each naming a feature of the world.

== Texts and origin ==
External audio
- Singing in Russian Orthodox Church

The Prayer and accompanying Song are not found in the Hebrew and Aramaic text of the Book of Daniel, nor are they cited in any extant early Jewish writings.

The origins of these writings are obscure. Whether the accounts were originally composed in Hebrew (or Aramaic) or in Greek is uncertain, although many modern scholars conclude on the basis of textual evidence that there was probably an original Semitic edition. The date of composition of these documents is also uncertain, although many scholars favor a date either in the second or first century BC.

== Canonicity ==
It is accepted as canonical scripture by Catholic, Eastern Orthodox, Oriental Orthodox, and Assyrian Church of the East Christians, but rejected by most Protestants. The passage is included in 80-book Protestant Bibles in the section of the Apocrypha, however. To this end, Article VI of the Thirty-Nine Articles of the Church of England has it listed as non-canonical (but still, with the other Apocryphal texts, "the Church doth read for example of life and instruction of manners"). The Belgic Confession of the Reformed Churches teaches that "The church may certainly read these [Apocryphal] books and learn from them as far as they agree with the canonical books."

== See also ==
- Nebuchadnezzar II
- Additions to Daniel
- Benedicite
