= Old Greek =

Old Greek is the Greek language as spoken from Late Antiquity (c. 400 AD) to c. 1500. Greek spoken during this period is usually split into:

- Late Greek (c. 400 – c. 800 AD)
- Medieval Greek (c. 800 – c. 1500)

"Old Greek" (OG) is also the technical term for the presumed initial Greek translations of the Hebrew Bible for books other than the Pentateuch.

Old Greek might also be understood to include a preceding period, Koine Greek, as well – also referred to as "the common dialect" or "Hellenistic Greek" – the universal dialect spoken throughout post-Classical antiquity (c. 300 BC – 300 AD).

== See also ==
- Mycenaean Greek language, also referred to as "Old Greek"
- Ancient Greek
- Proto-Greek
