= Giant Bible of Saint Maximin =

Frontispiece from folio 5v: Jerome's prologue to the Pentateuch

The Giant Bible of Saint Maximin is an illustrated giant bible that was made in the abbey of Saint Maximin in Trier in the late 11th century. Today, it is kept in the National Library of Luxembourg as manuscript MS 1000.

== Physical description ==
The Giant Bible of Saint Maximin weighs 25 kilograms (55 lb) and measures 80 by 55 centimetres (31 in × 22 in) in width by height when open. It is made of parchment from the hides of 230 cattle. It contains 438 folios.

The writing is mainly Caroline minuscule, although the starting and ending of books sometimes use Roman square capitals and uncial script. The main text is in black ink, with red ink used for chapter headings and for dialogue indicators in the Song of Songs. Many pages have running titles in black ink. The biblical text can be divided into five sections: the Octateuch; the Books of the Kingdoms; the prophetic books; the sapiential books, hagiographical books and Maccabees; and the New Testament. It does not include the gospels, which indicates that it was intended for use in a church which already possessed an evangeliary.

Red, blue, green, yellow, purple and grey inks are used in the bible's decoration. Initials are generally decorated with interlaced foliage. There is a distinct lack of figural ornamentation. There are two frontispieces at folios 1v and 5v. The latter contains the title of Jerome's prologue to the Pentateuch in a style reminiscent of the earlier Codex Aureus of Echternach.

== History ==
The giant bible was produced in the last quarter of the 11th century at its namesake monastery of Saint Maximin in Trier. It contains liturgy and prayers distinctive of Saint Maximin, as well as a copy of a document of Pope Leo VII excommunicating the monastery's enemies. It is slightly later than the comparable Giant Bible of Echternach, produced at its sister house of Echternach. It is mostly the work of a single scribe, although a total of 15 hands can be found at work in it through occasional additions that were made down to the 16th century.

The provenance of the bible is very well known. It is probably one of the two bibliothece maiores perfecte ("over-sized bibles, with full text") listed in a catalogue of Saint Maximin's book collection from around 1125. It was kept in the abbey church and was used for readings on special occasions.

In the first quarter of the 16th century, it was rebound in wood boards clad in pigskin. This was probably its third binding. The binder was Otto Nauticus. Most of the pages were trimmed at this time. A few that had gone missing were replaced. In the second half of the 16th century, it was removed from the church and placed in the abbey library, where it was catalogued by Nicolas Petreius.

When the library was reorganized around 1593, the pressmark N 204 was added to the second folio. Charles Eugene, Duke of Württemberg (r. 1737–1793), tried to buy the bible for 300 gold ducats but was turned down. Sometime between 1802, when Saint Maximin was secularized, and 1823, the manuscript was acquired by Leander van Ess, who added his pressmark to the spine.

In 1825–1826, the bible was bought by Thomas Phillips, who added his pressmark, Phillipps 400, to the first folio. In 1946, the Phillips family sold it to Lionel and Philip Robinson, who immediately auctioned it via Sotheby's on 1 July 1946. The purchaser, Philip M. Chancellor, gave it in 1955 to a family in Mexico or Central America, who in turn sold it via Sotheby's on 6 December 1983. At the same auction, the Gospels of Henry the Lion sold for the highest price ever paid for a book. The giant bible was bought by Henri Schiller.

Schiller sold the bible to Sam Fogg (2003), who sold it to Paul Ruddock (2007), who sold it to the Idda Collection in Switzerland (2008). It was finally sold for €4.5 million through Les Enluminures to the National Library of Luxembourg, who announced the acquisition on 5 November 2024. Its new pressmark is MS 1000.
