= Helisachar =

Helisachar (died between 837 and 840) was a churchman and statesman in the Carolingian Empire. He served as the chancellor of Aquitaine from 808 to 814 and archchancellor of the empire from 814 until 819. He remained an influential figure at court into the 830s and was entrusted with military responsibilities in 824 and 827. He was rewarded with multiple abbacies and composed an antiphonary.

== Life ==
Helisachar was a Goth originally from Septimania. He may have begun his career as a notary. He is first recorded as the chancellor of King Louis the Pious of Aquitaine in April 808. When Louis succeeded his father as emperor in 814, Helisachar accompanied him to Aachen and became archchancellor of the empire, an office in which he continued until at least August 819. According to Amalarius, he was "first among the first" in Louis's palace. According to Ermold the Black, Louis granted Helisachar the abbey of Saint-Aubin in the summer of 818. Although he was a canon at the time, he was not a monk.

Helisachar remained an influential figure at court after 819. He was a friend of Benedict of Aniane, whom he visited on his deathbed in 821. In 822, Archbishop Agobard of Lyon addressed two letters to Helisachar requesting him to bring a matter before the emperor. He later acquired the abbacy of a second house, the abbey of Saint-Riquier, perhaps in 822. He may also have become abbot of Jumièges, according to a tradition recorded by Hariulf of Oudenburg in his Chronicon Centulense, and abbot of Sankt Maximin in Trier.

Helisachar participated in the military campaign in Brittany in the autumn of 824 with the contingent of King Pippin I of Aquitaine. In 827, according to the Astronomer, he was one of the leaders of the preliminary campaign against the rebel Aizo in the Marca Hispanica. During this time, he and Count Oliba I of Carcassonne determined the boundaries of the monastery of Notre-Dame-sur-Orbieu. According to Thegan of Trier, Helisachar was one of those who tried to persuade Louis the Pious to abdicate in 830.

Although Nithard presents Helisachar as out of favour until 833, Louis sent him on a justicial mission to the Breton March in the autumn of 830. He was unaffected by the political crisis of 833–834, when Louis was temporarily deposed by his son Lothair I. After his restoration, Louis sent Helisachar as missus to Maine, fulfilling a request of Bishop Aldric of Le Mans. In June 835, he ordered the emperor's vassal to restore lands taken from the cathedral of Le Mans.

Helisachar was alive as late as 837. The date of his death is unknown, but he died before Louis the Pious, who died on 20 June 840.

== Works ==
Freculf of Lisieux dedicated the first volume of his universal chronicle to Helisachar, whom he praises in a letter for his "insatiable love of wisdom". Helisachar's surviving writings are a preface to the epistolary of Alcuin and a letter to Nimfridius, written probably at Angers between 819 and 822.

In his letter to Nimfridius, Helisachar refers to his work on an antiphonary for the officium intended to reconcile the competing Roman and Frankish usages. This work is also referred to by Amalarius. The antiphonary of Helisachar is a lost work.

Helisachar may have written the Latin sermon Legimus in ecclesiasticis historiis for All Saints' Day. There are competing attributions. In the Giant Bible of Echternach, now manuscript 264 of the National Library of Luxembourg, it is attributed to Helisachar.

It has been argued that the entries for the years 820–829 in the Royal Frankish Annals were composed by Helisachar and Hilduin of Saint-Denis.

== Bibliography ==
- Cross, James E. (1977). "Legimus in ecclesiasticis historiis: A Sermon for All Saints, and its Use in Old English Prose". Traditio. 33: 101–135.
- Depreux, Philippe (1997). Prosopographie de l'entourage de Louis le Pieux (781–840) (PDF). Sigmaringen: Jan Thorbecke.
- Malbos, Lina (1966). "L'annaliste royal sous Louis le Pieux". Le Moyen Âge. 72: 225–234.
- McKinnon, James W. (2001). "Helisachar [Elisagarus]". Grove Music Online. Oxford University Press.
- McKitterick, Rosamond (1983). The Frankish Kingdoms under the Carolingians, 751–987. London: Longman.
- Noble, T. F. X., ed. (2009). Charlemagne and Louis the Pious: The Lives by Einhard, Notker, Ermoldus, Thegan and the Astronomer. Pennsylvania State University Press.
