= Maximiner Riesenbibel =

The Maximiner Riesenbibel ('Maximin Giant Bible') is an illustrated giant bible in three volumes that was made in the abbey of Saint Maximin in Trier in the early 16th century. It is privately owned but is on permanent loan to the Trier Cathedral Treasury, where it is on display.

The Riesenbibel was begun during the abbacy of Thomas de Huisdem (r. 1502–1514) by the monk Vincent de Cochem and completed in 1526 or 1527 by the monk Jacob Gladbach. The parchment of the manuscript and the calligraphy are of the highest quality. The work required the purchase of nearly 1,000 hides. The continued production of deluxe manuscript bibles after the introduction of the printing press may have been a deliberate act of resistance to the new technology by the Bursfelde Congregation.

The Riesenbibel contains the earliest copy of the Historia Excidii Sancti Maximini, an historical account of the background and aftermath of the sack of Saint Maximin in 1522.
