= Giant bible =

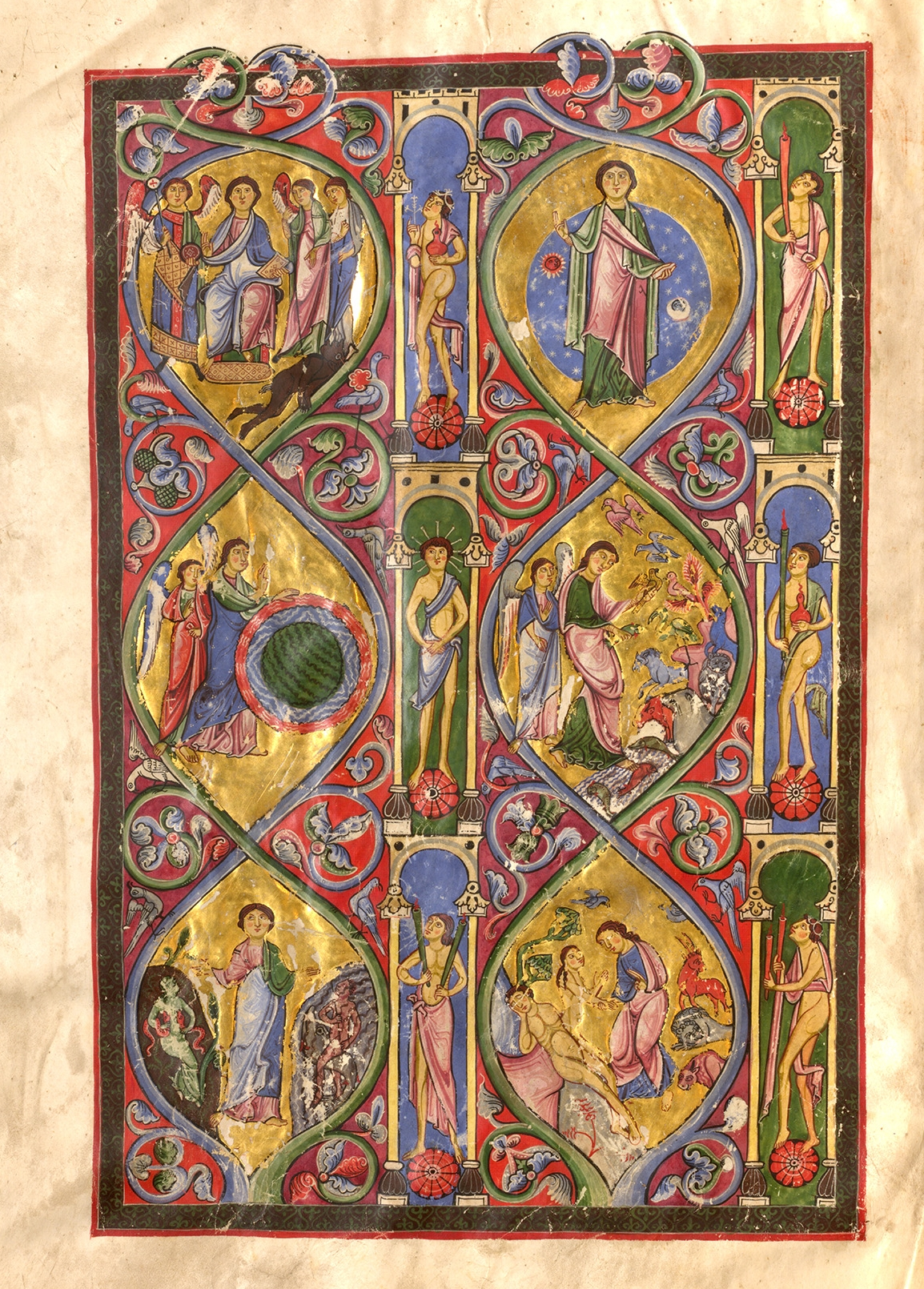
A page from the Gumbertus Bible

Giant bibles, sometimes called lectern bibles, were large-format copies of the Bible in single or multiple volumes. Often illustrated, they were usually produced in monastic scriptoria. The golden age of their production was the Romanesque period (11th and 12th centuries) and they are generally associated with the Gregorian Reform and other monastic reforms. There were two main traditions, one originating in the archdiocese of Reims in northern France and another originating in central Italy. Examples of the latter tradition are known as the Atlantic bibles. Many subsequent giant bibles from northern Europe were inspired by the Atlantic bibles.

== Reims bibles ==
The giant bibles of the archdiocese of Reims appeared earliest. They are associated with the Gorze Reform introduced to the monasteries of his diocese by Archbishop Adalbero of Reims (r. 969–989). The production of giant bibles often followed the reforms introduced by Richard of Saint-Vanne, Poppo of Stavelot and Gerard of Florennes. The Lobbes Bible was produced after Richard's reform of Lobbes Abbey in 1020. Poppo's reforms produced giant bibles at Stavelot (Stavelot Bible), Liège and Echternach (Giant Bible of Echternach). Another one of the earliest giant bibles is the Saint-Vaast Bible, produced around 1025 under Richard's disciple, Leduin. This bible lacks the Psalms and Gospels, presumably because the abbey already possessed a psalter and an evangeliary. In the generation after Adalbero, giant bibles appear at the monasteries of Saint-Thierry and Saint-Remi and at Reims Cathedral.

Two giant bibles were produced at Grande Chartreuse, whose founder, Bruno, had come from Reims one before 1132 and another around 1170.

== Atlantic bibles ==
A special subset of giant bibles is that of the Atlantic bibles made in Italy. The term "Atlantic bible" comes from the Italian bibbia atlantica (plural bibbie atlantiche), coined by Pietro Toesca in 1929. It is a reference to the mythical giant Atlas. In English, they have often been called the Italian Giant Bibles, which goes back to the German term Riesenbibel, coined by Georg Swarzenski in 1913.

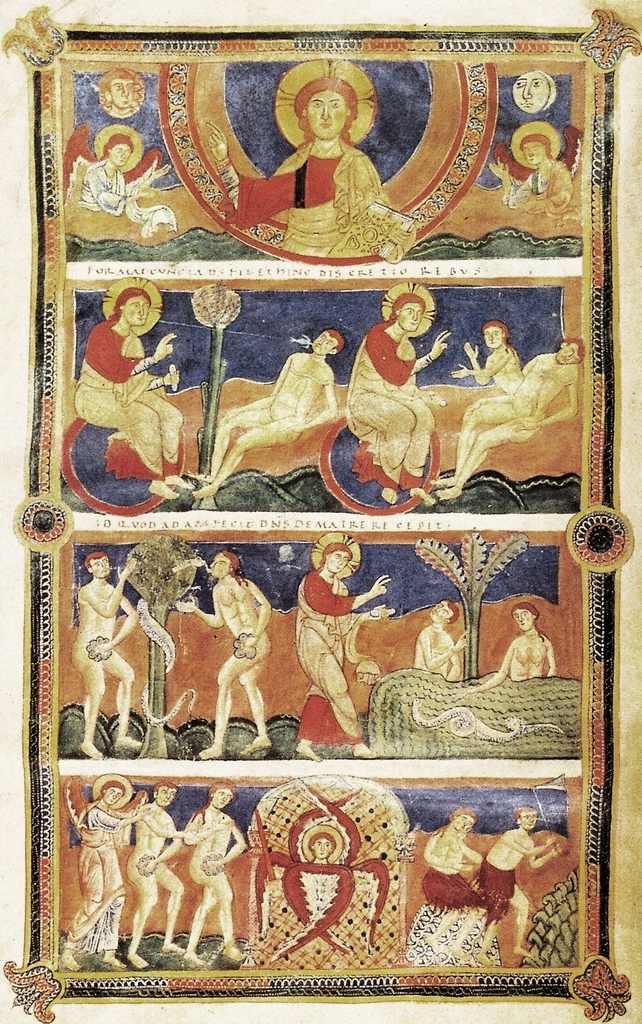
Scenes from Genesis in the Pantheon Bible, an Umbro-Roman Atlantic bible

There are 118 known Atlantic bibles, of which 99 are complete and the rest fragmentary. There were two zones of production in central Italy, consequently the bibles are generally classified as either 'Umbro-Roman' or 'Tuscan'. The bibles first appear in the 1050s. The period of production lasted until the early 12th century.

The Atlantic bibles are pandects, that is, they contain the entire text of the Latin Vulgate. They contain between 329 and 518 leaves (equal to 658–1036 pages). Some examples are divided into two volumes. The dimensions of a typical Atlantic bible are 300–400 millimetres (12–16 in) wide by 500–600 millimetres (20–24 in) tall. They are at a minimum 100 millimetres (3.9 in) thick. They were made of parchment, mainly sourced from sheep and goats. The typical Atlantic bible required the slaughter of 165–260 animals.

The text and layout of the Atlantic bibles are standardised. The text is written in Caroline minuscule. All Atlantic bibles have the main text in two columns with standard margins. The average number of lines per page is 55 and the average line height is 7.8 millimetres (0.31 in). As a result, only about half of the available parchment surface contains writing. Each book typically begins with a decorative initial. The typical order of contents of an Atlantic bible was:

- Octateuch
- Kingdoms
- Prophetic books
- Psalms
- Books of Wisdom
- Paralipomenon
- Job
- Tobias
- Judith
- Esther
- Esdras
- Books of the Maccabees
- New Testament

This was the preferred order of Jerome, with the prophets immediately after the books of Kings. The version of the Psalms is the Gallicanum.

The Atlantic bibles were intended for public reading in the choir, where they were put on permanent display, or among the brothers in the refectory. They were often acquired or commissioned for use as gifts. Emperor Henry IV gave one to the abbey of Hirsau, while his Italian rival, Countess Matilda of Tuscany, gave one to the abbey of Polirone. Bishop William II of Troia distributed 29 bibles to the churches of his diocese between 1107 and 1137. The bishops of Geneva and Sion commissioned copies.

Where the Atlantic bibles were imitated outside of central Italy, the revisions to the text were generally not adopted.

== See also ==
- Codex Gigas

== Bibliography ==
- Ayres, Larry M. (1994). "The Italian Giant Bibles: Aspects of their Touronian Ancestry and Early History". In Richard Gameson (ed.). The Early Medieval Bible: Its Production, Decoration and Use. Cambridge University Press. pp. 125–154.
- De Hamel, Christopher (2001). The Book: A History of the Bible. Phaidon Press.
- Dinkova-Bruun, Greti (2017). "Review of Les Bibles Atlantiques". Revue d'Histoire Ecclésiastique. 112 (3–4): 868–870.
- Houghton, H. A. G. (2016). The Latin New Testament: A Guide to Its Early History, Texts, and Manuscripts. Oxford University Press.
- Lobrichon, Guy (2023). "The Production of Medieval Bibles". In H. A. G. Houghton (ed.). The Oxford Handbook of the Latin Bible. pp. 187–207.
- Maniaci, Marilena; Orofino, Giulia, eds. (2000). Le Bibbie atlantiche: Il Libro delle Scritture tra monumentalità e rappresentazione. Catalogo della mostra. Milan.
- Maniaci, Marilena (2018). "Written Evidence in the Italian Giant Bibles: Around and Beyond the Sacred Text". In Liv Ingeborg Lied; Marilena Maniaci (eds.). Bible as Notepad: Tracing Annotations and Annotation Practices in Late Antique and Medieval Biblical Manuscripts. De Gruyter. pp. 85–100.
- Maniaci, Marilena (2022). "The Structure of Atlantic Bibles". In Marilena Maniaci (ed.). Trends in Statistical Codicology. De Gruyter. pp. 35–63.
- Reilly, Diane J. (2002). "French Romanesque Giant Bibles and Their English Relatives: Blood Relatives or Adopted Children?". Scriptorium. 56 (2): 294–311.
- Reilly, Diane J. (2006). The Art of Reform in Eleventh-Century Flanders: Gerard of Cambrai, Richard of Saint-Vanne and the Saint-Vaast Bible. Brill.
- Reilly, Diane J. (2013). "The Bible as Bellwether: Manuscript Bibles in the Context of Spiritual, Liturgical and Educational Reform, 1000–1200". In Eyal Poleg; Laura Light (eds.). Form and Function in the Late Medieval Bible. Brill. pp. 9–29.
- Togni, Nadia, ed. (2016). Les Bibles Atlantiques: Le manuscrit biblique à l'époque de la réforme de l'église du XI^{e} siècle. SISMEL.
- Yawn, Lila (2010). "The Italian Giant Bible, Lay Patronage and Professional Workmanship (11th–12th Centuries)". Cahiers électroniques d'histoire textuelle du Lamop. 3.
