= Giant Bible of Echternach =

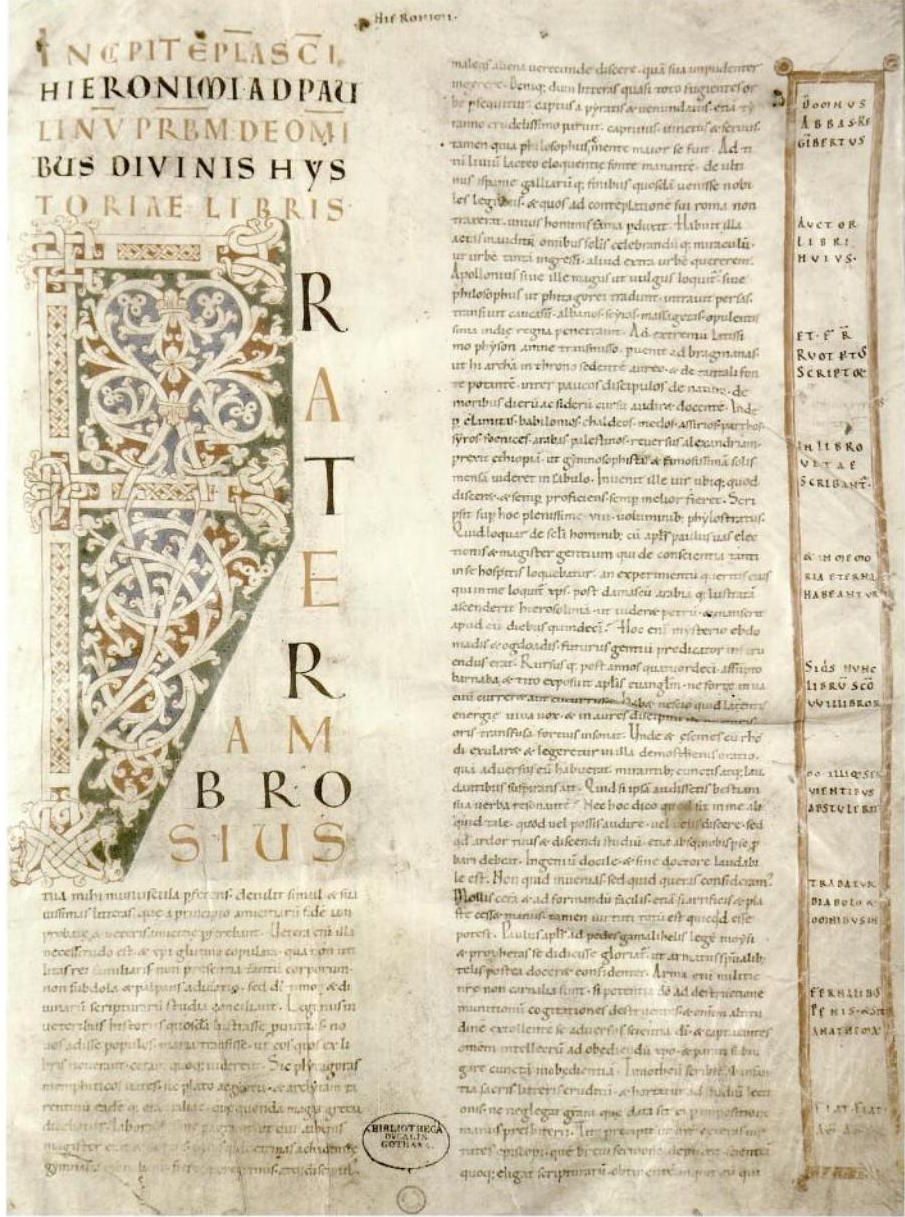
Opening page. The red box on the right contains information on the bible's production.

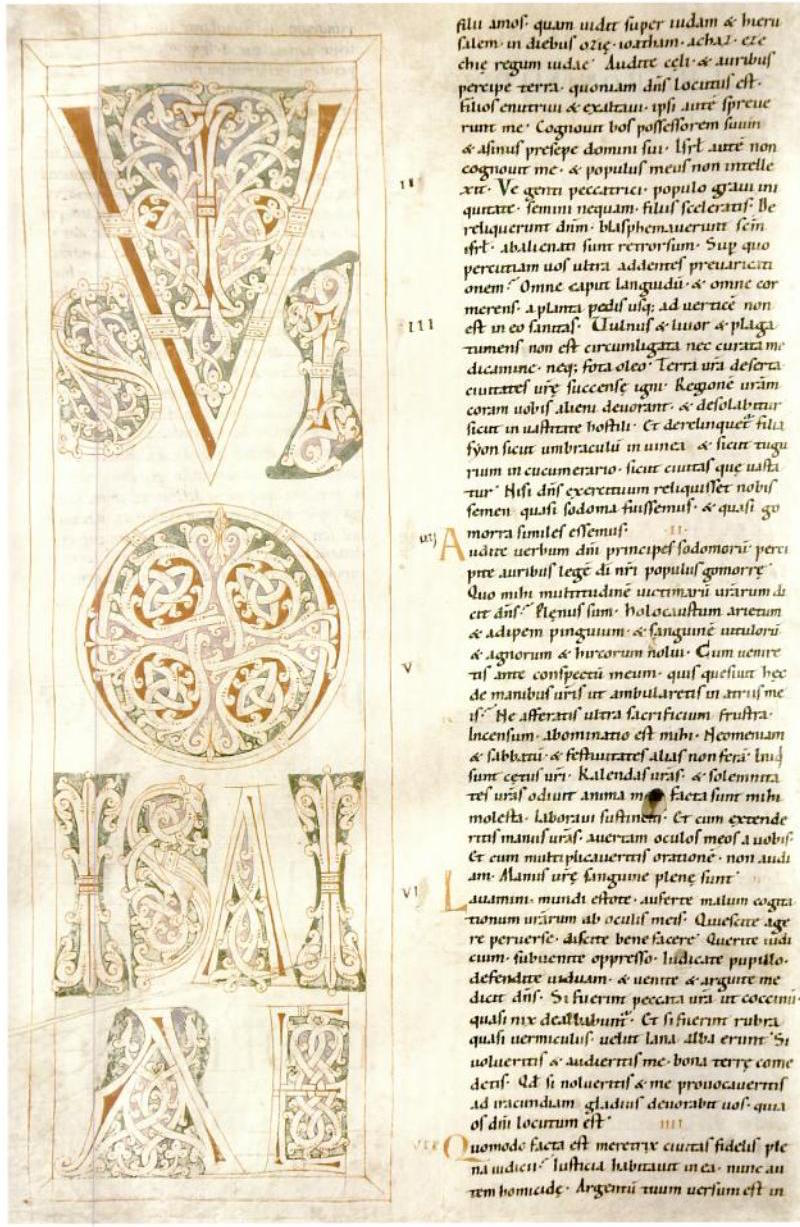
Start of the Book of Isaiah

The Giant Bible of Echternach is an illustrated giant bible that was made for Abbot Regimbert of the abbey of Echternach between 1051 and 1081. Today, it is kept in the National Library of Luxembourg as manuscript MS 264. Prior to its acquisition by Luxembourg in 1951, it was in the Ducal Library of Gotha.

The bible contains 414 folios measuring 600 by 400 millimetres (24 in × 16 in). Three folios are missing. The written area of the page is 480 by 300 millimetres (19 in × 12 in). The writing, in two columns, is by a single hand. The scribe was a monk of Echternach named Ruotpert who left no other known work. Large decorated initials in red, green and purple with extensive interlace are found at the start of each biblical book and smaller ones elsewhere. The bible is bound in hardwood covered in calfskin. In its size and decoration, it was a major influence on the Giant Bible of Saint Maximin.

In 1940, the bible was unbound in order to be photographed and then rebound. The original parchment pastedown was set aside, only to be identified in 2001 as an abacus board of the kind introduced by Gerbert of Aurillac (died 1003). It was probably copied much earlier than the bible, since it was considered scrap by the time the bible was bound.

Besides the bible, the manuscript includes a Latin sermon, Legimus in ecclesiasticis historiis, which it attributes to Helisachar.
