= Freculf =

Frankish ecclesiastic, diplomat and historian (d. 850/852)

Freculf (Latin: Freculphus Lexoviensis, "Freculf of Lisieux"; died 8 October 850 or 852), a Frankish ecclesiastic, diplomat and historian, was a pupil of the palace school of Aachen during the reign of Charlemagne and Bishop of Lisieux from about 824 until his death. He is now best remembered for his universal chronicle, the Twelve Books of Histories (Historiarum libri XII), which is a source of information about the conversion of Gaul and the history of the Franks. Chronicles such as that of Freculf attempted to show world history from Creation to the present, while most history writing in the eighth and ninth centuries was considerably more local and specific.

== Early life ==
Freculf's origins are unknown, but it is known that he became a bishop in either 823 or 825 until his death on 8 October 850 or 852. He was a pupil of Louis the Pious' chancellor Helisachar and was involved in various issues of the time, including the question of image veneration. Tom Noble described him as a 'busy, well-connected man'.

== Envoy to the Pope ==
Freculf was sent by Louis to Rome to negotiate with Pope Eugene II about the veneration of images in 824. This issue was one of the main points of contention in the Church at the time. The East Roman Emperor at the time, Michael II, was initially tolerant towards those who venerated images (see Iconoclasm). However, later on in his reign he started persecuting all those who worshiped these images. However, the Franks allowed for veneration, although not adoration, of images. He asked Louis the Pious to persuade Pope Eugene II to ban veneration. Louis complied and one of the envoys he sent was Freculf. However, this Frankish embassy failed as Eugene II stated that the second Council of Nicaea had already decided that images can be venerated but should not be adored.

== Twelve Histories ==
One of Freculf's most important works was his Twelve Books of Histories in two volumes. When he wrote the second part around 830, 'he dedicated it to Empress Judith as a gift for her son Charles [the Bald]'. He hoped that this book would 'enable princes to take precautions against disadvantages to themselves and to their subjects'. In a letter to Empress Judith of Bavaria, Freculf flatters the empress while at the same time claiming that her son Charles was so like Charlemagne that 'his grandfather seems not to have died, but rather with the fog of sleep wiped away, to illumine the world anew, indeed his immortal wit, elegance and virtue shine in the grandson together with the name.' Empress Judith encouraged this comparison of Charles to Charlemagne, something that he would be reminded of throughout his reign. However, the influence of Charlemagne was to go way beyond the reign of Charles the Bald. Freculf also mentioned in his book that he hoped Charles would be 'our king of a new age'. Freculf also sent Charles the Bald a copy of the military treatise De re militari by Vegetius.

Freculf's work, along with Ado of Vienne's chronicle, are the only examples of chronicles encompassing world history until the late twelfth century. Part One of the book narrates the history from the creation of the world to the birth of Jesus Christ. The second part consisted of the history from incarnation of Jesus up until around 600AD. Freculf did not use the customary ages-of-the-world or chronological models for organizing his material. Instead he traced history through the fall and rise of potentates, realms, and cults through pagan, pre-Roman antiquity, and then through Israel. His work was centered mainly on religious aspects, such as the Visigothic conversion to Catholicism, admiration of Pope Gregory I as a 'defender of the faith', all the martyrs, and all six ecumenical councils up until that point. According to Michael Allen, Freculf's work, 'often neglected due to its lack of new factual information of contemporary events...crafted a history meant to address present concerns through the 'mirror' of the past".

Freculf's decision to end his history in the seventh century, rather than bringing it to his time, has been interpreted as evidence for a new sense of historical consciousness, and that the Franks saw themselves as post-Roman. According to Tom Noble, Freculf's view was that:

The Romans had been expelled from Italy and the last great monument to Rome's state cults had been transformed. It was Roman, however, but Roman ecclesiastical. Gregory I marked the way and even the Greeks acknowledged that Rome was the head of all churches. It was Catholic. The future of the West was safely in the hands of Catholic Franks and Lombards, the Visigoths had rejected heresy, and the English were on the way to conversion, What is more, the faith itself had been definitively defined.

However, Graeme Ward has argued that Freculf simply ended his work at the point when the victory of Christianity was assured, rather than making any point about historical epochs.

== Manuscripts ==
Manuscripts of his chronicle include:

- "Auxerre - BM - ms. 0091". Origin (Pontigny Abbey Notre-Dame)
- "Avranches - BM - ms. 0160". Origin (Mont-Saint-Michel)

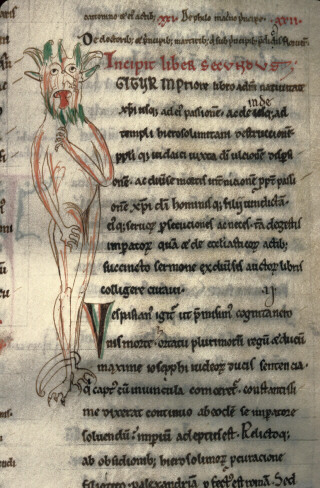

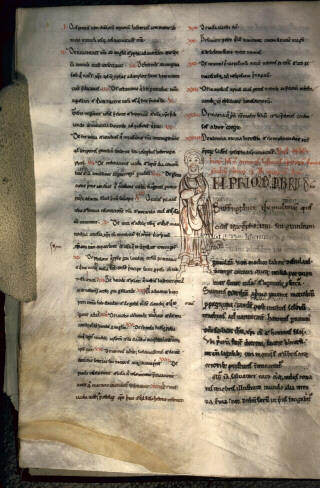

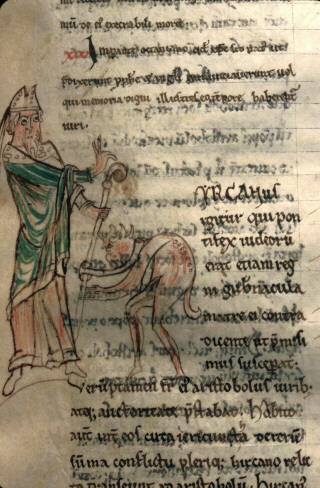

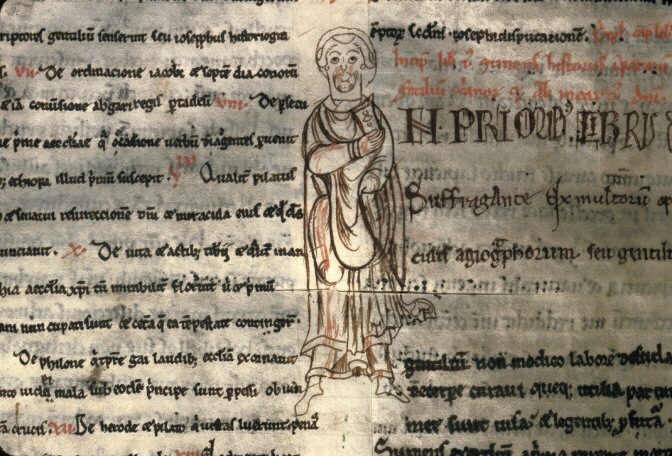

== Literature ==
- Natumewicz, C. F. "Freculphus of Lisieux, His Chronicle and a Mont Saint-Michel Manuscript." Horae Eruditae et Codices sancti Michaelis de periculo maris, 90–134. Steenbrugge: 1966. HS 90-1800 Multiple authors: MICHAUD-QUANTIN P., CORDOLIANI A., MATHIEU M., JEAUNEAU E., NATUNEWICZ Ch.-F., PREAUX J. & SCHNEYER J.B.

- Frechulfi Lexouiensis episcopi Opera omnia. Ed. Michael I. Allen. 2 vols. (1. Prolegomena – Indices; 2. Textus). Corpus Christianorum, Continuatio Mediaeualis 169–169A. Turnhout: Brepols, 2002.
