= Old Testament =

First division of the Christian Bible

Old Testament Part of the Bible

Information
- Religion: Christianity
- Books: 46 (Catholic), up to 49 (Orthodox), 39 (Protestant)
- It overlaps with the Hebrew Bible and the Septuagint

The Old Testament (OT) is the first division of the Christian Bible. It is based primarily upon the 24 books of the Hebrew Bible, or the Tanakh, a collection of ancient religious Hebrew and occasionally Aramaic writings by the Israelites, but differs from the Jewish canon in order, textual tradition, and, in some Christian traditions, contents. The second division of the Christian Bible is the New Testament, written in Koine Greek.

The Old Testament consists of many distinct books by various authors produced over a period of centuries. Christians traditionally divide the Old Testament into four sections: the Pentateuch or the first five books (which corresponds to the Jewish Torah); the Historical books telling the history of the Israelites, from their conquest of Canaan to their defeat and exile in Babylon; the Poetic Books, which explore themes of human experience, morality, and divine justice; and the Prophetic books, warning of the consequences of turning away from God.

The Old Testament canon differs among Christian denominations. The Catholic canon contains 46, the Eastern Orthodox and Oriental Orthodox Churches include up to 49 books, and the Protestant Bible typically has 39. Some books found in Christian Old Testament, but not in the Hebrew canon, are called deuterocanonical books, mostly originating from the Septuagint, an ancient Greek translation of the Hebrew Bible. Catholic and Orthodox churches include these, while most Protestant Bibles exclude them, though some Anglican and Lutheran versions place them in a separate section called Apocrypha.

Because the term "Old Testament" is used within Christianity, the same texts may be interpreted differently in Christian and Jewish traditions. Christian interpretation has often read passages of the Old Testament in light of the New Testament, while Jewish interpretation does not treat these writings as part of an "old" covenant superseded by a New Testament.

While early histories of the ancient Israel and Judah were largely based on biblical accounts, their reliability has been increasingly questioned over time. Key debates have focused on the historicity of the Patriarchs, the Exodus, the Israelite conquest, and the United Monarchy, with archaeological evidence often challenging these narratives. Mainstream scholarship generally takes a skeptical but balanced approach to historical material from the 9th century BC onward; some chronologically later biblical traditions align with archaeological findings.

== Content ==
The Old Testament contains 39 (Protestant), 46 (Catholic), or more (Orthodox and other) books, divided, very broadly, into the Pentateuch (Torah), the historical books, the "wisdom" books and the prophets.

The table reflects Christian canonical arrangements of these texts; the Jewish Tanakh uses a different order and does not include the deuterocanonical books recognized in Catholic and Orthodox Old Testaments. The table below uses the spellings and names present in modern editions of the Christian Bible, such as the Catholic New American Bible Revised Edition and the Protestant Revised Standard Version and English Standard Version. The spelling and names in both the 1609–10 Douay Old Testament (and in the 1582 Rheims New Testament) and the 1749 revision by Bishop Challoner (the edition currently in print used by many Catholics, and the source of traditional Catholic spellings in English) and in the Septuagint differ from those spellings and names used in modern editions which are derived from the Hebrew Masoretic Text. (Note: Generally due to derivation from transliterations of names used in the Latin Vulgate in the case of Catholicism, and from transliterations of the Greek Septuagint in the case of the Orthodox (as opposed to the derivation of translations, instead of transliterations, of Hebrew titles) such Ecclesiasticus (DRC) instead of Sirach (LXX) or Ben Sira (Hebrew), Paralipomenon (Greek, meaning "things omitted") instead of Chronicles, Sophonias instead of Zephaniah, Noe instead of Noah, Henoch instead of Enoch, Messias instead of Messiah, Sion instead of Zion, etc.)

For the Orthodox canon, Septuagint titles are provided in parentheses when these differ from those editions. For the Catholic canon, the Douaic titles are provided in parentheses when these differ from those editions. Likewise, the King James Version references some of these books by the traditional spelling when referring to them in the New Testament, such as "Esaias" (for Isaiah).

In the spirit of ecumenism, more recent Catholic translations (e.g. the New American Bible, Jerusalem Bible, and ecumenical translations used by Catholics, such as the Revised Standard Version Catholic Edition) use the same "standardized" (King James Version) spellings and names as Protestant Bibles (e.g. 1 Chronicles as opposed to the Douaic 1 Paralipomenon, 1–2 Samuel and 1–2 Kings instead of 1–4 Kings) in those books which are universally considered canonical: the protocanonicals.

The Talmud (the Jewish commentary on the scriptures) in Bava Batra 14b gives a different order for the books in Nevi'im and Ketuvim. This order is also cited in Mishneh Torah Hilchot Sefer Torah 7:15. The order of the books of the Torah is universal through all denominations of Judaism and Christianity.

The disputed books, included in most canons but not in others, are often called the Biblical apocrypha, a term that is sometimes used specifically to describe the books in the Catholic and Orthodox canons that are absent from the Jewish Masoretic Text and most modern Protestant Bibles. Catholics, following the Canon of Trent (1546), describe these books as deuterocanonical, while Greek Orthodox Christians, following the Synod of Jerusalem (1672), use the traditional name of anagignoskomena, meaning "that which is to be read." They are present in a few historic Protestant versions; the German Luther Bible included such books, as did the English 1611 King James Version. (Note: The foundational Thirty-Nine Articles of Anglicanism, in Article VI, asserts these disputed books are not used "to establish any doctrine", but "read for example of life." Although the Biblical Apocrypha are still used in Anglican Liturgy, the modern trend is to not even print the Old Testament Apocrypha in editions of Anglican-used Bibles)

=== Table ===
This table lists seventy-four books and additions.

				Judaism	Samaritanism	Western Christian tradition				Eastern Orthodox tradition			Oriental Orthodox tradition				
Hebrew order	Christian order	Books	Language	Hebrew Bible	Samaritan Pentateuch	Latin Catholicism	Anglican	Lutheran	Free Churches and Other Protestants	Greek Orthodox	Russian Orthodox	Georgian Orthodox	Armenian Apostolic	Coptic Orthodox	Syriac Orthodox	Ethiopian Orthodox Tewahedo	Church of the East
					Torah			Pentateuch									
1	1	Genesis	Hebrew	Yes	Yes	Yes	Yes	Yes	Yes	Yes	Yes	Yes	Yes	Yes	Yes	Yes	Yes
2	2	Exodus	Hebrew	Yes	Yes	Yes	Yes	Yes	Yes	Yes	Yes	Yes	Yes	Yes	Yes	Yes	Yes
3	3	Leviticus	Hebrew	Yes	Yes	Yes	Yes	Yes	Yes	Yes	Yes	Yes	Yes	Yes	Yes	Yes	Yes
4	4	Numbers	Hebrew	Yes	Yes	Yes	Yes	Yes	Yes	Yes	Yes	Yes	Yes	Yes	Yes	Yes	Yes
5	5	Deuteronomy	Hebrew	Yes	Yes	Yes	Yes	Yes	Yes	Yes	Yes	Yes	Yes	Yes	Yes	Yes	Yes
				Nevi'im Rishonim		Historical books											
6	6	Joshua	Hebrew	Yes	No	Yes; Josue	Yes	Yes	Yes	Yes	Yes	Yes	Yes	Yes	Yes	Yes	Yes
		Samaritan Book of Joshua	Arabic	No	No (elevated status)	No	No	No	No	No	No	No	No	No	No	No	No
7	7	Judges	Hebrew	Yes	No	Yes	Yes	Yes	Yes	Yes	Yes	Yes	Yes	Yes	Yes	Yes	Yes
18	8	Ruth	Hebrew	Yes (part of Ketuvim)	No	Yes	Yes	Yes	Yes	Yes	Yes	Yes	Yes	Yes	Yes	Yes	Yes
8	9 and 10	1 and 2 Samuel	Hebrew	Yes	No	Yes; 1 and 2 Kings	Yes	Yes	Yes	Yes; 1 and 2 Kingdoms	Yes; 1 and 2 Kingdoms	Yes; 1 and 2 Kingdoms	Yes; 1 and 2 Kingdoms	Yes	Yes	Yes	Yes
9	11 and 12	1 and 2 Kings	Hebrew	Yes	No	Yes; 3 and 4 Kings	Yes	Yes	Yes	Yes; 3 and 4 Kingdoms	Yes; 3 and 4 Kingdoms	Yes; 3 and 4 Kingdoms	Yes; 3 and 4 Kingdoms	Yes	Yes	Yes	Yes
24	13 and 14	1 and 2 Chronicles	Hebrew	Yes (part of Ketuvim)	No	Yes; 1 and 2 Paralipomenon	Yes	Yes	Yes	Yes; 1 and 2 Paralipomenon	Yes; 1 and 2 Paralipomenon	Yes; 1 and 2 Paralipomenon	Yes	Yes	Yes	Yes	Yes
	28	Prayer of Manasseh	Greek (majority view) or Semitic (minority view)	No	No	No – (inc. in Appendix in Clementine Vulgate)	No (Apocrypha)	No (Apocrypha)	No (Apocrypha)	No (part of Odes)	Yes (part of 2 Paralipomenon)	Yes (part of 2 Paralipomenon)	Yes	Yes	No (?) (Liturgical)	Yes (part of 2 Chronicles)	No (?) (Liturgical)
23	16	Ezra (1 Ezra)	Hebrew and Aramaic	Yes (part of Ketuvim)	No	Yes; 1 Esdras	Yes	Yes	Yes	Yes; Esdras B'	Yes; 1 Esdras	Yes; 1 Ezra	Yes	Yes	Yes	Yes	Yes
23	17	Nehemiah (2 Ezra)	Hebrew	Yes (part of Ketuvim)	No	Yes; 2 Esdras	Yes	Yes	Yes	Yes; Esdras Γ' or Neemias	Yes; Neemias	Yes; Neemias	Yes	Yes	Yes	Yes	Yes
		1 Esdras (3 Ezra)	Aramaic and Hebrew (majority view)	No	No	No – (inc. in Appendix in Clementine Vulgate as 3 Esdras.)	No; 1 Esdras (Apocrypha)	No	No (Apocrypha)	Yes; Esdras A'	Yes; 2 Esdras	Yes; 2 Ezra	Yes	No – inc. in some mss.	No – inc. in some mss.	Yes; Ezra Kali	No – inc. in some mss.
		2 Esdras 3–14 (4 Ezra or Apocalypsis of Esdras)	Hebrew (lost) with Latin additions	No	No	No – (inc in Appendix in Clementine Vulgate as 4 Esdras.)	No; 2 Esdras (Apocrypha)	No	No (Apocrypha)	No (Greek ms. lost)	Yes; 3 Esdras	Yes; 3 Ezra – inc. as noncanonical	No – inc. in some mss	No – inc. in some mss.	No – inc. in some mss.	Yes; Ezra Sutu'el	Yes (?)
		2 Esdras 1–2; 15–16 (5 and 6 Ezra or Apocalypsis of Esdras)	Hebrew (lost)	No	No	No – (inc. in Appendix in Clementine Vulgate as 4 Esdras.)	No (part of 2 Esdras apocryphon)	No	No (Apocrypha)	No (Greek ms.)	Yes; 3 Esdras	Yes; 3 Ezra – inc. as noncanonical	No	No	No	No	No
21	20	Esther	Hebrew	Yes (part of Ketuvim)	No	Yes	Yes	Yes	Yes	Yes	Yes	Yes	Yes	Yes	Yes	Yes	Yes
	varies	Additions to Esther	Greek	No	No	Yes (Deuterocanonical)	No (Apocrypha)	No (Apocrypha)	No (Apocrypha)	Yes	Yes	Yes	Yes	Yes	Yes	Yes	Yes
	18	Tobit	Aramaic and Hebrew	No	No	Yes; Tobias (Deuterocanonical)	No (Apocrypha)	No (Apocrypha)	No (Apocrypha)	Yes	Yes	Yes	Yes	Yes	Yes	Yes	Yes
	19	Judith	Hebrew	No	No	Yes (Deuterocanonical)	No (Apocrypha)	No (Apocrypha)	No (Apocrypha)	Yes	Yes	Yes	Yes	Yes	Yes	Yes	Yes
		1 Maccabees	Hebrew (lost), Greek (surviving)	No	No	Yes; 1 Machabees (Deuterocanonical)	No (Apocrypha)	No (Apocrypha)	No (Apocrypha	Yes	Yes	Yes	Yes	Yes	Yes	No	Yes
		2 Maccabees	Greek	No	No	Yes; 2 Machabees (Deuterocanonical)	No (Apocrypha)	No (Apocrypha)	No (Apocrypha)	Yes	Yes	Yes	Yes	Yes	Yes	No	Yes
		3 Maccabees	Greek	No	No	No	No	No	No (Apocrypha)	Yes	Yes	Yes	Yes	No	Yes (?)	No	Yes (?)
		4 Maccabees	Greek	No	No	No	No	No	No (Apocrypha)	No (appendix)	No	Yes – inc. as noncanonical	No (early tradition)	No (Coptic ms.)	No – inc. in some mss.	No	Yes (?)
		1 Ethiopic Maccabees (1 Meqabyan)	Geʽez	No	No	No	No	No	No	No	No	No	No	No	No	Yes	No
		2 and 3 Ethiopic Maccabees (2 and 3 Meqabyan)	Geʽez	No	No	No	No	No	No	No	No	No	No	No	No	Yes	No
		1 Enoch	Aramaic or Hebrew	No	No	No	No	No	No	No	No	No	No	No	No	Yes	No
		2 Enoch	Greek (lost), possibly Semitic original	No	No	No	No	No	No	No	No	No	No	No	No	No	No
		3 Enoch	Hebrew with Latin and Greek words	No	No	No	No	No	No	No	No	No	No	No	No	No	No
		Jubilees	Hebrew	No	No	No	No	No	No	No	No	No	No	No	No	Yes	No
		Ethiopic Pseudo-Josephus (Zëna Ayhud)	Hebrew	No	No	No	No	No	No	No	No	No	No	No	No	Yes (broader canon)	No
		Josephus' Jewish War VI	Aramaic or Hebrew (lost)	No	No	No	No	No	No	No	No	No	No	No	No – inc. in some mss.	No	Yes (?)
		Testaments of the Twelve Patriarchs	Hebrew or Greek	No	No	No	No	No	No	No (Greek ms.)	No	No	No – inc. in some mss.	No	No	No	No
		Joseph and Asenath	Greek?	No	No	No	No	No	No	No	No (Slavonic ms.)	No	No – inc. in some mss.	No	No – (early tradition)	No (early tradition?)	Yes (?)
				Ketuvim		Wisdom literature											
16	26	Job	Hebrew	Yes; Iyov	No	Yes	Yes	Yes	Yes	Yes	Yes	Yes	Yes	Yes	Yes	Yes	Yes
	26	Additions to Job	Hebrew	No	No	No	No	No	No	Yes	Yes	No (?)	Yes	No	No	Yes (?)	No
14	27	Psalms 1–150	Hebrew	Yes; Tehillim	No	Yes	Yes	Yes	Yes	Yes	Yes	Yes	Yes	Yes	Yes	Yes	Yes
	27	Psalm 151	Hebrew	No	No	No – inc. in some mss.	No	No	No (Apocrypha)	Yes	Yes	Yes	Yes	Yes	Yes	Yes	Yes
		Psalms 152–155	Hebrew	No	No	No	No	No	No	No	No	No	No	No	No (?) – inc. in some mss.	No	No (?) – inc. in some mss.
		Psalms of Solomon	Hebrew or Aramaic (lost)	No	No	No	No	No	No	No – inc. in some mss.	No	No	No	No	No – inc. in some mss.	No	No – inc. in some mss.
15	29	Proverbs	Hebrew	Yes; Mishlei	No	Yes	Yes	Yes	Yes	Yes	Yes	Yes	Yes	Yes	Yes	Yes (in 2 books); Messale (Prov. 1-24) and Tägsas (Prov. 25-31)	Yes
20	30	Ecclesiastes	Hebrew	Yes; Qohelet	No	Yes	Yes	Yes	Yes	Yes	Yes	Yes	Yes	Yes	Yes	Yes	Yes
17	31	Song of Songs (Song of Solomon)	Hebrew	Yes; Shir HaShirim	No	Yes; Canticle of Canticles	Yes	Yes	Yes	Yes; Aisma Aismaton	Yes; Aisma Aismaton	Yes; Aisma Aismaton	Yes	Yes	Yes	Yes	Yes
	32	Wisdom or Wisdom of Solomon	Greek	No	No	Yes (Deuterocanonical)	No (Apocrypha)	No (Apocrypha)	No (Apocrypha)	Yes	Yes	Yes	Yes	Yes	Yes	Yes	Yes
	33	Wisdom of Sirach or Sirach (1–51)	Hebrew	No	No	Yes; Ecclesiasticus (Deuterocanonical)	No (Apocrypha)	No (Apocrypha)	No (Apocrypha)	Yes	Yes	Yes	Yes	Yes	Yes	Yes	Yes
		Prayer of Solomon (Sirach 52)		No	No	No – inc. in some mss.	No	No	No	No	No	No	No	No	No	No	No
				Nevi'im Akharonim		Prophets											
10	34	Isaiah	Hebrew	Yes; Yeshayahu	No	Yes; Isaias	Yes	Yes	Yes	Yes	Yes	Yes	Yes	Yes	Yes	Yes	Yes
		Ascension of Isaiah		No	No	No	No	No	No	No	No	No	No – liturgical (?)	No	No	No – Ethiopic mss. (early tradition?)	No
10	34	Jeremiah	Hebrew	Yes; Yirmeyahu	No	Yes; Jeremias	Yes	Yes	Yes	Yes	Yes	Yes	Yes	Yes	Yes	Yes	Yes
19	36	Lamentations (1–5)	Hebrew	Yes; Eikha (part of Ketuvim)	No	Yes	Yes	Yes	Yes	Yes	Yes	Yes	Yes	Yes	Yes	Yes (part of Säqoqawä Eremyas)	Yes
	37	Baruch	Hebrew	No	No	Yes (Deuterocanonical)	No (Apocrypha)	No (Apocrypha)	No (Apocrypha)	Yes	Yes	Yes	Yes	Yes	Yes; 2 Baruch	Yes	Yes
	38	Letter of Jeremiah	Greek (majority view) or Hebrew (minority view)	No	No	Yes (chapter 6 of Baruch) (Deuterocanonical)	No (Apocrypha)	No (Apocrypha)	No (Apocrypha)	Yes	Yes	Yes	Yes	Yes	Yes	Yes (part of Säqoqawä Eremyas)	Yes
		Syriac Apocalypse of Baruch (2 Baruch 1–77)	Hebrew (lost)	No	No	No	No	No	No	No	No	No	No	No	No – inc. in some mss.	No	Yes (?)
		Letter of Baruch (2 Baruch 78–86)	Hebrew (lost)	No	No	No	No	No	No	No	No	No	No	No	Yes; 1 Baruch	No	Yes (?)
		Greek Apocalypse of Baruch (3 Baruch)	Greek (disputed)	No	No	No	No	No	No	No (Greek ms.)	No (Slavonic ms.)	No	No	No	No	No	No
		4 Baruch		No	No	No	No	No	No	No	No	No	No	No	No	Yes (part of Säqoqawä Eremyas)	No
12	39	Ezekiel	Hebrew	Yes; Yekhezqel	No	Yes; Ezechiel	Yes	Yes	Yes	Yes	Yes	Yes	Yes	Yes	Yes	Yes	Yes
22	40	Daniel	Aramaic and Hebrew	Yes (part of Ketuvim)	No	Yes	Yes	Yes	Yes	Yes	Yes	Yes	Yes	Yes	Yes	Yes	Yes
	40	Additions to Daniel	Greek	No	No	Yes (Deuterocanonical)	No (Apocrypha)	No (Apocrypha)	No (Apocrypha)	Yes	Yes	Yes	Yes	Yes	Yes	Yes	Yes
		Syriac Apocalypse of Daniel (Dani'il z'ura)		No	No	No	No	No	No	No	No	No	No	No	No – inc. in some mss.	No	Yes (?)
13	41	Hosea	Hebrew	Yes (Trei Asar)	No	Yes; Osee	Yes	Yes	Yes	Yes	Yes	Yes	Yes	Yes	Yes	Yes	Yes
13	42	Joel	Hebrew	Yes (Trei Asar)	No	Yes	Yes	Yes	Yes	Yes	Yes	Yes	Yes	Yes	Yes	Yes	Yes
13	43	Amos	Hebrew	Yes (Trei Asar)	No	Yes	Yes	Yes	Yes	Yes	Yes	Yes	Yes	Yes	Yes	Yes	Yes
13	44	Obadiah	Hebrew	Yes (Trei Asar)	No	Yes; Abdias	Yes	Yes	Yes	Yes	Yes	Yes	Yes	Yes	Yes	Yes	Yes
13	45	Jonah	Hebrew	Yes (Trei Asar)	No	Yes; Jonas	Yes	Yes	Yes	Yes	Yes	Yes	Yes	Yes	Yes	Yes	Yes
13	46	Micah	Hebrew	Yes (Trei Asar)	No	Yes; Micheas	Yes	Yes	Yes	Yes	Yes	Yes	Yes	Yes	Yes	Yes	Yes
13	47	Nahum	Hebrew	Yes (Trei Asar)	No	Yes	Yes	Yes	Yes	Yes	Yes	Yes	Yes	Yes	Yes	Yes	Yes
13	48	Habakkuk	Hebrew	Yes (Trei Asar)	No	Yes; Habacuc	Yes	Yes	Yes	Yes	Yes	Yes	Yes	Yes	Yes	Yes	Yes
13	49	Zephaniah	Hebrew	Yes (Trei Asar)	No	Yes; Sophonias	Yes	Yes	Yes	Yes	Yes	Yes	Yes	Yes	Yes	Yes	Yes
13	50	Haggai	Hebrew	Yes (Trei Asar)	No	Yes; Aggeus	Yes	Yes	Yes	Yes	Yes	Yes	Yes	Yes	Yes	Yes	Yes
13	51	Zechariah	Hebrew	Yes (Trei Asar)	No	Yes; Zacharias	Yes	Yes	Yes	Yes	Yes	Yes	Yes	Yes	Yes	Yes	Yes
13	52	Malachi	Hebrew	Yes (Trei Asar)	No	Yes; Malachias	Yes	Yes	Yes	Yes	Yes	Yes	Yes	Yes	Yes	Yes	Yes

== Historicity ==
=== Early scholarship ===
Some of the stories of the Pentateuch may derive from older sources. Scholars such as Andrew R. George point out the similarity between the Genesis flood narrative and the Gilgamesh flood myth. (Note: The latter flood myth appears in a Babylonian copy dating to 700 BC, though many scholars believe that this was probably copied from the Akkadian: Atra-Hasis, which dates to the 18th century BC. George points out that the modern version of the Epic of Gilgamesh was compiled by Sîn-lēqi-unninni, who lived sometime between 1300 and 1000 BC.) Similarities between the origin story of Moses and that of Sargon of Akkad were noted by psychoanalyst Otto Rank in 1909 and popularized by 20th-century writers, such as H. G. Wells and Joseph Campbell. Jacob Bronowski writes that "the Bible is ... part folklore and part record. History is ... written by the victors, and the Israelis, when they burst through [Jericho (c. 1400 BC)], became the carriers of history."

=== Recent scholarship ===
In 2007, a historian of ancient Judaism Lester L. Grabbe explained that earlier biblical scholars such as Julius Wellhausen (1844–1918) could be described as 'maximalist', accepting biblical text unless it has been disproven. Continuing in this tradition, both "the 'substantial historicity' of the patriarchs" and "the unified conquest of the land" were widely accepted in the United States until about the 1970s. Contrarily, Grabbe says that those in his field now "are all minimalists – at least, when it comes to the patriarchal period and the settlement. ... [V]ery few are willing to operate [as maximalists]."

In 2022, archaeologist Avraham Faust summarized recent scholarship arguing that while early histories of Israel were heavily based on biblical accounts, their reliability has been increasingly questioned over time. He continued that key debates have focused on the historicity of the Patriarchs, the Exodus, the Israelite conquest, and the United Monarchy, with archaeological evidence often challenging these narratives. He concluded that while the minimalist school of the 1990s dismissed the Bible's historical value more or less entirely, mainstream scholarship since then has taken a more balanced approach, recognizing that some biblical traditions align with archaeological findings, particularly from the 9th century BC onward.

== Composition ==
The first five books—Genesis, Exodus, Leviticus, Numbers and Deuteronomy—reached their present form in the Persian period (538–332 BC), and their authors were the elite of exilic returnees who controlled the Temple at that time. The books of Joshua, Judges, Ruth, Samuel and Kings follow, forming a history of Israel from the Conquest of Canaan to the Siege of Jerusalem c. 587 BC. There is a broad consensus among scholars that these originated as a single work (the so-called "Deuteronomistic History") during the Babylonian exile of the 6th century BC.

The two Books of Chronicles cover much the same material as the Pentateuch and Deuteronomistic history and probably date from the 4th century BC. Chronicles and Ezra–Nehemiah were probably finished during the 3rd century BC. Catholic and Orthodox Old Testaments contain two (Catholic Old Testament) to four (Orthodox) Books of the Maccabees, written in the 2nd and 1st centuries BC.

These history books make up around half the total content of the Old Testament. Of the remainder, the books of the various prophets—Isaiah, Jeremiah, Ezekiel, and the twelve "minor prophets"—were written between the 8th and 6th centuries BC, with the exceptions of Jonah and Daniel, which were written much later. The "wisdom" books—Job, Proverbs, Ecclesiastes, Psalms, Song of Songs—have various dates: Proverbs possibly was completed by the Hellenistic time (332–198 BC), though containing much older material as well; Job was completed by the 6th century BC; Ecclesiastes by the 3rd century BC.

== Themes ==
Throughout the Old Testament, God is consistently depicted as the one who created the world. Although the God of the Old Testament is not consistently presented as the only god who exists, he is always depicted as the only God whom Israel is to worship, or the one "true God", that only Yahweh (or YHWH) is Almighty.

The Old Testament stresses the special relationship between God and his chosen people, Israel, but includes instructions for proselytes as well. This relationship is expressed in the biblical covenant (contract) between the two, received by Moses. The law codes in books such as Exodus and especially Deuteronomy are the terms of the contract: Israel swears faithfulness to God, and God swears to be Israel's special protector and supporter. However, The Jewish Study Bible denies that the word covenant (brit in Hebrew) means "contract"; in the ancient Near East, a covenant would have been sworn before the gods, who would be its enforcers. As God is part of the agreement, and not merely witnessing it, The Jewish Study Bible instead interprets the term to refer to a pledge.

Further themes in the Old Testament include salvation, redemption, divine judgment, obedience and disobedience, faith and faithfulness, among others. Throughout there is a strong emphasis on ethics and ritual purity, both of which God demands, although some of the prophets and wisdom writers seem to question this, arguing that God demands social justice above purity, and perhaps does not even care about purity at all. The Old Testament's moral code enjoins fairness, intervention on behalf of the vulnerable, and the duty of those in power to administer justice righteously. It forbids murder, bribery and corruption, deceitful trading, and many sexual misdemeanours. All morality is traced back to God, who is the source of all goodness.

The problem of evil plays a large part in the Old Testament. The problem the Old Testament authors faced was that a good God must have had just reason for bringing disaster (meaning notably, but not only, the Babylonian exile) upon his people. The theme is played out, with many variations, in books as different as the histories of Kings and Chronicles, the prophets like Ezekiel and Jeremiah, and in the wisdom books like Job and Ecclesiastes.

== Formation ==
The interrelationship between various significant ancient manuscripts of the Old Testament, according to the Encyclopaedia Biblica (1903). Some manuscripts are identified by their siglum. LXX here denotes the original Septuagint.

The process by which scriptures became canons and Bibles was a long one, and its complexities account for the many different Old Testaments which exist today. Timothy H. Lim, a professor of Hebrew Bible and Second Temple Judaism at the University of Edinburgh, identifies the Old Testament as "a collection of authoritative texts of apparently divine origin that went through a human process of writing and editing." He states that it is not a magical book, nor was it literally written by God and passed to mankind. By about the 5th century BC, Jews saw the five books of the Torah (the Old Testament Pentateuch) as having authoritative status; by the 2nd century BC, the Prophets had a similar status, although without quite the same level of respect as the Torah.

=== Greek ===
Hebrew texts began to be translated into Greek in Alexandria in about 280 BC and continued until about 130 BC. These early Greek translations – supposedly commissioned by Ptolemy II Philadelphus – were called the Septuagint (Latin for 'Seventy') from the supposed number of translators involved (hence its abbreviation "LXX"). This Septuagint remains the basis of the Old Testament in the Eastern Orthodox Church.

It varies in many places from the Masoretic Text and includes numerous books no longer considered canonical in some traditions: 1 Esdras, Judith, Tobit, the books of Maccabees, the Book of Wisdom, Sirach, and Baruch. Early modern biblical criticism typically explained these variations as intentional or ignorant corruptions by the Alexandrian scholars, but most recent scholarship holds it is simply based on early source texts differing from those later used by the Masoretes in their work.

The Septuagint was originally used by Hellenized Jews whose knowledge of Greek was better than Hebrew. However, the texts came to be used predominantly by gentile converts to Christianity and by the early Church as its scripture, Greek being the lingua franca of the early Church. As a result, Greek renderings of Hebrew terms and passages influenced later Christian interpretation of the Old Testament. The three most acclaimed early interpreters were Aquila of Sinope, Symmachus the Ebionite, and Theodotion; in his Hexapla, Origen placed his edition of the Hebrew text beside its transcription in Greek letters and four parallel translations: Aquila's, Symmachus's, the Septuagint's, and Theodotion's. The so-called "fifth" and "sixth editions" were two other Greek translations supposedly miraculously discovered by students outside the towns of Jericho and Nicopolis: these were added to Origen's Octapla.

In 331, Constantine I commissioned Eusebius to deliver fifty Bibles for the Church of Constantinople. Athanasius recorded Alexandrian scribes around 340 preparing Bibles for Constans. Little else is known, though there is plenty of speculation. For example, it is speculated that this may have provided motivation for canon lists and that Codex Vaticanus and Codex Sinaiticus are examples of these Bibles. Together with the Peshitta and Codex Alexandrinus, these are the earliest extant Christian Bibles. There is no evidence among the canons of the First Council of Nicaea of any determination on the canon. However, Jerome (347–420), in his Prologue to Judith, claims that the Book of Judith was "found by the Nicene Council to have been counted among the number of the Sacred Scriptures".

=== Latin ===
In Western Christianity or Christianity in the Western half of the Roman Empire, Latin had displaced Greek as the common language of the early Christians, and in 382 AD Pope Damasus I commissioned Jerome, the leading scholar of the day, to produce an updated Latin Bible to replace the Vetus Latina, which was a Latin translation of the Septuagint. Jerome's work, called the Vulgate, was a direct translation from Hebrew, since he argued for the superiority of the Hebrew texts in correcting the Septuagint on both philological and theological grounds. His Vulgate Old Testament became the standard Bible used in the Western Church, specifically as the Sixto-Clementine Vulgate, while the Churches in the East continued, and continue, to use the Septuagint.

Jerome, however, in the Vulgate's prologues, describes some portions of books in the Septuagint not found in the Hebrew Bible as being non-canonical (he called them apocrypha); for Baruch, he mentions by name in his Prologue to Jeremiah and notes that it is neither read nor held among the Hebrews, but does not explicitly call it apocryphal or "not in the canon". The Synod of Hippo (in 393), followed by the Council of Carthage (397) and the Council of Carthage (419), may be the first council that explicitly accepted the first canon which includes the books that did not appear in the Hebrew Bible; the councils were under significant influence of Augustine of Hippo, who regarded the canon as already closed.

=== Protestant canon ===
In the 16th century, the Protestant Reformers, following Jerome's position, insisted that the Church's Old Testament should contain only the books of the Hebrew canon. However, they achieved this by simply removing the additional books which had come from of the Greek canon, so that the Protestant Old Testament does not follow the order of the Hebrew Bible, but the order of the Septuagint, only without certain books.

Rome then officially adopted a canon, the Canon of Trent, which is seen as following Augustine's Carthaginian Councils or the Council of Rome, and includes most, but not all, of the Septuagint (3 Ezra and 3 and 4 Maccabees are excluded); the Anglicans after the English Civil War adopted a compromise position, restoring the 39 Articles and keeping the extra books that were excluded by the Westminster Confession of Faith, both for private study and for reading in churches but not for establishing any doctrine, while Lutherans kept them for private study, gathered in an appendix as biblical apocrypha.

=== Other versions ===
While the Hebrew, Greek and Latin versions of the Hebrew Bible are the best known bases of the Old Testament across traditions, there were others. At much the same time as the Septuagint was being produced, translations were being made into Aramaic, the language of Jews living in Palestine and the Near East and likely the language of Jesus: these are called the Aramaic Targums, from a word meaning "translation", and were used to help Jewish congregations understand their scriptures.

For Aramaic Christians, there was a Syriac translation of the Hebrew Bible called the Peshitta, as well as versions in Coptic (the everyday language of Egypt in the first Christian centuries, descended from ancient Egyptian), Ethiopic (for use in the Ethiopian church, one of the oldest Christian churches), Armenian (Armenia was the first to adopt Christianity as its official religion), and Arabic.

== Christian theology ==
Christian interpretation refers to the "Old Testament" as such only because there is a "New Testament" to which it relates; the designation is therefore a Christian theological category rather than a Jewish one. The name "Old Testament" reflects Christianity's understanding of itself as the fulfillment of Jeremiah's prophecy of a New Covenant (which is similar to "testament" and often conflated) to replace the preceding covenant between God and Israel (Jeremiah 31:31). The emphasis, however, has shifted from Judaism's understanding of the covenant as a racially or tribally based pledge between God and the Jewish people, to one between God and any person of faith who is "in Christ".

Relating the Old and New Testaments, the Second Vatican Council outlines a Catholic theology wherein "God, the inspirer and author of both Testaments, wisely arranged that the New Testament be hidden in the Old and the Old be made manifest in the New". Dennis Hamm sees the Council's teaching as a counter to the "perennial temptation ... to dismiss the Old Testament as irrelevant for Christians".

Christianity draws from its belief that the historical Jesus is also the Christ, as in the Confession of Peter. This belief is in turn based on Jewish understandings of the meaning of the Hebrew term Messiah, which, like the Greek "Christ", means "anointed". The Hebrew Scriptures describes a king anointed with oil on his accession to the throne: he becomes "The LORD's anointed" or Yahweh's Anointed.

By the time of Jesus, some Jews expected that a flesh-and-blood descendant of David (the "Son of David") would come to establish a real Jewish kingdom in Jerusalem, instead of the Roman province of Judaea. Others stressed the Son of Man, a distinctly other-worldly figure who would appear as a judge at the end of time. Some expounded a synthesised view of both positions, where a messianic kingdom of this world would last for a set period and be followed by the other-worldly age or World to Come.

Some thought the Messiah was already present, but unrecognised due to Israel's sins; some thought that the Messiah would be announced by a forerunner, probably Elijah (as promised by the prophet Malachi, whose book now ends the Old Testament and precedes Mark's account of John the Baptist). Later parts of the Old Testament expect a descendant of David who will establish an ideal reign of peace, prosperity and righteousness. The story of Jesus' death, therefore, involved a profound shift in meaning from the Old Testament tradition.

== See also ==
- New Testament
- Biblical and Quranic narratives
- List of Hebrew Bible manuscripts
- Expounding of the Law
- Genealogies of Genesis
- Law and Gospel
- List of ancient legal codes
- Non-canonical books referenced in the Bible
- Quotations from the Hebrew Bible in the New Testament

== General and cited references ==
- Bandstra, Barry L (2004), Reading the Old Testament: an introduction to the Hebrew Bible, Wadsworth, ISBN 978-0-495-39105-0
- Barton, John (1997), How the Bible Came to Be, Westminster John Knox Press, ISBN 978-0-664-25785-9
- ——— (2001), "Introduction to the Old Testament", in Muddiman, John; Barton, John (eds.), Bible Commentary, Oxford University Press, ISBN 978-0-19-875500-5
- Berlin, Adele; Brettler, Marc Zvi, eds. (17 October 2014). The Jewish Study Bible: Second Edition. Oxford University Press. p. PT194. ISBN 978-0-19-939387-9.
- Berman, Joshua A. (Summer 2006). "God's Alliance with Man". Azure: Ideas for the Jewish Nation (25). ISSN 0793-6664.
- Blenkinsopp, Joseph (1998), "The Pentateuch", in Barton, John (ed.), The Cambridge companion to biblical interpretation, Cambridge University Press, ISBN 978-0-521-48593-7
- biblicc6. (2021, November 3). Shabbat Lectures on the Torah: SELF ESTEEM. Biblical Research Institute. https://biblicalresearchinstitute.com/shabbat-lectures-on-the-torah-self-esteem/
- Boadt, Lawrence (1984), Reading the Old Testament: an introduction, Paulist Press, ISBN 978-0-8091-2631-6
- Brettler, Marc Zvi (2005), How to read the Bible, Jewish Publication Society, ISBN 978-0-8276-1001-9
- Bultmann, Christoph (2001), "Deuteronomy", in Barton, John; Muddiman, John (eds.), Oxford Bible Commentary, Oxford University Press, ISBN 978-0-19-875500-5
- Coggins, Richard J (2003), "1 and 2 Chronicles", in Dunn, James DG; Rogerson, John William (eds.), Commentary on the Bible, Eerdmans, ISBN 978-0-8028-3711-0
- Coogan, Michael David (1 November 2008). A Brief Introduction to the Old Testament: The Hebrew Bible in Its Context. Oxford University Press. p. 106. ISBN 978-0-19-533272-8..
- Crenshaw, James L (2010), Old Testament wisdom: an introduction, Westminster John Knox Press, ISBN 978-0-664-23459-1
- Davies, GI (1998), "Introduction to the Pentateuch", in Barton, John (ed.), Oxford Bible Commentary, Oxford University Press, ISBN 978-0-19-875500-5
- Dines, Jennifer M (2004), "The Septuagint", Continuum, ISBN 978-0-567-08464-4
- Early Judaism, part 1 (video). (n.d.). Khan Academy. Retrieved November 20, 2025, from https://www.khanacademy.org/humanities/world-history/ancient-medieval/judaism/v/overview-of-early-judaism-part-1
- Emerton, J. A. (1984). [Review of Review of Reading the Old Testament: Method in Biblical Study, by J. Barton]. Vetus Testamentum, 34(3), 370–370. https://doi.org/10.2307/1518027
- Farmer, Ron (1991), "Messiah/Christ", in Mills, Watson E; Bullard, Roger Aubrey (eds.), Mercer dictionary of the Bible, Mercer University Press, ISBN 978-0-86554-373-7
- Ferguson, Everett (1996). The Church of Christ: A Biblical Ecclesiology for Today. Wm. B. Eerdmans Publishing. p. 2. ISBN 978-0-8028-4189-6.
- Gentry, Peter R (2008), "Old Greek and Later Revisors", in Sollamo, Raija; Voitila, Anssi; Jokiranta, Jutta (eds.), Scripture in transition, Brill, ISBN 978-90-04-16582-3
- Grabbe, Lester L (2003), "Ezra", in Dunn, James DG; Rogerson, John William (eds.), Commentary on the Bible, Eerdmans, ISBN 978-0-8028-3711-0
- Hasel, Gerhard F (1991), Old Testament theology: basic issues in the current debate, Eerdmans, ISBN 978-0-8028-0537-9
- Hayes, Christine (2006). "Introduction to the Old Testament (Hebrew Bible): Lecture 6 Transcript". Open Yale Courses.
- Herion, Gary A (2000), "Covenant", in Freedman, David Noel (ed.), Dictionary of the Bible, Eerdmans, ISBN 978-90-5356-503-2
- Jeon, J., & Jonker, L. C. (Eds.). (2021). Chronicles and the Priestly Literature of the Hebrew Bible. De Gruyter. https://doi.org/10.1515/9783110707014
- Jobes, Karen H.; Silva, Moisés (2005), Invitation to the Septuagint, Baker Academic
- Jones, Barry A (2000), "Canon of the Old Testament", in Freedman, David Noel (ed.), Dictionary of the Bible, William B Eerdmans, ISBN 978-90-5356-503-2
- Juel, Donald (2000), "Christ", in Freedman, David Noel (ed.), Dictionary of the Bible, William B Eerdmans, ISBN 978-90-5356-503-2
- Levine, Amy-Jill (2001). "Covenant and Law, Part I (Exodus 19–40, Leviticus, Deuteronomy). Lecture 10" (PDF). The Old Testament. Course Guidebook. The Great Courses. p. 46. Archived from the original (PDF) on 2 March 2021.
- Lim, Timothy H. (2005). The Dead Sea Scrolls: A Very Short Introduction. Oxford: Oxford University Press.
- McLay, Tim (2003), The use of the Septuagint in New Testament research, Eerdmans, ISBN 978-0-8028-6091-0
- Miller, John W (2004), How the Bible came to be, Paulist Press, ISBN 978-0-8091-4183-8
- Miller, John W (1987), Meet the prophets: a beginner's guide to the books of the biblical prophets, Paulist Press, ISBN 978-0-8091-2899-0
- Miller, Stephen R. (1994), Daniel, B&H Publishing Group, ISBN 978-0-8054-0118-9
- Rogerson, John W. (2003), "Deuteronomy", in Dunn, James DG; Rogerson, John William (eds.), Commentary on the Bible, Eerdmans, ISBN 978-0-8028-3711-0
- Sailhamer, John H. (1992), The Pentateuch As Narrative, Zondervan, ISBN 978-0-310-57421-7
- Schniedewind, William M (2004), How the Bible Became a Book, Cambridge, ISBN 978-0-521-53622-6
- Ska, Jean Louis (2009). The Exegesis of the Pentateuch: Exegetical Studies and Basic Questions. Mohr Siebeck. p. 213. ISBN 978-3-16-149905-0.
- Soggin, J. Alberto (1987), Introduction to the Old Testament, Westminster John Knox Press, ISBN 978-0-664-22156-0
- Stuart, Douglas (1987), Hosea-Jonah, Thomas Nelson, ISBN 978-0-8499-0230-7
- Würthwein, Ernst (1995), The text of the Old Testament: an introduction to the Biblia Hebraica, William B Eerdmans, ISBN 978-0-8028-0788-5
