= Historical books =

Division of the Christian Old Testament

The historical books are a division of Christian Bibles, grouping 12 books of the Old Testament that follow the Pentateuch, beginning with the Book of Joshua. It includes the Former Prophets from the Nevi'im and two of the ungrouped books of Ketuvim of the Hebrew Bible together with the Book of Ruth and the Book of Esther which in the Hebrew are both found in the Five Megillot. These books describe Israel’s history as a people in the land of Canaan. These books make up the historical books in the Old Testament, with several differences between Protestant, Catholic and Orthodox Biblical canons.

== Contents ==
The sequence of books that have been categorised by Christians as "the historical books" is based on the Septuagint (LXX, also known as "Greek Old Testament") rather than on the Hebrew Bible, which has a different order. Branick (2011) stated: 'The grouping seems to be based on the narrative character of all the books, some describing the major events in the history of Israel, others describing characters set in that history. This is the sequence more or less found in Protestant, Catholic, and Orthodox Bibles.'

The 4th-century Christian bishop Athanasius of Alexandria was the first to label this collection of biblical books as "histories". This term is misleading for three reasons:

1. The books are not 'historical' in the modern sense of the word, namely attempting to describe events "as they really were". In pre-modern times, 'histories' were generally written for didactic purposes (teaching readers how to live good lives), to justify a king's actions or to prove he fulfilled his royal duties (official histories/biographies), or written with various religious or ideological goals in mind.
2. The books cover a wide range of genres beyond just 'history' (in its pre-modern sense).
3. There are several books (such as parts of Genesis, Exodus, Numbers, the opening of Deuteronomy, and some Psalms including 78, 105, 106, 107) similar to some in this grouping of "Historical Books" in the sense that they contain narratives about the past, but they are found in different sections of the Bible.

The books provide a collection of stories about the Israelites spanning nearly a millennium, from their conquest of Canaan until the return to Zion in 539 BCE. The historical books tell of the entry of the Israelites into the Promised Land after The Exodus, the leadership of the biblical judges, the establishment of the United Monarchy and its subsequent division into the northern Kingdom of Israel and southern Kingdom of Judah, and the Babylonian captivity. Modern scholars think that what reliable material can be found in these books of the Bible describes a period from the late second millennium to the 4th century BCE, often written down long after the alleged events, and edited several times. In addition, they warn that it is important to try to distinguish fact from fiction and that the term "historical books" should be taken with a grain of salt.

== List ==
The historical books of the main Christian canons are as follows:

- Joshua
- Judges
- Ruth
- Samuel, split in two in Christian Bibles:
  - I Samuel
  - II Samuel
- Kings, split in two in Christian Bibles:
  - I Kings
  - II Kings
- Chronicles, split in two in Christian Bibles:
  - I Chronicles
  - II Chronicles
- Ezra (1 Esdras)
- Nehemiah (2 Esdras)
- Tobit (not included in Protestant canons)
- Judith (not included in Protestant canons)
- Esther
- Some of the Books of the Maccabees:
  - 1 Maccabees (not included in Protestant canons)
  - 2 Maccabees (not included in Protestant canons)
  - 3 Maccabees (only included in the Orthodox canons)
  - 4 Maccabees (Protestant, Catholic, and Eastern Orthodox Churches consider it noncanonical. The Catholic Trent Council and the Eastern Orthodox Quintsext Council exclude it, but Greek Orthodox and Georgian Orthodox Bibles have included it in their pages without officially considering it canonical.)
- 3 Esdras ("3 Esdras" in Russian Bibles correspond to "4 Esdras" in Vulgate Bibles. Russian and Georgian Bibles often include it, but their Churches consider it noncanonical based on the Eastern Orthodox Quintsext Council. The Protestant and Catholic Churches also consider it noncanonical.)

== See also ==
- Biblical canon
- Divisions of the Hebrew Bible
  - Torah
  - Nevi'im
  - Ketuvim
- Historicity of the Bible
- History of ancient Israel and Judah
- Other major divisions of the Old Testament:
  - Pentateuch
  - Poetic Books
  - Prophetic books
