= National Library of Luxembourg =

- Bibliotheque Nationale du Luxembourg
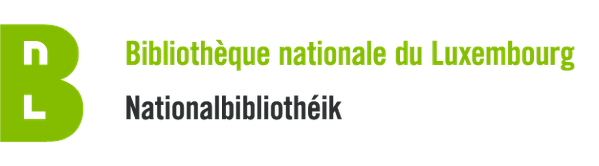

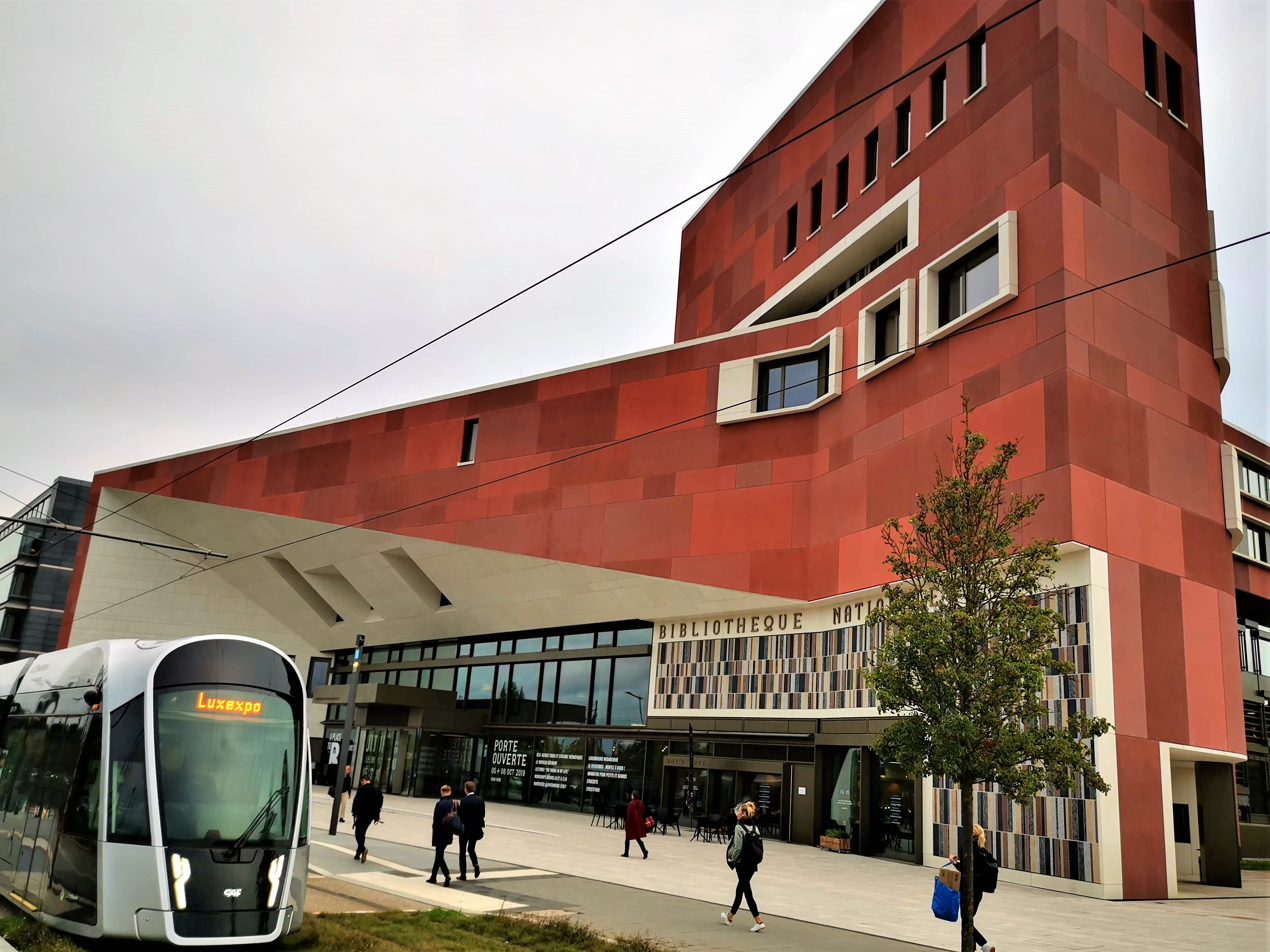
- 49.629978°N 6.164910°E
- Location: 37D, Avenue John F. Kennedy; Kirchberg, Luxembourg City, Luxembourg
- Established: 1899
- Architect: Bolles+Wilson
- Reference to legal mandate: Law of 25 June 2004 on the reorganization of State cultural institutes Law of 24 June 2010 on public libraries
- Branches: 90 members of the bibnet.lu network

Collection
- Size: 1.8 million printed documents 77,800 titles of electronic periodicals 661,000 ebooks 390 databases
- Legal deposit: Yes

Access and use
- Access requirements: Anyone can register for free. Home loans are only available to residents of Luxembourg or neighbouring regions over the age of 14, as well as to students registered with a higher education organization approved by the Luxembourg State.
- Members: 34,651 registered users

Other information
- Budget: €15,259,788 (2019)
- Parent organization: Ministry of Culture
- Website: bnl.public.lu

The National Library of Luxembourg (French: Bibliothèque nationale du Luxembourg [biblijɔtɛk nɑsjɔnal dy lyksɑ̃buʁ]; Luxembourgish: Nationalbibliothéik Lëtzebuerg; German: Nationalbibliothek Luxemburg [natsi̯oˈnaːlbiblioˌteːk ˈlʊksm̩bʊʁk]), abbreviated as BnL, is Luxembourg's national library. It was founded in its current form in 1899, as a result of a series of different institutions originating in the 18th century. It is located in the Kirchberg district of Luxembourg City. The BnL is a public establishment under the supervision of the Ministry of Culture.

The BnL holds 1.8 million printed items, making it the largest library in Luxembourg. The library's collections include both print and digital documents, such as books, manuscripts, journals, newspapers, magazines, databases, maps, stamps, prints, drawings and scores by Luxembourgish composers. Roughly three quarters of its contents, particularly scientific resources, come from abroad.

As a legal deposit library, the BnL receives copies of books and other printed and digital documents published in Luxembourg. It is also the country's national ISBN, ISSN, ISMN and ISNI agency.

== History ==
On 1 April 1798, the school library 'Bibliothèque de l’École centrale' was founded based on a law from 25 October 1795. Five years later, on 28 January 1803, it became a municipal library in Luxembourg City and changed its name to 'Bibliothèque de Luxembourg'. The budget law of 28 March 1899 finally renamed it 'Bibliothèque nationale de Luxembourg'. This name was kept until October 2019.

Between 1973 and 2019 the library was located in the renovated building of the prior 'collège jésuite' next to the Luxembourg Notre-Dame cathedral on Boulevard Roosevelt. The law of 18 April 2013 defines the construction of a building in accordance with the functional needs of a national library of the 21st century, responding not only to the needs of conservation and valorisation of Luxembourg's intellectual heritage, but also to the renewed needs of the public and of future generations. Upon moving into its new Kirchberg building on 1 October 2019, it adopted its current name, Bibliothèque nationale du Luxembourg. The transition from "de" to "du" in its French-language name, signifies that the library serves the country of Luxembourg, rather than simply the capital, Luxembourg City.

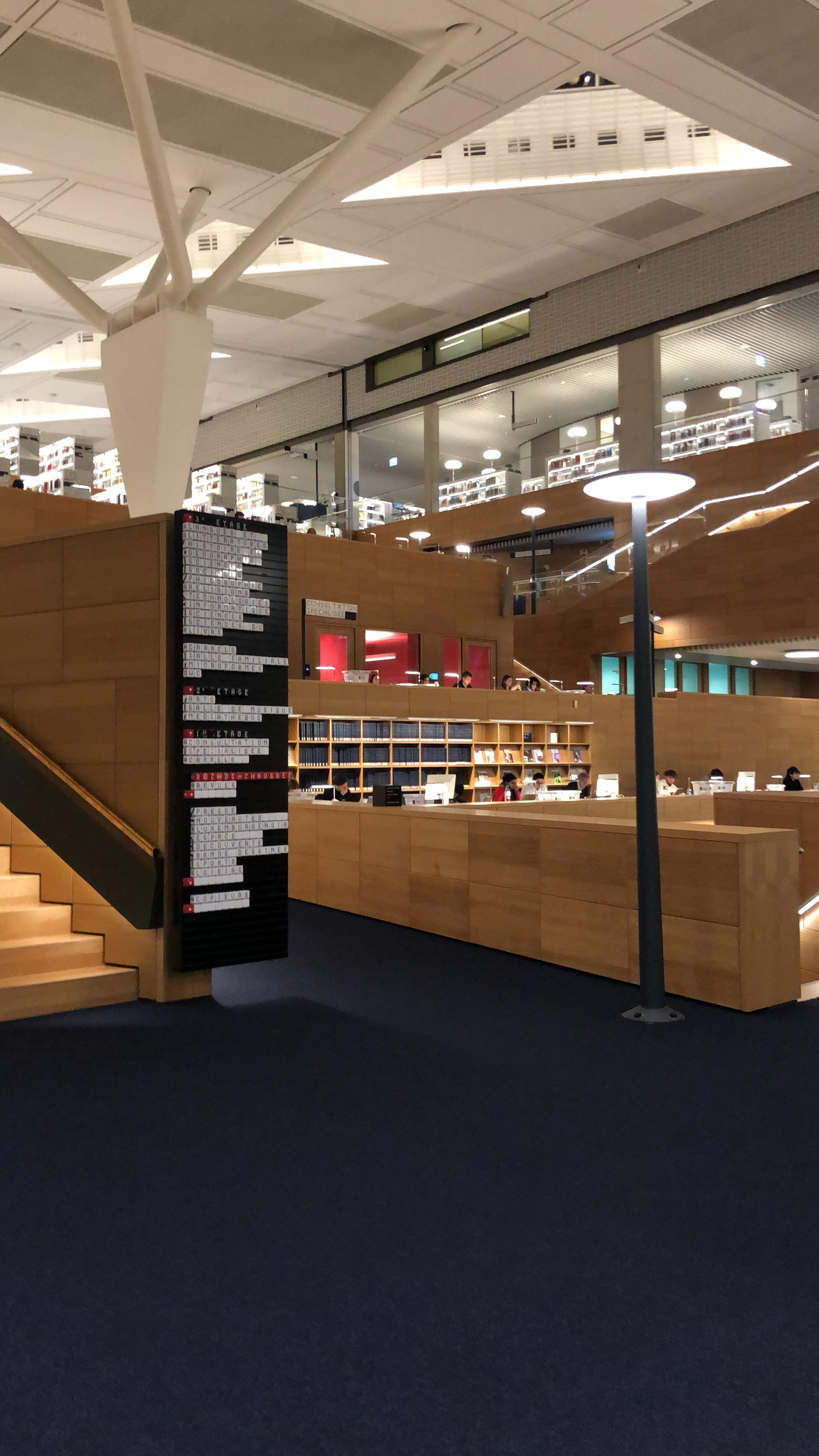
The interior of the National Library of Luxembourg

In November 2024, the library announced the acquisition by purchase of the Giant Bible of Saint Maximin.

== Tasks ==
=== Heritage library ===
As the country's main heritage library, the BnL is tasked with collecting, cataloging, preserving and valorising Luxembourgish heritage in all fields of knowledge. It does so through legal deposit, as well as by completing its collections through acquisitions of documents that are published abroad by Luxembourgish citizens, authors or habitants, or which are otherwise linked to the country. Moreover, it creates and publishes an annual national bibliography of publications that have entered the collection through legal deposit. The library also manages special collections containing i.e. manuscripts, rare and valuable documents, prints, maps, photos, musical texts and artist's books.

The BnL not only preserves but also studies these collections and regularly publishes its work, such as the 'De Litty' series, which aims to make Luxembourg's musical heritage more accessible to teachers and the younger generation. Moreover, the library curates and hosts exhibitions of patrimonial value as well as events and conferences either by itself or in collaboration with other establishments.

=== Research and scientific library ===
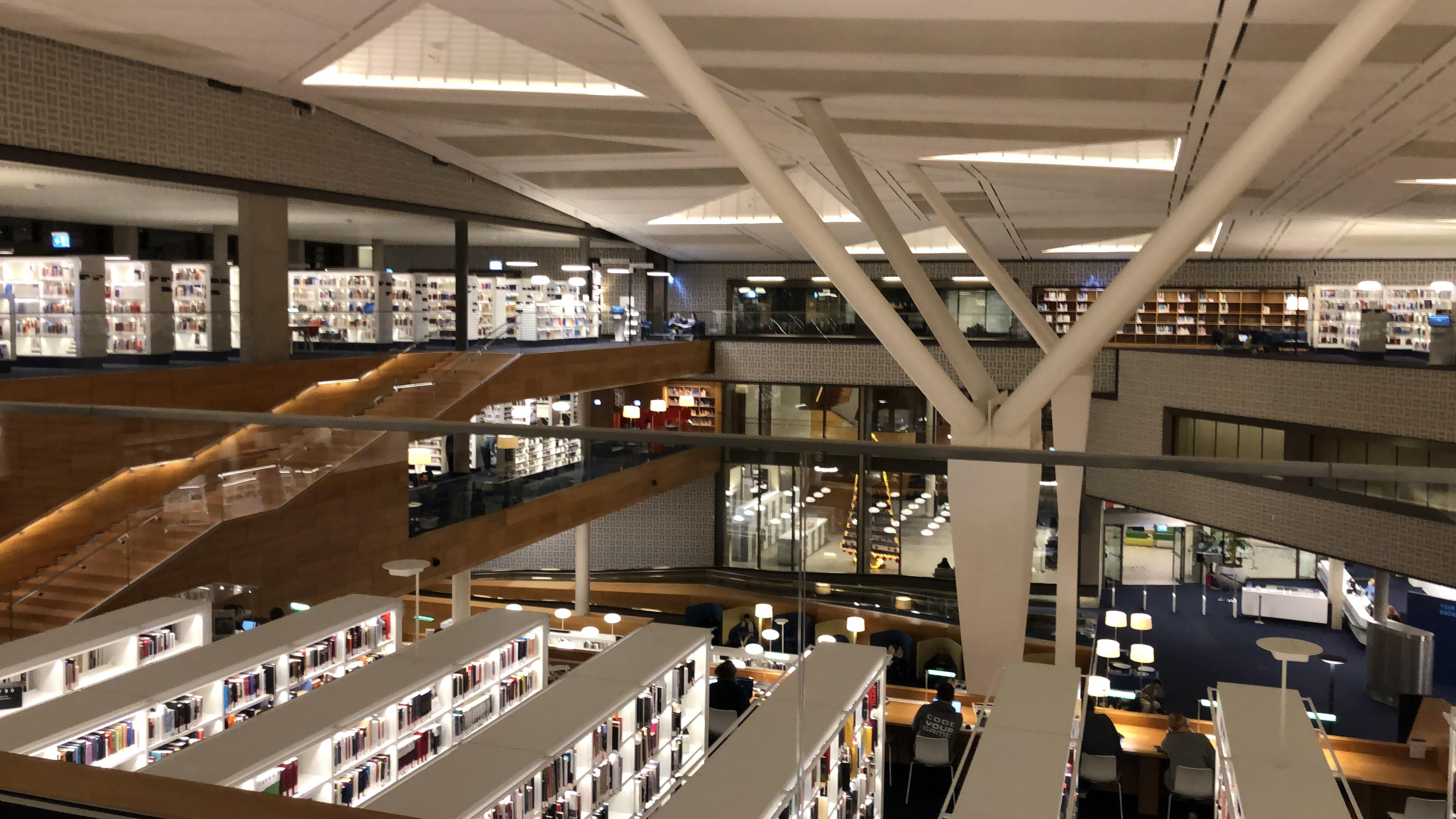
View of the library from the top floor

The BnL is a major research and scientific library and along with its Luxemburgensia collection, it also catalogues, preserves and valorises non-Luxembourgish publications of scientific and cultural value. It does so in order to meet the demands of its users. Similarly to course of action as a heritage library, the BnL also produces publications and hosts exhibitions, conferences and events in order to valorise its non-Luxembourgish collections.

=== Accessibility ===
The BnL must make as much of its collections as possible accessible to a maximum number of people, either through loans, on-site consultations or through the use of modern data transmission technologies. While anyone can register for free with the library, home loans and access to digital resources are reserved for people aged 14 and above living in Luxembourg or in neighbouring regions as well as for students registered with a higher education institution approved by the Luxembourg State.

=== Consortium coordination ===
The Luxembourg Consortium serves the acquisition and management of electronic publications. Its offer enables a wide range of publications to be made available to academia, research, government officials and the general public. The BnL coordinates the Luxembourg Consortium and takes care of administration, software management, access and the negotiation of licenses and subscriptions.

In addition to the BnL, the consortium members are the University of Luxembourg, the Luxembourg Institute of Science and Technology (LIST), the Luxembourg Institute of Health (LIH), the Max Planck Institute Luxembourg, IFEN and SCRIPT.

In 2017, the government library bibgov.lu was born out of a cooperation between the BnL, the Ministry of the Civil Service and Administrative Reform and the Centre for State Information Technologies (CTIE). It provides specialised digital resources to ministries and state administrations.

The Luxembourg Consortium also coordinates and manages the ebooks.lu project, a free digital book lending service for e-books and digital audiobooks in French, German and English, accessible to readers of the National Library, the Bicherbus and several Luxembourg public libraries.

=== Network coordination ===
Since 1985, the BnL coordinates a network of 90 libraries in Luxembourg called 'bibnet.lu'. It manages the software systems and tools used by the member libraries, coordinates the cataloging and indexing works and manages the national catalogue. The national library also provides ongoing training for member libraries and their staff.

=== Bicherbus ===
The Bicherbus is a mobile library scheme serving 81 Luxembourgish villages on a weekly basis. Refurbished buses, in which the passenger seats have been replaced with bookshelves, circulate on multiple routes across the country. Since 24 June 2010, the BnL manages the Bicherbus scheme.

== See also ==
- List of Jesuit sites
