= Poetic Books =

Wisdom literature found in the Bible

The Poetic Books, also called the Sapiential Books, are a division of the Christian Bible grouping five or seven books (depending on the canon) in the Old Testament. The term "Sapiential Books" refers to the same set, although not all the Psalms are usually regarded as belonging to the Wisdom tradition.

In terms of the Tanakh, it includes the three poetic books of Ketuvim, as well as Ecclesiastes and the Song of Songs from the Five Megillot. Wisdom and Sirach are also part of the Poetic Books, and are found in the Greek Septuagint version of the Hebrew Bible but are not part of the Hebrew Masoretic Text, and are seen by Protestant Christians as apocryphal, for which reason they are placed between the Old Testament and New Testament in the King James Bible or are excluded from other Protestant Bibles.

== List ==
The Poetic Books are:

- Job
- Psalms
- Proverbs
- Ecclesiastes
- Song of Songs
- Wisdom (not included in Protestant canons)
- Sirach (not included in Protestant canons)

== See also ==
- Biblical canon
- Other major divisions of the Old Testament:
  - Pentateuch
  - Historical books
  - Prophetic books
