= Books of the Kingdoms =

Four books of the Septuagint

The Books of the Kingdoms, Books of Kingdoms, or Books of Reigns (Koine Greek: Βíβλοι Βασιλειῶν) are the names that four books of the Hebrew Bible are given in the Septuagint. 1 and 2 Kingdoms are equivalent to 1 and 2 Samuel, and 3 and 4 Kingdoms are equivalent to 1 and 2 Kings in most modern English versions.

These books are known in the Vulgate version as the four Books of the Kingdoms (Libri Regnum or Regnorum), or the Book of Kings (Liber Regum) as Jerome disagreed with the expression Books of the Kingdoms (Libri Regnorum) of the LXX. Jerome says:

Third comes Samuel, which we call the first and second Kings. Fourth Malachim, that is contained in the third and fourth books of Kings. It is much better to say Malachim, of kings, than Malachoth, of kingdoms. For it does not describe the kingdoms of many peoples but of one Israelite people which included twelve tribes.

Those books are known as the Books of Reigns in the New English Translation of the Septuagint.

== Names and numbering ==
Names of the four Books of the Kingdoms across textual traditions
Septuagint book	Greek	Hebrew Bible	Latin Vulgate	Douay–Rheims Bible (1610)	Modern English Bibles (Protestant and Catholic)
1 Kingdoms (1 Reigns)	Βασιλειῶν Αʹ	1 Samuel (שְׁמוּאֵל א)	1 Regum (Clementine); 1 Samuelis (Nova Vulgata)	1 Kings	1 Samuel
2 Kingdoms (2 Reigns)	Βασιλειῶν Βʹ	2 Samuel (שְׁמוּאֵל ב)	2 Regum (Clementine); 2 Samuelis (Nova Vulgata)	2 Kings	2 Samuel
3 Kingdoms (3 Reigns)	Βασιλειῶν Γʹ	1 Kings (מְלָכִים א)	3 Regum (Clementine); 1 Regum (Nova Vulgata)	3 Kings	1 Kings
4 Kingdoms (4 Reigns)	Βασιλειῶν Δʹ	2 Kings (מְלָכִים ב)	4 Regum (Clementine); 2 Regum (Nova Vulgata)	4 Kings	2 Kings
