= Prophetic books =

Parts of the Bible

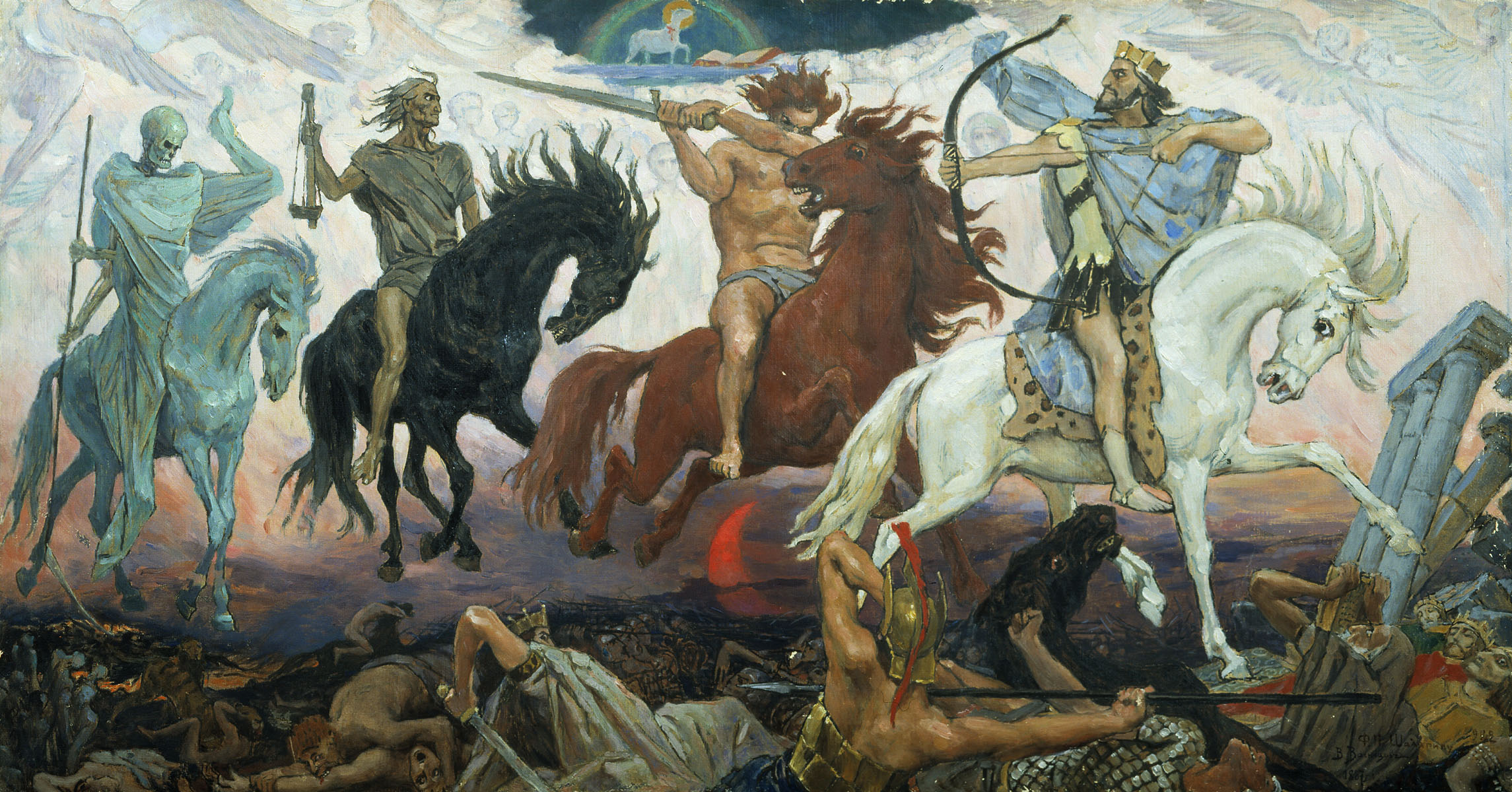
Four Horsemen of Apocalypse, by Viktor Vasnetsov, 1887

The prophetic books are a division of the Christian Bible, grouping 18 books (Catholic and Orthodox canon) or 17 books (Protestant canon, excluding Baruch) in the Old Testament. In terms of the Tanakh, it includes the Latter Prophets from the Nevi'im, with the addition of Lamentations (which in the Tanakh is one of the Five Megillot) and Daniel, both of which are included among the books of the Hebrew Ketuvim.

The prophetic books are named as such because prophets are traditionally attributed as authors. However, modern scholars think that the books as they have been handed down to the present time are the work of successive generations of writers who took their inspiration from the messages of these prophets. These authors were active between 750 BC and 450 BC. The first six of the books are known as the major prophets, while the last 12 are known as the minor prophets. These names do not imply that the major prophets are more important than the minor prophets, but refer to the major prophetic books being much longer than the minor ones. The books of Isaiah, Jeremiah and Ezekiel have 66, 52 and 48 chapters, respectively, while the minor prophets merely have 1 to 14 chapters per book.

Incidentally, outside of the prophetic books, prophets also feature as characters in other books of the Hebrew Bible.

== List ==
The major prophets in Christianity are:

- Isaiah
- Jeremiah
- Lamentations
- Baruch (not included in Protestant canons)
- Ezekiel
- Daniel

In Judaism, only Isaiah, Jeremiah and Ezekiel are counted amongst the 'major prophets'. Baruch, a Septuagintal book, is considered canonical in Catholicism, Eastern Orthodoxy, and Oriental Orthodox churches and apocryphal in Protestant Christianity and in Judaism.

The minor prophets are the same in Christianity as in Judaism (however, in Jewish Bibles they are grouped as one single book, titled "The Twelve"):

- Hosea
- Joel
- Amos
- Obadiah
- Jonah
- Micah
- Nahum
- Habakkuk
- Zephaniah
- Haggai
- Zechariah
- Malachi

== See also ==
- Other major divisions of the Old Testament:
  - Torah or Pentateuch
  - Historical books
  - Poetic Books
