= Saint Maximin's Abbey, Trier =

Coordinates: 49°45′35″N 6°39′06″E

- German: Reichsabtei St. Maximin
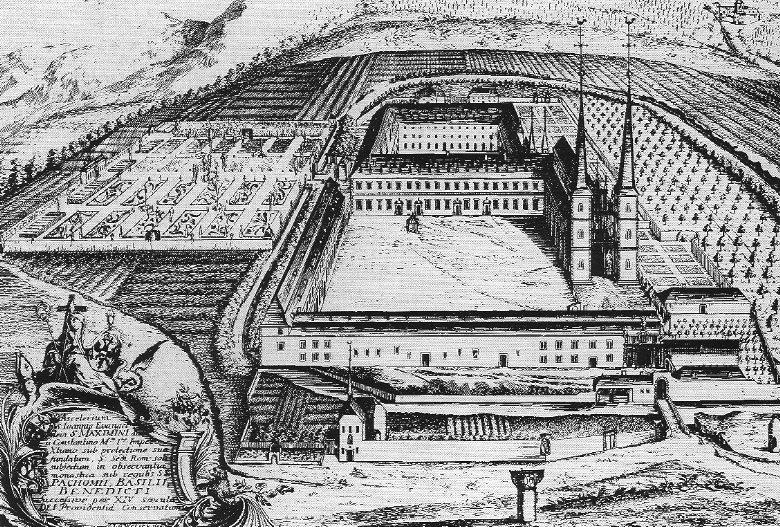
- Interactive map of Saint Maximin's Abbey, Trier

Monastery information
- Order: Benedictine
- Established: 4th century

People
- Founder: Saint Maximin of Trier

Site
- Location: Trier, Germany

Saint Maximin's Abbey (German: Reichsabtei St. Maximin) was a Benedictine monastery in Trier, Germany.

== History ==
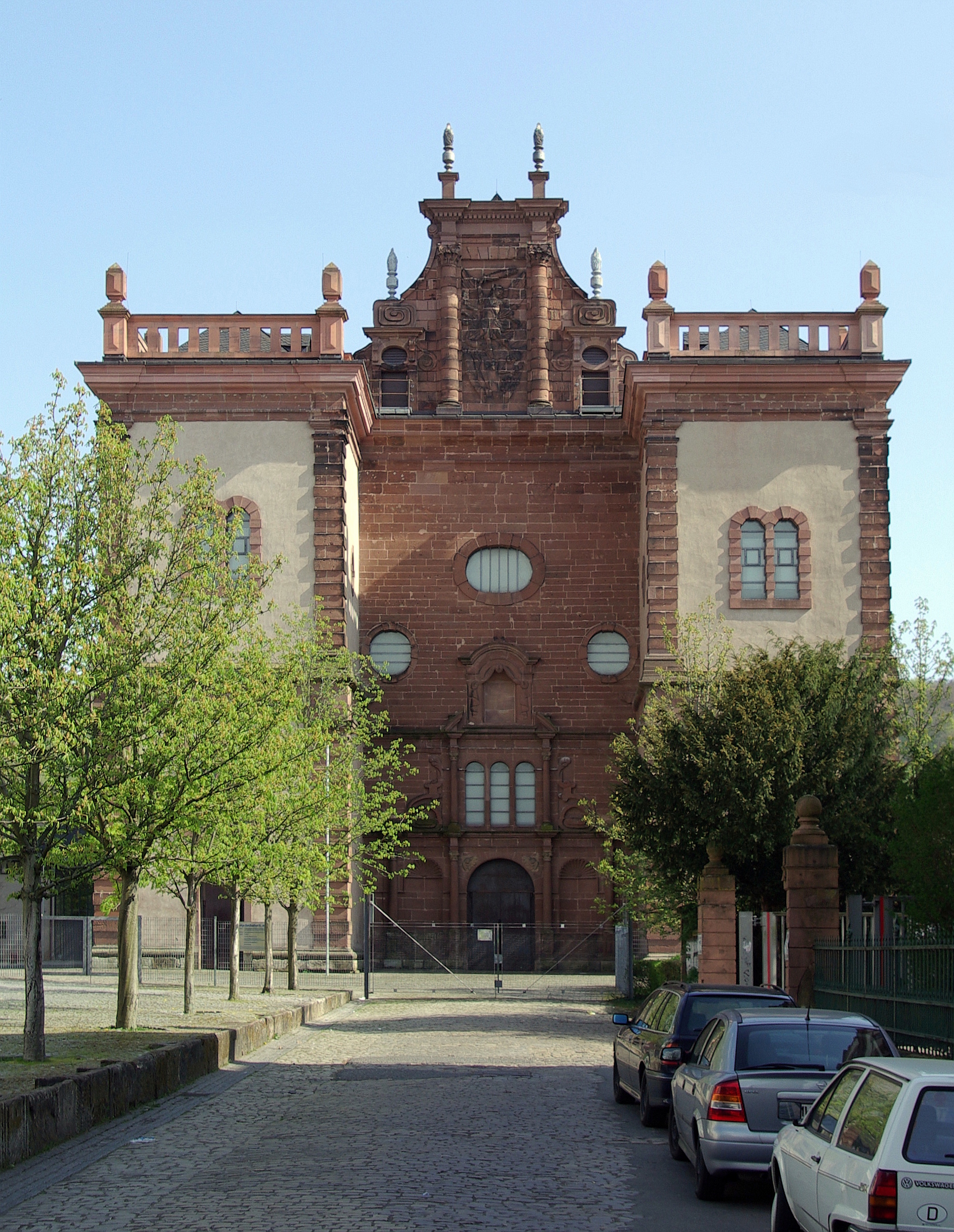
Church of Saint Maximin, west front

The abbey, traditionally considered one of the oldest monasteries in western Europe, was held to have been founded by Saint Maximin of Trier in the 4th century. Maximin (died 346) and other early bishops of Trier were buried in the crypt of the church on the site, an early Christian cemetery, and the church, at first dedicated to Saint John the Evangelist, was later renamed after Maximin. A Benedictine monastery was established here in the 6th century, possibly replacing an earlier community. It was destroyed by the Normans in 882 and re-built from 942 to 952. In the 13th century it was destroyed by a fire and re-built again on the plan of the previous buildings.

Albero de Montreuil failed to subject the abbey to Trier's jurisdiction in the early 12th century, but the question of the abbey's Imperial immediacy (German: Reichsunmittelbarkeit) was for centuries a matter of conflict, contested by Trier, to whom in 1669 the abbot formally renounced all claim to the status, making submission to the archbishop in his capacity as Prince-elector.

In 1674 the abbey was completely destroyed by French troops. It was rebuilt between 1680 and 1684 but, unusually for the period, still in a Gothic form.

The abbey was secularised in 1802. The monastic buildings were put to various secular uses — barracks, prison, school — and were totally destroyed in World War II except for the freestanding gateway. A school stands on the site.

The church of Saint Maximin survived the war, but was de-consecrated, and between 1979 and 1995 converted to secular uses. In 1995 it opened as a concert hall, now well known for its exceptional acoustics.

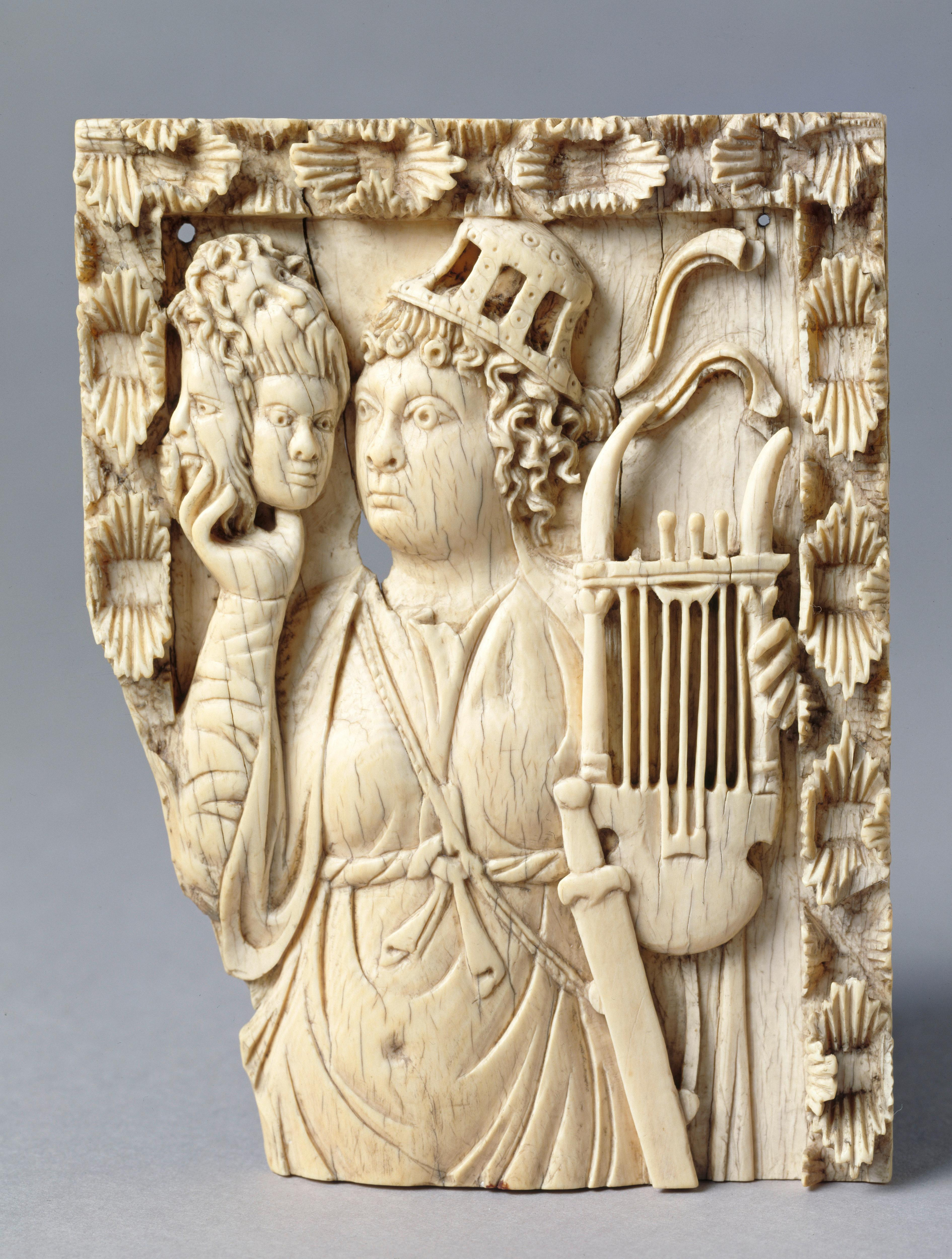
Early 6th century A.D., Trier. Artwork found at Trier, a "Muse of Comedy" holding a lyre, masks and sword. The artwork was the lid to a box.

== Burials ==
- Regino of Prüm
- Maximin of Trier

== See also ==
- Giant Bible of Saint Maximin
