= Development of the Old Testament canon =

The Old Testament is the first section of the two-part Christian biblical canon; the second section is the New Testament. The Old Testament includes the books of the Hebrew Bible (Tanakh) or protocanon, and in various Christian denominations also includes deuterocanonical books. Orthodox Christians, Catholics and Protestants use different canons, which differ with respect to the texts that are included in the Old Testament.

Following Jerome's Veritas Hebraica (truth of the Hebrew) principle, the Protestant Old Testament consists of the same books as the Hebrew Bible, but the order and division of the books are different. Protestants number the Old Testament books at 39, while the Hebrew Bible numbers the same books as 24. The Hebrew Bible counts Samuel, Kings, and Chronicles as one book each, the 12 minor prophets are one book, and also Ezra and Nehemiah form a single book.

In the Catholic Church, the books of the Old Testament, including the deuterocanonical books, were previously held to be canonical by the Council of Rome (382 AD), the Synod of Hippo (in 393), followed by the Council of Carthage (397), the Council of Carthage (419), the Council of Florence (1442) and finally the Council of Trent (1546).

The New Testament quotations are taken from the Septuagint used by the authors of the 27 books of the New Testament.

The differences between the modern Hebrew Bible and other versions of the Old Testament such as the Samaritan Pentateuch, the Syriac Peshitta, the Latin Vulgate, the Greek Septuagint, the Ethiopian Bible and other canons, are more substantial. Many of these canons include books and sections of books that the others do not. For a more comprehensive discussion of these differences, see Books of the Bible.

== Table of books ==
Books of the Christian Old Testament
See also Torah, Samaritan Torah
- Genesis
- Exodus
- Leviticus
- Numbers
- Deuteronomy
See also Hebrew Bible#Books of the Tanakh
- Joshua
- Judges
- Ruth
- 1–2 Samuel
- 1–2 Kings
- 1–2 Chronicles
- Ezra
- Nehemiah
- Esther
- Job
- Psalms
- Proverbs
- Ecclesiastes
- Song of Solomon
- Isaiah
- Jeremiah
- Lamentations
- Ezekiel
- Daniel
- Hosea
- Joel
- Amos
- Obadiah
- Jonah
- Micah
- Nahum
- Habakkuk
- Zephaniah
- Haggai
- Zechariah
- Malachi
Included by Catholics, Orthodox, but excluded by most Protestants
- Tobit
- Judith
- 1 Maccabees
- 2 Maccabees
- Wisdom (of Solomon)
- Sirach
- Baruch
- Letter of Jeremiah (included as the sixth chapter of Baruch by Catholics)
- Additions to Daniel (the Story of Susanna, the Prayer of Azariah and the Song of the Three Young Men, and the Story of Bel and the Dragon)
- Additions to Esther
Included by Eastern Orthodox (Synod of Jerusalem):
- 1 Esdras (see Esdras for other names)
- 3 Maccabees
- Prayer of Manasseh
- Psalm 151
- Odes
Included by Armenian Apostolic and Ethiopian Orthodox:
- 2 Esdras
Included by Ethiopian Orthodox and Beta Israel:
- Jubilees
- Enoch
- 1–3 Meqabyan
- Paralipomena of Jeremiah
Included in Greek Septuagint, Syriac Peshitta and other early Christian manuscripts:
- Psalms of Solomon
Included by Syriac Peshitta Bible:
- Psalms 152–155
- 2 Baruch
Included by Beta Israel:
- Testament of Abraham
- Testament of Isaac
- Testament of Jacob

== Hebrew Bible canon ==
The Hebrew Bible (or Tanakh) consists of 24 books of the Masoretic Text recognized by Rabbinic Judaism. There is no scholarly consensus as to when the Hebrew Bible canon was fixed, with some scholars arguing that it was fixed by the Hasmonean dynasty (140-40 BCE), while others arguing that it was not fixed until the 2nd century CE or even later. According to Marc Zvi Brettler, the Jewish scriptures outside the Torah and the Prophets were fluid, with different groups seeing authority in different books.

Michael Barber says that the earliest and most explicit evidence of a Hebrew canonical list comes from Jewish historian Josephus (37CE – c. 100CE) who wrote about a canon used by Jews in the first century AD. In Against Apion (Book 1, Paragraph 8), Josephus in 95 CE divided sacred scriptures into three parts: 5 books of the Torah, 13 books of the prophets, and 4 books of hymns:

For we have not an innumerable multitude of books among us, disagreeing from and contradicting one another, [as the Greeks have,] but only twenty-two books, which contain the records of all the past times; which are justly believed to be divine; and of them five belong to Moses, which contain his laws and the traditions of the origin of mankind till his death. This interval of time was little short of three thousand years; but as to the time from the death of Moses till the reign of Artaxerxes king of Persia, who reigned after Xerxes, the prophets, who were after Moses, wrote down what was done in their times in thirteen books. The remaining four books contain hymns to God, and precepts for the conduct of human life. It is true, our history hath been written since Artaxerxes very particularly, but hath not been esteemed of the like authority with the former by our forefathers, because there hath not been an exact succession of prophets since that time; and how firmly we have given credit to these books of our own nation is evident by what we do; for during so many ages as have already passed, no one has been so bold as either to add any thing to them, to take any thing from them, or to make any change in them; but it is become natural to all Jews immediately, and from their very birth, to esteem these books to contain Divine doctrines, and to persist in them, and, if occasion be willingly to die for them.

Josephus mentions Ezra and Nehemiah in Antiquities of the Jews (Book XI, Chapter 5) and Esther (during the rule of Artaxerxes) in Chapter 6. The canon is until the reign of Artaxerxes as mentioned by Josephus in Against Apion (Book 1, Paragraph 8). For a long time, following this date, the divine inspiration of Esther, the Song of Songs, and Ecclesiastes was often under scrutiny. According to Gerald A. Larue, Josephus' listing represents what came to be the Jewish canon, although scholars were still wrestling with problems of the authority of certain writings at the time that he was writing. Barber says that Josephus' 22 books were not universally accepted, since other Jewish communities used more than 22 books.

In 1871, Heinrich Graetz concluded that there had been a Council of Jamnia (or Yavne in Hebrew) which had decided Jewish canon sometime in the late 1st century (c. 70–90). This became the prevailing scholarly consensus for much of the 20th century. However, the theory of the Council of Jamnia is largely discredited today.

2 Esdras refers to the canon of 24 books which likely refers to the same canon as the Talmud has.

Not much is known about the canon of the Essenes, and what their attitude was towards the apocryphal writings, however the Essenes perhaps did not esteem the book of Esther highly as manuscripts of Esther are completely absent in Qumran, likely because of their opposition to mixed marriages and the use of different calendars.

Philo referred to a threefold canon of the Old Testament, but never made a clear list of all the books of the canon, he cites the books of Moses as inspired, but never quotes Daniel, the Song of Songs, the Deuterocanonicals, Ezekiel, Ruth, Lamentations and Ecclesiastes.

== Septuagint ==
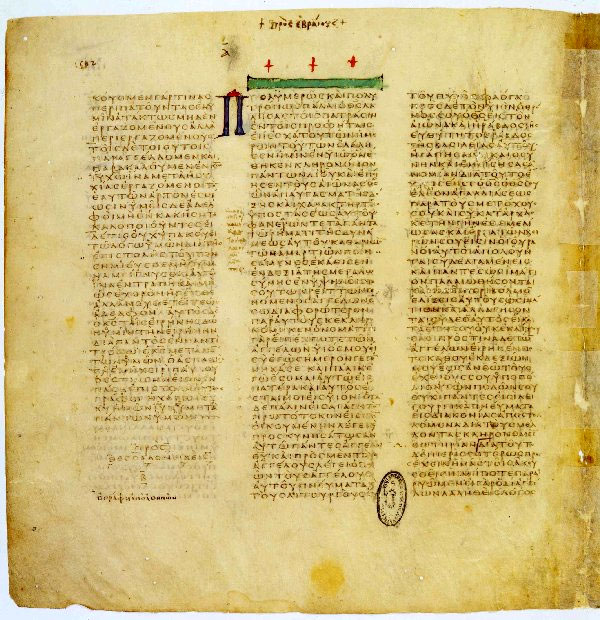
The Septuagint (LXX): A page from the Codex Vaticanus Graecus 1209, the basis of Sir Lancelot Brenton's English translation.

The Early Christian Church used the Greek texts since Greek was a lingua franca of the Roman Empire at the time, and the language of the Greco-Roman Church (Aramaic was the language of Syriac Christianity).

The Septuagint seems to have been a major source for the Apostles, but it is not the only one. St. Jerome offered, for example, Matt 2:15 and 2:23, John 19:37, John 7:38, 1 Cor. 2:9. as examples not found in the Septuagint, but in Hebrew texts. (Matt 2:23 is not present in current Masoretic tradition either, though according to St. Jerome it was in Isaiah 11:1.) The New Testament writers, when citing the Jewish scriptures, or when quoting Jesus doing so, freely used the Greek translation, implying that Jesus, his Apostles, and their followers considered it reliable.

In the Early Christian Church, the presumption that the Septuagint (LXX) was translated by Jews before the era of Christ, and that the Septuagint at certain places gives itself more to a christological interpretation than 2nd-century Hebrew texts was taken as evidence that "Jews" had changed the Hebrew text in a way that made them less Christological. For example, Irenaeus concerning Isaiah 7:14: The Septuagint clearly writes of a virgin (Greek παρθένος) that shall conceive. While the Hebrew text was, according to Irenaeus, at that time interpreted by Theodotion and Aquila (both proselytes of the Jewish faith) as a young woman that shall conceive. According to Irenaeus, the Ebionites used this to claim that Joseph was the (biological) father of Jesus. From Irenaeus' point of view that was pure heresy, facilitated by (late) anti-Christian alterations of the scripture in Hebrew, as evident by the older, pre-Christian, Septuagint.

When Jerome undertook the revision of the Old Latin translations of the Septuagint, he checked the Septuagint against the Hebrew texts that were then available. He broke with the majority of Latin translations of his time and translated most of the Old Testament of his Vulgate from Hebrew rather than Greek. His denigration of the Septuagint text was severely criticized by Augustine, his contemporary; a flood of still less moderate criticism came from those who regarded Jerome as a forger. While on the one hand he argued for the superiority of the Hebrew texts in correcting the Septuagint on both philological and theological grounds, on the other, in the context of accusations of heresy against him, Jerome would acknowledge the Septuagint texts as well.

The Eastern Orthodox Church still prefers to use the LXX as the basis for translating the Old Testament into other languages. The Eastern Orthodox also use LXX (Septuagint) untranslated where Greek is the liturgical language, e.g. in the Orthodox Church of Constantinople, the Church of Greece and the Cypriot Orthodox Church. Critical translations of the Old Testament, while using the Masoretic Text as their basis, consult the Septuagint as well as other versions in an attempt to reconstruct the meaning of the Hebrew text whenever the latter is unclear, undeniably corrupt, or ambiguous.

== The protocanonical and deuterocanonical books ==
The Roman Catholic and Eastern Churches canons include books, called the deuterocanonical books, whose authority was disputed by Rabbi Akiva during the first-century development of the Hebrew Bible canon, although Akiva was not opposed to a private reading of them, as he himself frequently used Sirach. One early record of the deuterocanonical books is found in the early Koine Greek Septuagint translation of the Jewish scriptures. This translation was widely used by the Early Christians, survives as the Old Testament in the early Greek pandect Bibles, and is the one most often quoted (300 of 350 quotations including many of Jesus' own words) in the New Testament when it quotes the Old Testament. Other, older versions of the texts in Hebrew, Aramaic, and Greek, have since been discovered among the Dead Sea scrolls and the Cairo Geniza. Nevertheless, the exact content of none of the surviving early Christian Old Testament Greek codex agrees exactly with any of the others, so there is no single definitive list.

The traditional explanation of the development of the Old Testament canon describes two sets of Old Testament books, the protocanonical and the deuterocanonical books. According to this, some Church Fathers accepted the inclusion of the deuterocanonical books based on their inclusion in the Septuagint (most notably Augustine), while others disputed their status based on their exclusion from the Hebrew Bible (most notably Jerome). Michael Barber argues that this time-honored reconstruction is grossly inaccurate and that "the case against the apocrypha is overstated". Augustine simply wanted a new version of the Latin Bible based on the Greek text since the Septuagint was widely used throughout the churches and translation process could not rely on a single person (Jerome) who could be fallible; he in fact held that the Hebrew and the Septuagint were both equally inspired, as stated in his City of God 18.43-44. For most Early Christians, the Hebrew Bible was "Holy Scripture" but was to be understood and interpreted in the light of Christian convictions.

While deuterocanonical books were referenced by some fathers as Scripture, men such as Athanasius held that they were for reading only and not to be used for determination of doctrine. Athanasius includes the Book of Baruch and the Letter of Jeremiah in the list of the Canon of the Old Testament, and excludes the Book of Esther. According to the Catholic Encyclopedia, "the inferior rank to which the deuteros were relegated by authorities like Origen, Athanasius, and Jerome, was due to too rigid a conception of canonicity, one demanding that a book, to be entitled to this supreme dignity, must be received by all, must have the sanction of Jewish antiquity, and must moreover be adapted not only to edification, but also to the 'confirmation of the doctrine of the Church', to borrow Jerome's phrase." St. Augustine's main requirement for canonical status was determining whether the book was read publicly as scripture by a church. This also impacted his view on comparing different canon lists as different churches had different lectionaries.

Following Martin Luther, Protestants regard the deuterocanonical books as apocryphal (non-canonical). According to J. N. D. Kelly, "It should be observed that the Old Testament thus admitted as authoritative in the Church… always included, though with varying degrees of recognition, the so-called Apocrypha or deuterocanonical books."

== Bryennios List ==
After Melito's canon (ca 170), perhaps the earliest reference to a Christian canon is the Bryennios List which was found by Philotheos Bryennios in the Codex Hierosolymitanus in the library of the monastery of the Church of the Holy Sepulchre in 1873. The list is written in Koine Greek letters, transcribing Aramaic or Hebrew names, each with a corresponding book title from the Greek Septuagint; and is dated to the first or early second century by Jean-Paul Audet in 1950. Some scholars believe it should be assigned a later date of 1056 AD, as written in the manuscript. Audet notes that it summarizes 27 books, which by traditional grouping forms 22 books of the canon:

1. Genesis
2. Exodus
3. Leviticus
4. Jesus Naue
5. Deuteronomy
6. Numbers
7. Judges
8. Ruth
9. Samuel–Kings
10. Chronicles
11. Two of Esdras
12. Esther
13. Psalms
14. Proverbs
15. Ecclesiastes
16. Song of Songs
17. Job
18. Minor prophets
19. Isaiah
20. Jeremiah
21. Ezekiel
22. Daniel

"Jesus (son of) Naue" was an old name for the Book of Joshua. The "Two of Esdras" are linked in the list to Esdras A and Esdras B from the surviving pandect witnesses to Septuagint, but otherwise Audet proposed that the 'further' book of Esdras in the list might have denoted an Aramaic targum. The 22 number of books is common in Jewish lists of antiquity. However, R.T. Beckwith asserts that the Bryennios list "mixes the Prophets and Hagiographa indiscriminately together, it must be of Christian rather than Jewish authorship, and since the use of Aramaic continued in the Palestinian church for centuries, there is no reason to date it so early (first or second century CE)."

== Marcion ==
Marcion of Sinope was the first Christian leader in recorded history (though later, considered heretical) to propose and delineate a uniquely Christian canon. He explicitly rejects the Old Testament and pushes his version of the New Testament to be the Christian canon. Irenaeus wrote:

Marcion [besides abolishing the prophets and the law] mutilates the Gospel that is according to Luke. ... He likewise persuaded his disciples that he himself was more worthy of credit than are those apostles who have handed down the Gospel to us, furnishing his followers not with the Gospel but merely a fragment of it. In like manner, too, he dismembered the letters of Paul. (Haer. 1.27.2)

With different perspective, Tertullian said:

Since Marcion separated the New Testament from the Old, he is necessarily subsequent to that which he separated, inasmuch as it was only in his power to separate what was previously united. Having been united previous to its separation, the fact of its subsequent separation proves the subsequence also of the man who effected the separation. (De praescriptione haereticorum 30)

Everett Ferguson, in chapter 18 of The Canon Debate, makes a note that: "[Wolfram] Kinzig suggests that it was Marcion who usually called his Bible testamentum [Latin for testament]". In the same chapter, Ferguson also says that Tertullian criticizes Marcion regarding the naming of the books in his list. According to the Catholic Encyclopedia, the Marcionites "were perhaps the most dangerous foe Christianity has ever known".

Other scholars propose that it was Melito of Sardis who originally coined the phrase "Old Testament", which is associated with Supersessionism.

== Eusebius on Melito and Origen ==
The first list of Old Testament books compiled by a Christian source is recorded by the 4th century historian Eusebius. Eusebius describes the collection of a 2nd century bishop, Melito of Sardis. Melito's list, dated to circa 170, the result of a trip to the Holy Land (probably the famous library at Caesarea Maritima) to determine both the order and number of books in the Hebrew Bible, instead seems to follow the order of the books presented in the Septuagint. Melito's list, as cited by Eusebius, as follows:

Of Moses, five books: Genesis, Exodus, Numbers, Leviticus, Deuteronomy; Jesus Nave, Judges, Ruth; of Kings, four books; of Chronicles, two; the Psalms of David, the Proverbs of Solomon, Wisdom also, Ecclesiastes, Song of Songs, Job; of Prophets, Isaiah, Jeremiah; of the twelve prophets, one book; Daniel, Ezekiel, Esdras.

According to Archibald Alexander, "Wisdom" in Melito's list is thought by many to be referring to the Book of Wisdom, which is part of the Deuterocanon, but which others dispute. Book of Esther does not appear in the list.

Eusebius also records 22 canonical books of the Hebrews given by Origen of Alexandria:

The twenty-two books of the Hebrews are the following: That which is called by us Genesis; Exodus; Leviticus; Numbers; Jesus, the son of Nave (Joshua book); Judges and Ruth in one book; the First and Second of Kings (1 Samuel and 2 Samuel) in one; the Third and Fourth of Kings (1 Kings and 2 Kings) in one; of the Chronicles, the First and Second in one; Esdras (Ezra–Nehemiah) in one; the book of Psalms; the Proverbs of Solomon; Ecclesiastes; the Song of Songs; Isaiah; Jeremiah, with Lamentations and the epistle (of Jeremiah) in one; Daniel; Ezekiel; Job; Esther. And besides these there are the Maccabees.

Origen's list excludes the Twelve Minor Prophets, apparently by accident; but includes the Epistle of Jeremiah (perhaps referring Baruch as an appendix to Jeremiah) and the Maccabees, which disputation exists whether the Hebrews of his day regarded the Maccabees as canonical or not. For Origen himself quotes Maccabees and the rest of the related apocryphal books continuously throughout his writings as scripture and testifies that the churches use books which the Hebrews do not. Origen also refers to doubts about the canonicity of the book of Wisdom.

== Manuscripts ==
The books of the Hebrew Bible had been conventionally recorded on scrolls, commonly a separate scroll for each book; except for the twelve Minor Prophets which were always written as a single scroll. But the developing technology of the codex had, by the beginning of the 4th century CE, advanced to the point where it had become possible to gather the whole of the Christian Old Testament, and indeed the entire bible, into a single manuscript book called a 'pandect bible'.

Pandect volumes in the subsequent centuries, up to the ninth century, demonstrate how the formal canon lists of Christian scriptures were applied in practice. Altogether, seven (relatively complete) Greek manuscripts of the whole bible now survive, with a further two relatively complete Greek manuscripts of the Old Testament. Four of these pre-date the ninth century. Pandect bible volumes were also produced for versions of the Bible (and Old Testament) in other languages. Seven complete manuscripts of the Old Testament survive in Syriac, of which three predate the ninth century. Two complete Latin Bibles survive from before the ninth century; of which one, the Codex Amiatinus is entirely in Jerome's Vulgate version, while the other, the León palimpsest mixes books with Vulgate text with others in the Old Latin version. After the 9th century, pandect bibles in the Latin West become much more common, and following the emergence of the Paris Bibles in the 13th century they are numbered in thousands, but these late medieval bibles (and all the printed editions derived from them) differ greatly in text, arrangement and contents from the Vulgate Latin bibles in their original form.

In 331, Constantine I commissioned Eusebius to deliver fifty Bibles for the Church of Constantinople. Athanasius (Apol. Const. 4) recorded Alexandrian scribes around 340 preparing Bibles for Constans. Little else is known, though there is plenty of speculation. For example, it is speculated that this may have provided motivation for canon lists, and that Codex Vaticanus and Codex Sinaiticus may be examples of these Bibles. Those codices include substantially all of the texts commonly recognised in the Septuagint; Vaticanus is only lacking 1–4 Maccabees and Sinaiticus is lacking 2–3 Maccabees. Both Vaticanus and Sinaiticus include Psalm 151; though in Vaticanus this psalm is supernumerary, while in Sinaiticus it is listed as canonical. 1 Esdras, Ezra-Nehemiah, Baruch and Letter of Jeremiah are also missing in Sinaiticus, but it cannot be determined whether this is intentional, or whether they were originally present in pages that are no longer extant.

Together with the, slightly later Codex Alexandrinus, Codex Vaticanus and Sinaiticus are the earliest extant complete Christian Bibles. Alexandrinus includes all four Books of Maccabees, both books of Esdras, Baruch and the Letter of Jeremiah; and also the Book of Odes, which is not otherwise commonly presented as canonical. Psalm 151 is retitled as 'the autobiographical Psalm 1'. There is no evidence among the canons of the First Council of Nicaea of any determination on the canon, however, Jerome (347–420), in his Prologue to Judith, makes the claim that the Book of Judith was "found by the Nicene Council to have been counted among the number of the Sacred Scriptures".

In these complete bibles:

- the books of Tobit, Judith, Wisdom of Solomon and Sirach are always included;

- except for the Codex Vaticanus, some of the books of Maccabees are always included, varying as to which;

- in the Greek and Old Latin tradition, both 1 Esdras and Ezra-Nehemiah are included separately, in the Syriac and Vulgate traditions only Ezra-Nehemiah is included;

- Ezra-Nehemiah is never split into two books, although the Codex Alexandrinus and the Syriac tradition introduce a sub-heading, "the words of Nehemiah son of Achalia" where the modern book of Nehemiah begins.

- in the Greek tradition, Baruch, Lamentations and the Letter of Jeremiah are generally distinguished as separate books; in the Syriac tradition, Lamentations is included within Jeremiah, and the other two are separate; in the Vulgate tradition, Lamentations is included within Jeremiah, and Baruch and the Letter of Jeremiah are omitted.

== Jerome and the Vulgate ==
Pope Damasus I's Council of Rome in 382, if the Decretum Gelasianum is correctly associated with it, issued a biblical canon list substantially identical with that given at Trent, or if not the list is at least a 6th-century compilation claiming a 4th-century imprimatur. He was encouraged his personal secretary, Jerome, in the Vulgate translation of the Bible. Damasus's commissioning of the Latin Vulgate edition of the Bible was instrumental in the fixation of the canon in the West. This list, given below, was purportedly endorsed by Pope Damasus I: (only shown the Old Testament part)

The order of the Old Testament begins here: Genesis, one book; Exodus, one book; Leviticus, one book; Numbers, one book; Deuteronomy, one book; Joshua Nave, one book; Judges, one book; Ruth, one book; Kings, four books (Samuel I & II, Kings I & II); Paralipomenon (Chronicles), two books; Psalms, one book; Solomon, three books: Proverbs, one book; Ecclesiastes, one book; Canticle of Canticles, one book; likewise Wisdom, one book; Ecclesiasticus, one book. Likewise the order of the prophets: ... [16 books of the prophets listed]. Likewise the order of the histories: Job, one book; Tobit, one book; Esdras, two books; Esther, one book; Judith, one book; Maccabees, two books.

In the prologue to Ezra Jerome criticises the two books of Esdras in the Septuagint as presenting a "variety of versions" (exemplaria varietas) of the same Hebrew text; Jerome consequently translated Hebrew Ezra-Nehemiah as a single book, replacing both Greek Esdras A and Esdras B. In the prologue to Ezra Jerome further rejects the "third and fourth" books of Ezra as apocryphal. These apocryphal books correspond to 3 Esdras and 4 Esdras In the same way Jerome, in his Preface of the Books of Samuel and Kings, explains the following: "To the third class belong the Hagiographa, of which the first book begins with Job, ... the eighth, Ezra, which itself is likewise divided amongst Greeks and Latins into two books; the ninth is Esther." In the Septuagint version 1 Esdras is 'Esdras A' and Ezra–Nehemiah is 'Esdras B'. In the Old Latin bible 1 Esdras it was 1 Esdras; but after Jerome, with his strong preference for the books preserved in Hebrew, had rejected it from the canon, it was usually counted as 3 Esdras.

Pope Damasus I is often considered to be the father of the Catholic canon. Purporting to date from a "Council of Rome" under Pope Damasus I in 382, the so-called "Damasian list" appended to the Decretum Gelasianum gives the same list as that which would be accepted by Canon of Trent and, though the text may in fact not be Damasian, it is at least a valuable sixth century compilation. The Oxford Dictionary of the Christian Church states that, "A council probably held at Rome in 382 under St. Damasus gave a complete list of the canonical books of both the Old Testament and the New Testament (also known as the 'Gelasian Decree' because it was reproduced by Gelasius in 495), which is identical with the list given at Trent." Albeit that users of the two lists will have differed slightly in applying them, in that the 'first book of Ezra' in the Old Latin version was commonly cited as representing the canonical book of Ezra in the 4th and 5th centuries; while the corresponding Latin version of 3 Esdras found in the Vulgate tradition in the 16th century was not to be recognised as canonical in the Council of Trent.

In his Vulgate's prologues, Jerome argued for Veritas Hebraica, meaning the truth of the Hebrew text over the Septuagint and Old Latin translations. Vulgate Old Testament included books outside of the Hebrew Bible, translated from the Greek and Aramaic, or derived from the Old Latin. His Preface to The Books of Samuel and Kings includes the following statement, commonly called the Helmeted Preface:

This preface to the Scriptures may serve as a "helmeted" introduction to all the books which we turn from Hebrew into Latin, so that we may be assured that what is not found in our list must be placed amongst the Apocryphal writings. Wisdom, therefore, which generally bears the name of Solomon, and the book of Jesus, the Son of Sirach, and Judith, and Tobias, and the Shepherd are not in the canon. The first book of Maccabees I have found to be Hebrew, the second is Greek, as can be proved from the very style.

At the request of two bishops, however, he made translations of Tobit and Judith from Hebrew texts, which he made clear in his prologues he considered apocryphal. But in his prologue to Judith, without using the word canon, he mentioned that Judith was held to be scriptural by the First Council of Nicaea. In his reply to Rufinus, he affirmed that he was consistent with the choice of the church regarding which version of the deuterocanonical portions of Daniel to use, which the Jews of his day did not include:

What sin have I committed in following the judgment of the churches? But when I repeat what the Jews say against the Story of Susanna and the Hymn of the Three Children, and the fables of Bel and the Dragon, which are not contained in the Hebrew Bible, the man who makes this a charge against me proves himself to be a fool and a slanderer; for I explained not what I thought but what they commonly say against us. (Against Rufinus, II:33 [AD 402]).

Michael Barber asserts that, although Jerome was once suspicious of the apocrypha, he later viewed them as Scripture. Barber argues that this is clear from Jerome's epistles. As an example, he cites Jerome's letter to Eustochium, in which Jerome quotes Sirach 13:2., elsewhere Jerome also refers to Baruch, the Story of Susannah and Wisdom as scripture.

== Augustine and the North African councils ==
With the exception of the Council of Rome (in 382), the Synod of Hippo (in 393), followed by the Council of Carthage (397) and the Council of Carthage (419), may be the first councils that explicitly accepted the first canon which includes the books that did not appear in the Hebrew Bible; the councils were under significant influence of Augustine of Hippo, who regarded the canon as already closed.

Canon xxxvi from the Synod of Hippo (393) records the Scriptures which is considered canonical; the Old Testament books as follows:

Genesis; Exodus; Leviticus; Numbers; Deuteronomy; Joshua the Son of Nun; The Judges; Ruth; The Kings, iv. books; The Chronicles, ii. books; Job; The Psalter; The Five books of Solomon [Proverbs, Ecclesiastes, Song of Songs, Wisdom of Solomon, and Ecclesiasticus]; The Twelve Books of the Prophets; Isaiah; Jeremiah; Ezechiel; Daniel; Tobit; Judith; Esther; Ezra, ii. books; Maccabees, ii. books.

According to Pierre-Maurice Bogaert the 'two books of Esdras' referred to 1 Esdras and Ezra-Nehemiah respectively. In The City of God 18:36 Augustine cites 1 Esdras 3:1-5:6 as part of the book of Ezra and a potential prophecy of Christ. Augustine refers to both these texts when says: "and the two of Ezra, which last look more like a sequel to the continuous regular history which terminates with the books of Kings and Chronicles." The five books of Solomon refer to Proverbs, Ecclesiastes, Song of Songs, Wisdom of Solomon, and Ecclesiasticus. The four books of Kings refer to the two books of Samuel and the two books of Kings (see Books of Kings Composition)

On 28 August 397, the Council of Carthage confirmed the canon issued at Hippo; the recurrence of the Old Testament part as stated:

Genesis, Exodus, Leviticus, Numbers, Deuteronomy, Joshua the son of Nun, Judges, Ruth, four books of Kings (Samuel I & II, Kings I & II), two books of Paraleipomena (Chronicles), Job, the Psalter, five books of Solomon [Proverbs, Ecclesiastes, Song of Songs, Wisdom of Solomon, and Ecclesiasticus], the books of the twelve prophets, Isaiah, Jeremiah, Ezechiel, Daniel, Tobit, Judith, Esther, two books of Esdras, two books of the Maccabees.

Successively the Council of Carthage (419) in its Canon 24 listed exactly the same Old Testament Canon of the previous councils:

The Canonical Scriptures are as follows: Genesis, Exodus, Leviticus, Numbers, Deuteronomy, Joshua the son of Nun, Judges, Ruth, four books of Kings [1 Samuel, 2 Samuel, 1 Kings, 2 Kings], two books of Chronicles, Job, the Psalter, five books of Solomon [Proverbs, Ecclesiastes, Song of Songs, Wisdom of Solomon, and Ecclesiasticus], the books of the twelve prophets, Isaiah, Jeremiah, Ezechiel, Daniel, Tobit, Judith, Esther, two books of Esdras (1 Esdras and Ezra-Nehemiah), two Books of the Maccabees.

Augustine of Hippo wrote in his book On Christian Doctrine (Book II Chapter 8) (397 AD) listing deuterocanonical books as canonicals:

Now the whole canon of Scripture on which we say this judgment is to be exercised, is contained in the following books:— Five books of Moses, that is, Genesis, Exodus, Leviticus, Numbers, Deuteronomy; one book of Joshua the son of Nun; one of Judges; one short book called Ruth; next, four books of Kings (the two books of Samuel and the two books of Kings), and two of Chronicles, Job, and Tobias, and Esther, and Judith, and the two books of Maccabees, and the two of Ezra ... one book of the Psalms of David; and three books of Solomon, that is to say Proverbs, Song of Songs, and Ecclesiastes... For two books, one called Wisdom and the other Ecclesiasticus. ... Twelve separate books of the prophets which are connected with one another, and having never been disjoined, are reckoned as one book; the names of these prophets are as follows: Hosea, Joel, Amos, Obadiah, Jonah, Micah, Nahum, Habakkuk, Zephaniah, Haggai, Zechariah, Malachi; then there are the four greater prophets, Isaiah, Jeremiah, Daniel, Ezekiel.

== The Synod of Laodicea ==
The Synod of Laodicea was a regional synod of approximately thirty clerics from Asia Minor that assembled about AD 363–364 in Laodicea, Phrygia Pacatiana.

The 59th canon forbade the readings in church of uncanonical books. The 60th canon listed as canonical books the 22 books of the Hebrew Bible plus the Book of Baruch and the Epistle of Jeremy.

The authenticity of the 60th canon is doubtful as it is missing from various manuscripts and may have been added later to specify the extent of the preceding 59th canon. Nevertheless, given that the Book of Revelation is excluded from the New Testament in this list, it is taken by scholars such as Gallagher and Meade to transmit a genuine canon list of 4th century date.

== Other early authors ==
Athanasius (367 AD), Cyril of Jerusalem (c. 350 AD) and Epiphanius of Salamis (c. 385 AD) listed as Canonical books the 22 books of the Tanakh plus the Book of Baruch and the Epistle of Jeremy.

Epiphanius of Salamis (c. 385 AD) in his Panarion writes that along with the Hebrew bible books Jews had in their books the deuterocanonical Epistle of Jeremiah and Baruch, both combined with Jeremiah and Lamentations in only one book.

The monk Rufinus of Aquileia (c. 400 AD) named as Canonical books the books of the Tanakh and deuterocanonical books named as "Ecclesiastical" books.

Pope Innocent I (405 AD) in a letter sent to the bishop of Toulouse cited as Canonical books the books of the Hebrew Bible plus deuterocanonical books as a part of the Old Testament Canon.

The Decretum Gelasianum which is a work written by an anonymous scholar between 519 and 553 contains a list of books of Scripture presented as having been made Canonical by the Council of Rome (382 AD). This list mentions the Hebrew Bible plus deuterocanonical books as a part of the Old Testament Canon.

Hilary of Poitiers accepted as canonical the Tanakh, but mentioned that some others add Tobit and Judith.

John of Damascus accepted as canonical the Tanakh and said that the books of Sirach and Wisdom of Solomon "are virtuous and noble, but are not counted nor were they placed in the ark."

Gregory of Nazianzus accepts the Tanakh as canonical, but omits Esther like Athanasius.

Amphilochius of Iconium accepted the Tanakh as canon, with the inclusion of the Esdras.

Apostolic Constitutions in its canon list includes Judith, the Esdras and the Maccabees along with the book of Sirach.

The Mommsen List only includes the Tanakh.

According to the Synopsis of Sacred Scripture which has an anonymous Greek author in the 6th century, makes a distinction between the Tanakh and the Deuterocanon, saying for the Deutrocanonical books that; "Thus the canonical books of the Old Testament are twenty-two, corresponding with the number of letters in the Hebrew, for they have this many elementary signs. But aside from these there are moreover some other books with the Old Testament, which are not considered canonical, but which are only read to catechumens".

== Quinisext Council and Canons of the Apostles ==
The Quinisext Council (or the Council in Trullo) in 691–692, which was rejected by Pope Sergius I and is not recognized by the Catholic Church (see also Pentarchy), endorsed the following lists of canonical writings: the Apostolic Canons (c. 385), the Synod of Laodicea (c. 363), the Third Synod of Carthage (c. 397), and the 39th Festal Letter of Athanasius (367). The Apostolic Canons (or Ecclesiastical Canons of the Same Holy Apostles, Canons of the Apostles) is a collection of ancient ecclesiastical decrees concerning the government and discipline of the Early Christian Church, first found as last chapter of the eighth book of the Apostolic Constitutions.

Canon n. 85 of the Ecclesiastical Canons of the Same Holy Apostles is a list of canonical books, includes 46 books of Old Testament canon which essentially corresponds to that of the Septuagint. The Old Testament part of the Canon n. 85 stated as follows:

"Of the Old Covenant: the five books of Moses—Genesis, Exodus, Leviticus, Numbers, and Deuteronomy; one of Joshua the son of Nun, one of the Judges, one of Ruth, four of the Kings, two of the Chronicles, two of Ezra, one of Esther, one of Judith, three of the Maccabees, one of Job, one hundred and fifty psalms; three books of Solomon—Proverbs, Ecclesiastes, and the Song of Songs; sixteen prophets. And besides these, take care that your young persons learn the Wisdom of the very learned Sirach."

Karl Josef von Hefele argues that "This is probably the least ancient canon in the whole collection"; even he and William Beveridge believe that the writings of the Apostolic Canons dating from end of the second or early of the third century, though others agree that they could not have been composed before the Synods of Antioch of 341 nor even before the latter end of the 4th century.

== Book of Baruch ==
The canonicity of the Book of Baruch represents a special case. In the Greek East, Athanasius (367 AD), Cyril of Jerusalem (c. 350 AD), and Epiphanius of Salamis (c. 385 AD) listed the Book of Baruch as canonical. Athanasius states "Jeremiah with Baruch, Lamentations, and the epistle"; the other Fathers offer similar formulations.

In the Latin West Pope Innocent I (405 AD) identifies the sixteen prophets (four major, plus 12 minor) as canonical, but does not specifically mention Baruch as associated with Jeremiah. The same is the case for the canons of the Synod of Hippo (in 393), followed by the Council of Carthage (397) and the Council of Carthage (419). All these canon lists otherwise include other Old Testament books that would later be classed as deuterocanonical. Later, Augustine of Hippo (C. 397 AD) would confirm in his book On Christian Doctrine (Book II, Chapter 8) the canonicity of the book of Jeremiah without reference to Baruch; but in his work The City of God 18:33 he discusses the text of Baruch 3: 36–38, noting that this is variously cited to Baruch and to Jeremiah; his preference being for the latter. In the decrees of the Council of Florence (1442) and the Council of Trent (1546), "Jeremias with Baruch" is stated as canonical; but the Letter of Jeremiah is not specified, being included as the sixth chapter of Baruch in late medieval Vulgate Bibles.

The Decretum Gelasianum, which is a work written by an anonymous Latin scholar between 519 and 553, contains a list of books of Scripture presented as having been declared canonical by the Council of Rome (382 AD). Again this list asserts the canonicity of Jeremiah without reference to Baruch. One early synodical decree that may mention Baruch is The Synod of Laodicea (c. 364); where a list of canonical books is variously appended to canon 59, in which Jeremiah, and Baruch, the Lamentations, and the Epistle are stated as canonical, although this canon list includes no other deuterocanonical works. This list is found in compendiums of the decrees of Laodicea circulating in the Ethiopic church, and in all later Greek compendiums; but is absent from counterpart compendiums of Laodicea circulating in the Latin, Coptic and Syriac churches; as too from some earlier Greek compendiums.

It is commonly accepted that the absence of specific mention of Baruch in early canon lists circulating in the West cannot be interpreted as an assertion that the Book of Baruch was then non-canonical, only that it is being assumed within Jeremiah; although there was also an extensive body of pseudopigraphal Baruch apocalyptic literature ( 2 Baruch, 3 Baruch, 4 Baruch), which are frequently classed in Latin lists as apocryphal. The first Christian writer to reject the biblical Book of Baruch in its entirety (whether as a separate work, or as part of Jeremiah) is Jerome. Subsequently, because the Vulgate text of Jeremiah, following Jerome, now lacked both Baruch and the Letter of Jeremiah, those Latin Fathers who favoured the Vulgate – Gregory the Great, Isidore of Seville and Bede – notably do not cite texts from either of these two books as scripture; and appear not to consider them canonical. The 7th century pandect Vulgate bible Codex Amiatinus, which was produced for presentation to the Pope as a comprehensive collection of canonical scriptures, omits both the Book of Baruch and the Letter of Jeremiah. In the 9th century these two works were reintroduced into the Vulgate Bibles produced under the influence of Theodulf of Orleans, originally as additional chapters to the Vulgate book of Jeremiah. Subsequently, and especially in the Paris Bibles of the 13th century, they are found together as a single, combined book after Lamentations. This form of text was then followed in printed Vulgate bibles of the 15th and 16th centuries, and is reflected in the biblical canon of the Council of Trent.

== Council of Florence ==
In the Council of Florence (1442 AD), a list was promulgated of the books of the Bible, including the books of Judith, Esther, Wisdom, Ecclesiasticus, Baruch and two books of the Maccabees as Canonical books:

Five books of Moses, namely Genesis, Exodus, Leviticus, Numbers, Deuteronomy; Joshua, Judges, Ruth, four books of Kings [1 Samuel, 2 Samuel, 1 Kings, 2 Kings], two of Paralipomenon [1 Chronicles, 2 Chronicles], Esdras [Ezra], Nehemiah, Tobit, Judith, Esther, Job, Psalms of David, Proverbs, Ecclesiastes, Song of Songs, Wisdom, Ecclesiasticus, Isaiah, Jeremiah, Baruch, Ezechiel, Daniel; the twelve minor prophets, namely Hosea, Joel, Amos, Obadiah, Jonah, Micah, Nahum, Habakkuk, Zephaniah, Haggai, Zechariah, Malachi; two books of the Maccabees.

== Reformation era ==
One of the tenets of the Protestant Reformation was that translations of scriptures should be based on the original languages (i.e. Biblical Hebrew and Biblical Aramaic for the Old Testament and Biblical Greek for the New Testament) rather than upon Jerome's translation into Latin, which was the Bible of the Western Church.

Out of the three branches of the Protestant Reformation the Anglicans hold the Deuterocanon in the highest regard, the Lutherans in the middle, and the Reformed in the lowest.

=== Council of Trent ===
The Council of Trent on April 8, 1546, approved the enforcement of the present Catholic Bible canon including the deuterocanonical books as an article of faith and the decision was confirmed by an anathema by vote (24 yea, 15 nay, 16 abstain).

The canonical books list is the same as produced following the Council of Florence (Session 11, 4 February 1442).

Of the Old Testament, the five books of Moses, namely,

- Genesis.
- Exodus.
- Leviticus.
- Numbers.
- Deuteronomy.
- Josue.
- Judges.
- Ruth.
- Four books of Kings;
  - First Samuel.
  - Second Samuel.
  - First Kings.
  - Second Kings.
- Two of Paralipomenon;
  - First Chronicles.
  - Second Chronicles.
- The first and second of Esdras (Ezra, Nehemiah)
- Tobias.
- Judith.
- Esther.
- Job.
- The Davidic Psalter of 150 Psalms.
- Proverbs.
- Ecclesiastes.
- The Canticle of Canticles [Song of Songs].
- Wisdom.
- Ecclesiasticus.
- Isaias.
- Jeremias, with Baruch.
- Ezechiel.
- Daniel.
- The twelve minor Prophets namely;
  - Osee.
  - Joel.
  - Amos.
  - Abdias.
  - Jonas.
  - Micheas.
  - Nahum.
  - Habacuc.
  - Sophonias.
  - Aggeus.
  - Zacharias.
  - Malachias.
- Two books of Machabees, the first and second.

At the Council, only 3 bishops voted for an explicit rejection of the books of 3 & 4 Esdras & the Prayer of Manasseh which were a part of the Old Testament of the Vulgate; the overwhelming majority of the bishops "withheld any explicit decision on these books". "The question of the books' canonical status was left theoretically open."

In November 1592, Pope Clement VIII published his revised edition of the Vulgate, referred to as the Clementine Vulgate. He moved three books not found in the canon of the Council of Trent from the Old Testament of the Sixtine Vulgate into an appendix "lest they utterly perish" (ne prorsus interirent). It was issued with the Bull Cum Sacrorum (9 November 1592) which asserted that every subsequent edition must be assimilated to it, that no word of the text could be changed, and that not even variant readings could be printed in the margin. This new official version of the Vulgate, known as the Clementine Vulgate or Sixto-Clementine Vulgate, became and remained the official Bible of the Catholic Church until the Nova Vulgata replaced it in 1979.They were included in an appendix in the original 1609/1610 Douai-Rheims Bible until being omitted entirely in the Challoner revision.

On 2 June 1927, Pope Pius XI decreed that the Comma Johanneum of the New Testament was open to dispute; on 3 September 1943, Pope Pius XII reiterated the teaching of the Church in Divino afflante Spiritu, reaffirming that Catholic translations of the Bible in vernacular languages, based on Aramaic, Greek, and Hebrew texts, had been allowed by the Church since the time of the Council of Trent.

The contents page in a complete 80 book King James Bible, listing "The Books of the Old Testament", "The Books called Apocrypha", and "The Books of the New Testament".

=== Church of England ===
The Church of England published the Thirty-Nine Articles in 1571. Which included two articles that touch on the canon accepted by the Church;

Article VI. Of the Sufficiency of the Holy Scriptures for Salvation.

Holy Scripture containeth all things necessary to salvation: so that whatsoever is not read therein, nor may be proved thereby, is not to be required of any man, that it should be believed as an article of the Faith, or be thought requisite necessary to salvation.

In the name of the Holy Scripture we do understand those Canonical books of the old and new Testament of whose authority was never any doubt in the Church.

Of the Names and Number of the Canonical Books.

- Book of Genesis.
- Book of Exodus.
- Book of Leviticus.
- Book of Numbers.
- Book of Deuteronomy.
- Book of Joshua.
- Book of Judges.
- Book of Ruth.
- The First Book of Samuel.
- The Second Book of Samuel.
- The First Book of Kings.
- The Second Book of Kings.
- The First Book of Chronicles.
- The Second Book of Chronicles.
- The First Book of Esdras.
- The Second Book of Esdras.
- The Book of Esther.
- The Book of Job.
- The Psalms.
- The Proverbs.
- Ecclesiastes, or Preacher.
- Cantica, or Songs of Solomon.
- Four Prophets the greater. (Isaiah, Jeremiah, Daniel, Ezekiel)
- Twelve Prophets the less. (Hosea, Joel, Amos, Obadiah, Jonah, Micah, Nahum, Habakkuk, Zephaniah, Haggai, Zechariah, Malachi)

And the other books (as Hierome saith) the Church doth read for example of life and instruction of manners; but yet doth it not apply them to establish any doctrine.

Such are these following: —

- The Third Book of Esdras.
- The Fourth Book of Esdras.
- The Book of Tobias.
- The Book of Judith.
- The rest of the Book of Esther.
- The Book of Wisdom.
- Jesus the Son of Sirach.
- Baruch the Prophet.
- The Song of the Three Children.
- The Story of Susanna.
- Of Bel and the Dragon.
- The Prayer of Manasses.
- The First Book of Maccabees.
- The Second Book of Maccabees.

All the books of the New Testament, as they are commonly received, we do receive and account them canonical.

Article XXXV. Of the Homilies.

The second Book of Homilies, the several titles whereof we have joined under this Article, doth contain a godly and wholesome doctrine, and necessary for these times, as doth the former Book of Homilies, which were set forth in the time of Edward the Sixth; and therefore we judge them to be read in Churches by the Ministers diligently and distinctly, that they may be understanded of the people...

The Books of Homilies, which are commended in Article XXXV quote the "other books" as Scripture and as the Word of God. Scripture readings from the Apocrypha have always been included in the lectionaries of the Church of England for Morning & Evening Prayer, and in the Offertory Sentences of Scripture in the Holy Communion Service.

According to The Apocrypha, Bridge of the Testaments:

On the other hand, the Anglican Communion emphatically maintains that the Apocrypha is part of the Bible and is to be read with respect by her members. Two of the hymns used in the American Prayer Book office of Morning Prayer, the Benedictus es and Benedicite, are taken from the Apocrypha. One of the offertory sentences in Holy Communion comes from an apocryphal book (Tob. 4: 8–9). Lessons from the Apocrypha are regularly appointed to be read in the daily, Sunday, and special services of Morning and Evening Prayer. There are altogether 111 such lessons in the latest revised American Prayer Book Lectionary [The books used are: II Esdras, Tobit, Wisdom, Ecclesiasticus, Baruch, Three Holy Children, and I Maccabees.] The position of the Church is best summarized in the words of Article Six of the Thirty-nine Articles: "In the name of Holy Scripture we do understand those canonical Books of the Old and New Testament, of whose authority there was never any doubt in the Church. . . . And the other Books (as Hierome [St. Jerome] saith) the Church doth read for example of life and instruction of manners; but yet doth it not apply them to establish any doctrine . . .":

The official Bibles of the Church of England, the Coverdale Bible, Great Bible, Bishops' Bible, Authorized Version, and Revised Version all included the Deuterocanon which is frequently omitted in modern printings that are used by Nonconformists including the Puritans and Separatists.

=== Martin Luther ===
Luther did remove the deuterocanonical books from the Old Testament of his translation of the Bible, placing them in the "Apocrypha, that are books which are not considered equal to the Holy Scriptures, but are useful and good to read". He also did many other canon-related things, including putting James, Hebrews, Jude, and Revelation into a separate grouping and questioned their legitimacy. Hence, these books are sometimes termed "Luther's Antilegomena" – a terminology that remains in use today. Current Lutheran usage expands this questioning to also include 2 Peter, 2 John, and 3 John. Luther also argued for the relocation of Esther from the Canon to the Apocrypha, since without the deuterocanonical sections, it never mentions God. Then he said: "Does it urge Christ? Yes, because it tells the story of the survival of the people from whom Christ came." As a result, Catholics and Protestants continue to use different canons, which differ in respect to the Old Testament, though Protestant Bibles traditionally print the Apocrypha as a section in between the Old Testament and New Testament and while they are regarded as non-canonical, they are deemed to be useful for instruction.

Luther, holding to concurrent Jewish and some ancient precedent, all deuterocanonical books from the Old Testament of his translation of the Bible, placed them in a section he labeled "Apocrypha" ("hidden"). In compiling his index of the Old Testament, Luther drew from the 24 books of the Hebrew Bible, which was still an open canon as late as 200 and probably even after the Catholic canon was set in 382.

To counter the growing influence of the Reformers, the fourth session of the Catholic Council of Trent in 1546 confirmed that listed deuterocanonical books were equally authoritative as the protocanonical. in the year Luther died.

=== Reformed ===
When the Puritans gained control of the Church of England, executed Archbishop William Laud, and abolished the episcopate they decreed that only the Hebrew Canon would be read and in 1647 the Westminster Confession of Faith was created to replace the unreformed thirty nine articles and which decreed a 39-book OT and 27-book NT and the extent of the canon, the others commonly labelled as "Apocrypha" were excluded. This is a distinctive of all Reformed churches, including Dutch Reformed, Congregationalists, Presbyterians, and Baptists; as well as the Anabaptists, Plymouth Brethren, Methodists and Quakers and is in their respective confessions of faith.

The Westminster Confession of Faith, published in 1647, was one of the first Reformed confessions in the English language to exclude the Apocrypha from the Bible, leading to the removal of these books in later Nonconformist Protestant Bible publications in the English-speaking world, though Lutherans and Anglicans retained these books as an intertestamental section that are regarded as non-canonical but useful for instruction.

== Eastern Orthodox canon and the Synod of Jerusalem ==
The Synod of Jerusalem in 1672 decreed the Greek Orthodox canon which is similar to the one decided by the Council of Trent. The Eastern Orthodox Church generally consider the Septuagint is the received version of Old Testament scripture, considered itself inspired in agreement with some of the Fathers, such as St Augustine, followed by all other modern translations. They use the word Anagignoskomena (Ἀναγιγνωσκόμενα "readable, worthy to be read") to describe the books of the Greek Septuagint that are not present in the Hebrew Tanakh. The Eastern Orthodox books of the Old Testament include the Roman Catholic deuterocanonical books, plus 3 Maccabees and 1 Esdras, while Baruch is divided from the Epistle of Jeremiah, making a total of 49 Old Testament books in contrast with the Protestant 39-book canon. Other texts printed in Orthodox Bibles are considered of some value (like the additional Psalm 151, and the Prayer of Manasseh) or are included as an appendix (like the Greek 4 Maccabees, and the Slavonic 2 Esdras).

The Eastern Orthodox receive as its canon the books found in the Septuagint, and in the Patristic, Byzantine, and liturgical tradition. The Synod declared the Eastern Orthodox canon as follows:

specifically, "The Wisdom of Solomon," "Judith," "Tobit," "The History of the Dragon" [Bel and the Dragon], "The History of Susanna," "The Maccabees," and "The Wisdom of Sirach." For we judge these also to be with the other genuine Books of Divine Scripture genuine parts of Scripture. For ancient custom, or rather the Catholic Church, which has delivered to us as genuine the Sacred Gospels and the other Books of Scripture, has undoubtedly delivered these also as parts of Scripture, and the denial of these is the rejection of those. And if, perhaps, it seems that not always have all of these been considered on the same level as the others, yet nevertheless these also have been counted and reckoned with the rest of Scripture, both by Synods and by many of the most ancient and eminent Theologians of the Universal Church. All of these we also judge to be Canonical Books, and confess them to be Sacred Scripture.

Not all books of the Old Testament are covered in the Prophetologion, the official Old Testament lectionary: "Because the only exposure most Eastern Christians had to the Old Testament was from the readings during services, the Prophetologion can be called the Old Testament of the Byzantine Church."
