= Paralipomena =

Paralipomena (Greek neuter past participle plural; "things omitted") may refer to:

- Paralipomenon, a Greek name for the Old Testament Books of Chronicles
- Paralipomena of Jeremiah (4 Baruch), pseudepigraphicon attributed to the prophet Baruch
  - Rest of the Words of Baruch, a version of 4 Baruch included in the Ethiopic version of Säqoqawä Eremyas (Lamentations)
- Paralipomena Orphica, 1970 essay by Harry Mulisch
- Parerga and Paralipomena (or Accessories and Postscripts), 1851 work by philosopher Arthur Schopenhauer
- Paralipomeni della Batracomiomachia, 1835 satirical sequel by Giacomo Leopardi to Homer's Batrachomyomachia (Battle of Frogs and Mice)
- Paralipomena: Remains of Gospels and Sayings of Christ, Rev. Bernhard Pick 1908. Pick uses the word in the title but not in the text, to refer to extra-canonical sayings of Jesus.
- Paralipomena, the final chapter in Theodor Adorno's Aesthetic Theory

== See also ==
- Paraliomera, a genus of crab
