= Rest of the Words of Baruch =

Old Testament text of the Beta Israel

- Genesis: Bereshit
- Exodus: Shemot
- Leviticus: Wayiqra
- Numbers: Bemidbar
- Deuteronomy: Devarim

The Rest of the Words of Baruch, also known as the Ethiopic Lamentations of Jeremiah (Geʽez: Säqoqawä Eremyas), is a pseudepigraphic text, belonging to the Old Testament canons of the Beta Israel and Ethiopian Orthodox Church. It is not considered canonical by any other Judeo-Christian-Islamic groups.

== Contents ==
This Ethiopic text, first edited by August Dillmann in 1866, consists of eleven chapters:

Chapter	Content
1–5	Lamentations 1–5
6	Letter of Jeremiah to the Captives (1 Baruch 6)
7:1–5	Prophecy of Jeremiah against Pashhur
7:6–11:63	Paralipomena of Jeremiah (4 Baruch)

== See also ==
- 4 Baruch
- Beta Israel: §Texts
- Ethiopian canon: §List of books
