= Transfiguration (religion) =

Experience of momentary divine radiance

In a religious context, transfiguration (from the Latin transfiguratio) refers to an experience of temporary divine radiance or light. It is often viewed as a form of apotheosis, in which a human being assumes or reveals a divine or elevated nature.

== In the Christian scriptures and tradition ==
=== Jesus ===
The Transfiguration of Jesus is a key event in Christian tradition, described in the Gospels of Matthew, Mark, and Luke. It recounts the moment when Jesus, accompanied by three of his disciples — Peter, James, and John — ascends a mountain. There, Jesus is transfigured before them, with his face and clothing shining like the sun, and he is joined by the prophets Moses and Elijah. This event is considered a revelation of Jesus' divine nature and is interpreted as a foretaste of his glorification in the resurrection. The Transfiguration is also seen as a confirmation of his identity as the Son of God and a moment of divine affirmation in the presence of the disciples.

=== Jacob ===
In the Ladder of Jacob, at the conclusion of this instruction, instead of simply being given the new name Israel, Jacob is introduced to his heavenly counterpart, the angel Israel.

=== Enoch ===
In the Book of Enoch, when Enoch returns to Earth, he tells his children that although they see him as the earthly, human Enoch, there is likewise an angelic Enoch (Metatron) that has stood in the Lord's Presence.

=== Elijah ===
In the departure of Elijah to heaven by chariot of fire, and horses of fire and lifted up by a whirlwind to heaven.

=== Mary ===
Lumen gentium states that "the Immaculate Virgin [...] was exalted by the Lord as Queen of the universe, that she might be the more fully confirmed to her Son, the Lord of lords and the conqueror of sin and death".

== In Buddhism ==
The Buddha is said to have been twice transfigured, at the moment of his enlightenment and at the moment of his death.

== Transfiguration in a non-religious context ==
In a broader, non-religious context, transfiguration can refer to a profound change in appearance, character, or state. This transformation is often metaphorical, symbolizing a shift in perception, identity, or understanding. Unlike religious transfiguration, which often involves a direct connection with the divine or supernatural, secular interpretations of transfiguration focus more on personal growth, artistic expression, or philosophical change.

=== Psychological and Personal Transformation ===
In psychology, transfiguration can be used to describe a significant personal transformation, where an individual undergoes a profound shift in consciousness or identity. This might occur through experiences such as self-realization, therapeutic breakthroughs, or periods of intense emotional or intellectual development. In this sense, transfiguration can represent a "rebirth" or a change in worldview, often marked by a newfound clarity or enlightenment about one's life and purpose.

=== Literary and artistic symbolism ===
In literature and the arts, transfiguration is often used as a metaphor to describe the process by which characters or concepts evolve, particularly in works dealing with themes of personal growth, redemption, or transformation. Writers and artists may use the term to symbolize the metamorphosis of a character's soul, the development of their inner self, or their shift from innocence to experience. This metaphorical use can be found in novels, poetry, and visual arts, where the transformation of a subject is both literal and symbolic.

For example, in the works of Franz Kafka, particularly The Metamorphosis, the protagonist undergoes a physical transfiguration, turning into a giant insect. This transformation, while fantastical, is symbolic of his alienation and internal struggle, reflecting the way people can experience deep existential crises and personal transformations.

=== Scientific or biological perspectives ===
In biology, the term transfiguration can be used to describe a significant and observable transformation within an organism. A familiar example is metamorphosis, the process by which certain animals, such as butterflies or frogs, undergo dramatic changes in form and function. While "transfiguration" is not the standard scientific term, the concept of a complete transformation can align with how some species change from one state to another, often signifying growth or maturity.

=== Philosophical and cultural change ===
In philosophy, particularly in discussions of identity and existence, transfiguration can refer to a shift in an individual's understanding of the self or the world. This can occur through the process of self-examination, intellectual inquiry, or exposure to new ideas. Philosophers like Friedrich Nietzsche or Jean-Paul Sartre have written about the transformation of human nature and perception, exploring how individuals may transcend their previous understanding of life, society, or their own identity.

In some cultural contexts, transfiguration is understood as a societal or collective transformation. This could involve significant cultural shifts, revolutions, or movements where societal values or norms undergo radical change. The transfiguration of social or political landscapes may be seen in the rise of new ideologies or the breakdown of old systems, signaling a cultural reawakening or shift in collective consciousness.
