= Prophet Jonah (Michelangelo) =

Fresco on the Sistine Chapel ceiling

The Prophet Jonah
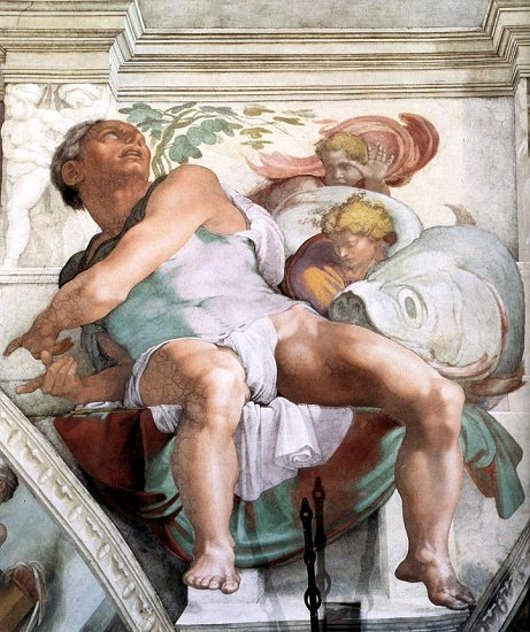
- Artist: Michelangelo
- Year: circa 1508–1512
- Type: Fresco
- Dimensions: 390 cm × 380 cm (150 in × 150 in)
- Location: Sistine Chapel, Vatican Palace; Vatican City

The Prophet Jonah is one of the seven Old Testament prophets painted by the Italian High Renaissance master Michelangelo on the Sistine Chapel ceiling in the Vatican Palace of Vatican City.

Between 1508 and 1512, under the patronage of Pope Julius II, the artist Michelangelo painted the chapel's ceiling, a project that changed the course of Western art and is regarded as one of the major artistic accomplishments of human civilization. These frescoes portray various scenes from the Old Testament of the Christian Bible, including The Creation of Adam, the life of Noah, and seven major and minor prophets, of whom one is Jonah.

This particular fresco is painted above the High Altar. Art historians generally interpret this prime position as being because the story of Jonah (who was swallowed for three days by a large fish before being miraculously restored) was seen as prefiguring that of Christ's death and resurrection.

The Prophet Jonah is opposite the fresco of the prophet Zachariah.

Behind the figure of Jonah, Michelangelo has painted a large fish (a tarpon), a reference to the fact that in the Book of Jonah, Jonah is swallowed by one.

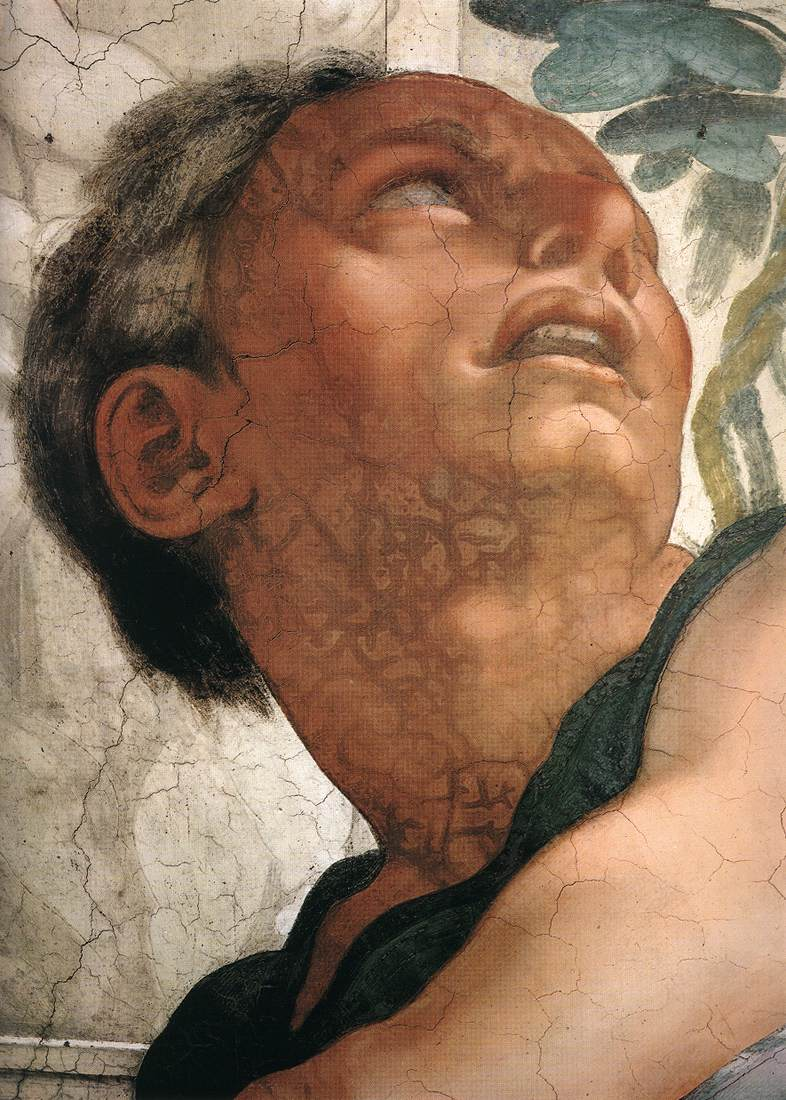
A close-up of the face of the central figure

== See also ==
- Book of Jonah, the Biblical story of the prophet
- List of works by Michelangelo
