= Melito's canon =

2nd century biblical canon

Melito's canon is the biblical canon attributed to Melito of Sardis, one of the early Church Fathers of the 2nd century.

== Earliest Christian canon of the Old Testament ==
Melito provides what is possibly the earliest known Christian canon of what he termed the "Old Testament", having traveled to Palestine (probably to the library at Caesarea Maritima) seeking to acquire accurate information about which books should be accepted as canonical. Other candidates for earliest Christian canon include the Bryennios List and the Muratorian fragment.

== Eusebius' record of Melito ==
Melito's canon is found in Eusebius EH4.26.13–14:

Accordingly when I went East and came to the place where these things were preached and done, I learned accurately the books of the Old Testament, and send them to thee as written below. Their names are as follows: Of Moses, five books: Genesis, Exodus, Numbers, Leviticus, Deuteronomy; Jesus Nave, Judges, Ruth; of Kings, four books; of Chronicles, two; the Psalms of David, the Proverbs of Solomon, Wisdom also, Ecclesiastes, Song of Songs, Job; of Prophets, Isaiah, Jeremiah; of the twelve prophets, one book; Daniel, Ezekiel, Esdras. From which also I have made the extracts, dividing them into six books.

== Canon features ==
Melito's list almost fully corresponds to the Jewish Tanakh and Protestant canon.

Melito's canon includes a book of "Wisdom". Scholars disagree whether this is an alternate name for the Book of Proverbs, or a reference to the Book of Wisdom.

Some think the omission of the Book of Esther was accidental, but most scholars think it was intentional.

Nehemiah and Lamentations are also not mentioned, but the former is thought to be part of Ezra (being referred to as Esdras), and Lamentations being part of Jeremiah.

Most scholars think it probable that Melito intended to present a list of 22 books, which was common for Hebrew bible canon lists before and after Melito.

The list places the Book of Numbers before Leviticus, the opposite order of most canon lists. This is a feature also found in the Cheltenham List and de Sectis. This is a feature of Melito's canon, and not an error by Eusebius or his copyists.
