= Apocalypse of Abraham =

Ancient Jewish text dating to 70–150 AD

The Apocalypse of Abraham is an apocalyptic Jewish pseudepigrapha (a text whose claimed authorship is uncertain) based on biblical Abraham narratives. It was probably composed in the first or second century, between 70–150 AD.

It has survived only in Old Slavonic recensions. It is not regarded as scripture by Jews or Christians, but it was a scripture for the now-extinct Bogomil sect.

== Manuscript tradition ==
The text of the Apocalypse of Abraham has been preserved only in Slavonic; it occurs in the Tolkovaja Paleja (or Explanatory Paleja, a medieval compendium of various ancient Jewish texts and comments that also preserved the Ladder of Jacob). The original language of this text was almost certainly Hebrew: it was translated into Slavonic either directly from Hebrew or from a lost intermediate Greek translation. The whole text survives in six manuscripts usually gathered in two families: the main manuscript of the first family is referred to as S edited by Tixonravov in 1863, while the main manuscripts of the other family, which preserve the text integrated in other material of the Tolkovaja Paleja, are referred to as A, B and K.

The first English translation was produced by E.H. Anderson and R.T. Haag, and appeared in 1898 in the Latter-day Saint magazine Improvement Era, under the title The Book of the Revelation of Abraham. Another notable English translation was produced by G.H. Box and J.I. Landsman some twenty years later.

== Date ==
The Apocalypse of Abraham is typically dated between 70 and 150. The text must post-date 70 due to its knowledge of the destruction of the temple in 70 AD most prominently in the twenty-seventh chapter.

Relative to other literature, the Apocalypse appears to postdate the Book of Jubilees, but is quoted by the author of the Clementine Recognitions (i. 32–33), a text composed in the mid-fourth century and acting as the earliest extant source that can be reliably said to have known of the Apocalypse. For this reason and in comparison with other apocalyptic texts, the text in its current form is usually considered to be written before 150 (or generally, the middle of the second century). Within the usually accepted range of 70–150 AD, several scholars have posited dates that come soon after the destruction of the temple.

The text contains some suspected interpolations of Bogomil origin, principally 20:5.7, 22:5, 9:7, and 23:4-10 according to Rubinkiewicz, though this position has been disputed by Sacchi.

== Content ==
=== Section 1 (chapters 1 to 8) ===
The first eight chapters of the book are introductory in nature. Abraham's younger life is set out. This contains an account of Abraham's conversion from polytheism to monotheism, quite apart from the apocalypse which follows. The work is notable for its didactic presentation of the ills of idolatry.

- The text opens with a description of Abraham helping his father Terah, who is a maker of idols. Abraham's doubts about idol-worship are awakened by accidents that break the stone image of Merumath, and five other idols, that Abraham was supposed to sell. Pondering over this, he remonstrates with his father concerning such idols, inciting Terah's anger. Abraham tests further the powers of the idols by placing a wooden statue of Barisat near the fire, and telling the idol to take care of the fire. On returning, he finds Barisat burnt. He again strongly explains to his father the uselessness of such idols, but without results (chapters 1–6).
- The fire, the water, the earth, and the heavenly bodies are shown to be more worthy than the idols, although each one of these elements is subject to another force, so none of them can claim to be God (chapter 7, perhaps a later addition).
- Abraham is still considering his father's answer, when he hears a voice from heaven asking him to leave his father's house. He has scarcely left when a fire descends and burns Terah's house (chapter 8).

=== Section 2 (chapters 9 to 14) ===
The apocalyptic section begins with Abraham's sacrifice to God, expanding and modifying the Biblical narrative of Genesis 15:8–17:

- The voice of God orders Abraham to prepare a sacrifice on the high mountain (Mount Horeb) where he will receive a revelation. Abraham is asked to prepare for forty days for the event. The angel Yahoel is sent to Abraham, terrified of the experience, to guide him and to teach him how to perform the sacrifice. Yahoel introduces himself as a being "whose name is like unto that of God Himself", followed by a long introduction of his duties (chapters 9–11).
- On Mount Horeb, under the guidance of Yahoel, and assisted by many other angels, Abraham offers up his sacrifice, but not without being disturbed by Azazel, the fallen archangel and seducer of mankind. Azazel, in the form of an unclean bird, swoops down upon the carcasses, and, speaking with a human voice, tries to persuade Abraham to leave the holy place. Abraham is not seduced and Yahoel fights off Azazel. Yahoel then adds that the celestial garments, originally set aside for Azazel, now belong to Abraham (chapters 11–14).

=== Section 3 (chapters 15 to 32) ===
The third part of the Apocalypse of Abraham narrates the ascension of Abraham to heaven:

- Abraham and Yahoel, borne by a dove, ascend to the heavens; they see a great light and a great crowd in the likeness of men that are changing in aspect, running, prostrating, and crying aloud, and a fire comes toward them. They kneel down and worship the fire and a divine voice is heard, as the sound of rushing waters. Yahoel teaches Abraham a hymn of praise to sing, by which they ask the Lord to accept their prayer and the sacrifice made by the Lord himself. When they reach the seventh heaven, Abraham sees a classic example of Merkabah: the throne of God (but he does not see God), the four Living Beings with aspects of man, lion, ox, and eagle, and the many-eyed wheels. Yahoel has the task of mitigating the rivalry among the Living Beings (chapters 15–18).
- Abraham is shown by God everything that exists in the heavens: the angels, the celestial bodies, and the earth, and everything that is moving upon it. He sees also the Leviathan and its possessions in the nethermost waters, the rivers and their origin, and the Garden of Eden. He realizes it is the whole creation as designed by God before God decreed it to exist (chapters 19–22).
- He sees the scene of the Fall: Adam and Eve as huge figures who are beguiled to commit sin by Azazel through his causing them to eat from the forbidden fruit (here said to be a grape from the vine). Abraham asks God why he would allow man to be corrupted by Azazel, and God replies that those who do evil have chosen to do so – which is hated by God – and they have been given over to Azazel. Abraham then asks God why has he allowed that evil should be desired in the hearts of men (chapter 23).
- God tells Abraham that he has allowed man to desire evil because he is angered by the treatment on Earth of Abraham's descendants as God's chosen people, and instructs Abraham to look again at the scene before him to see the judgment of man. He sees Cain and the "slaughtered Abel, (and) the destruction brought and caused upon him through the lawless one." He sees Impurity, Theft, and Desire as personified sins, and the destruction wrought by each (chapter 24).
- Abraham then sees a scene of idolatry with boys being slaughtered, and God explains that it is his Temple and his priesthood full of his anger against the people who came out from Abraham. A vision of the destruction of the Temple follows, and it is explained to Abraham that this is due to the sin of idolatry on the part of his seed, but the coming of men who will take care of his seed is also predicted (chapters 25–27).
- Answering how long the judgment lasts, God reveals a description of the End Times: the Age is said to be divided into twelve parts; a character known simply as “a man” will appear from the pagan side, worshipped by many pagans, Jews, and by Azazel, and insulted and beaten by other Jews; ten plagues will occur; and finally, at the sound of the trumpet, the Chosen One (the Messiah) will be sent to fight the enemies, and the judgment will pass upon the heathen and the wicked. The book is closed by a short promise of the chosen people's deliverance from oppression (chapters 28–32).

== Characters ==
=== Yahoel ===
Yahoel (or Iaoel) in the Apocalypse of Abraham is the mighty angel sent to guide Abraham. Yahoel introduces himself as a being possessed of the power of the Ineffable Name "whose name is like unto that of God Himself". As the angel nearer to God, or perhaps as a manifestation of the power of God himself, Yahoel is said to be also the heavenly choirmaster, the one who teaches the angels their hymn, who has the control over "the threats and attacks of the reptiles", the angel with the chief task of protecting and watching over Israel. These functions were traditionally ascribed to Michael and mark the gradual transformation of Michael, originally the guardian angel of Israel, into Meṭaṭron. Yahoel's body is depicted as being like sapphire, his face like chrysolite, his hair like snow, his turban like the appearance of the rainbow, and his garments as purple, with a golden sceptre in his right hand. Iaoel and Yahoel have been used also as alternate names for Metatron.

=== Azazel ===
In the Apocalypse of Abraham, Azazel is portrayed as an unclean bird which comes down upon the sacrifice which Abraham, the Biblical patriarch, has prepared. This is in reference to Genesis 15:11, "Birds of prey came down upon the carcasses, and Abram drove them away".

And the unclean bird spoke to me and said, "What are you doing, Abraham, on the holy heights, where no one eats or drinks, nor is there upon them food for men. But these all will be consumed by fire and ascend to the height, they will destroy you." And it came to pass when I saw the bird speaking I said this to the angel: "What is this, my lord?" And he said, "This is disgrace, this is Azazel!" And he said to him, "Shame on you Azazel! For Abraham's portion is in heaven, and yours is on earth, for you have selected here, (and) become enamored of the dwelling place of your blemish. Therefore the Eternal Ruler, the Mighty One, has given you a dwelling on earth. Through you the all-evil spirit [is] a liar, and through you (are) wrath and trials on the generations of men who live impiously." – Apocalypse of Abraham 13:4–9

The Apocalypse of Abraham also associates Azazel with Hell. Abraham says to him, "May you be the firebrand of the furnace of the earth! Go, Azazel, into the untrodden parts of the earth. For your heritage is over those who are with you" (14:5–6). There is also the idea that God's heritage (the created world) is largely under the dominion of evil. It is "shared with Azazel" (20:5). Azazel is also identified with the serpent which tempted Eve. His form is described as a dragon with "hands and feet like a man's, on his back six wings on the right and six on the left." (23:7)

=== "A man" in Chapter 29 ===
The Apocalypse of Abraham is concerned with the future of the Jewish nation, Israel. In Chapter 29, an ambiguous character known simply as "a man" appears. In later Christian interpretation, he is usually equated with an Antichrist, the "man of sin". The text tells us that some worship this man, while others revile him. He is worshiped even by Azazel. Apparently, the man has the task of offering some kind of remission for the heathens in the end of days.

Jacob Licht (Professor of Biblical Studies, Tel-Aviv University) writes:

The most obvious and perhaps the correct explanation of this passage is to declare it a late Christian interpolation, yet "the man" does not fit the medieval Christian concept of Jesus. His function is not clearly messianic. This problematic passage therefore may have originated in some Judeo-Christian sect, which saw Jesus as precursor of the Messiah, or it may be Jewish, badly rewritten by an early Christian editor. Perhaps it reflects a Jewish view of Jesus as an apostle to the heathen, an explanation which would make it unique, and indeed startling.

== Reception ==
=== Rabbinic texts ===
The Apocalypse has a large number of close parallels with traditions that appear in the rabbinic literature. Although it is not clear if direct influence is present, it is considered that the rabbinic authors and the Apocalypse were operating in a shared interpretive framework/culture.

=== Bogomils ===
The Bogomil sect in Bulgaria made use of Slavonic texts of the Apocalypse of Abraham, the Secrets of Enoch and the Ascension of Isaiah. It is likely that the Apocalypse entered into Bulgarian tradition from Byzantium, whose Christians were copying and preserving pseudepigraphic works (like the Apocalypse) which were no longer associated with heresy and where Christian scholars believed that one could, with discernment, separate correct from corrupted material.

=== Latter-day Saints ===
In August 1898, the first portion of an English translation of the Apocalypse of Abraham (which had been made from an earlier German translation) was published, under the title The Book of the Revelation of Abraham, in the LDS Church periodical Improvement Era. The editor's note highlighted parallels with the Mormon Book of Abraham (canonised as part of the Pearl of Great Price), including the idolatry of Terah and the premortal existence of spirits. The remainder of the translation was published the following month.

Subsequent work by Latter-Day Saint apologists has also drawn attention to parallels which the Apocalypse of Abraham shows with the Visions of Moses account canonised by the LDS Church as chapter 1 of the Selections from the Book of Moses within the aforementioned Pearl of Great Price, (Note: Other Latter Day Saint denominations which canonise the Visions of Moses account may reference it differently, e.g. D&C 22 in the Community of Christ edition of the Doctrine and Covenants.) although such arguments have come under criticism for presenting resemblance to works of pseudepigrapha as evidence in favour of a text's authenticity.

== Sources ==
- R. Rubinkiewicz Apocalypse of Abraham, a new Translation and Introduction in ed. James Charlesworth The Old Testament Pseudepigrapha, Vol 1 ISBN 0-385-09630-5 (1983)
- P.Sacchi Apocalisse di Abramo in ed. P.Sacchi Apocrifi dell'Antico Testamento Vol 3 ISBN 88-394-0583-6 (1999)
- Valencia, Juan S. Hernández (January 2023). Juan Sebastián Hernández Valencia (2023). Hombres ciegos, ídolos huecos. Fetichismo y alteridad en la crítica de la idolatría del Apocalípsis de Abrahán. Medellín, Fondo Editorial Universidad Católica Luis Amigó.
