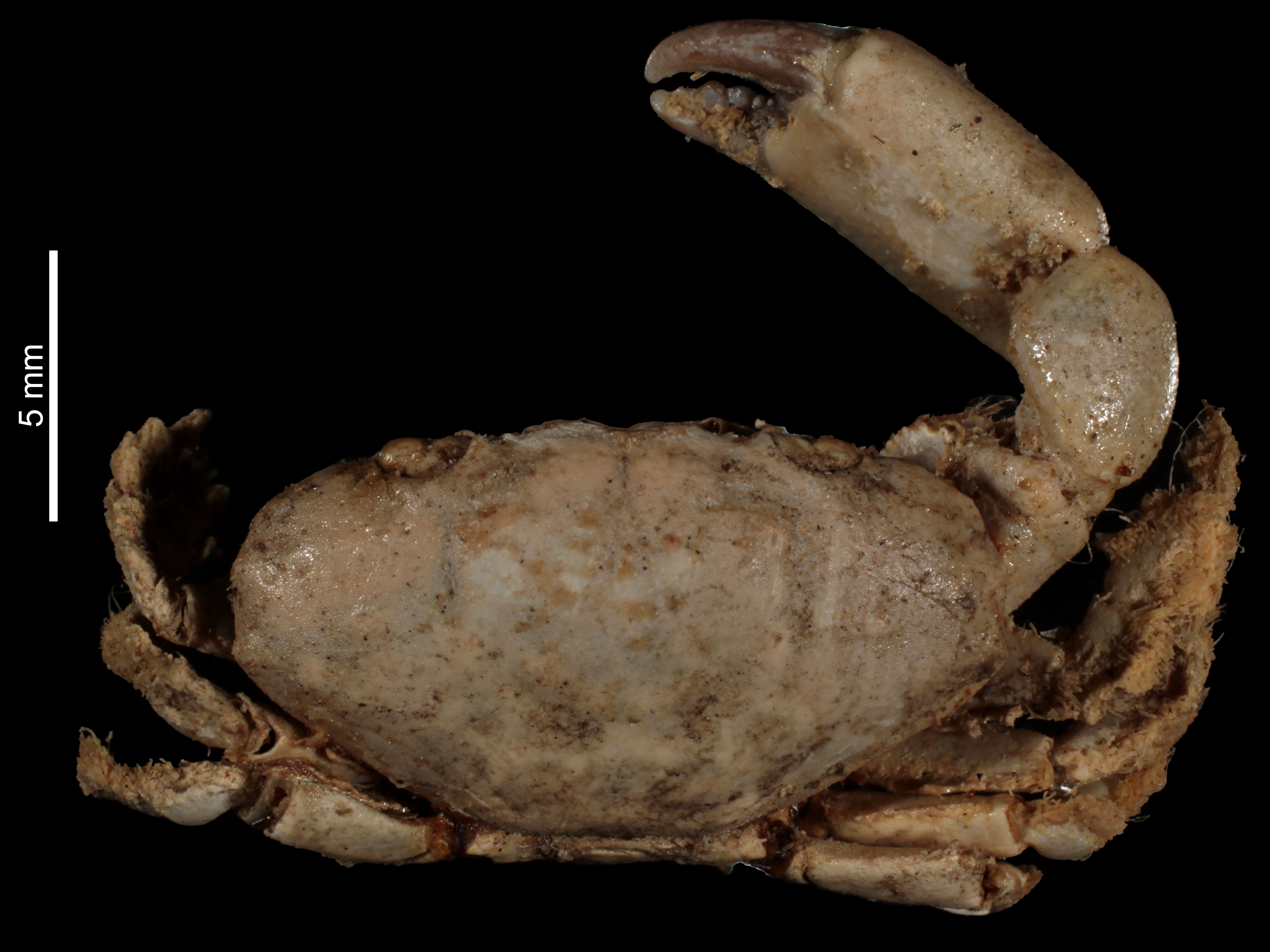
- Paraliomera longimana

Scientific classification
- Domain: Eukaryota
- Kingdom: Animalia
- Phylum: Arthropoda
- Class: Malacostraca
- Order: Decapoda
- Suborder: Pleocyemata
- Infraorder: Brachyura
- Family: Xanthidae
- Genus: Paraliomera; Rathbun, 1930

= Paraliomera =

Genus of crabs

Paraliomera is a genus of crabs in the family Xanthidae, containing the following species:

- Paraliomera dispar (Stimpson, 1871)
- Paraliomera longimana (A. Milne Edwards, 1865)
- Paraliomera macandreae (Miers, 1881)
