= Council of Laodicea =

Synod held 363–364

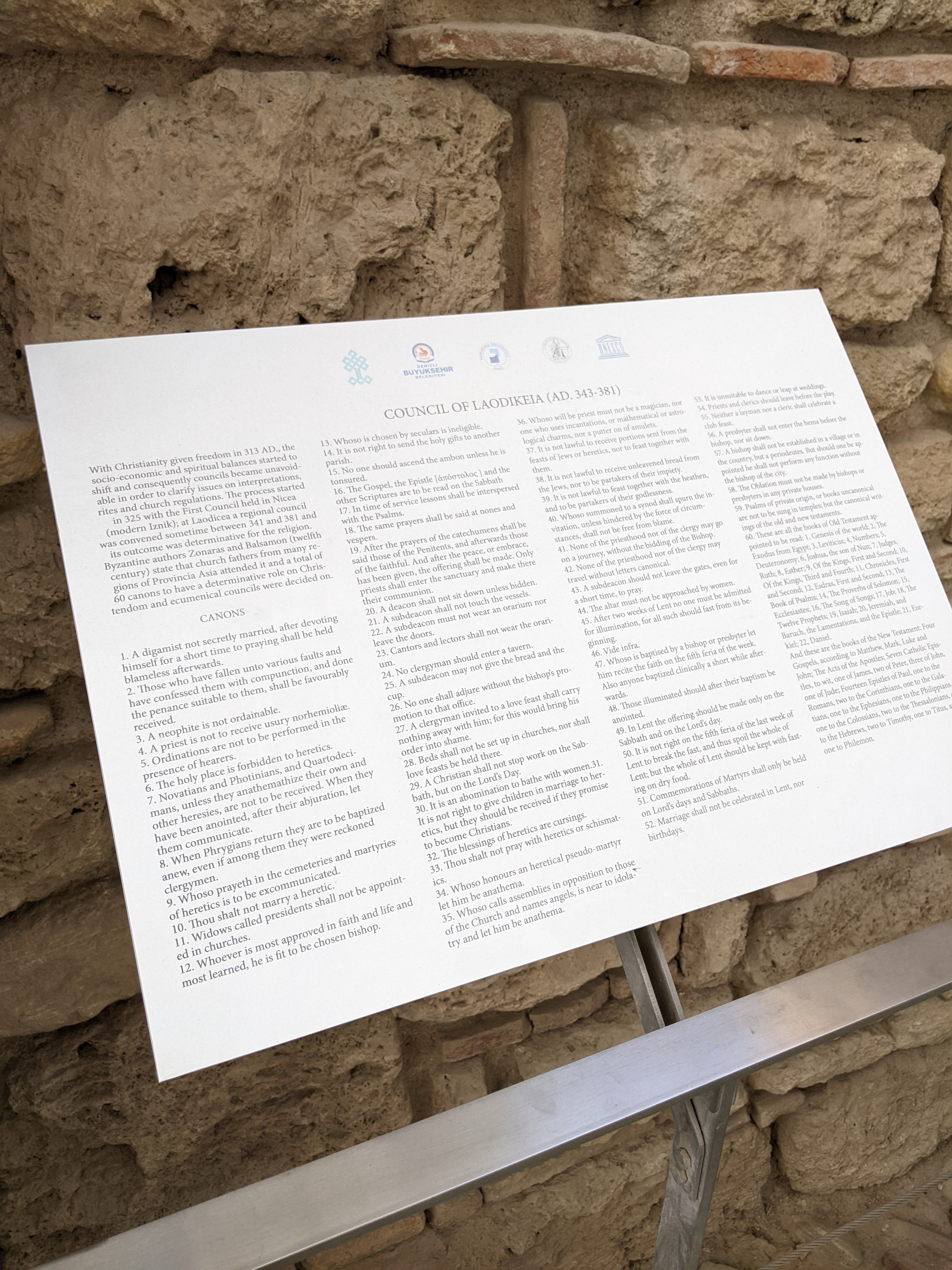
The canons of the Synod of Laodicea posted in the ruins of the central church of Laodicea

The Council of Laodicea was a regional Christian synod of approximately thirty clerics from Asia Minor which assembled about 363–364 in Laodicea, Phrygia Pacatiana.

== Historical context ==
The council took place soon after the conclusion of the war between the Roman Empire and the Persian Empire, waged by Emperor Julian. Julian, the last Constantinian emperor, attempted a revival of paganism. After his death in battle on 26 June 363, officers of the army elected the Christian Jovian as his successor. Jovian, in a precarious position, far from supplies, ended the war with Persia unfavorably for Rome. He was soon succeeded by Valentinian I, who named his brother Valens as Emperor of the East.

== Major concerns ==
The major concerns of the council involved regulating the conduct of church members. The council expressed its decrees in the form of written rules or canons. Among the sixty canons decreed, several aimed at:

- Maintaining order among bishops, clerics and laypeople (canons 3–5, 11–13, 21–27, 40–44, 56–57)
- Enforcing modest behavior of clerics and laypeople (4, 27, 30, 36, 53–55)
- Regulating approach to heretics (canons 6–10, 31–34, 37), Jews (canons 16, 37–38) and pagans (canon 39)
- Outlawing Judaizing by resting on the Sabbath (Saturday), and encouraging rest on Sunday (canon 29)
- Outlining liturgical practices (canons 14–20, 21–23, 25, 28, 58–59)
- Restrictions during lent (canons 45, 49–52)
- Admission and instruction of catechumens and neophytes (canons 45–48)
- Specifying a biblical canon (canons 59–60)
- Condemning forsaking the Church of God and invoking of Angels instead (canon 35)

== Biblical canon ==
The 59th canon forbade the readings in churches of uncanonical books. The 60th canon listed canonical books, with the New Testament containing 26 books, omitting the Book of Revelation, and the Old Testament including 22 books from the Tanakh and some deuterocanonical books as the Book of Baruch and the Epistle of Jeremiah.

The authenticity of the 60th canon is doubtful, as it is missing from various Greek manuscripts and may have been added later to specify the extent of the preceding 59th canon. The Latin version of the canons of Laodicea consistently omit the canon list. Earlier, around 350, Cyril of Jerusalem had produced a list of biblical books similar to that of the disputed 60th canon.

== Astrology ==
The council marks the first occasion in Christianity of the explicit condemnation of astrology, a matter on which theologians and legislators had not yet reached consensus.
