= Major prophet =

Grouping of books in the Old Testament

The major prophets is a grouping of books in the Christian Old Testament that does not occur in the Hebrew Bible. All of these books are traditionally regarded as authored by the prophets Isaiah, Jeremiah, Ezekiel, and Daniel. The term major prophets refers to the length of the books and not the achievement or importance of the prophets. In comparison to the books of the Twelve Minor Prophets, whose books are short and grouped together into one single book in the Hebrew Bible, the books of the major prophets are much longer.

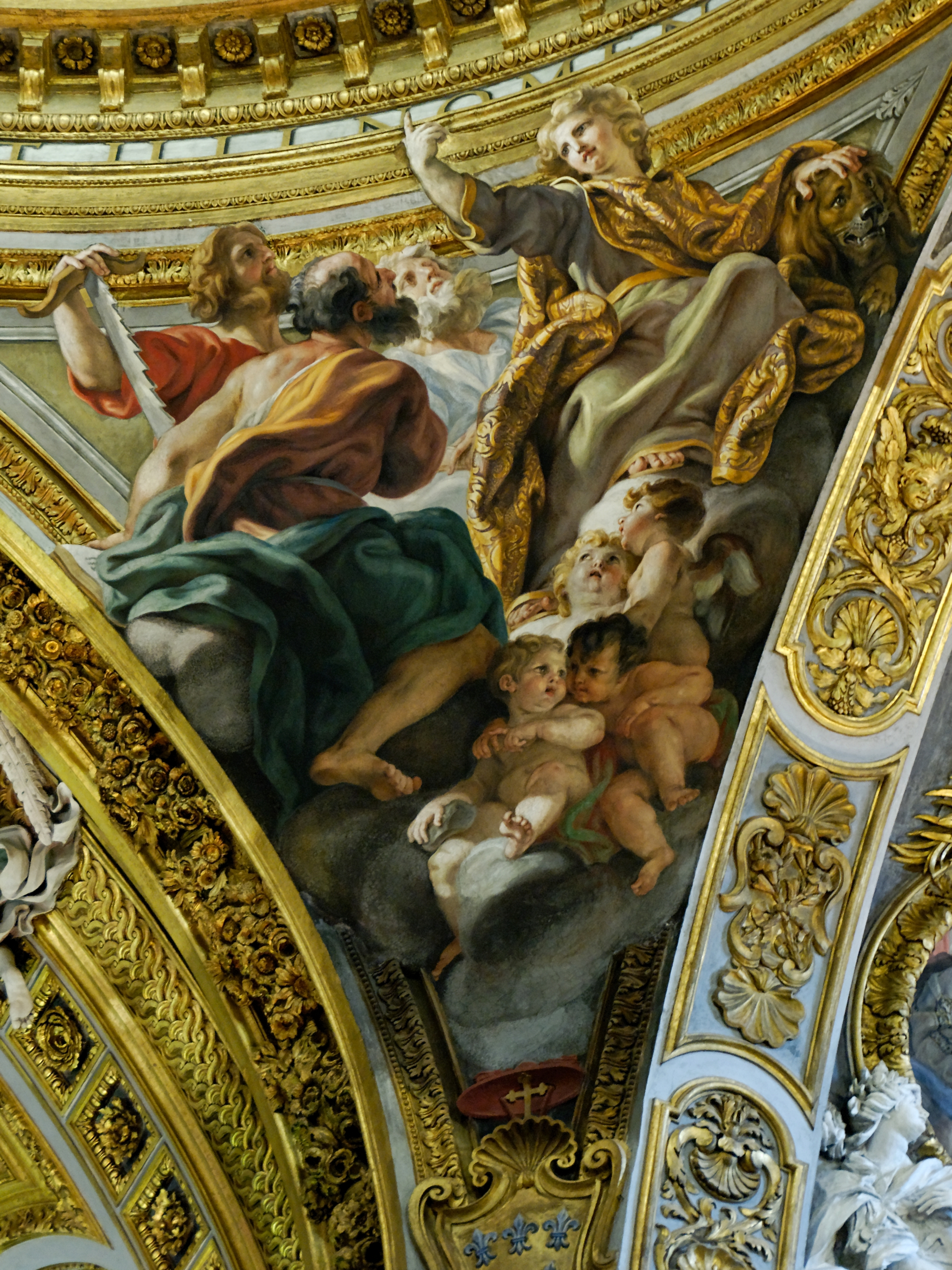
Isaiah, Jeremiah, Ezekiel, and Daniel fresco in Church of the Gesu

== The order of the books ==
=== Hebrew Bible ===
The Tanakh, often called the Hebrew Bible, is separated into three sections: the Torah, the Nevi'im (Prophets), and the Ketuvim (Writings). The Book of Isaiah, the Book of Jeremiah, and the Book of Ezekiel are included among the Nevi'im. The Book of Lamentations (attributed to Jeremiah) and the Book of Daniel are included among the Ketuvim. Neither the Book of Baruch nor the Letter of Jeremiah is included in the Hebrew Bible.

=== Catholic Bible ===
Along with the all five books in the Hebrew Bible, the Catholic Bible also includes the Book of Baruch and the Letter of Jeremiah which is found in Chapter 6 of the Book of Baruch. This book was written by Baruch ben Neriah, a scribe of Jeremiah.

=== Protestant Bible ===
Most Protestant Bibles include only the Book of Isaiah, the Book of Jeremiah, the Book of Lamentations, the Book of Ezekiel, and the Book of Daniel.

== Period of Prophecy ==
All the books of the major prophets took place during the "Period of Prophecy", which covers the time from the entrance of the Israelites into the Land of Israel until the Babylonian captivity of Judah. It is understood from all versions of the books that during this time, the four major prophets were chosen by God to be spoken to and speak the divine word to the people.

=== Isaiah ===
The Book of Isaiah tells primarily of prophecies of the judgments awaiting nations that are persecuting Judah.

=== Jeremiah ===
The Book of Jeremiah was written as a message to the Jews in exile in Babylon, explaining the disaster of exile as God's response to Israel's pagan worship.

=== Lamentations ===
The Book of Lamentations, written by Jeremiah, tells of the mourning the desertion of the city by God, its destruction, and the ultimate return of the divinity.

=== Ezekiel ===
The Book of Ezekiel tells of the judgements on Israel and the nation and also the future blessings of Israel.

=== Daniel ===
The Book of Daniel tells of God's plans to save a remnant of Israel in their present oppression, just as he saved Daniel from his enemies.

== See also ==
- Bible prophecy
- List of Biblical prophets
- Prophets in Judaism
- Prophets in Christianity
