= 2 Baruch =

Also called the Syriac Apocalypse of Baruch

2 Baruch is a Jewish apocryphal text thought to have been written in the late 1st century CE or early 2nd century CE, after the destruction of the Temple in 70 CE. It is attributed to the biblical figure Baruch ben Neriah (c. 6th century BC) and so is associated with the Old Testament, but not regarded as scripture by Jews or by most Christian groups. It is included in some ancient editions of the Peshitta. It has 87 sections (chapters).

2 Baruch is also known as the Apocalypse of Baruch or the Syriac Apocalypse of Baruch (used to distinguish it from the Greek Apocalypse of Baruch). The Apocalypse proper occupies the first 77 chapters of the book. Chapters 78–87 are usually referred to as the Letter of Baruch to the Nine and a Half Tribes.

== Manuscript tradition ==
The Letter of Baruch had a separate and wider circulation than the rest of the book, and is attested in thirty-six Syriac manuscripts.

The Apocalypse proper has been less widely available. One Latin excerpt was known from a quotation in Cyprian. A 4th–5th century CE Greek fragment was found among the Oxyrhynchus manuscripts. Two excerpts were known from 13th century lectionaries of the Syriac Orthodox Church.

The full text of 2 Baruch is now known from a 6th or 7th century CE Syriac manuscript discovered by Antonio Ceriani in the Biblioteca Ambrosiana in Milan in 1866. An Arabic manuscript of the whole text was discovered in 1974. It is apparently a rather free translation from a Syriac text similar to the Milan manuscript.

== Description ==
Although the canonical Book of Jeremiah portrays Baruch as Jeremiah's scribe, 2 Baruch portrays him as a prophet in his own right. It has a style similar to the writings attributed to Jeremiah: a mix of prayer, lamentation, and visions. Although Baruch writes of Nebuchadnezzar's sack of Jerusalem in 586 BCE, the book is currently believed to have been written in reaction to the fall of Jerusalem in 70 CE, but written before 135 CE.

The Syriac is almost certainly a translation from the Greek; the original was probably written in Hebrew. There is a close relation between the apocalypse described here and that in 2 Esdras, but critics are divided over the question of which influenced the other. The probabilities favor the hypothesis that that in 2 Baruch is an imitation of that of Esdras and therefore later. This Apocalypse of Baruch deals in part with the same problems, the sufferings of the theocratic people, and their ultimate triumph over their oppressors. Its Messianism, in general, is earthly, but in the latter part of the book the Messiah's realm tends unmistakably towards a more spiritual conception. Greater importance is attached to the law than in the related composition. Some scholars of 2 Baruch have seen in it a composite work, but the majority of critics consider it unified.

As in 2 Esdras, sin is traced to the disobedience of Adam, but different stances are taken about the hereditary nature of Adam's sin: while 2 Esdras supports it, 2 Baruch has a quite different position: "each of us has been the Adam of his own soul" (54:15).

The first part of the text is structured in triplets: three fasts, each followed by three visions and three addresses to the people. The visions are notable for their discussion of theodicy, the problem of evil, and an emphasis on predestination. According to the text, the Temple's sacred objects were rescued from destruction under the protection of angels, to be returned during the restoration prophesied in the Book of Jeremiah. The second part of the text is a long letter (known as Letter of Baruch), which many scholars believe was originally a separate document.

== Content ==
=== The Syriac Apocalypse of Baruch ===
- Chapters 1–5: God reveals to Baruch the imminent destruction of Jerusalem, and asks him leave the city along with all other pious persons. Baruch cannot understand how the name of Israel can be remembered and the promises made to Moses can come true if the Temple is in ruins. God explains that such an earthly building is not the one he showed to Adam before the Fall and to Moses on Mount Sinai and assures Baruch that Israel's woes will not be permanent. Then Baruch, Jeremiah, and all other pious ones go to the Kidron Valley, where they sorrow and fast.
- Chapters 6–8: On the following day the Chaldeans surround the city, and Baruch is carried up miraculously to the walls of Jerusalem and he sees four angels with torches firing the walls, but not before another angel has consigned the sacred vessels of the Temple to the earth, which swallows them up till the latter days.
- Chapters 9–12: Seven days after the capture of Jerusalem, Baruch again receives a revelation. He is told that Jeremiah should go with the captives to Babylon, but that he himself must remain at the ruins of Jerusalem, where God will reveal to him what shall happen at the end of days. Then Baruch sings a dirge on the destruction of Jerusalem.
- Chapters 13–20: After fasting seven days, Baruch receives a revelation concerning the future punishment of the heathen and of all godless persons; he replies to the Lord complaining about the sad fate of the men. God answers that the man was instructed in the Law and that now the time shall be sped up, referring to the end of days soon to come.
- Chapters 21–30: After another seven-day fast and long prayers, the heavens open and Baruch hears a heavenly voice. First he is blamed for the doubt and the Lord explains that "because when Adam sinned and death was decreed against those who should be born, then the multitude of those who should be born was numbered, and for that number a place was prepared where the living might dwell and the dead might be guarded", and so the "future time" will come only when the earth shall have brought forth all her fruit. Baruch demands to know when this time will arrive, and the Lord gives the first description of the "future time", explaining the twelve divisions of the time of oppression (the same divisions we find in the Ladder of Jacob), and foretelling the Messianic era of joy and the resurrection of the dead.
- Chapters 31–34: Baruch assembles the elders of the people and tells them that Zion will soon be restored, but destroyed once again, then rebuilt for all eternity.
- Chapters 35–40: Baruch, while sitting in the ruins of the Temple lamenting, receives a new revelation in the form of the following vision: in his sleep, he sees a wood surrounded by rocks and crags, and, opposite the wood, a growing vine, beneath which flows a spring. The spring runs quietly as far as the wood, where it waxes to a mighty stream, overwhelming the wood and leaving only one cedar standing. This cedar, too, is finally swept away and carried to the vine. God explains the meaning of the vision to Baruch. The wood is the mighty, fourth power (probably the Roman Empire); the spring is the dominion of the Messiah; and the vine is the Messiah himself, who will destroy the last hostile ruler on Mount Zion.
- Chapters 42–46: The fate of converts and apostates is explained to Baruch, and he is directed to warn the people and to prepare himself for another revelation. He predicts his own death to his son and the other seven elders and foretells that Israel a shall not want for a wise man nor a son of the law.
- Chapters 47–52: This central part of the Apocalypse begins with the great prayer of Baruch, full of humility in front of the majesty of God. God reveals to him the oppressions in the latter days, the resurrection, the final destiny of the righteous ("they shall respectively be transformed, the latter into the splendour of angels"), and the fate of the godless ("the former shall yet more waste away in wonder at the visions and in the beholding of the forms"). Thus Baruch understands not to grieve for those who die, but to feel joy for the present sufferance.
- Chapters 53–74: A second prophetic vision follows, whose meaning is explained by the angel Ramiel. A cloud which arises from the sea rains down twelve times, dark and bright waters alternately. This indicates the course of events from Adam to the Messiah. The six dark waters are the dominion of the godless—Adam, Ancient Egypt, Canaan, Jeroboam, Manasseh, and the Chaldeans. The six bright waters are Abraham, Moses, David, Hezekiah, Josiah, and the time of the Second Temple ("nevertheless, not fully as in the beginning"). After these twelve waters comes another water, still darker than the others and shot with fire, carrying annihilation in its wake. A bright flash puts an end to the fearful tempest. The dark cloud is the period between the time of the Second Temple and the advent of the Messiah; the latter event determines the dominion of the wicked, and inaugurates the era of eternal bliss.
- Chapters 75–77: After Baruch has thanked God for the secrets revealed to him, God asks him to warn the people, and keep himself in readiness for his translation to heaven, since God intends to keep him there until the consummation of the times. Baruch admonishes the people and also writes two letters: one to the nine and a half tribes (sent them by means of an eagle); the other to the two and a half tribes exiled in Babylon (of which no content is given).

=== The Letter of Baruch ===
- Chapters 78–87 (known also as Letter of Baruch to the Nine and One-half Tribes): the main themes of this letter are the hope for a future reward after the present suffering, the speeding up of the times, the constancy of Moses's covenant, and the freedom of man to follow God.

== See also ==
- 1 Baruch, the deuterocanonical Book of Baruch
- 3 Baruch, or the Greek Apocalypse of Baruch
- 4 Baruch, or the Paralipomena of Jeremiah

== General and cited references ==
- P. Bettiolo Apocalisse Siriana di Baruc in ed. P.Sacchi Apocrifi dell'Antico Testamento Vol 2 ISBN 978-88-02-07606-5 (2006)
- A. F. J. Klijn Syriac Apocalypse of) Baruch, a new Translation and Introduction in James Charlesworth (ed.), The Old Testament Pseudepigrapha, Vol 1 ISBN 0-385-09630-5 (1983)
- F. Leemhuis, A. F. J. Klijn, G. J. H. van Gelder The Arabic Text of the Apocalypse of Baruch: Edited and Translated with a Parallel Translation of the Syriac Text ISBN 90-04-07608-5 (1986)
- Herbermann, Charles, ed. (1913). "Baruch" . Catholic Encyclopedia. New York: Robert Appleton Company.
