= 3 Baruch =

Non-canonical religious text

3 Baruch or the Greek Apocalypse of Baruch is a visionary, pseudepigraphic text written some time between the fall of Jerusalem in 70 AD and the third century. Scholars disagree on whether it was written by a Jew or a Christian, or whether a clear distinction can be made in this era. It is one of the pseudepigrapha attributed to Baruch ben Neriah, the scribe of Jeremiah in the 6th-century BC. It does not form part of the biblical canon of either Jews or Christians. It survives in certain Greek manuscripts, and also in a few Old Church Slavonic ones.

== Content ==
Like 2 Baruch, this Greek Apocalypse of Baruch describes the state of Jerusalem after the sack by Nebuchadnezzar in 587 BC and discusses how Judaism can survive when the temple is no longer in existence. It frames this discussion as a mystical vision granted to Baruch ben Neriah. Also like 2 Baruch, 3 Baruch argues that the Temple has been preserved in heaven and is presented as fully functional and attended by angels; thus there is no need for the temple to be rebuilt on earth. This third book of Baruch addresses the question of why God permits good people to suffer, and answering with a vision of the afterlife in which sinners and the righteous get their just rewards.

During the vision, Baruch is shown various heavens, there witnessing the punishment of the builders of the "tower of strife against God" (perhaps the Tower of Babel); a serpent named Hades who drinks from the sea; and other such marvels, until he is finally stopped by a locked gate at the fifth heaven, which only the archangel Michael has the ability to open.

The builders of the "tower of strife" are described in terms that could be regarded as demonic – with the faces of cattle, horns of deer, and feet of goats; while those who commanded them to build it are punished eternally in a separate heaven where they are reincarnated in the forms of dogs, bears or apes. Baruch also witnesses a phoenix, which the text portrays as a massive singular bird that protects the earth from the rays of the sun.

== Origins ==
Lee asserts that the text was originally written in Greek by someone with a Semitic background. Other scholars find significant that the Old Church Slavonic versions do not contain the Christian overtones of the Greek text and conclude that the extant Greek text represents a rewriting in the Christian age.

== See also ==
- Baruch
- Book of Baruch
- 2 Baruch
- 4 Baruch

== General and cited references ==
- Lee, Pilchan (2001). The New Jerusalem in the Book of Revelation: A Study of Revelation 21–22 in the Light of Its Background in Jewish Tradition. Mohr Siebeck. ISBN 978-3-16-147477-4.
