= Ladder of Jacob =

2nd-century Merkabah text

The Ladder of Jacob (Hebrew: Sulam Yaakov סולם יעקב) is a pseudepigraphic writing of the Old Testament. It is usually considered to be part of the apocalyptic literature. The text has been preserved only in Slavonic, and it is clearly a translation from a now lost Greek version. It is not regarded as scripture by Jews or any Christian group.

== Manuscript tradition ==
The text of the Ladder of Jacob has been preserved only in Old Church Slavonic; it is found in the Tolkovaja Paleja, a compendium of various Old Testament texts and comments which also preserved the Apocalypse of Abraham. The Tolkovaja Paleja is a compilation of texts assembled in the 8th or 9th century in Greek and later translated into Slavonic; it is the only translation that has survived. Some plays on words in the Ladder of Jacob suggest an original Hebrew text, or a Greek text intended for readers with at least some knowledge of Hebrew.

Two recensions of the Ladder of Jacob have been identified: a longer one, usually denoted A, which survives in three manuscripts, and a shorter one, usually called B, which is represented by the majority of the manuscript tradition (of thirteen manuscripts). The chief difference between these is that the shorter recension reduces drastically the prayer of Jacob and omits the name of the angel Sariel (2:2-5:1).

== Date and origin ==
The date and origin of the Ladder of Jacob are uncertain. It is possible to infer at least three stages: an original work written in a Jewish context after the Destruction of the Temple, the use in early Byzantine world and the final translation in Slavonic around the ninth century. In the Christian stages the text was interpolated to form an anti-Jewish polemic, by adding some comments here and there, omitting some sentences and adding a Christian conclusion: Chapter Seven has Christian origin. The expectation of a delayed warrior Messiah and the similarities with 2 Baruch, Apocalypse of Abraham and other apocalyptic literature suggest the original text may have been written in the first half of the second century CE.

== Content ==
The Ladder of Jacob is based on the Biblical dream of Jacob in Genesis 28:11–19.

- Chapter 1 is an expansion of the narrative of Genesis. Jacob falls asleep and sees a ladder set up on the Earth; the top of it reaches to heaven with angels ascending and descending on it. Many details are added to the Genesis narrative: the ladder is made of twelve steps, and on each step there are two human forms, one on each side of the step, visible as far as their breasts. On the top of the ladder there was a "face", "as of a man", carved in the fire and much more terrifying than the twenty-four other busts. The Lord is over this central "face".
- Chapter 2 includes a prayer by Jacob, surely abbreviated by the Slavonic copyist, asking the Lord the meaning of the vision. The prayer describes God sitting on a fire throne, surrounded by Cherubim and Seraphim, a vision that is a classic example of Merkabah.
- In Chapter 3 the angel Sariel is sent by the Lord to Jacob to explain the vision, and the text says Jacob was not terrified by the vision of the angel.
- In Chapter 4 Sariel changes the name of Jacob to Israel in order to have it "to be similar to his own name".
- Chapter 5 includes the explanation of the ladder given by Sariel: the ladder is the Age, and the twelve steps are the periods into which the Age is divided (the same division we find in 2 Baruch). The twenty-four human busts are the kings of the world who oppose Israel, some more, some less. The fourth step may be the author's picture of his own time; in the last times the Lord will raise a descendant of Esau (probably the Roman Empire) who initially will protect Israel, and later will serve the idols and use violence. The people of Jacob will be exiled, made slaves and wounded.
- Chapter 6 is about the coming of the Messiah, described as a king who fights against the enemies of Israel and wins; the enemies then repent and the Lord accepts their plea. In the following events the Lord acts directly: there will be earthquakes and destructions followed by the final victory against the Leviathan and the Falkon. The sons of Jacob will walk in the Lord's justice, and the kingdoms of Edom and Moab will be destroyed.
- Chapter 7 is surely a Christian addition; it predicts the Incarnation of the Savior.

== Theology ==
The Ladder of Jacob, as well as the Apocalypse of Abraham, interprets the experience of Patriarchs in the context of merkabah mysticism. The Ladder of Jacob takes a stand on the main issues debated in apocalyptic literature: the role of the Messiah is limited to that of a warrior, the final victory against the evil and the last judgment are carried out directly by God himself, and it is possible to repent on the last day.

== See also ==
- Jacob's Ladder

== Sources ==
- H.F.D. Sparks The Apocryphal Old Testament ISBN 0-19-826177-2 (1984) pag 453-464
- H.G.Lunt Ladder of Jacob, a new translation and introduction in ed. James H. Charlesworth The Old Testament Pseudepigrapha, Vol. 2 ISBN 0385188137(1985) pag 401-412.
- P.Sacchi M.Enrietti Apocrifi dell'Antico Testamento Vol 3 ISBN 88-394-0583-6 (1999) pag 551-570.
