= 4 Baruch =

Text of the biblical Old Testament

Folio 36r of the Theodore Psalter depicts scenes derived from 4 Baruch.

Fourth Baruch is a pseudepigraphical text of the Old Testament. Paralipomena of Jeremiah appears as the title in several Ancient Greek manuscripts of the work, meaning "things left out of (the Book of) Jeremiah." It is part of the Ethiopian Orthodox Bible.

== Origin and transmission ==
4 Baruch is usually dated to the first half of the 2nd century AD. Abimelech's sleep of 66 years, instead of the usual 70 years of Babylonian captivity, makes scholars tend toward the year AD 136, that is, 66 years after the fall of the Second Temple in AD 70. This dating is coherent with the message of the text.

The text is known in both full-length and reduced versions. The full-length versions came down to us in Greek (older manuscripts dated 10th–11th centuries and 15th century), in Ethiopic Ge'ez (titled Rest of the Words of Baruch, the older manuscript dated to the 15th century), in Armenian, and in Slavic. The shortened versions have come down to us in Greek (named Meneo), Romanian and Slavic.

Some parts of 4 Baruch appear to have been added in the Christian era, such as the last chapter; due to these insertions, some scholars consider 4 Baruch to have Christian origins.

== Synopsis ==
4 Baruch uses a simple and fable-like style, with speech-making animals, fruit that never rots, and an eagle sent by the Lord that revives the dead.

The Lord reveals to Jeremiah that Jerusalem will be destroyed because of the impiety of the Israelites. Jeremiah informs Baruch, and that night they see angels open the door to the city. Jeremiah is instructed by the Lord to miraculously hide in the earth the vestments of the high priest of the Temple. The Chaldeans enter Jerusalem, and Jeremiah follows the Israelites into exile, while Baruch remains in Jerusalem. Abimelech (= Ebedmelech the Ethiopian of Jeremiah 38:7) falls asleep for 66 years and awakens next to a basket of figs, preserved perfectly fresh. Because the figs are fresh out of season, Abimelech realizes that he slept for years miraculously. Abimelech reunites with Baruch. They want to communicate with Jeremiah, who is still in Babylon, so Baruch prays to the Lord, who sends him an eagle. The eagle takes a letter and some of the figs to Jeremiah. It finds Jeremiah officiating at a funeral and alights on the corpse, bringing it back to life, thus announcing the end of the exile. The Israelites return to Jerusalem, but only those men who have no foreign wives are allowed to pass the Jordan.

Like the greater prophets, 4 Baruch advocates the divorce of foreign wives and exile of those who will not do so. According to 4 Baruch, the Samaritans are the descendants of such mixed marriages.

== Reception and influence ==
Fourth Baruch is regarded as pseudepigraphical by all Christian churches, except the Ethiopian Orthodox Church (see Rest of the Words of Baruch).

The Jewish pseudepigraphical text History of the Captivity in Babylon belongs to the cycle of Baruch and is related to 4 Baruch. It is longer and probably older than 4 Baruch. It has very few and circumscribed Christian insertions and does not have the fable-like style of 4 Baruch. Abimelech's sleep is here of 70 years, the usual duration of the Babylonian captivity. The original Greek is lost, but we have Sahidic Coptic manuscripts and, even if less ancient, Arabic Garshuni manuscripts

== See also ==
- Book of Baruch
- Book of Jeremiah
- 2 Baruch
- 3 Baruch
- Rest of the Words of Baruch
