= Letter of Jeremiah =

Deuterocanonical book of the Old Testament of the Bible

The Letter of Jeremiah, also known as the Epistle of Jeremiah, is a deuterocanonical book of the Old Testament; this letter is attributed to Jeremiah and addressed to the Jews who were about to be carried away as captives to Babylon by Nebuchadnezzar. It is included in Catholic bibles as the final chapter of the Book of Baruch (Baruch 6). It is included in Orthodox and Assyrian Church of the East bibles as a separate book, and is in the Apocrypha of the King James Version.

== Author ==
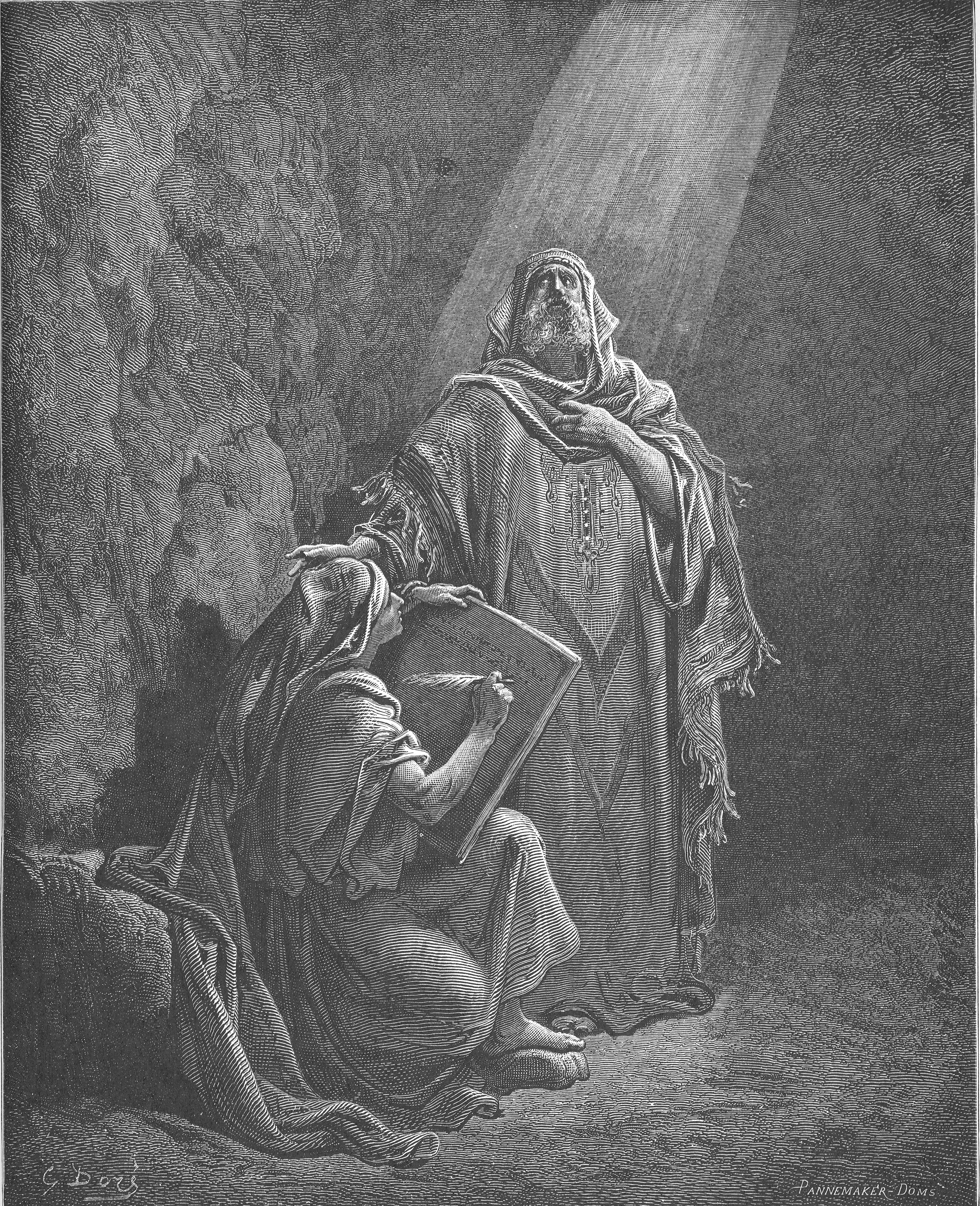
Baruch Writes Jeremiah's Prophecies (Gustave Doré)

According to the text of the letter, the author is the biblical prophet Jeremiah. The biblical Book of Jeremiah itself contains the words of a letter sent by Jeremiah "from Jerusalem" to the "captives" in Babylon (Jeremiah 29:1–23). The Letter of Jeremiah portrays itself as a similar piece of correspondence.

Letter of Jeremiah 1 (KJV)	Jeremiah 29:1 (KJV)
A copy of an epistle, which Jeremy sent unto them which were to be led captives into Babylon by the king of the Babylonians, to certify them, as it was commanded by God.	Now these are the words of the letter that Jeremiah the prophet sent from Jerusalem unto the residue of the elders which were carried away captives ... and to all the people whom Nebuchadnezzar had carried away captive from Jerusalem to Babylon.

As E. H. Gifford puts it, "The fact that Jeremiah had written one such letter to the captives seems to have suggested the idea of dignifying by his name another letter not written in reality till many ages after his death." Against the traditional view, most contemporary scholars agree that the author was not Jeremiah: one exception is the Catholic commentator F. H. Reusch.

The chief arguments put forward are literary quality, as well as the religious depth and sensitivity. J. T. Marshall adds that the use of "seven generations" (v. 3) rather than "seventy years" (Jer 29:10) for the duration of the exile "points away from Jeremiah towards one who deplored the long exile". The author may have been a Hellenistic Jew who lived in Alexandria, but it is difficult to say with certainty. The earliest manuscripts containing the Epistle of Jeremiah are all in Greek. The earliest Greek fragment (1st century BC) was discovered in Qumran.

Gifford reports that in his time "the great majority of competent and impartial critics" considered Greek to be the original language. As one of these critics O. F. Fritzsche put it, "If any one of the Apocryphal books was composed in Greek, this certainly was." The strongest dissenter from this majority view was C. J. Ball, who marshalled the most compelling argument for a Hebrew original. However, Yale Semitic scholar C. C. Torrey was not persuaded: "If the examination by a scholar of Ball's thoroughness and wide learning can produce nothing better than this, it can be said with little hesitation that the language was probably not Hebrew." Torrey's own conclusion was that the work was originally composed in Aramaic. In recent years the tide of opinion has shifted and now the consensus is that the "letter" was originally composed in Hebrew (or Aramaic).

== Date ==
The date of this work is uncertain. Most scholars agree that it is dependent on certain biblical passages, notably Isa 44:9–20, 46:5–7, and thus can be no earlier than 540 BC. Since a fragment (7Q2) was identified among the scrolls in Qumran Cave 7, it can be no later than 100 BC. Further support for this terminus ad quem may be found in a possible reference to the letter in 2 Maccabees 2:1–3.

Letter of Jeremiah vv. 4–6 (NEB)	2 Maccabees 2:1–3 (c. 150–120 BC)
Now in Babylon you will see carried on men's shoulder's gods made of silver, gold, and wood, which fill the heathen with awe. Be careful, then, never to imitate these Gentiles; do not be overawed by their gods when you see them in the midst of a procession of worshippers. But say in your hearts, "To thee alone, Lord, is worship due."	The records show that it was the prophet Jeremiah who ordered the exiles ... not to neglect the ordinances of the Lord, or be led astray by the sight of images of gold and silver with all their finery.

As mentioned above, the use of "seven generations" rather than "seventy years" points to a later period. Ball calculates the date to be c. 317–307 BC. Tededche notes: "It is well known that many Jews were attracted to alien cults throughout the Greek period, 300 BC onward, so that the warning in the letter might have been uttered any time during this period."

== Canonicity ==
The epistle is one of four deuterocanonical books found among the Dead Sea Scrolls (see Tanakh at Qumran). (The other three are Psalm 151, Sirach, and Tobit.) The portion of the epistle discovered at Qumran was written in Greek. This does not preclude the possibility of the text being based on a prior Hebrew or Aramaic text. However, the only text available to us has dozens of linguistic features available in Greek, but not in Hebrew; this shows that the Greek text is more than a minimalist translation.

The earliest evidence of its canonicity arising in Christian tradition is in the work of Origen of Alexandria, as reported by Eusebius in his Church History. Origen listed Lamentations and the Letter of Jeremiah as one unit with the Book of Jeremiah proper, among "the canonical books as the Hebrews have handed them down", though many scholars agree that this was a slip.

Epiphanius of Salamis in his Panarion writes that Jews had in their books the deuterocanonical Epistle of Jeremiah and Baruch, both combined with Jeremiah and Lamentations in only one book.

Athanasius of Alexandria mentions the same: he includes the deuterocanonical Epistle of Jeremiah and Baruch as a part of the Old Testament Canon, both combined with Jeremiah and Lamentations in only one book.

Cyril of Jerusalem writes in his list of canonical books "of Jeremiah one, including Baruch and Lamentations and the Epistle".

Tertullian quotes the letter authoritatively in the eighth chapter of Scorpiace.

The Synod of Laodicea (4th century) wrote that Jeremiah, and Baruch, the Lamentations, and the Epistle are canonical in only one book.

Jerome provided the majority of the translation work for the vulgar (popular) Latin translation of the Bible, called the Vulgate Bible. Since no Hebrew text was available, Jerome refused to consider the Epistle of Jeremiah, as the other books he called apocryphal, canonical.

Despite Jerome's reservations, the epistle was included as chapter 6 of the Book of Baruch in the Old Testament of the Vulgate. The King James Version follows the same practice, while placing Baruch in the Apocrypha section as does Luther's Bible. In the Ethiopian Orthodox canon, it forms part of the "Rest of Jeremiah", along with 4 Baruch (also known as the Paleipomena of Jeremiah).

Today, the book is included in Catholic, Eastern Orthodox, Oriental Orthodox, and Assyrian Church of the East bibles.

== Contents ==
The letter is actually a harangue against idols and idolatry. Bruce M. Metzger suggests "one might perhaps characterize it as an impassioned sermon which is based on a verse from the canonical Book of Jeremiah." That verse is Jer 10:11, the only verse in the entire book written in Aramaic.

Tell them this: "These gods, who did not make the heavens and the earth, will perish from the earth and from under the heavens."

— Jeremiah 10:11 (NIV)

The work was written with a serious practical purpose: to instruct the Jews not to worship the gods of the Babylonians, but to worship only the Lord. As Gifford puts it, "the writer is evidently making an earnest appeal to persons actually living in the midst of heathenism, and needing to be warned and encouraged against temptations to apostasy." The author warned the Hebrew exiles that they were to remain in captivity for seven generations, and that during that time they would see the worship paid to idols. Readers were exhorted not to participate, because the idols were created by men, without the powers of speech, hearing, or self-preservation. Then follows a satirical denunciation of the idols. As Gifford explains, in this folly of idolatry "there is no clear logical arrangement of the thought, but the divisions are marked by the recurrence of a refrain, which is apparently intended to give a sort of rhythmical air to the whole composition." The conclusion reiterates the warning to avoid idolatry.

== Notes ==
Deuterocanon
Preceded by Lamentations	R. Catholic; Books of the Bible; Baruch includes the Letter of Jeremiah	Succeeded by Ezekiel
Preceded by Baruch	Eastern Orthodox; Books of the Bible	Succeeded by Ezekiel
