= Book of Baruch =

Deuterocanonical book of the Bible in some Christian traditions

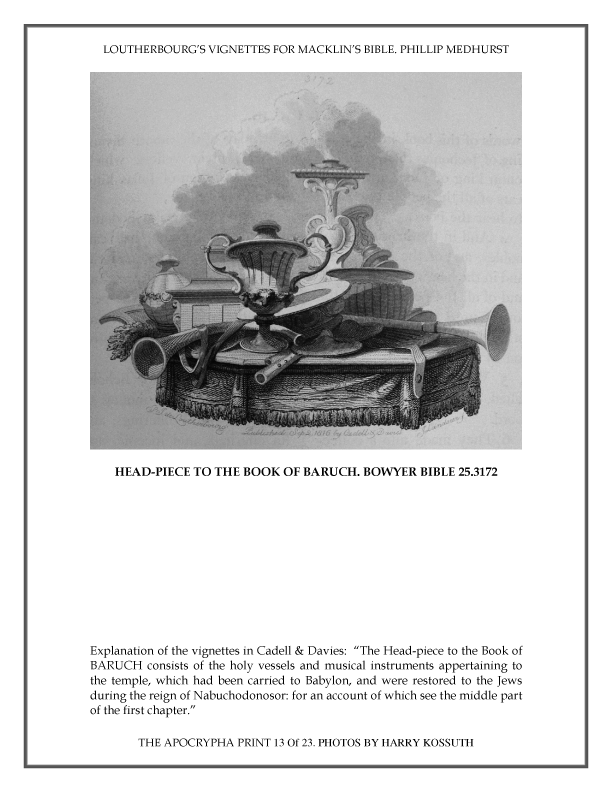
Headpiece to the Book of Baruch by Philip James de Loutherbourg, 1816, depicting holy vessels and musical instruments (Baruch 1:8–9)

The Book of Baruch (Ancient Greek: Βαροὺχ, Biblical Hebrew: בָּרוּךְ 'blessed') is a deuterocanonical book of the Bible, used in many Christian traditions, such as Catholic and Orthodox churches. In Judaism and Protestant Christianity, it is considered not to be part of the canon, with the Protestant Bibles categorizing it as part of the Biblical apocrypha. The book is named after Baruch ben Neriah, the prophet Jeremiah's scribe who is mentioned at Baruch 1:1, and has been presumed to be the author of the whole work. The book is a reflection of a late Jewish writer on the circumstances of Jewish exiles from Babylon, with meditations on the theology and history of Israel, discussions of wisdom, and a direct address to residents of Jerusalem and the Diaspora. Some scholars propose that it was written during or shortly after the period of the Maccabees.

The Book of Baruch is sometimes referred to as 1 Baruch to distinguish it from 2 Baruch, 3 Baruch and 4 Baruch.

Although the earliest known manuscripts of Baruch are in Greek, linguistic features of the first parts of Baruch (1:1–3:8) have been proposed as indicating a translation from a Semitic language.

Although not in the Hebrew Bible, it is found in the Septuagint, and also in Theodotion's Greek version. It is considered to be a canonical book of the Old Testament by the Catholic Church, the Eastern Orthodox Church and the Oriental Orthodox Churches. In 80-book Protestant Bibles, the Book of Baruch is a part of the Biblical apocrypha. Jerome, despite his misgivings about the deuterocanonical books, included Baruch into his Vulgate translation. In the Vulgate it is grouped with the books of the prophets alongside Jeremiah and Lamentations. In the Vulgate, the King James Bible Apocrypha, and many other versions, the Letter of Jeremiah is appended to the Book of Baruch as a sixth chapter; in the Septuagint and Orthodox Bibles chapter 6 is usually counted as a separate book, called the Letter or Epistle of Jeremiah.

== Authorship and date ==
Baruch 1:1–14 gives a narrative account of an occasion when Baruch ben Neriah reads the book of "these words" before the Israelites in Babylon, and then sends that book (together with collected funds) to be read in Jerusalem. Where the Book of Baruch is considered to be a distinct work of scripture, it is commonly identified as the book that Baruch reads; and hence Baruch himself has traditionally been credited as the author of the whole work. However, the syntactical form of Baruch 1 has been held rather to imply that "these words" correspond to a preceding text—which might then be identified with Lamentations or with the Book of Jeremiah; in which case, comparison may be made with a corresponding episode in Jeremiah 36, wherein Baruch records and reads from the prophecies of Jeremiah, at the latter's instruction. These considerations underlie an alternative tradition (found, for instance, in Augustine) in which all four works (Book of Jeremiah, Baruch, Lamentations, Letter of Jeremiah) are credited to Jeremiah himself as author.

Critical scholarship is, however, united in rejecting either Baruch or Jeremiah as author of the Book of Baruch, or in dating the work in the period of its purported context (the Babylonian Exile). Rather, they have seen clear thematic and linguistic parallels with later works: namely, with the Book of Daniel and the Book of Sirach. Many scholars have noted that the restoration of worship in the Jerusalem Temple following its pollution by Antiochus Epiphanes could provide a counterpart historical context in which the narrative of Baruch may equally be considered to apply; and, consequently, a date in the period 200–100 BC has been proposed.

== Basic structure ==
The basic outline of the book of Baruch:

- 1:1–14 Introduction: "And these are the words ... which Baruch ... wrote in Babylonia. ... And when they heard it they wept, and fasted, and prayed before the Lord."
- 1:15–2:10 Confession of sins: "[T]he Lord hath watched over us for evil, and hath brought it upon us: for the Lord is just in all his works. ... And we have not hearkened to his voice"....
- 2:11–3:8 Prayer for mercy: "[F]or the dead that are in hell, whose spirit is taken away from their bowels, shall not give glory and justice to the Lord ..." (cf. Psalms 6:6/5)
- 3:9–4:14 A paean for Wisdom: "Where are the princes of the nations ... that hoard up silver and gold, wherein men trust? ... They are cut off, and are gone down to hell ..."
- 4:5–5:9 Baruch's Poem of Consolation: messages for those in captivity, for the "neighbours of Zion", and for Jerusalem: "You have been sold to the Gentiles, not for your destruction: but because you provoked God to wrath. ... [F]or the sins of my children, he [the Eternal] hath brought a nation upon them from afar ... who have neither reverenced the ancient, nor pitied children. ... Let no one gloat over me [Jerusalem], a widow, bereft of many, for the sins of my children I am left desolate, for they turned from the law of God". "Look toward the east, O Jerusalem, and see the joy that is coming to you from God".
- Chapter 6: see Letter of Jeremiah

== Early evidence of use ==
No reference to the Book of Baruch is found in Rabbinic literature, nor is its text cited. A fragment of the Letter of Jeremiah in Greek has been excavated amongst the Dead Sea Scrolls, but no counterpart fragments survive of the Book of Baruch. It is generally argued that there are no references to, quotations from, or allusions to the Book of Baruch in the New Testament, although Adams proposes a general similarity between themes in the later parts of the book and some in the Pauline Epistles, particularly Galatians and 1 Corinthians. The earliest evidence for the text of the Book of Baruch is in quotations in the works of early Christian Church Fathers; the earliest citation being in the Legatio pro Christianis: 9 of Athenagoras of Athens, dated 177. Much the most extensive use of the Book of Baruch in patristic literature is in the Adversus Haereses: 5.35.1 (c. 180) of Irenaeus of Lyons, which draws extensively on Baruch 4:36 to 5:9. Both Athenagorus and Irenaeus cite these readings as being from the Book of Jeremiah. A brief quotation appears also in the Paedagogus by Clement of Alexandria. Increasingly from the 4th century onwards, however, Greek Fathers tend to cite such readings as from a 'Book of Baruch', although Latin Fathers consistently maintain the former practice of citing these texts as from Jeremiah, and where they do refer to a 'Book of Baruch' are to be understood as denoting the apocalyptic work, 2 Baruch.

== Manuscripts ==
Both the Book of Baruch and the Letter of Jeremiah are separate books in the great pandect Greek Bibles, Codex Vaticanus (4th century) and Codex Alexandrinus (5th century), where they are found in the order Jeremiah, Baruch, Lamentations, Letter of Jeremiah. In the Codex Sinaiticus (4th century) Lamentations follows directly after Jeremiah and Baruch is not found; but a lacuna after Lamentations prevents a definitive assessment of whether Baruch may have been included elsewhere in this manuscript. Neither of the two surviving early Latin pandect Bibles (Codex Amiatinus (7th century) and Leon palimpsest (7th century) includes either the Book of Baruch or the Letter of Jeremiah; the earliest Latin witnesses to the text being the Codex Cavensis (9th century) and the Theodulfian Bibles (9th century). Baruch is also witnessed in some early Coptic (Bohairic and Sahidic) and Syriac manuscripts, but is not found in Coptic or Syriac lectionaries.

== Language ==
The Latin, Syriac, Coptic, Armenian, Arabic, Bohairic and Ethiopic versions of Baruch are all translated directly from the Greek; the text of which survives in Vaticanus and Alexandrinus, and is highly consistent. Jerome (5th century) states that no Hebrew text was in existence, and Origen (3rd century) appears to know of no Hebrew text in the preparation of the text of Baruch in the Hexapla Old Testament. Nevertheless, there are a number of readings in the earlier sections of Baruch (1:1 to 3:8) where an anomalous reading in the Greek appears to imply a mistranslation of a Hebrew or Aramaic source; as at chapter 3:4, where 'hear now the prayers of the dead of Israel' (מֵתֵי יִשְׂרָאֵל) is assumed to be a mistranslation of, 'hear now the prayers of the men of Israel' (מְתֵי יִשְׂרָאֵל, from the plural word מְתִים 'men' as in biblical expressions like מְתֵי אָהֳלִי 'men of my tent', מְתֵי שָׁוְא 'men of vanity' or מְתֵי מִסְפָּר 'men of few [numbers]'). Since the 19th century, critical scholars have assumed a Semitic original for these earlier parts of the book, and a number of studies, such as that of Tov, have sought to retrovert from the Greek to a plausible Hebrew source text. Whereas in the Revised Standard Version (1957) of Bible, the English text of Baruch consistently follows the Greek in these readings; in the New Revised Standard Version (1989) these readings are adjusted to conform with a conjectural reconstruction of a supposed Hebrew original.

Nevertheless, some more recent studies of Baruch, such as those by Adams and Bogaert, take the Greek text to be the original. Adams maintains that most of the text of Baruch depends on that of other books of the Bible; and indeed it has been characterised by Tov as a "mosaic of Biblical passages" especially in these early sections. Consequently, variations from the literal Hebrew text could have found their way directly into a dependent Greek version, without having to presume a Semitic intermediary stage. Moreover, Adams takes issue with the presupposition behind conjectural retroversions to conform to a supposed Hebrew text; that the author of Baruch understood the principle of literal translation, and aspired to follow that principle; and yet lamentably failed to do so.

== Canonicity ==
In the Greek East, Cyril of Jerusalem (c. AD 350), Athanasius (367), and Epiphanius of Salamis (c. 385) listed the Book of Baruch as canonical. Athanasius credits "Jeremiah with Baruch, Lamentations, and the Epistle" with canonicity; the other Fathers offer similar formulations.

Baruch is mentioned by the Synod of Laodicea (c. AD 364); appended to Canon 59 is a list of canonical books, in which Jeremiah, and Baruch, the Lamentations, and the Epistle are stated as canonical. This list is found in compendiums of the decrees of Laodicea circulating in the Ethiopic church, and in all later Greek compendiums; but is absent from counterpart compendiums of Laodicea circulating in the Latin, Coptic and Syriac churches, as too from some earlier Greek compendiums. In the decrees of the Council of Florence (1442) and the Council of Trent (1546), "Jeremias with Baruch" is stated as canonical.

The Council of Rome (AD 382), the Synod of Hippo (393), and Pope Innocent I (405), followed by the Council of Carthage (397) and the Council of Carthage (419), all mention Jeremiah as a canonical book without mentioning Baruch; however, it is commonly accepted that the absence of specific mention of Baruch, in canon-lists then circulating in the West, cannot be interpreted as intended to assert that the Book of Baruch was non-canonical—only that it was being subsumed within Jeremiah. Most of the Church Fathers considered Jeremiah, along with Baruch, Lamentations, and the Epistle, to be a single book.

Augustine of Hippo (c. AD 397), in his The City of God 18:33, discusses the text of Baruch 3: 36–38, noting that this is variously cited to Baruch and to Jeremiah; his preference was for the latter attribution. Jerome did not consider the Book of Baruch to be a canonical book, but he included it in his Vulgate.

There was also an extensive body of pseudepigraphal Baruch apocalyptic literature (2 Baruch, 3 Baruch, 4 Baruch), which are frequently classed in Latin lists as apocryphal.

Baruch is included in Catholic, Eastern Orthodox, Oriental Orthodox, and Assyrian Church of the East bibles.

== Book of Baruch and Book of Jeremiah ==
The evident variation among early Christian divines as to whether a particular reading is to be cited from "Baruch" or "Jeremiah" is generally regarded as relating to the very different texts of the Book of Jeremiah that are found respectively in manuscripts of the Greek and Hebrew Bibles. The version of Jeremiah in the Greek Septuagint texts (Vaticanus, Alexandrinus) is a seventh shorter than that in the Hebrew Masoretic Text or the Latin Vulgate; and the ordering of the chapters is very different, with sections from the middle of the book in the Septuagint version (the Oracles against the Nations) found at the end of the book in the Masoretic text and Vulgate. As Hebrew fragments have been found in the Dead Sea Scrolls corresponding to both the Septuagint and Masoretic orders, it is commonly accepted that the two versions derive from two distinct Hebrew traditions, and that the Septuagint form of the text is likely the older.

Benedictine scholar Pierre-Maurice Bogaert suggests that, if the Book of Baruch is appended to the Septuagint version of Jeremiah, it follows on as a plausible continuation of the Septuagint narrative (Chapter 51: 31–35 in the Septuagint, corresponding to the truncated Chapter 45 in the Masoretic text). A similar conclusion is proposed by Emanuel Tov, who notes characteristics of a consistent redactional revision of the Septuagint text of Jeremiah from Chapter 29 onwards (correcting readings towards the Hebrew), a revision that is then carried over into the Greek text of Baruch 1:1 to 3:8, suggesting that these once formed a continuous text. Bogaert consequently proposes that the gathering of sections from the end of Septuagint Jeremiah into a distinct "Book of Baruch" was an innovation of Christian biblical practice in the Greek church from around the 3rd century onwards; but that the version of Jeremiah in the Old Latin Bible preceded this practice, and hence did not designate the Book of Baruch as a distinct work of scripture, but included its text within the Book of Jeremiah. The text of Old Latin Jeremiah nowhere survives in sufficient form for this speculation to be confirmed, but Bogaert proposes that its characteristics may be recognized in the texts of Baruch in the early Theodulfian Vulgate Bibles—noting that Baruch in these manuscripts is continuous with Jeremiah, and that the end at Chapter 5:9 is marked by an explicit, in Old Latin form, stating "Explicit Hieremiae Prophetae" ("Here ends [the book] of Jeremiah the Prophet").

== Liturgical use ==
=== Western ===
==== Catholic usage ====
In the Catholic Church, Baruch 3:9–38 is used in the liturgy of Holy Saturday during Passiontide in the traditional lectionary of scripture readings at Mass. A similar selection occurs during the revised liturgy for the Easter Vigil.

Baruch 1:14 – 2:5; 3:1–8 is a liturgical reading within the revised Roman Catholic Breviary for the 29th Week in Ordinary Time, Friday Office of Readings. The subject is the prayer and confession of sin of a penitent people:

Justice is with the Lord, our God; and we today are flushed with shame, we men of Judah and citizens of Jerusalem, that we, with our kings and rulers and priests and prophets, and with our fathers, have sinned in the Lord's sight and disobeyed him. ... And the Lord fulfilled the warning he had uttered against us.... Lord Almighty, ... Hear... and have mercy on us, who have sinned against you... (Baruch 1:15–18; 2:1; 3:1–2)

Augustine of Hippo's reflection, which is paired with this reading, on this occasion speaks of prayer: "[S]ince this [that we pray for] is that peace that surpasses all understanding, even when we ask for it in prayer we do not know how to pray for what is right..."; from there he explains what it means that the Holy Spirit pleads for the saints.

Baruch 3:9–15, 24–4:4 is a liturgical reading for the Saturday of the same week. The theme is that the salvation of Israel is founded on wisdom: "Learn where prudence is, ... that you may know also where are length of days, and life, where light of the eyes, and peace. Who has found the place of wisdom, who has entered into her treasuries? ... She is the book of the precepts of God, ... All who cling to her will live... Turn, O Jacob, and receive her: ... Give not your glory to another, your privileges to an alien race." Paired with this on the same day is a reading from Peter Chrysologus, died AD 450, who quotes Paul the Apostle: "let us also wear the likeness of the man of heaven".

Baruch 5:1-9 is read on the second Sunday of Advent in Year C of the three-yearly lectionary cycle.

==== Lutheran usage ====
The Book of Baruch is part of the intertestamental Apocrypha section of the Bible in the Lutheran churches. Scripture readings from the Apocrypha are included as options in the lectionaries of the Lutheran churches.

==== Anglican usage ====
Baruch is listed in Article VI of the Thirty-Nine Articles of the Church of England. In the Daily Office Lectionary for Christmas Eve, Baruch 4:21–29 is read; on Christmas day, Baruch 4:30–5:9; both of these are considered Messianic Prophecies in the Anglican tradition.

In the American 1928 Book of Common Prayer, the Daily Office lectionary includes the Book of Baruch for the First Lesson on several occasions: Baruch 4:21–30 on the Second Sunday after Easter; Baruch 3:14–15, 29–37 for the 21st Sunday after Trinity; and Baruch 5 for the 22nd Sunday after Trinity. In the American Book of Common Prayer (1979) Baruch 5:1–9 is the Old Testament reading for Advent II (Year C); and in the Daily Office (Year 2) Baruch 4:21–29 is prescribed for Advent IV, and Baruch 4:36–5:9 for Dec. 24.

=== Eastern ===
In the Eastern Orthodox Church and those Eastern Catholic Churches which follow the Byzantine Rite, a selection from Baruch (which is considered an extension of the Book of Jeremiah, and is announced in the services as "Jeremiah") is read as one of the eight Paroemia (Old Testament readings) during the Vesperal Divine Liturgy on Christmas Eve.

== Use by theologians, Church Fathers, the Second Vatican Council ==
In Summa Theologiae III 4 4, Doctor of the Church Thomas Aquinas quotes Baruch 3:37 (3:38 in Vulgate) to affirm that "the Son of God assumed human nature in order to show Himself in men's sight, according to Baruch 3:38: Afterwards He was seen upon earth, and conversed with men." This statement is part of his discussion of "the mode of union on the part of the human nature" III 4. He quotes the same passage of Baruch in III 40 1 to help answer "whether Christ should have associated with men, or led a solitary life" III 40. This reading—which is now considered to, properly translated, discuss rather Divine Wisdom's appearance upon the earth—was widely interpreted in Christian discourse as a prophecy of the incarnation of Jesus Christ.

Church Father Clement of Alexandria, d. AD 217, quoted Baruch 3:16–19, referring to the passage thus: "Divine Scripture, addressing itself to those who love themselves and to the boastful, somewhere says most excellently: 'Where are the princes of the nations...'" (see "Paean for Wisdom" example infra) (Jurgens §410a).

Hilary of Poitiers, d. AD 368, also a Church Father, quoted the same passage as Thomas, supra, (3:36–38), citing "Jeremias", about which Jurgens states: "Baruch was secretary to Jeremias, and is cited by the Fathers mostly under the name of Jeremias" (§864n). Hilary states: "Besides Moses and Isaias, listen now a third time, and to Jeremias, who teaches the same thing, when He says:..." (Jurgens §864).

Baruch 3:38(37) is referenced in the Dogmatic Constitution on Divine Revelation of the Second Vatican Council.

== Use in the current Catechism of the Catholic Church ==
The Letter of Jeremiah (Baruch 6) is quoted in the Catechism of the Catholic Church as part of an exposition against idolatry. During the Diaspora the Jews lamented their lapse into idolatry, and their repentance is captured in the Book of Baruch.

== In popular culture ==
The Book of Baruch by the Gnostic Justin is a sequence of 270 poems by the English poet Geoffrey Hill, published posthumously by Oxford University Press in 2019.

== See also ==
- Books of the Bible
- Major prophets
- 2 Baruch
- 3 Baruch
- 4 Baruch
- Ubi sunt

Deuterocanon
Preceded by Lamentations	R. Catholic; Books of the Bible; Baruch includes the Letter of Jeremiah	Succeeded by Ezekiel
Preceded by Lamentations	Eastern Orthodox; Books of the Bible	Succeeded by Letter of Jeremiah
