= Coptic literature =

Body of writings in the Coptic language of Egypt

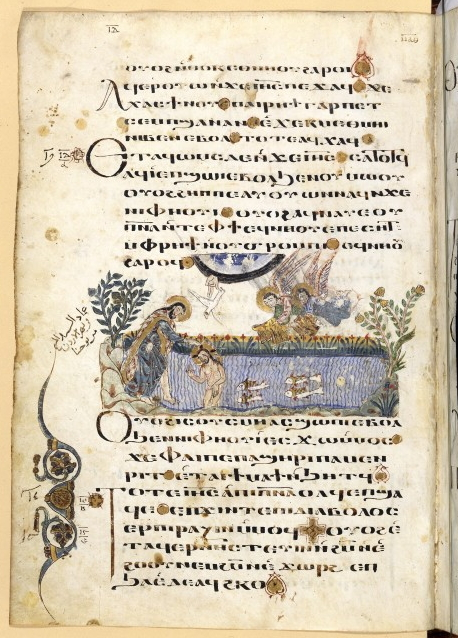
Miniature depicting the baptism of Christ from a late 12th-century illuminated copy of the Gospels

Coptic literature is the body of writings in the Coptic language of Egypt, the last stage of the indigenous Egyptian language. It is written in the Coptic alphabet. The study of the Coptic language and literature is called Coptology.

== Definition ==
Since the term "Coptic" can have, besides a linguistic sense, an ethnic sense (referring to Copts) and a religious sense (Coptic Christianity), there is the propensity for ambiguity in the term "Coptic literature". Coptic literature is usually defined as that in the Coptic language. It is not usually limited to original compositions, but includes also translations into Coptic (mainly from Greek). It also includes texts believed to have been composed in Coptic, but which are preserved only in translation (mainly in Arabic and Ethiopic).

In a broader sense, "Coptic" may include Greek literature produced in Egypt that circulated in the Coptic community. The literature that the Copts wrote in Arabic is generally treated separately as Copto-Arabic literature. "Literature", too, may be taken in a strict sense that excludes documentary and subliterary texts, such as magical and medical texts.

== Dialects ==
The standard literary dialect of Coptic was Sahidic and the majority of surviving texts are in that dialect. There are up to six other recognized dialects of Coptic—Bohairic, Fayyumic, Lycopolitan, Akhmimic, Subakhmimic and Oxyrhynchite—and further idiolects. The identification of a text's dialect can narrow down its place of origin. All of the dialects are represented in the literature to some degree, especially Bohairic in the late period.

== Manuscripts ==
Coptic was written on parchment, papyrus and ultimately paper. Early texts were written on scrolls, but with the rise of Christianity the codex came to dominate. Almost all surviving manuscripts are incomplete (fragmentary) codices. Scrolls continued to be used into the Christian period for magical texts. There are also some short works, such as school texts, found on ostraca and boards.

Most manuscripts have been recovered from abandoned monasteries, the most important being the White Monastery. The Morgan Collection comprises 58 volumes discovered in 1910 in the library of the Monastery of Saint Michael in the Fayyum. The local library collection consists of some 5000 volumes, a few fragments of which have been acquired by the Egyptian Museum in Cairo.

== Origins ==
=== Old Coptic ===
Efforts to write Coptic in the Greek alphabet probably began in the 1st century BC. The earliest text known is from the 1st century AD. This first phase of written Coptic is called Old Coptic and lasts into the 4th or 5th century. The earliest stage of experimentation with the Egyptian language in the Greek alphabet is often called Pre-Old Coptic or Graeco-Egyptian. Other authors distinguish between early and late Old Coptic.

Old Coptic consists of pagan writings of a magical or divinatory nature. These texts lack the consistent script style and borrowed Greek vocabulary of later Coptic literature, which is entirely Christian or para-Christian (i.e., Gnostic and Manichaean). Some use exclusively Greek letters, with none of the borrowed Demotic letters of standard Coptic, while others use more Demotic letters than became standard. The production of pagan magical texts written in Egyptian in Greek letters continued into the period of Coptic literature proper.

=== Rise of literary Coptic ===
One traditional theory links the origin of literary Coptic to the Gnostic community in Alexandria. No surviving Coptic manuscript, however, can be linked to Alexandria. Another links it to Christian monasteries and the need to translate Greek teaching into the vernacular. The high proportion of borrowed Greek vocabulary in early Coptic texts, however, makes their practical utility as translations questionable. More recently, it has been suggested that the revival of Egyptian as a literary language (in the form of Coptic) was part of an "effort to revive a national Egyptian culture." Paola Buzi refers to it as an "identity operation", an assertion of distinctness. Conversely, since the rise of the Coptic writing system paralleled the rise of Christianity, it may have been stimulated by desire to distance itself from the pagan associations of traditional Egyptian writing.

Literary Coptic first appears in the 3rd century. The earliest literary texts are translations of Greek texts, either Christian or Gnostic. The five literary texts dated to the 3rd century are all biblical, either marginal annotations to Greek bibles or bilingual Greek–Coptic biblical texts. There is a single documentary text, a private letter on an ostracon, dated to this century.

=== Appearance of original compositions ===
There are several possible candidates for earliest Coptic author. According to the Panarion of Epiphanius of Salamis, the 3rd-century writer Hierakas wrote works of biblical exegesis and psalmody in Greek and Coptic. The only surviving work attributed to him is of dubious authenticity.

The first author in literary Coptic whose works survives may be Anthony the Great (died 356). Seven of his authentic letters are known, some in Coptic fragments. They were also translated into Latin from Greek. No Greek version survives and it is not known if some or all of them were originally composed in Greek or Coptic. These letters demonstrate Anthony's familiarity with the controversies engulfing the contemporary church, including that over Arianism. They would provide a link, otherwise unattested, between the origins of Coptic literature and Alexandrian theology.

The earliest certain original author with surviving works is Pachomius the Great (died 346). He wrote rules for a community of monks that was translated into Latin by Jerome. Only a few fragments survive of the original Coptic version of the rule, but several of Pachomius' letters in Coptic are preserved. These "represent the oldest original Coptic texts with true literary characteristics."

== Translations ==
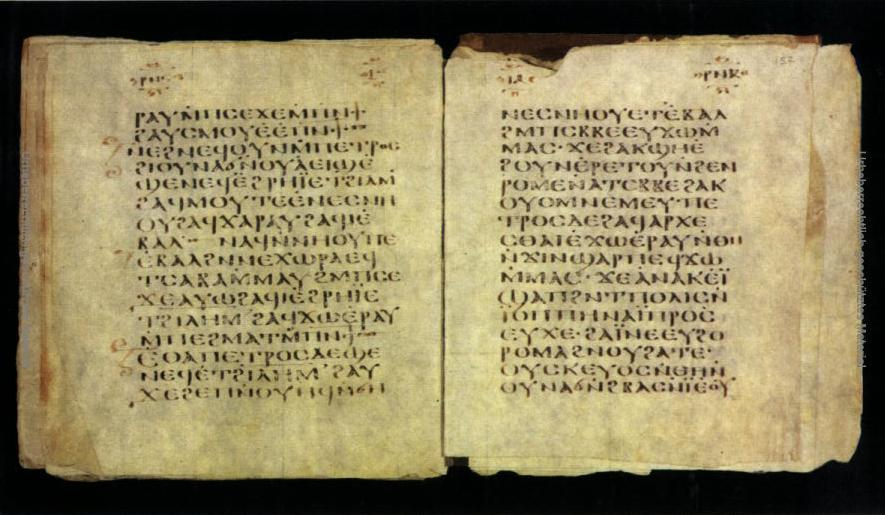
The biblical Codex Glazier of the 4th or 5th century

=== Biblical translations ===
The Bible was translated into Coptic from the Greek Septuagint and New Testament. It may have been the earliest literary text put into Coptic. The history of its translation can be divided into three phases. Between the 2nd and 4th centuries, many individuals were working on translations in many dialects. In the 4th and 5th centuries, the Sahidic translation was standardized. Finally, by the 9th century, the Bohairic translation was standardized. By the early 4th century, the Bible in Coptic—or at least the Psalms and New Testament—was in official use in the churches.

The circumstances of the earliest translation work are obscure. The relatively early standardization of the Sahidic text, which remains largely unchanged throughout Coptic history, attests to the high standards of the original translation work.

=== Gnostic and Manichaean texts ===
Coptic translations of Gnostic and Manichaean texts date from the same period as the early biblical translations and demonstrate a diversity of thought and community at the earliest stage of Coptic literary production. The most important collection of Gnostic or "gnosticizing" texts is the Nag Hammadi library. There are also the Askew Codex, Berlin Codex and Bruce Codex. The quality of Gnostic texts is generally lower than that of orthodox Christian ones. Their orthography is less consistent and they contain more grammatical errors. On the whole, they are less professional productions. Shenoute's Against the Origenists shows, however, that such texts were widely read in orthodox communities.

Manichaeism was introduced to Egypt around 350. Within a few decades they began translating their texts into Coptic, some from the Aramaic originals and sometimes from Greek intermediaries. This makes the Manichaean translations slightly later than the Gnostic and biblical texts. The Manichaean manuscripts all date from the 4th and 5th centuries and all were found at Medinet Madi, although they were most likely produced at Lycopolis, since they were written in the Lycopolitan dialect. They include the Manichaean Psalter and the Kephalaia among others.

=== Prognostic texts ===
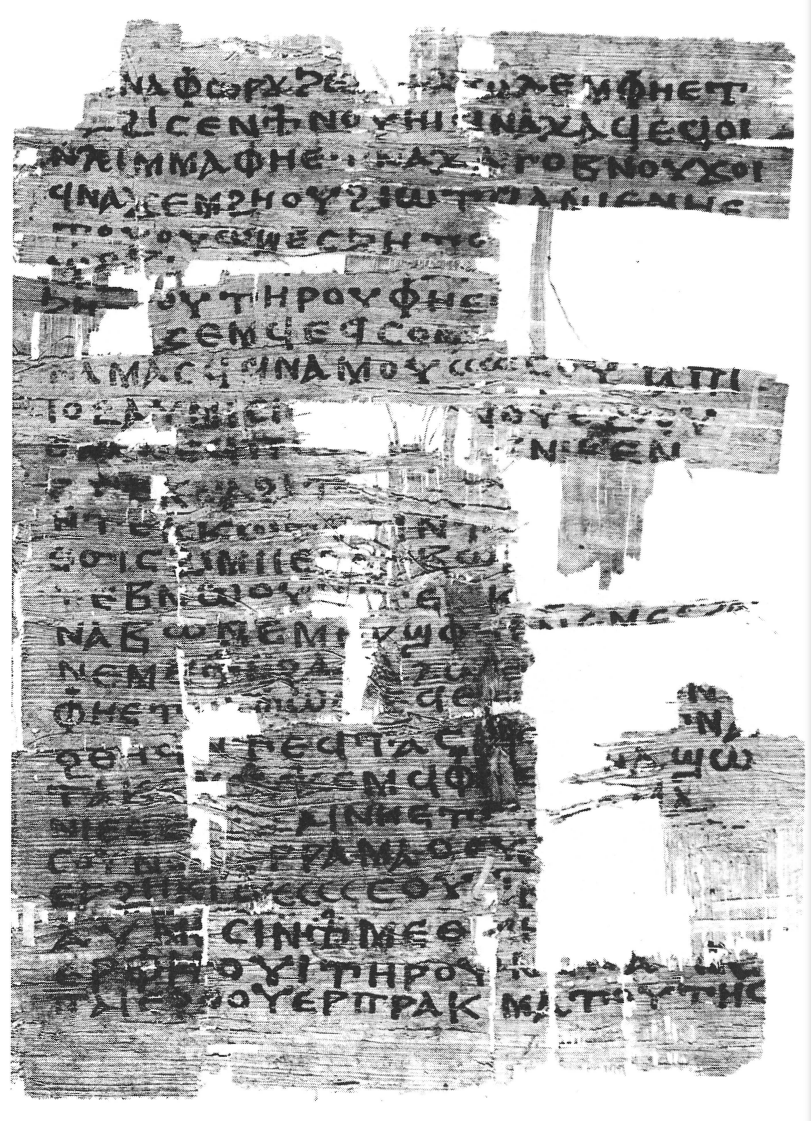
Fragment of a Bohairic hemerologion

A variety of prognostic texts are known in Coptic. These include hemerologia (which give prognostications for each day of the lunar month) and kalandologia (which give predictions for the year based on the day of the week on which it begins or the direction of the wind during the first week). The first day of the year is regarded as the sixth day of the month of Ṭūba, which corresponded to the first (kalends) of January, the official start of the year in the Roman Empire. These texts are derived or translated from Greek originals. They are also influenced by concept of Tagewählerei (lucky and unlucky days) in the ancient Egyptian calendar. Predictions relating to the flow of the Nile are a distinctly Egyptian feature.

Fragments of hemerologia and kalandologia in Sahidic are found on papyrus, parchment and paper from the 6th–12th centuries. Predictions based on the day of the week and the direction of the wind are often found in the same manuscript. There are also Bohairic papyrus fragments from the 6th–8th centuries.

=== Biblical apocrypha ===
Coptic translations are an important source of both Old Testament apocrypha and New Testament apocrypha. In some cases, the Coptic is the main or only witness to a text, as in the Gospel of Judas. There were two main phases in the production of Coptic apocrypha. In the first, in the 4th century, the works translated were mainly associated with founding figures like Peter and Paul. In a second phase, in the 5th century, a new genre of "apostolic memoir" appears. The Gospel of the Saviour is an example of an apocryphal text composed in Coptic after the Council of Chalcedon (451).

Examples of Old Testament apocrypha in Coptic include Wisdom of Solomon, Testament of Abraham, Testament of Isaac, Testament of Jacob, Ascension of Isaiah, Apocalypse of Moses, Apocalypse of Elijah and Apocalypse of Zephaniah. New Testament apocrypha include Gospel of Thomas, Gospel of Nicodemus, Gospel of Bartholomew, Gospel of Mary, Epistula Apostolorum, Protevangelium of James, Letter of Abgar to Jesus, Acts of Paul, Acts of Peter, Acts of John, Acts of Andrew, Acts of Pilate and Apocalypse of Paul. The selection of New Testament apocrypha suggests direct contacts with Asia unmediated by Alexandria. The Apocalypse of Elijah and Ascension of Isaiah, however, are native Egyptian works.

=== Patristics ===
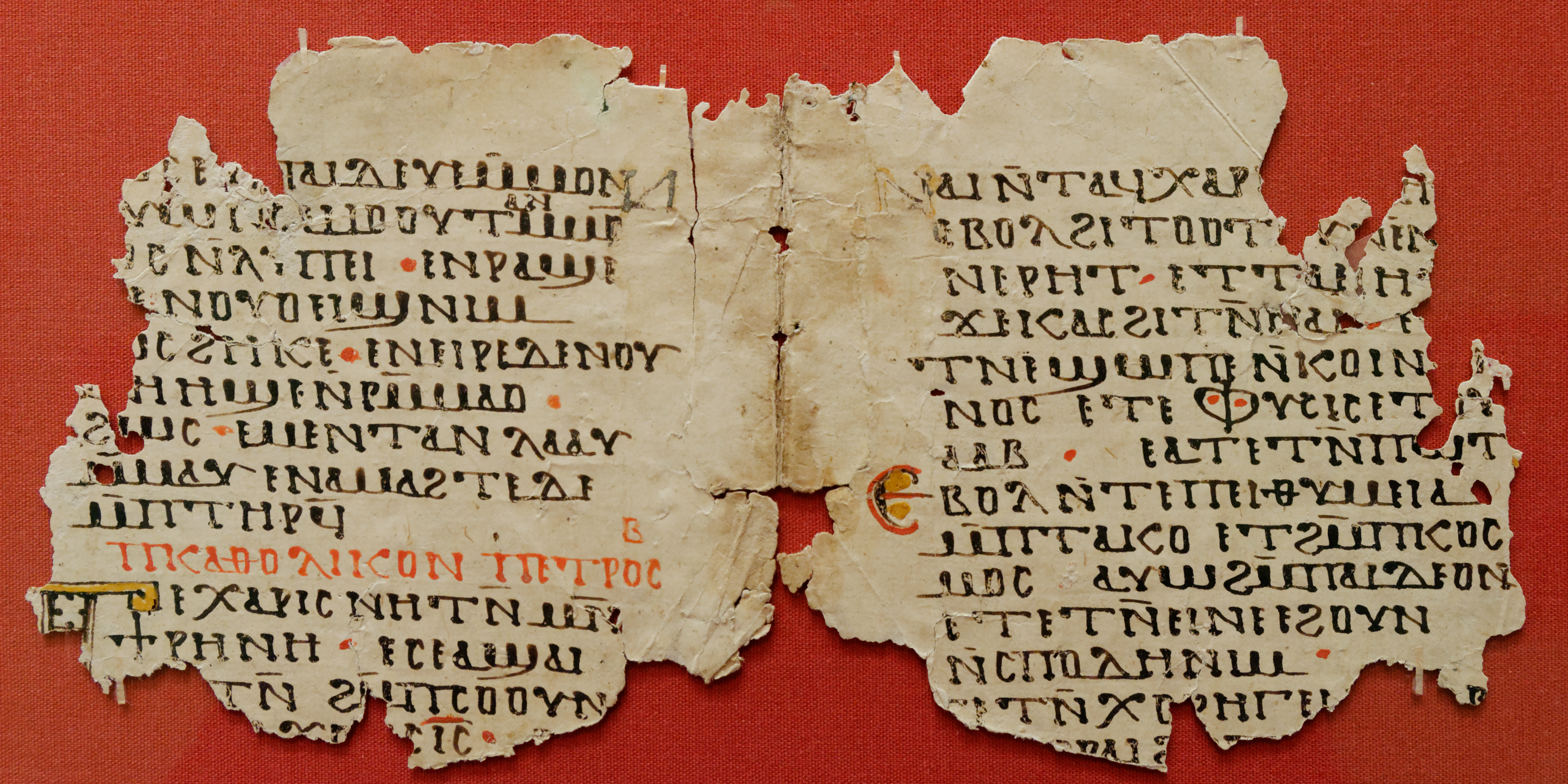
7th-century liturgical codex from the White Monastery

The earliest translation of the Church Fathers into Coptic also date from the period of the first biblical translations, the 2nd and 3rd centuries. One of the earliest manuscripts of such works is the Crosby-Schøyen Codex. Most, however, date to a slightly later phase, the 4th through 6th centuries. The translations were notably selective, with a stronger preference for the "edifying and pastoral" over the "theological and exegetical". The earliest identifiable are the homilies De pascha and De anima et corpore by Melito of Sardis and the Pseudo-Basilian De templo Salomonis.

From the later period, the Cappadocian Fathers are well represented (Basil of Caesarea, Gregory of Nyssa and Gregory of Nazianzus), as are Athanasius of Alexandria, Cyril of Alexandria, Ephrem the Syrian, Epiphanius of Salamis and John Chrysostom. Also translated are the Apostolic Fathers and Hippolytus of Rome. There is a Coptic version of the Sayings of the Desert Fathers. Notably absent are works by two of the most outstanding early Egyptian Christian writers, Clement of Alexandria and Origen, although the Berlin Coptic Book of anonymous treatises shows traces of Clementine thought. Works were generally treated individually and rarely was a whole body of work translated, although there are corpora of homilies by Basil of Caesarea, Gregory of Nyssa and Severus of Antioch.

Pseudepigraphy—false attribution—is common in Coptic literature, especially with the writings of the Fathers. Melito's On the Soul and Body was re-titled and misattributed to Athanasius, probably to raise his profile. Among Athanasius authentic works, the Life of Anthony and the Festal Letters were translated, but none of his historical works or writings against Arianism. Cyril's theologically weighty Scholia de incarnatione unigeniti was translated, but not his writings against Nestorianism.

Some patristic works were translated into both Sahidic and Bohairic, although it is not known if the Bohairic translations were made from the Greek originals or from the Sahidic versions.

=== Romances ===
The only non-religious literary texts in Coptic are two romances: the Alexander Romance and the Cambyses Romance.

Translated from Greek, the Coptic Alexander attained its definitive form in the 6th century. What survives is a fragmentary text from the White Monastery. The original manuscript had 220 pages and was divided into 37 chapters, each introduced with a verse from the Bible. The surviving fragments concern Alexander among the Elamites, his rescue from the abyss in Gedrosia, his meeting the Brahmans and his poisoning. Alexander is treated as a prophet who foreshadowed Christ and the romance was clearly intended for monks' reading.

The Cambyses Romance is an original work in Coptic. It survives only in a fragmentary manuscript. It is probably a product of Egyptian monasticism also, but its themes are "rooted in a long Egyptian religious tradition that pits the forces of Chaos against those of Order". It can be dated to between the 5th and 9th centuries.

The hagiographical Legend of Hilaria has sometimes been classified as a romance.

== Original writings ==
=== Pachomius and his milieu ===
The writings of Pachomius the Great and his milieu form a distinctive body of work that was early translated into Greek. It is preserved on scrolls and rolls of the 4th to 6th centuries, often made with recycled parchment or papyrus.

Pachomius' rules for communal monastic living, inspired in part by his Roman military background, were a major influence on European monasticism. His literary influence, however, was relatively meagre. Besides his rules and letters, there are also letters of his disciples Theodorus of Tabennese and Horsiesi. Horsiesi also wrote a book, known as the Liber Orsiesii, in which the Pachomian style attains its most literary form. He also wrote a set of rules. Both Pachomius and Horsiesi make use of the "spiritual alphabet", an alphabetic cipher.

Two later and anonymous texts belong to the Pachomian tradition, the Apocalypse of Kiarur and the Visit of Horsiesi (which may have been originally written in Greek). A biography of Pachomius, originally written in Coptic, survives in a later Bohairic version and in translations in Greek, Latin and Arabic.

=== Shenoute and his milieu ===
The monk Shenoute (died 465), head of the White Monastery, was "perhaps the most prolific writer" in the Coptic language. He is its "one truly remarkable individual author", whose writing is by far "its most sophisticated". He raised Coptic to the rank of literary language. He was, however, almost unknown outside the Coptic tradition. His works were never translated into Greek. They were gradually brought to the attention of western scholars between about 1750 and 1900.

Shenoute made unprecedented use of features of Coptic grammar not directly translatable into Greek. His writing is highly literary and often difficult. He received a classical education in rhetoric and was influenced by the Greek style of the Second Sophistic. He quotes extensively from the Bible, especially the wisdom books, the Gospels and the Pauline epistles. In one place, he quotes The Birds of Aristophanes. He wrote treatises against Gnosticism, Manichaeism, Origenism and Melitianism.

Shenoute's writings are divided into two collections, the nine-volume Canons, which are addressed to his monastic community and mainly concern discipline, and the eight-volume Discourses, which are addressed to outsiders and mainly concern ethics. His letters are a separate collection that may not have been supervised by him. This tripartite classification was apparently made by him. He also prohibited his works from being disseminated outside his monastic federation, limiting their impact. They were, however, highly revered there, since the manuscript tradition reveals very few variants, indicating that they were treated almost on par with the Bible. His influence on Coptic literature may extend beyond his own writings, if his monastery was also the site of many translations of Greek works, as Tito Orlandi has argued.

Shenoute was succeeded as head of the White Monastery by Besa. Several of his letters and sermons, written in Shenoutean style, survive. His work is less colourful than his predecessor's although equally refined. Besa's writings, unlike Shenoute's, belong mainly to the period after the Council of Chalcedon (451).

Shenoute's biography, the Vita Sinuthii, has been falsely attributed to Besa. It is a collection of various stories of independent and anonymous authorship and questionable historical value.

=== Magic ===
There are approximately 600 surviving magical or ritual manuscripts in Coptic from between the 4th and 12th centuries. Coptic magic originates as translations from the Greek tradition. The vast majority of manuscripts come from a Christian milieu. Many of the texts probably date to the period of Coptic literary creativity in the 6th century (often associated with Patriarch Damian of Alexandria).

The copying and composition of magical texts in Coptic declined with the rise of Arabic and Islam. Texts ceased to be produced in the 12th century.

=== Later literature ===
Coptic writing after 451 is mostly non-Chalcedonian, theologically miaphysite and hence isolate from the Chalcedonian mainstream. Important writers from the latter half of the 5th century include Paul of Tamma, Paphnute, Makarius of Tkow and Patriarch Timothy II of Alexandria.

The next most pivotal moment in Coptic history after Chalcedon was the Arab conquest of Egypt in 641, which placed the Copts under Islamic rule and introduced Arabic. Its immediate impact on Coptic literature, however, was small. Important Coptic writers from the latter half of the 7th century include the Patriarchs Benjamin I and Agathon, Samuel of Qalamun, Isaac of Qalamun, John of Nikiu and Menas of Nikiu. Official documents and correspondence were sometimes written in Coptic into the Abbasid period in the late 8th century.

Coptic seems to have been in decline as a literary language by the early 9th century, since few original works later than that can be attributed to a named author. For reasons not fully understood, it was moribund as a language of original composition by the 11th century. Much Coptic literature is now lost, as the Copts began to use Arabic. Texts such as the Apocalypse of Samuel of Kalamoun deplore the loss of Coptic, but are themselves now only extant in Arabic.

=== Coptic in Arabic ===
William Worrell argues that Coptic went through three stages in its contact with Arabic. First, it borrowed the odd Arabic word. Second, while still a living language, some texts were written in Arabic but in Coptic script. Finally, after having been completely supplanted as the spoken language by Arabic, Coptic was rendered as needed in Arabic script.

A major movement to translate Coptic works into Arabic began around 1000 or shortly before and lasted into the 13th century. Many bilingual church texts with Bohairic on the left and Arabic on the right are a product of this period. During the period of translation, Coptic was still widely and deeply understood. In the 13th–14th centuries, as knowledge of Coptic declined, grammars of the language, called "prefaces", and word lists, called "ladders", were written in Arabic to help priests read and pronounce Coptic.

== Relation to earlier Egyptian literature ==
Greek had been dominant language of writing in Egypt for centuries before the rise of Coptic and "Greek literature was at the base of Coptic literature." Nevertheless, certain connections have been proposed between Coptic literature and earlier Egyptian literature. The rules of Pachomius contain a quotation from the "Negative Confession" in the Book of the Dead and possible allusions to the Teaching of Ani and the Instructions of Amenemope. This may not reflect familiarity with ancient literature or even readership, but may be "a pale memory" picked up during Pachomius' education in "Egyptian letters". The Cambyses Romance may also owe something to Demotic literature. Its conflation of Assyrians and Persians is also found in the Oracle of the Potter and the Oracle of the Lamb.

The Legend of Hilaria has been seen as a reworking of the Tale of Bentresh.

== See also ==
- Coptic philosophy
- Late antique literature

== Sources ==
- Bagnall, Roger S.; Cribiore, Raffaella (2006). Women's Letters from Ancient Egypt, 300 BC–AD 800. University of Michigan Press.
- Boud'hors, Anne (2012). "The Coptic Tradition". In Scott Fitzgerald Johnson (ed.). The Oxford Handbook of Late Antiquity. Oxford University Press. pp. 224–246.
- Boud'hors, Anne (2018). "Coptic Literature". In Oliver Nicholson (ed.). The Oxford Dictionary of Late Antiquity. Oxford University Press.
- Brakke, David (2018). "Coptic". In Scott McGill; Edward J. Watts (eds.). A Companion to Late Antique Literature. John Wiley & Sons. pp. 61–74. doi:10.1002/9781118830390.ch4. ISBN 9781118830390. S2CID 240297072.
- Buzi, Paola, ed. (2020). Coptic Literature in Context (4th–13th cent.): Cultural Landscape, Literary Production, and Manuscript Archaeology. Edizioni Quasar.
- Buzi, Paola (2021). "Literature, Coptic: Update". The Coptic Encyclopedia. Claremont Graduate University.
- Depuydt, Leo (2010). "Coptic and Coptic Literature". In Alan B. Lloyd (ed.). A Companion to Ancient Egypt. Blackwell. pp. 732–754. doi:10.1002/9781444320053.ch33. ISBN 9781444320053.
- Dosoo, Korshi; Preininger, Markéta, eds. (2023). Papyri Copticae Magicae: Coptic Magical Texts. Vol. 1: Formularies. De Gruyter. doi:10.1515/9783111080109.
- Emmel, Stephen (2007). "Coptic Literature in the Byzantine and Early Islamic World". In Roger S. Bagnall (ed.). Egypt in the Byzantine World, 300–700. Cambridge University Press. pp. 83–102.
- Fournet, Jean-Luc (2020). The Rise of Coptic: Egyptian versus Greek in Late Antiquity. Princeton University Press.
- Ghica, Victor (2016). "Two Newcomers in the B5 Family: The Naqlūn Kalandologia". In Paola Buzi; Alberto Camplani; Federico Contardi (eds.). Coptic Society, Literature and Religion from Late Antiquity to Modern Times. Peeters Publishers. pp. 1339–1348.
- Hyvernat, Eugène Xavier Louis Henri (1913). "Coptic Literature" . Catholic Encyclopedia. Vol. 16.
- MacCoull, Leslie S. B. (1991). "Coptic Language and Literature". In Alexander Kazhdan (ed.). The Oxford Dictionary of Byzantium. Oxford University Press.
- Meyer, Marvin; Smith, Richard, eds. (1999). Ancient Christian Magic: Coptic Texts of Ritual Power. Princeton University Press.
- Müller, Detlef (1991). "Romances". In Aziz Suryal Atiya (ed.). The Coptic Encyclopedia. Vol. 7. New York: Macmillan Publishers. cols. 2059b–2061a.
- O'Leary, De Lacy (1930). "Litterature Copte". Dictionnaire d'archéologie chrétienne et de liturgie. Vol. 9, Part 2. Paris: Librairie Letouzey et Ané. col. 1599–1635.
- Orlandi, Tito (1986). "Coptic Literature". In Birger A. Pearson; James E. Goehring (eds.). The Roots of Egyptian Christianity. Fortress Press. pp. 51–81.
- Orlandi, Tito (1991a). "Calendologia". In Aziz Suryal Atiya (ed.). The Coptic Encyclopedia. Vol. 5. New York: Macmillan Publishers. cols. 444b–445a.
- Orlandi, Tito (1991b). "Literature, Coptic". In Aziz Suryal Atiya (ed.). The Coptic Encyclopedia. Vol. 5. New York: Macmillan Publishers. cols. 1450b–1460a.
- Orlandi, Tito (2013). "A Terminology for the Identification of Coptic Literary Documents". Journal of Coptic Studies. 15: 87–94. doi:10.2143/JCS.15.0.3005414.
- Orlandi, Tito (2016). "Coptic". In Daniel L. Selden; Phiroze Vasunia (eds.). The Oxford Handbook of the Literatures of the Roman Empire. Oxford University Press.
- Palombo, Cecilia (2022). "Embedding Conquest: Naturalizing Muslim Rule in the Early Islamic Empire" (PDF). Medieval Worlds. 17: 198–216. doi:10.1553/medievalworlds_no17_2022s198. S2CID 254356682.
- Papaconstantinou, Arietta (2021). "Coptic". In Stratis Papaioannou (ed.). The Oxford Handbook of Byzantine Literature. Oxford University Press. pp. 571–588.
- Wilfong, Terry G. (2001). "Coptic Literature". In Donald B. Redford (ed.). The Oxford Encyclopedia of Ancient Egypt. Oxford University Press.
- Worrell, William H. (1934). Coptic Sounds. University of Michigan Press.
- Youssef, Youhanna Nessim (2014). "Coptic Literature". In Gawdat Gabra (ed.). Coptic Civilization: Two Thousand Years of Christianity in Egypt. American University in Cairo Press. pp. 123–130.
