= Jewish apocrypha and pseudepigrapha =

Books not accepted as sacred manuscripts in Judaism

The Jewish apocrypha and pseudepigrapha (Hebrew: הַסְּפָרִים הַחִיצוֹנִיִּים, romanized: ha-səfārîm ha-ḥîṣônîyîm, lit. 'the external books') are religious texts written in large part by Jews, especially during the Second Temple period, not accepted as sacred manuscripts when the Hebrew Bible was canonized. Some of these books are considered sacred in certain Christian denominations and are included in their versions of the Old Testament. The Jewish apocrypha is distinctive from the New Testament apocrypha and Christian biblical apocrypha as it is the only one of these collections which works within a Jewish theological framework.

== Apocrypha and pseudepigrapha in Judaism ==
Some sects of Second Temple Judaism, such as the Essenes in Judaea and the Therapeutae in Alexandria, were said to have a "secret or hidden" literature. The Pharisees were familiar with these texts. The Apocalyptic literature is an example of this secret literature. Because they were based on unfulfilled prophecies, these books were not considered scripture but rather part of a literary form that flourished from 200 BCE to 100 CE. These works usually bore the names of ancient Hebrew worthies to establish their validity among the contemporaries of the true writers.

2 Esdras—a Greek text purportedly written by Ezra and not considered scripture in Judaism—reinforces this theory. When Ezra was inspired to dictate the sacred scriptures that were destroyed in the overthrow of Jerusalem:

So during the forty days, ninety-four books were written. And when the forty days were ended, the Most High spoke to me, saying, "Make public the twenty-four books that you wrote first and let the worthy and the unworthy read them; but keep the seventy that were written last, in order to give them to the wise among your people. For in them is the spring of understanding, the fountain of wisdom, and the river of knowledge."

Writings that were wholly apart from scriptural texts were designated as Hitsonim (lit. 'external') by Chazal in tractate Sanhedrin, and reading them was controversial. The Talmud also generally discourages the reading of apocrypha; it's debated if one should merely avoid elevating apocrypha to the level of scripture, or if one is not to read apocrypha at all. In the following centuries, these apocrypha fell out of use in Judaism.

== Books ==
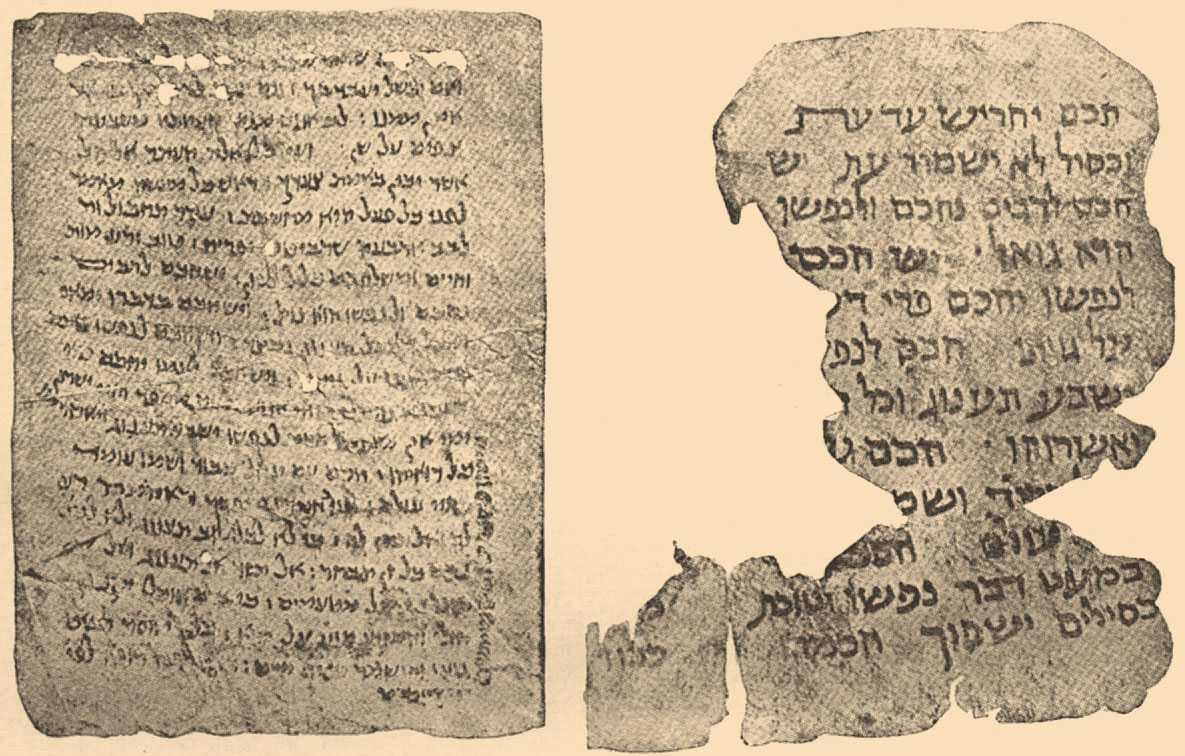
Fragments of the manuscript of Ben Sira

=== Hebrew and Greek ===
- 1 Baruch (סֵפֶר בָּרוּךְ, səp̄er bārûḵ, 'Book of Baruch')
- 2 Baruch (חֲזוֹן בָּרוּךְ א׳, ḥăzôn bārûḵ ʾā, 'Vision of Baruch I')
- 3 Baruch (חֲזוֹן בָּרוּךְ ב׳, ḥăzôn bārûḵ bē, 'Vision of Baruch II')
- 1 Enoch (סֵפֶר חֲנוֹךְ א׳, səp̄er ḥănôḵ ʾā, 'Book of Enoch I')
- 2 Enoch (סֵפֶר חֲנוֹךְ ב׳, səp̄er ḥănôḵ bē, 'Book of Enoch II')
- 3 Enoch (סֵפֶר חֲנוֹךְ ג׳, səp̄er ḥănôḵ gā, 'Book of Enoch III')
- 1 Esdras (עֶזְרָא הַחִיצוֹנִי, ʿezrā ha-ḥîṣônî, 'External Ezra')
- 2 Esdras (חֲזוֹן עֶזְרָא, ḥăzôn ʿezrā, 'Vision of Ezra')
- 1 Maccabees (סֵפֶר מַקָּבִים א׳, səp̄er maqqāḇîm ʾā, 'Book of Maccabees I')
- 2 Maccabees (סֵפֶר מַקָּבִים ב׳, səp̄er maqqāḇîm bē, 'Book of Maccabees II')
- 3 Maccabees (סֵפֶר מַקָּבִים ג׳, səp̄er maqqāḇîm gā, 'Book of Maccabees III')
- 4 Maccabees (סֵפֶר מַקָּבִים ד׳, səp̄er maqqāḇîm dā, 'Book of Maccabees IV')
- Additions to the Book of Esther (תּוֹסָפוֹת לְמַגִּילַת אֶסְתֵּר, tôsāfôt lə-maggīlāt ʾestēr)
- Additions to Daniel (תּוֹסָפוֹת לְסֵפֶר דָּנִיֵּאל, tôsāfôt lə-sēp̄er dānîyēl)
- Apocalypse of Abraham (חֲזוֹן אַחֲרִית הַיָּמִים שֶׁל אַבְרָהָם, ḥăzôn ʾaḥărît ha-yāmîm šel ʾavrāhām, 'Vision of the End of Days of Abraham')
- Apocryphon of Jannes and Jambres (אֲפוֹקרִיפוֹן יָנֵס וִימְבְּרֵס, apôqrîp̄ôn yānēs wîmbrēs)
- Ascension of Isaiah (עֲלִיָּת יְשַׁעְיָהוּ, ʿălîyāt yəšaʿyāhû)
- Assumption of Moses (עֲלִיַּת מֹשֶׁה, ʿălîyāt mōšeh, 'Ascension of Moses')
- Book of Gad the Seer (דִּבְרֵי גָּד הַחוֹזֶה, dibrê gād ha-ḥōzê, 'Words of Gad the Seer')
- Book of Jubilees (סֵפֶר הַיּוֹבְלִים, səp̄er ha-yôvlîm)
- Book of Judith (סֵפֶר יְהוּדִית, səp̄er yəhûdît)
- Book of Tobit (סֵפֶר טוֹבִיָּה, səp̄er ṭôvîyāh)
- Book of Wisdom (חָכְמַת שְׁלֹמֹה, ḥôḵmat šəlômô, 'Wisdom of Solomon')
- Genesis Apocryphon (מְגִלָּה חִיצוֹנִית לְבְרֵאשִׁית, məgillāh ḥîṣônît lə-vrēšît, 'External Scroll to Genesis')
- History of the Captivity in Babylon (תּוֹלְדוֹת שְׁבוּת בָּבֶל, tôldôt šĕvût bāvel)
- Joseph and Aseneth (יוֹסֵף וְאֶסְנֶת, yôsēp̄ wə-ʾesnêt)
- Letter of Aristeas (אִיגֶּרֶת אַרִיסְטִיאַס, ʾiggēret ʾārîstîās, 'Letter of Aristeas')
- Letter of Jeremiah (אִיגֶּרֶת יִרְמְיָהוּ, ʾiggēret yirməyāhû)
- Liber Antiquitatum Biblicarum (קַדְמוֹנוּיוֹת הַמִּקְרָא, qadmônûyôt ha-miqrāʾ, 'Biblical Antiquities')
- Life of Adam and Eve (סֵפֶר אָדָם וְחַוָּה, səp̄er ʾādām wə-ḥawwāh, 'Book of Adam and Eve')
- Prayer of Manasseh (תְּפִלַּת מְנַשֶּׁה, təp̄illat mĕnaššēh)
- Psalm 151 (תְּהִלִּים קנ״א, təhillîm qānʾā)
- Psalms 152–155 (תְּהִלִּים קנ״ב–קנ״ה, təhillîm qānʾēh–qānʾāh)
- Psalms of Solomon (מִזְמוֹרֵי שְׁלֹמֹה, mizmorê šəlômô)
- Book of Sirach (בֶּן סִירָא, ben sîrā, 'Ben Sira')
- Testament of Abraham (צְוַת אַבְרָהָם, ṣəvāt ʾavrāhām)
- Testament of Job (דִּבְרֵי אִיּוֹב, dibrê ʾiyyôḇ, 'Words of Job')
- Testament of Qahat (צְוַת קְהָת, ṣəvāt qəhāt)
- Testaments of the Twelve Patriarchs (צְוָאוֹת הַשְּׁבָטִים, ṣəvāʾôt ha-šĕvaṭîm, 'Testaments of the Tribes')
- Visions of Amram (חֲזוֹן עַמְרָם, ḥăzôn ʿamrām, 'Vision of Amram')
- Gabriel's Revelation (גִּלּוּי גַּבְרִיאֵל, gillûy gavriʾēl, 'Revelation of Gabriel')

=== Geʿez/Haymanot ===
Texts accepted by or originating from Haymanot Jews:

- Testaments of Abraham, Isaac, Jacob, Moses, and Aaron (צְוָאוֹת אַבְרָהָם יִצְחָק יַעֲקֹב מֹשֶׁה וְאַהֲרֹן, ṣəvāʾôt ʾavrāhām yiṣḥāq yaʿăqōḇ mōšeh wə-ʾahărōn)
- Nagara Muse (Ge'ez: ናጋራ ሙሴ, romanized: nāgārā musē, lit. 'Conversation of Moses')
- Təʾəzazä Sänbät (ተእዛዛ ሰንበት, təʾəzazā sänbät, 'Commandments of Shabbat')
- Arde'et (አርድእት, ʾardəʾet, 'Disciples')
- Barok (ባሮክ, bārôq, '[book of] Baruch')
- Fālasfā (ፋላስፋ, 'Philosophers')
- Abba Eliyas (አባ ኤልያስ, ʾabbā ʾēliyās, 'Father Elijah')
- Mäṣḥafä Mälaʾəkt (መጽሐፈ መላእክት, 'Book of the Angels')
- Dərsanä Abrəham Wäsara Bägabs (ድርሳነ አብርሃም ወሣራ በግብፅ, 'Homily on Abraham and Sarah in Egypt')
- Gadla Sosna (ጋድላ ሶስና, gadlâ sôsna, 'Story of Susanna')
- Baqadāmi Gabra Egzi’a'ḥēr (በቀዳሚ ገብረ እግዚአብሔር, 'In the Beginning God Created')

== See also ==
- Apocrypha
- Pseudepigrapha
- Deuterocanonical books
