= Haymanot =

Branch of Judaism practiced by the Beta Israel

Regions with significant populations
- Ethiopia
- Israel

Scriptures
- Mäṣḥafä Kedus

Languages
- Geʽez, Amharic, Hebrew

Haymanot (Ge'ez: ሃይማኖት; Hebrew: דָּת, romanized: dat, lit. 'religion') is the branch of Judaism practiced by the Beta Israel, or Ethiopian Jews.

In Geʽez, Tigrinya and Amharic, Haymanot means 'religion' or 'faith'. Thus in modern Amharic and Tigrinya, it is common to speak of the Christian haymanot, the Jewish haymanot or the Muslim haymanot. In Israel, the term is only associated with Judaism.

== Religious leaders ==
- Nabi: 'prophet', related to Hebrew naví
- Haḫem: Hebrew hakham. A wise man skillful in Torah study; sometimes an intermediary in the community for religious disputes
- Kahen or qes: the Geʿez equivalent of Hebrew kohen ('priest'). The role of the qes in Haymanot Judaism is similar to that of a rabbi in Rabbinic Judaism
- Liqä kahənat (High Priest); translated into Hebrew as qes ha-qesim
- Abba, honorific title for ascetic renunciates
- Debtera (Ge'ez: däbtära): "unconsecrated religious scholars, also renowned for their skill as healers and scribes"
- Šǝmagǝlle ('elder'); pl. šǝmagǝlločč

== Texts ==
Mäṣḥafä Qedus (Ge'ez: መጽሐፈ ቅዱስ, lit. 'holy scriptures'; Hebrew: כתבי הקודש, romanized: Kitvei ha-Qodesh) is the term used when referring to the Haymanot textual corpus. The written language of the texts is Geʽez. The Beta Israel lack a firm distinction between canonical and non-canonical religious texts. The scriptures of the Beta Israel include:

- The Orit (ኦሪት, '[Written] Torah'; Jewish Babylonian Aramaic: אוֹרַיְתָא, romanized: orāytā, lit. 'teaching' or 'instruction' or 'Torah'): known as the Octateuch (אוקטאטוכוס, Octatochos) in Haymanot, it consists of the five books of the Pentateuch (i.e., the book of Genesis, the book of Exodus, the book of Leviticus, the book of Numbers, and the book of Deuteronomy) plus the book of Joshua, the book of Judges, and the book of Ruth
- The Five Books of Solomon (መጽሐፍ ሰሎሞን, Mäṣḥafä Sälomon):
  - Chapters 1–24 of the book of Proverbs (መሳልያተ ሰሎሞን, Mesályata Salomon, 'Parables of Solomon')
  - Chapters 25–31 of the book of Proverbs (ታግሳሰ ሰሎሞን, Tagsása Salomon, 'Collections of Solomon')
- The book of Ecclesiastes (መጽሐፈ ቃለ ሰሎሞን, Mäṣḥafä Qalä Salomon, 'Words of Solomon')
- The Song of Solomon (መጽሐፈ እንተ ሰሎሞን, Mäṣḥafä ʾEntä Salomon, 'Song which is Solomon's')
- The book of Wisdom (መጽሐፈ ሰብእ, Mäṣḥafä Säbʾə), which is not included in the non-Haymanot Jewish canon or the Protestant Bible used by Protestant Christians
- The Testaments of the Patriarchs (መጽሐፈ አባቶች, Mäṣḥafä Abatočč)
- Təʾəzazä Sänbät (ትእዛዝ ሰንበት, 'Commandments of Shabbat')
- Nagara Muse (ነገረ ሙሴ, 'Conversation of Moses')
- The books of Samuel
- The books of Kings
- The books of the Twelve Minor Prophets
- The book of Psalms (תהילים לדוד, Tehillim l'David, 'Psalms of David'; መዝሙረ ዳዊት, Mazmura Dawit)
- The book of Isaiah
- A unique form of the book of Jeremiah (Note: The Ethiopian Book of Jeremiah, which is shared with the Beta Israel, also includes the book of Baruch and the Rest of the Words of Baruch, the latter of which contains the book of Lamentations, the Letter of Jeremiah, and 4 Baruch).)
- The book of Ezekiel
- The book of Daniel
- The books of Chronicles
- Ezra–Nehemiah
- The book of Job
- Books that are grouped with the Jewish apocrypha and pseudepigrapha in Rabbinic Judaism but considered canonical in some Christian denominations:
  - The book Sirach
  - The book of Esther
  - The book of Judith
  - The book of Tobit
  - 1 Esdras and 2 Esdras
  - The books of Meqabyan (three books unique to Beta Israel; מקבים, Maccabim, 'Maccabees'; መጽሐፈ ሜቃብያን, Mäṣḥafä Meqabyan)
  - The book of Jubilees (ספר היובלים, Sefer ha-Yovlim; መጽሐፈ ኩፋሌ, Mäṣḥafä Kufale)
  - The book of Enoch (ספר חֲנוֹךְ, Sefer Ḥanokh; መጽሐፈ ሄኖክ, Mäṣḥafä Hēnok)
- Another set of apocryphal writings:
  - The Testament of Abraham
  - The Testament of Isaac
  - The Testament of Jacob
  - The Testament of Moses
  - The Testament of Aaron (Note: The "Testament of Moses" (Gadla Musé) and the "Testament of Aaron" (Gadla Aron) are also known as the "Death of Moses" (Motá Musé) and the "Death of Aaron" (Motá Aron).)
  - The book of Disciples (אַרְדְּעֵת, Ardeʾet; አርደእት, ʾArdeʾet)
  - The apocalypse of Gorgorios (גורגוריוֹס, Gorgoryos; ጎርጎርዮስ)
  - The apocalypse of Baruch (בָּרוּךְ, Barukh; ባሮክ, Barok)
  - The book of Hours (סֵפֶר הַשָּׁעוֹת, Sefer ha‑Shaʿot; መጽሐፈ ሰዓታት, Mäṣḥafä Saʿatat)
  - The book of Philosophers (פִּילוֹסוֹפִים, Philosofim; ፋላስፋ, Fālasfā)
  - the book of Father Elijah (אַבָּא אֵלִיָּהוּ, Abba Eliyahu; አባ ኤልያስ, ʾAbba Eliyas)
  - the book of the Angels (סֵפֶר הַמַּלְאָכִים, Sefer ha‑Malʾakhim; መጽሐፈ መላእክት, Mäṣḥafä Mälaʾəkt)
  - The Homily on Abraham and Sarah in Egypt (ድርሳነ አብርሃም ወሣራ በግብፅ, Dərsanä Abrəham wä‑Sara bä‑Gəbs)
  - The Story of Susanna (אַגָּדָה שׁוֹשַׁנָּה, Aggadah Shoshanah; ገድላ ሶስና, Gadla Sosna)
  - A text entitled In the Beginning, God Created (בְּרֵאשִׁית בָּרָא אֱלֹהִים, Bereshit bara Elokim; በቀዳሚ ገብረ እግዚአብሔር, Baqadāmi Gabra ʾEgziʾabḥē)

Ethiopian Jews lacked access to the Talmud or other post-biblical Rabbinic texts (e.g., the Midrash) and therefore traditionally observed a Judaism based solely on the Tanakhic and apocryphal texts listed above.

== Prayer house ==
The synagogue or prayer house is called a mäsgid, or ṣalot bet. It can also be called a mäqdäs 'temple'. In Ethiopia, a prayer house was either a simple structure with windows facing the cardinal directions or an elaborate structure with separate prayer areas for men, women, and debteras surrounding the priests and the holy books, much like a bima, referred to as the Holy of Holies. The exit was to the east and featured a sacrificial altar for animal sacrifices as in the Temple in Jerusalem. Neither the altar nor animal sacrifice are features of Haymanot Judaism today.

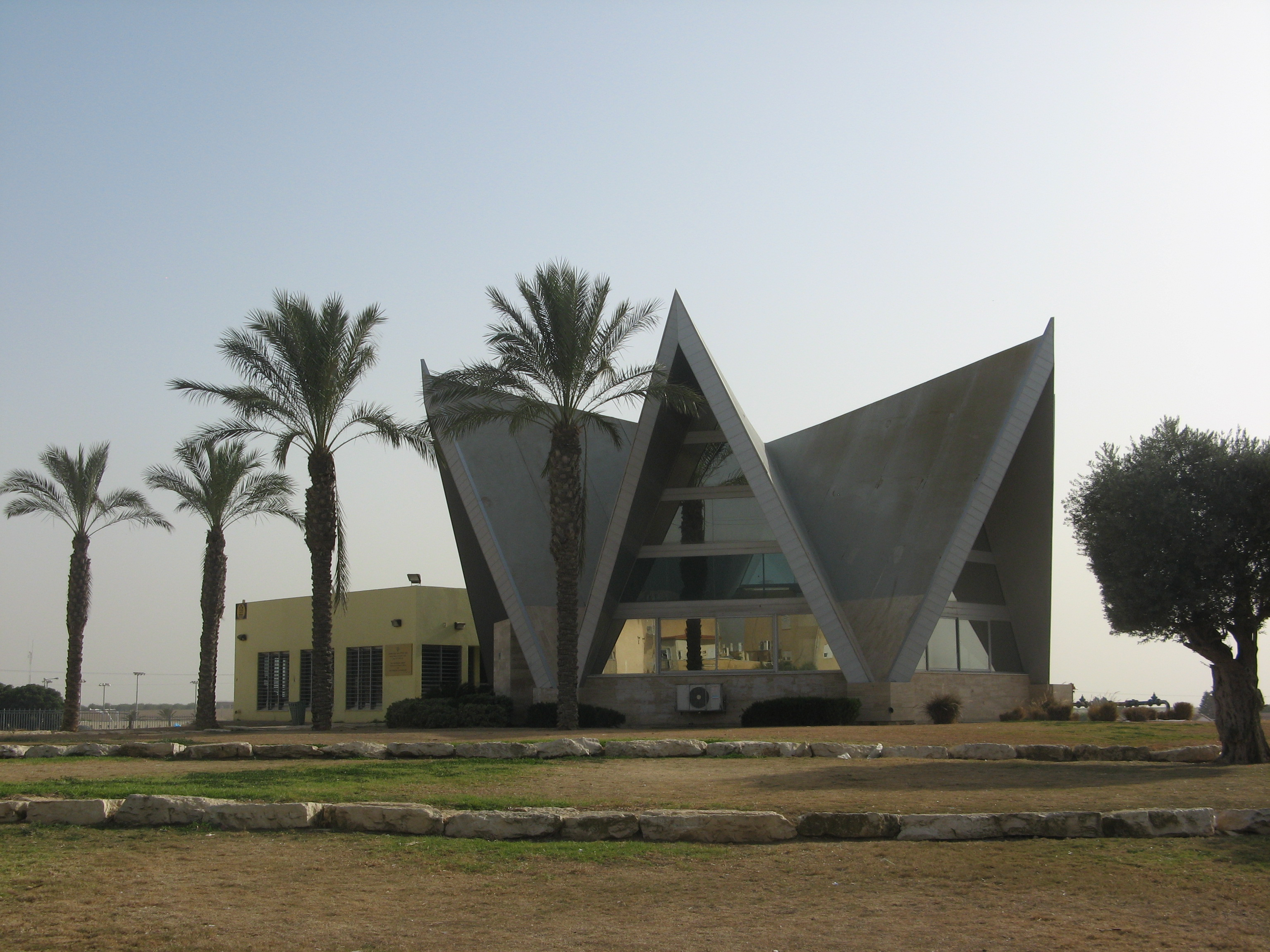
Modern synagogue, Netivot, Southern District of Israel

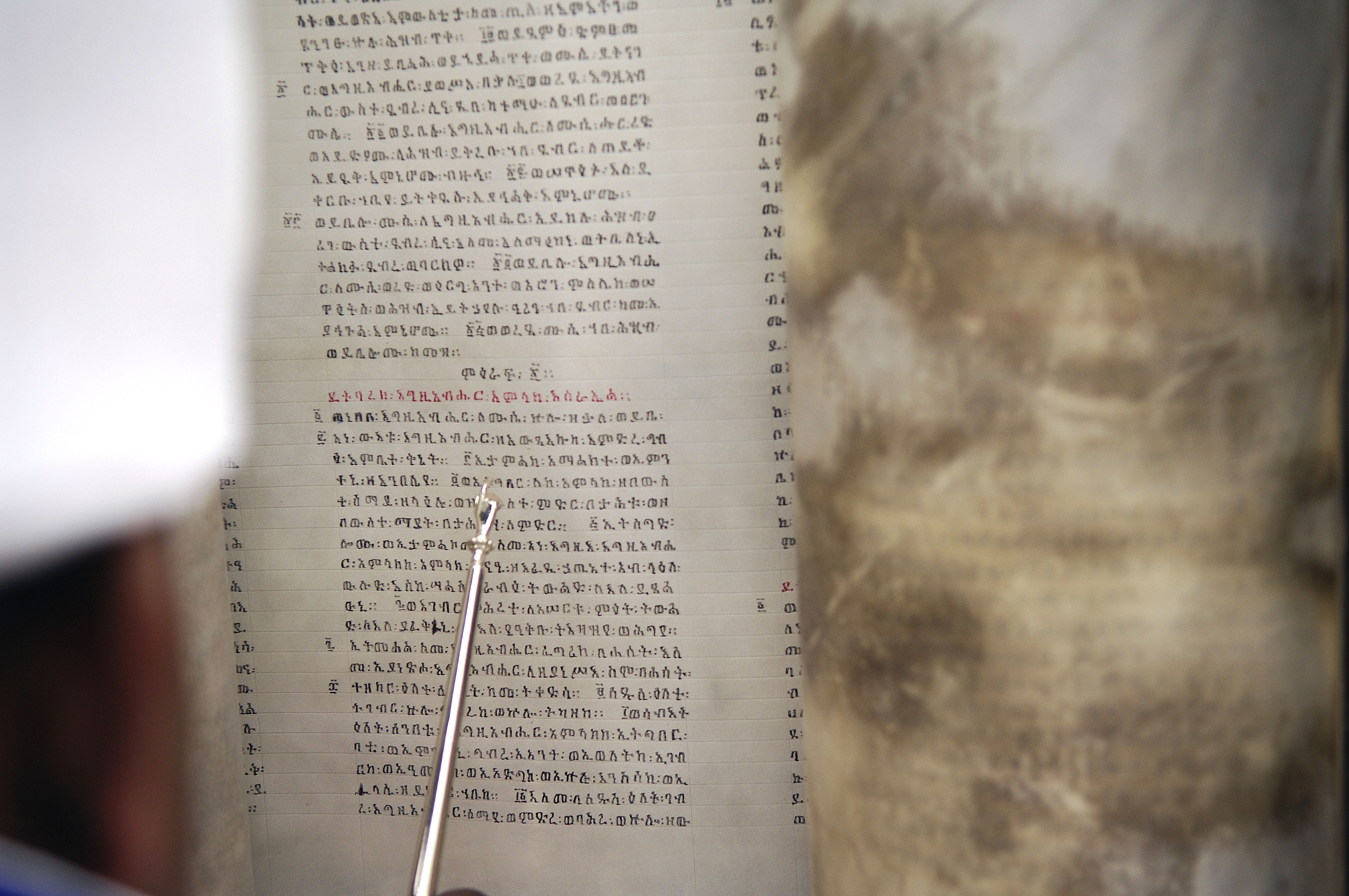
A kahen reading from the Orit

== Dietary laws ==
Kashrut for the Betä Israel is based mainly on Leviticus, Deuteronomy and Jubilees. Permitted and forbidden animals and their signs appear in Leviticus 11:3–11:8 and Deuteronomy 14:4–14:8.

- Forbidden birds are listed at Leviticus 11:13–11:23 and Deuteronomy 14:12–14:20.
- Definitions of permitted fish are in Leviticus 11:9–11:12 and Deuteronomy 14:9–14:10.
- Insects and larvae are forbidden according to Leviticus 11:41–11:42; exceptions are locusts, katydids, crickets, and grasshoppers, as noted in Leviticus 11:22-3.
- Birds of prey are forbidden according to Leviticus 11:13–11:19.
- Gid hanasheh is forbidden in Genesis 32:33.
- Mixtures of milk and meat are not prepared or eaten, but are not banned either: Haymanot interpreted the verses Exodus 23:19, Exodus 34:26, and Deuteronomy 14:21 literally, as in Karaite Judaism. Currently, under Rabbinic authority, mixing dairy products with meat is prohibited.

Believers were forbidden to eat the food of non-Jews. A qes eats only meat he personally ritually slaughtered, which his hosts then prepare for him and themselves.

Those who violated these taboos were ostracized and required purification. Purification included fasting for one or more days, eating only uncooked chickpeas provided by a qes, and ritual purification before entering the village. Unlike other Ethiopians, the Beta Israel do not eat raw meat dishes like kitfo or gored gored.

== Calendar and holidays ==
The calendar is a lunar calendar with 12 months, each containing 29 or 30 days. Every four years, there is a leap year, which adds a full month (30 days) to the Jewish year. The calendar combines the ancient calendars of Alexandrian Jewry, the Book of Jubilees, the Book of Enoch, Abu Shaker's Chronology, and the Geʽez calendar. The years are counted according to the Counting of Kushta: "1571 to Jesus Christ, 7071 to the Gyptians and 6642 to the Hebrews".

Jewish holidays by months:

- Nisan: baʿāl lisan ('head of Nisan', or New Year) on 1, ṣomä fāsikā ('Passover fast', the Fast of the Firstborn) on 14, fāsikā (Passover) 15–21, and gadfat ('grow fat') or buho ('fermented dough') on 22.
- Iyar: another fāsikā (Pesach Sheni) during 15–21.
- Sivan: ṣomä mäʾrar ('harvest fast') on 11 and mäʾrar ('harvest', or Shavuot) on 12.
- Tammuz: ṣomä tomos ('Tammuz fast') during 1–10.
- Av: ṣomä ab ('Av fast') during 1–17.
- Shavuot: the fourth Shabbat of the fifth month.
- Elul: awd amet ('year rotate') on 1, ṣomä lul ('Elul fast') during 1–9, anākel astar'i ('our atonement') on 10, and asartu wasamantu ('eighteenth') on 28.
- Tishrei: ba'āl Matqe ('blowing holiday', or Rosh Hashanah) on 1, astasreyo ('day of atonement', or Yom Kippur) on 10, and ba'āla maṣallat ('festival of booths', or Sukkot) during 15–21.
- Cheshvan: a holiday for the day Moses saw the face of God on 1; a holiday for the reception of Moses by the Israelites on 10; a fast on 12; and mehlella ('supplication', or Sigd) on 29.
- Kislev: another ṣomä mã'rar and mã'rar on 11 and 12, respectively.
- Tevet: ṣomä tibt ('Tevet fast') during 1–10.
- Shevat: wamashi brobu on 1.
- Adar: ṣomä astēr (Fast of Esther) during 11–13.

Monthly holidays are mainly memorial days to a given annual holiday:

- Yačaraqā ba'āl ('Rosh Chodesh'), on the first day of every month
- Asärt ('ten') on the tenth day to commemorate Yom Kippur
- Asrä hulat ('twelve') on the twelfth day to commemorate Shavuot
- Asrä ammest ('fifteen') on the fifteenth day to commemorate Passover and Sukkot
- Somä mälěya: a fast on the last day of every month.

Weekly holidays include the ṣomä säňňo (Monday fast), ṣomä amus (Thursday fast), ṣomä ʿarb (Friday fast), and Sanbat (Shabbat).

== Monasticism ==
The Beta Israel are the only extant Jewish group with a monastic tradition, albeit a historic one. The monks, bearing the title abba (አባ), lived separated from the Jewish villages to live in monasteries. However, only some Ethiopian Jews were monastics, and abba was also used to refer to community elders. The monastic tradition went extinct in the mid-20th century.

== See also ==
- Karaite Judaism, a denomination of Judaism that bears similarities to Haymanot
- Sadducees, Second Temple sect now extinct, also bears similarities to Haymanot
