= Koiak =

- Native name: Coptic: Ⲕⲟⲓⲁⲕ
- Calendar: Coptic calendar
- Month number: 4
- Number of days: 30
- Gregorian equivalent: December–January

Koiak (/ˈkɔːjæk/; Coptic: Ⲕⲟⲓⲁⲕ, [ˈkɔjak]), also known as Choiak (Ancient Greek: Χοιάκ, Khoiák) and Kiyahk (Coptic: Ⲕⲓⲁϩⲕ, Kiahk, [ˈkijahk]; Arabic: كياك or كيهك), is the fourth month of the ancient Egyptian and Coptic calendars. It lasts between 10 December and 8 January of the Gregorian calendar, or between 11 December and 9 January of the Gregorian calendar in Coptic calendar years immediately following a Coptic calendar leap year (which occur every four years, in Coptic calendar years immediately preceding those that are divisible by 4 to produce an integer; i.e., 1719, 1723, 1727, 1731, etc. are all examples of leap years in the Coptic calendar).

The month of Koiak is also the fourth month of the Season of Akhet (Inundation) in Ancient Egypt, when the Nile floods historically covered the land. They have not done so since the construction of the High Dam at Aswan.

== Name ==
The name of the month of Koiak comes from the Egyptian phrase kꜣ ḥr kꜣ "Soul upon Soul", a name of the sacred ancient Egyptian Apis Bull. It is attested in cuneiform with the pronunciation 𒆪𒄿𒄴𒆪 ku-i-iḫ-ku, likely representing /kɔʔ-iḥ-kɔʔ/ with an o-vowel as in later Coptic. It is also attested in Imperial Aramaic in the letters of Ananiah in the Jewish colony of Elephantine, Egypt as כיחך kyḥk.

== Coptic tradition ==
The month of Koiak holds a special place in the rite of the Coptic Orthodox Church. It is known as the "Mariam Month" ("Month of Mary") because the Nativity according to the Coptic calendar falls on 29 Koiak. The month is characterized by midnight praises that commemorate the Lord's Incarnation and venerate his mother, the Virgin Mary. The name of the Koiak midnight praise translates into Seven and Four, describing the outline of the praise that consists of 4 Canticles and 7 Theotokias (glorifications of Saint Mary).

It was at the beginning of the month of Koiak in Coptic calendar year 1726 that the Virgin Mary was said to have appeared in churches all over Egypt.

The liturgies and other services are held in the Kiahky tune. Notable seasonal hymns include "O Mary" and "Efemepsha Ghar."

== Coptic Synaxarium of the month of Koiak ==
Coptic	Julian	Gregorian	Commemorations
Koiak 1	November 27	December 10	Departure of Peter of Raha (Edessa), Bishop of Gaza; Consecration of the Church of Shenoute at the White Monastery
Koiak 2	November 28	December 11	Departure of Saint Hor the Monk; Commemoration of St. Hermina the Anchorite; Martyrdom of the church of St. Peter & St. Paul
Koiak 3	November 29	December 12	Entrance of St. Mary into the Temple at Jerusalem.; Martyrdom of St. Salib
Koiak 4	November 30	December 13	Martyrdom of Andrew the Apostle, the Brother of Saint Peter.
Koiak 5	December 1	December 14	Departure of Nahum, the Prophet.; Martyrdom of St. Victor (Boctor) of Asyut; Martyrdom of St. Isidore (Isidorus)
Koiak 6	December 2	December 15	Martyrdom of St. Anatolius (Anatole); Martyrdom of St. Batalus
Koiak 7	December 3	December 16	Martyrdom of St. Banina & St. Banau; Departure of St. Abraham, the 62nd Pope of Alexandria.; Departure of St. Matthew the Poor.; Enthronement of St. John XIX, the 113th Pope of Alexandria.
Koiak 8	December 4	December 17	Martyrdom of St. Barbara & St. Juliana; Martyrdom of the St. Paisus (Isi) & His Sister St. Thecla; Departure of St. Heraclas (Theoclas), the 13th Pope of Alexandria.; Departure of St. Samuel the Confessor, Abbot of El-Qualamon Monastery.; Departure of Yostos El Antony, the Silent Monk.
Koiak 9	December 5	December 18	Departure of St. Poemen, the Confessor
Koiak 10	December 6	December 19	Martyrdom of St. Shura of Shinshif; Departure of St. Theophilus II, the 60th Pope of Alexandria.; Relocation of the Body of St. Severus, Patriarch of Antioch.; Departure of Saint Nicholas, the Confessor, Bishop of Myra.
Koiak 11	December 7	December 20	Departure of the St. Pijimi.; Martyrdom of St. Abtelmaos (Ptolemy), a Native of Denderah.; The Commemoration of the Consecration of the Church of St. Claudius the Soldier, in the city of Baqour, district of Abu-Tig.
Koiak 12	December 8	December 21	Commemoration of Michael, the Archangel.; Commemoration of St. John the Confessor; Departure of St. Hedra, Bishop of Aswan; Assembly of the Council at Rome in 249 AD. Against Benates (Novatus) the Priest; Departure of St. Mark VIII, the 108th Pope of Alexandria.
Koiak 13	December 9	December 22	Commemoration of the Honourable Archangel Raphael.; Martyrdom of St. Barsanuphius; Departure of St. Apraxios (Abracius).; Consecration of the Church of St. Misael, the Anchorite.; Departure of St Elias the Anchorite.; St. Zali, disciple of St. Matthew
Koiak 14	December 10	December 23	Martyrdom of St. Ammonius, Bishop of Esna; Martyrdom of St. Behnam & His Sister St. Sarah; Martyrdom of Sts. Simeon of Menouf, Abba Hor, and Abba Mina the Elder; Departure of St. Christodolos, the 66th Pope of Alexandria.
Koiak 15	December 11	December 24	Martyrdom of St. Asbah; Martyrdom of St. Amsah al-Qifti; Departure of St. Gregory the Illuminator, the Patriarch of Armenia.; Departure of St. Lucas the Stylite.; Departure of the Saint Abba Ezekiel, a native of Armunt.
Koiak 16	December 12	December 25	Departure of the Righteous Gideon, One of the Judges of Israel.; Martyrdom of Sts. Harouadi, Ananias & Khouzi of Akhmim; Martyrdom of St. Eulogius & St. Arsenius; Consecration of the Church of St. James the Persian
Koiak 17	December 13	December 26	Departure of St. Luke the Stylite and the Relocation of His Holy Relics; Commemoration of St. Elisa the Anchorite
Koiak 18	December 14	December 27	Commemoration of the Relocation of the Relics of St. Titus to Constantinople.; Commemoration of St. Heracleas the Martyr and St. Philemon the Priest
Koiak 19	December 15	December 28	Departure of St. John, Bishop of El-Borollos, who gathered the Biographies of the Saints (The Synaxarion)
Koiak 20	December 16	December 29	Departure of Haggai, the Prophet.; Commemoration of St. Elias, Bishop of al-Muharraq
Koiak 21	December 17	December 30	Commemoration of the Holy Virgin Saint Mary, the Mother of God (Theotokos).; Martyrdom of St. Barnabas, one of the Seventy Apostles.
Koiak 22	December 18	December 31	Commemoration of Gabriel, the Archangel.; Departure of St. Anastasius, the 36th Pope of Alexandria
Koiak 23	December 19	January 1	Departure of David, the Prophet and King; Departure of St. Timothy, the Anchorite
Koiak 24	December 20	January 2	Martyrdom of St. Ignatius, Patriarch of Antioch.; Departure of St. Philogonius, Patriarch of Antioch; Commemoration of the Nativity of St. Takla Haymanot, the Ethiopian.
Koiak 25	December 21	January 3	Departure of St. John Kama (Khame)
Koiak 26	December 22	January 4	Martyrdom of St. Anastasia.; Commemoration of St. Juliana the Martyr.
Koiak 27	December 23	January 5	Martyrdom of St. Psote, the Bishop of Ebsay
Koiak 28	December 24	January 6	The Glorious Nativity of Our Lord Jesus Christ (Christmas).; Martyrdom of 150 Men and 24 Women from Ansena
Koiak 29	December 25	January 7	Feast of the Nativity of Our Lord Jesus Christ (Christmas).
Koiak 30	December 26	January 8	The Adoration of the Magi.; Departure of St. John, Archpriest of Scetis

== Rituals ==
During the month of Koiak, many rituals and festivals are performed in Egypt to celebrate Osiris, Isis, and Nephthys. These rites have been prominent as early as the New Kingdom. Two women will take the roles of the goddesses, Isis and Nephthys, to mourn for their dead brother Osiris. The main festival was over a length of ten days, ending at the day of Osiris's resurrection. This day also marked the beginning of the new agricultural season, when the Egyptians began to plant new crops for the year. Each day of the festival also featured a scene of purifications, feasts, and constructions of memorials associated with Osiris's resurrection.

== See also ==
- Egyptian, Coptic, and Islamic calendars
