= Misael the Anchorite =

Christian monk

Saint Misael the Anchorite

The Anchorite The Holy Monk
- Born: 7th century (Note: Based on his youth in Anba Isaac's narrative, and the consecration of the church at the end of the narrative in Coptic Year 396, corresponding to the Latin year 680); Egypt
- Venerated in: Coptic Orthodox Church, Oriental Orthodoxy,
- Major shrine: Monastery of Saint Samuel the Confessor, Mount Qalamoun, Egypt
- Feast: Month of Koiak 13 Coptic Church

Misael the Anchorite was a Christian monk who is venerated by the Coptic Orthodox Church.

== Biography ==
Much of Misael's story is recorded by Anba Isaac, the abbot of the St. Samuel monastery. Misael is known to have had parents who were not religious or heavily involved with the church. His parents also struggled to have a child. It is said that an old monk gave commands to the father to return to the church and to strengthen the family's foundation with the Christian faith so that they could have a child. According to the testimony of Misael to the abbot of St. Samuel monastery, it was after his father had done all that the elder monk had commanded that his mother gave birth to him.

Misael was accepted into the Monastery of Saint Samuel the Confessor by the abbot and was accordingly dressed with the garb of the monastic life and the eskeem. From there on, he lived a solitary life in worship and asceticism.

Misael is also said to have prophesied about three main events which took place. The first of which concerned an incoming famine; in response to hearing about this, the abbot of the monastery was able to purchase a plentiful supply of grain in preparation. The second prophesy concerned him being taken away from the monastery by a soldier. The third prophesy regarded Misael's own death: he informed the abbot of the monastery, Abba Isaac, that he would die the following year. After that, Isaac reports that Misael "departed and I did not see him again".

== Feast day and commemoration ==
The consecration day of the church of St. Misael was on the 10th of Bashens in the Coptic Year 396, during the reign of Decledianus. The Coptic Orthodox Church celebrates the feast of St. Misael on the 13th of the Month of Koiak.

== See also ==
- Bishop Missael of Birmingham
