= Apocalypse of Samuel of Kalamoun =

Medieval Coptic text against Arabization

The Apocalypse of Samuel of Kalamoun is a Coptic text ascribed to the Coptic saint Samuel the Confessor, also known as Samuel of Kalamoun, who lived in the seventh century. It contains the strongest denunciation of the language shift in the Middle Ages of Egypt, in which the country's Coptic language was slowly replaced by Arabic. It records that the Christians in Egypt were becoming increasingly Arabized in culture and customs. Actual conversion to Islam does not seem to be a concern for the author. In reality, the arabization of Lower Egypt preceded that of Middle and Upper Egypt, as suggested by Ibn Hawqal in the late 10th century.

The text was produced in the Monastery of Saint Samuel the Confessor. It claims to be the transcript of the monk Apollo of the words of the monastery's founder, Samuel the Confessor. While it has been dated to the 8th century, the actual date of the text depends on the interpretation of the list of "predicted" Arab kings that it contains. These seem to refer to the Fatimid caliphs, and the work may therefore be dated to the period between the 10th and the 12th century.

The work is a prophecy of Samuel the Confessor of how Egyptians will abandon their native Coptic language and adopt the language of the colonizers, Arabic. The text criticizes the adoption of the Church's adoption of Arabic at length, not only for the introduction of Muslim theological terms into Christian theology, but also for enabling other forms of assimilation. Examples of such assimilation was the increasingly more common choice of Arabic names by Christians, leading to the abandonment of saints' names and the protection they were thought to offer. The adoption of Arabic was also seen as encouraging Copts to imitate Muslim ways and to abandon their traditional practices, such as Christians taking several wives or concubines, and adopting the eating and drinking habits of Muslims this neglecting the Christian periods of fast.

An excerpt of the text, translated by Ziadeh, reads as follows

Woe upon woe!! What shall I say, my children, about those times and about the great idleness that will overtake the Christians? At that time they will move away from uprightness and start to assimilate themselves to the Hagarenes in their actions: they will give their names to their children, discarding the names of the angels, the prophets, the apostles, and the martyrs. They will also do something else, which if I were to tell you of it, would greatly pain your hearts: they will abandon the beautiful Coptic language, in which the Holy Spirit has often spoken through the mouths of our spiritual fathers; they will teach their children from an early age to speak the language of the Bedouin, and will take pride in it. Even the priests and the monks - they too! - will dare to speak in Arabic and to take pride in it, and that within the sanctuary.

Woe upon woe!! Oh, my dear children! What shall I say? At that time the readers in the church will no longer understand what they read nor what they say because they will have forgotten their language, and they will truly be miserable and deserving to be wept over because they will have forgotten their language and will speak the language of the Hagarenes. But woe to every Christian who teaches his son the language of the Hagarenes from an early age, causing him to forget the language of his fathers! [...] Many books of the Church shall fall into disuse, because there shall be nobody among them to take care of the books, their hearts being attracted by the Arabic books. They will forget many martyrs at that time because their biographies will fall into disuse and there will be none left. If the few biographies that will be found are read, many people will not understand what is read because they will not know the language. And many churches, at that time, will fall into ruin, and they shall be deserted on the eves of the feasts and on the eve of Sunday, too.

== See also ==
- Samuel the Confessor
- Monastery of Saint Samuel the Confessor
- Coptic language
- Coptic identity
- Arabization
