= Testaments of the Three Patriarchs =

The Testaments of the Three Patriarchs is another name for the collection formed by the following three apocryphal works of the Hebrew Scriptures:

- Testament of Abraham
- Testament of Isaac
- Testament of Jacob

These are generally considered important to the Abrahamic faiths of Christianity, Judaism, and Islam. The Greek texts were published together as a scholarly collection by M. R. James in 1892.
