= Yostos El Antony =

Egyptian monk (1902–1976)

Saint Yustos El Antony
- Born: 1910; Zarabie El-Muharraq, Khedivate of Egypt
- Died: 1976 (aged 65–66); Monastery of St. Anthony, Egypt
- Venerated in: Coptic Orthodox Church
- Major shrine: Monastery of St. Anthony
- Feast: 8 Kiahk

Saint Yostos El Antony, Yustos El Anthony, or Abouna Yustos or The Silent Monk Arabic: يسطس الانطونى (1910 – 1976) was a Christian monk from Egypt.

== Hagiography ==
St Yustos was born in Zarabie El-Muharraq. His father named him Nagyib. His father was a tailor, and this was the trade in which Naguib was trained in his early years. He left his father, mother and brother around the age of 30 and went to the Monastery of Saint Paul the Anchorite. There, he lived and worked for about 2 years but was not permitted to become a monk. As he rang the bell for prayer one day, the rope broke and after this he was required to leave this monastery.

He travelled to the nearby Monastery of Saint Anthony in November 1941 where the head of the monastery accepted him. After some years Naguib received the veil of a monk. Subsequently, he became known for his saintly life, silence and asceticism. In particular, he was known for frequently asking, "What time is it?" to remind people to be careful about every deed as this life is short and "people must give an account to God for it."

Pope Shenouda III of Alexandria said of Saint Yustos that "he is the living example of the 4th century monks".

== Veneration ==
The feast day of St Yustos is celebrated on 8 Kiahk according to the Coptic calendar used by the Coptic Church. Throughout the 20th century, this corresponded to 4 December of the Julian calendar and 17 December of the Gregorian calendar or the day after on both if the previous year of the Coptic calendar was a leap year.
