= Pascha (Coptic Church) =

Coptic Orthodox Holy Week service

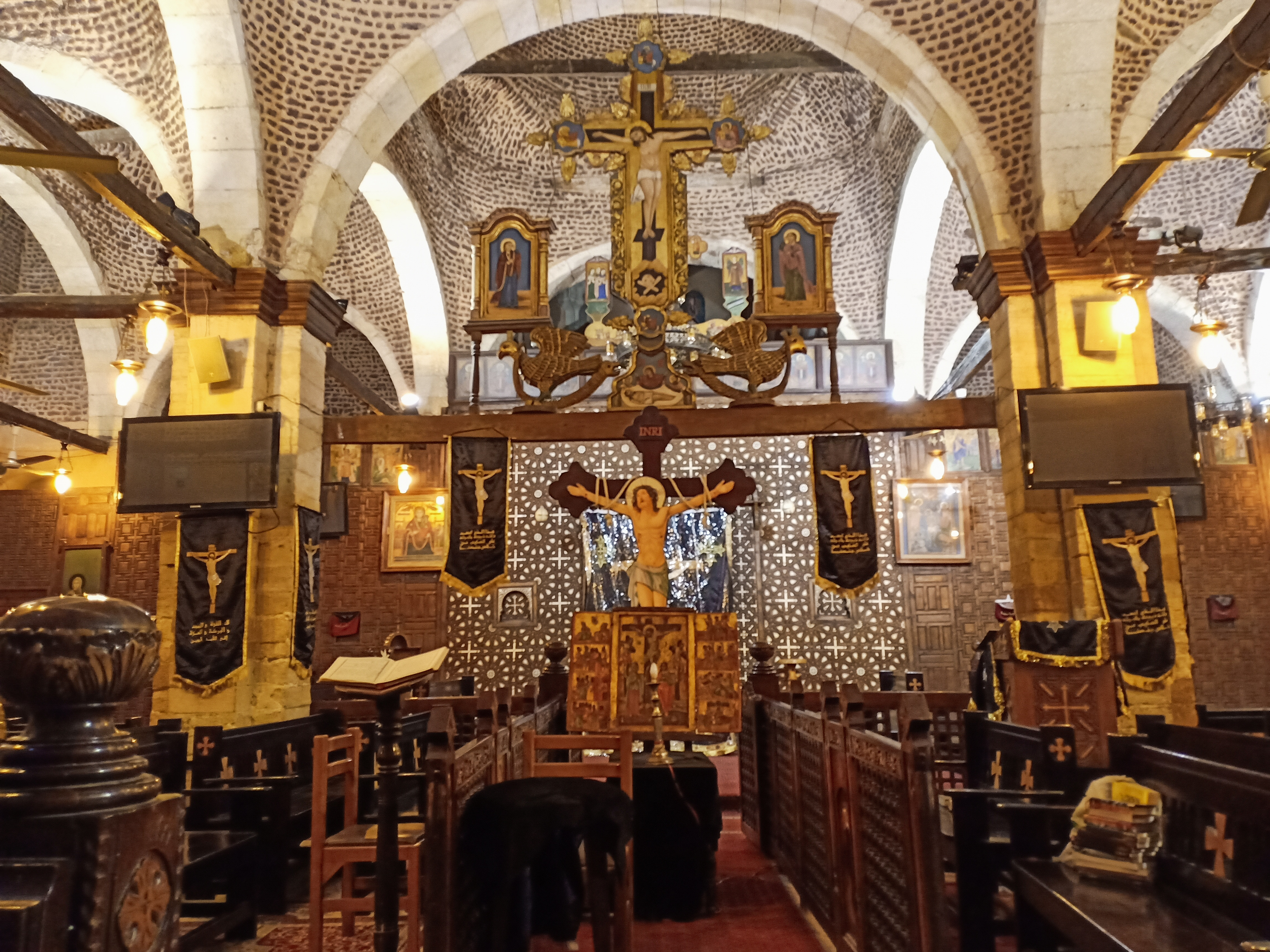
The Church of Saint Mary in Haret Elroum on Good Friday

In the Coptic Orthodox Church, Pascha (Coptic: ⲡⲁⲥⲭⲁ, Arabic: البصخة) refers to both the services held on Holy Week and the week itself, which commemorates the Passion and Crucifixion of Jesus Christ. The Holy Pascha is the only time of the year when no liturgies are prayed (except on Sunday, Thursday and Saturday), and the Agpeya is not prayed. Instead, a Pascha is prayed every morning and evening. Moreover, the usually red altar veil is replaced with a black one, and black banners are hung around the church. Pascha services are always held in the nave of the church. and typically last 2–3 hours.

== Etymology ==
The Coptic word ⲡⲁⲥⲭⲁ is loaned from the Greek πάσχα, which in Modern Greek means Easter, but before Christianity referred to the Jewish Passover. The word πάσχα is itself loaned through Aramaic from the Hebrew פֶּסַח (Pesah), meaning "to pass over", because the Angel of Death "passed over" the houses of the Israelites. The reason the name of the Jewish Passover was transferred to the Christian Holy Week is that Christians see Jesus as the fulfillment of the Passover lamb.

== Structure ==
Beginning on Palm Sunday, a Pascha is prayed every morning and evening until Easter. Each Pascha is divided into 5 "hours": the 1st, 3rd, 6th, 9th and 11th hours. On Good Friday, an additional 12th hour is added.

The majority of the Pascha consists of readings. Each hour follows this structure:

- Prophecies from the Old Testament
- In some hours, a homily from one of the Church Fathers
- The Paschal praise (Thok te ti gom) is chanted antiphonally twelve times (Note: In Coptic, its words are as follows: Ⲑⲱⲕ ⲧⲉ ϯϫⲟⲙ ⲛⲉⲙ ⲡⲓⲱ̀ⲟⲩ ⲛⲉⲙ ⲡⲓⲥ̀ⲙⲟⲩ ⲛⲉⲙ ⲡⲓⲁ̀ⲙⲁϩⲓ ϣⲁ ⲉ̀ⲛⲉϩ ⲁ̀ⲙⲏⲛ: Ⲉⲙⲙⲁⲛⲟⲩⲏⲗ ⲡⲉⲛⲛⲟⲩϯ ⲡⲉⲛⲟⲩⲣⲟ. Ⲑⲱⲕ ⲧⲉ ϯϫⲟⲙ ⲛⲉⲙ ⲡⲓⲱ̀ⲟⲩ ⲛⲉⲙ ⲡⲓⲥ̀ⲙⲟⲩ ⲛⲉⲙ ⲡⲓⲁ̀ⲙⲁϩⲓ ϣⲁ ⲉ̀ⲛⲉϩ ⲁ̀ⲙⲏⲛ: Ⲡⲁⲟ̅ⲥ̅ Ⲓⲏ̅ⲥ̅ Ⲡⲭ̅ⲥ̅: (ⲡⲁⲤⲱⲧⲏⲣ ⲛ̀ⲁ̀ⲅⲁⲑⲟⲥ:) (ⲧⲁϫⲟⲙ ⲛⲉⲙ ⲡⲁⲥ̀ⲙⲟⲩ ⲡⲉ Ⲡⲟ̅ⲥ̅: ⲁϥϣⲱⲡⲓ ⲛⲏⲓ ⲉⲩⲥⲱⲧⲏⲣⲓⲁ̀ ⲉϥⲟⲩⲁⲃ.) Ⲑⲱⲕ ⲧⲉ ϯϫⲟⲙ ⲛⲉⲙ ⲡⲓⲱ̀ⲟⲩ ⲛⲉⲙ ⲡⲓⲥ̀ⲙⲟⲩ ⲛⲉⲙ ⲡⲓⲁ̀ⲙⲁϩⲓ ϣⲁ ⲉ̀ⲛⲉϩ ⲁ̀ⲙⲏⲛ. Below is an English translation: Thine is the power, the glory, the blessing, and the majesty, forever Amen. Emmanuel our God and our King. Thine is the power, the glory, the blessing, and the majesty, forever Amen. O my Lord Jesus Christ, (my good Savior.) (The Lord is my strength, my praise, and has become my holy salvation.) Thine is the power, the glory, the blessing, and the majesty, forever Amen.)
- A few verses from the Psalms are read in a slow, melancholy tune (Note: The usual tune is called the "Adribi" tune, because it was developed by monks of the White Monastery near Athribis. Two psalms, "Pek ethronos" and "Avechinon", are instead read in the "Shami" tune, named after the village of Ash Shamiyya in Egypt.)
- The introduction to the Gospel is read or, occasionally, slowly chanted (Note: The Gospel introduction, as well as many of the readings themselves, are shared with the Byzantine Rite. Its Greek text is as follows: Καὶ ὑπέρ τοῦ καταξιωθῆναι ἡµᾶς τῆς ἀκροάσεως τοῦ ἁγίου Εὐαγγελίου, Κύριον τὸν Θεὸν ἡµῶν ἱκετεύσωµεν. Σοφία! Ὀρθοί! Ἀκούσωµεν τοῦ ἁγίου Εὐαγγελίου. Below is an English translation: Let us pray to the Lord our God that we may be made worthy to hear the holy Gospel. Wisdom! Arise! Let us hear the holy Gospel.)
- A passage from one of the Gospels is read
- The exposition

After all the hours, some litanies are prayed, followed by twelve "Kyrie Eleison"s and a concluding hymn.

== Days ==
=== Palm Sunday ===
Palm Sunday commemorates the entry of Christ into Jerusalem. During Matins of the Palm Sunday liturgy, a procession is made around the church, stopping at 12 stations. At each station, a gospel is read. After the liturgy, a general funeral is prayed over the entire congregation, in case one of them dies within the next week, because funeral services are not prayed during the Paschal Week.

Following an old Jewish system in which days begin at sunset, the Monday Eve Pascha is prayed on the evening of Palm Sunday, followed by the Monday Day Pascha the following morning, followed by the Tuesday Eve Pascha and so on.

=== Monday and Tuesday ===
On Monday of the Holy Pascha, the Gospel readings recount Jesus' cursing of the fig tree and cleansing of the Temple. Then on Tuesday, (Note: As detailed in Matthew 21:18–26:2, Mark 11:20–13:37 and Luke 20:1–21:38) the Pharisees questioned Jesus' authority, and he taught several parables in the Temple before withdrawing with his disciples to the Mount of Olives and giving them the Olivet Discourse.

Beginning from the 11th hour of Tuesday, in which Jesus predicts his death, the phrase "my good Savior" is added to the Paschal praise.

=== Holy Wednesday ===
On Wednesday, the readings contrast the anointing of Jesus by the sinful woman with his betrayal by Judas Iscariot. Notably, the "apostolic greeting," or the holy kiss, is not practiced from this day, until Bright Saturday or The Resurrection.

=== Holy Thursday ===
A unique liturgy is held on Thursday of the Holy Pascha (also called Covenant Thursday) to commemorate Jesus instituting the Eucharist at the Last Supper. During this liturgy, after the Praxis reading from Acts 1:15–20, the deacons make a procession backwards (i.e. clockwise) around the church and chant "Ἰούδας, Ἰούδας ο Παράνομος" (Judas, Judas the law-breaker). Later in the liturgy, there is a Lakkan (Arabic: لقان), or Liturgy of the Waters, because Jesus washed his disciples' feet.

=== Good Friday ===
On the Pascha of Good Friday, "The Lord is my strength, my praise, and has become my holy salvation" is added to the Paschal praise. After the first hour, the icon of the Crucifixion is adorned with roses and lit candles. The priests wear dark robes, and the deacons wear their stoles with the blue side up to symbolise mourning. Four gospels are read each hour instead of one, and many hymns, such as Only-begotten Son and the Trisagion, are chanted in slow, mournful tunes.

In the first gospel of the sixth hour, when the deacon reads Matthew 27:45, the church's lights are turned off and all candles are blown out. Once the twelfth hour begins, the deacons move up to the chorus, the black altar curtain is opened, and the candles and lights are turned back on. The third chapter of the Book of Lamentations is read in its paschal tune. After the exposition and litanies, Kyrie Eleison is chanted 400 times, 100 in each direction, with full metanoias. An icon the Crucifixion is in a procession around the church, then the priest buries it in roses, spices and perfumes while the deacons chant the hymn "Golgotha". After these proceedings, the attending priests read from the Psalms, until Psalm 3, specifically, "I lay down and slept." The 150 psalms are then to be read.

=== Bright Saturday ===
On the night between Friday and Saturday, sometimes called Apocalypse Night, a service from around midnight to sunrise. Shortly before it, the black banners and altar veil are replaced by white ones. It begins by singing Psalm 151 (in Coptic, ⲁⲛⲟⲕ ⲡⲉ ⲡⲓⲕⲟϫⲓ,) followed by a Tasbeha and readings of many canticles from the Bible. After the Raising of Incense, the Verses of Cymbals, the Saturday Theotokia and several doxologies and litanies, a procession is held.

After this there is a Pascha, in which the psalm and gospel readings begin in the Paschal tune and switch halfway to the annual tune. Between the sixth and ninth hours, the entire Book of Revelation is read, interspersed by some responses, then the priest anoints the congregation with oil. Finally, a liturgy is prayed.
