= Tasbeha =

Coptic Orthodox praise preceding liturgy

Tasbeha (from the Arabic word "تسبحة" meaning "praise") is the Midnight Praise of the Coptic Orthodox Church. (Note: The term "Tasbeha" can refer to several different Coptic rites, such as the Morning Praise and Vespers Praise, but generally means the Midnight Praise.) The Praise consists of four canticles, known in the Coptic language as a "Hoos" (Coptic: ϩⲱⲥ), directly from the Holy Bible, as well as other praises that vary by day of the week. As its name suggests, the Tasbeha typically happens late at night, preceding a liturgy in the morning. In monasteries, the Tasbeha is usually prayed every night, often in the early hours before dawn. However, outside monasteries, this usually happens in the evening before a liturgy, though not necessarily at midnight. It typically lasts from 90 minutes to 2 hours.

== Structure ==
After praying the Agpeya, the Tasbeha begins with the hymn known as Ten Theno which calls on God to awaken us from our slumber so that we may praise Him fittingly. The Tasbeha then proceeds with 4 "Hoos"-es or canticles. Each canticle is sung directly from the Bible, followed by a "Lobsh" or explanation hymn.

1. The first canticle is the Song of Moses (Exodus 15:1–21).
2. The second canticle or hoos is Psalm 135 in the Septuagint (136 in the Masoretic), which thanks God for "His mercy [that] endures forever".
3. The third canticle is the praise of the Three Holy Children (Daniel 3:52–90) (Note: This Bible passage is one of the Deuterocanonical sections of Daniel, and is not included in many Protestant Bibles.) followed by its Lobsh hymn Aripsalin.
  - On Bright Saturday and during the month of Kiahk, the hymn Tenen is chanted.
4. After some additional hymns, doxologies, and commemorations of the saints, the fourth canticle is sung, which consists of the Laudate psalms (Psalms 148, 149, and 150).

The Tasbeha continues with Psali (from Greek "ψάλλω" meaning to sing psalms), which are praises for Jesus, and Theotokia, which are praises for St. Mary that intricately explore the various symbols of the Virgin and Christ's incarnation present in the Old Testament. The Psali and Theotokia depend on the day of the week. Luke 2:29-32 and an Antiphonary about the saint of the day are also read. It concludes with a praise of God for His mercy, the Creed, the prayer "Holy Holy Holy" and, if a priest is present, the Midnight Absolution.

=== Seven and Four ===
Traditionally, on every Saturday evening during the month of Kiahk (which overlaps with the Nativity Fast), a Tasbeha would held in which the four canticles and all seven Theotokia of the week would be chanted, interspersed by additional hymns and glorifications in honour of the Virgin Mary. These Tasbehas were thus called "Seven and Four", and would last all night until Sunday morning. However, it is more common nowadays for churches to have a daily "Seven and Four" Tasbeha throughout Kiahk, praying only that day's Theotokia on each one. This service typically lasts 5–7 hours, concluding around midnight.

== Symbolism ==
Tasbeha is often regarded by Copts as the closest time to Heaven on Earth in that the community joins with the angels in the heavenly praise of God.
