= Pijimi =

Coptic saint

Saint Pijimi

Hermit, Ascetic
- Born: 4th century Feesha, Egypt
- Died: 4th century Scetes, Egypt
- Venerated in: Coptic Orthodox Church
- Feast: 11 Koiak

Pijimi (Coptic: ⲡⲓϫⲓⲙⲓ) is a 4th-century Coptic saint, a native of Fisha (modern Beheira Governorate), diocese of Masil.

== Life ==
According to Coptic manuscripts, an angel appeared to Pijimi at the age of 12 and asked him to become a monk. Pijimi agreed and went to the desert of Scetes, where he dwelt with a number of monks for 24 years until they all departed.

Subsequently, Pijimi left that place and went into the inner desert, a distance of three days travel. Having overcome the devils' conspiracies against him, he lived in a valley inside the desert for three years, fasting a week at a time. At the end of each week, he would eat a handful of dates and drink some water. According to Coptic sources, he once fasted for 80 days, to the point that his skin cleaved to his bones.

Another story about Pijimi is that he went looking for Macarius with another hermit, who, when they found him, told them to quarry their own cells.

After years of living in the inner desert, Pijimi returned to his city of Feesha and built a small cell on its outskirts. He dwelt there alone, devoting himself to worshiping and asceticism. He became a good model and a good example for everyone who saw him, and people came to him to be nourished with his spiritual teachings.

Coptic sources say that Saint Shenouda the Archimandrite once saw an exceedingly shining pillar and heard a voice telling him "This is Abba Pijimi". Thus, Shenouda went to visit him for a number of days.

Following a short illness, Pijimi died at the age of 70 on 11 Koiak.

His feast day is 11 Kiahk.
