= Aprax =

Coptic anchorite and saint

- Occupation: saint

Aprax (also known as Abracius) is a saint of the Coptic Church.

He was a native of Upper Egypt and became an anchorite for 70 years.

His feast day is celebrated on December 9.

== Sources ==
- Holweck, F. G. A Biographical Dictionary of the Saints. St. Louis, Missouri, US: B. Herder Book Co. 1924.
