= Monastery of Saint Samuel the Confessor =

Monastery in Egypt

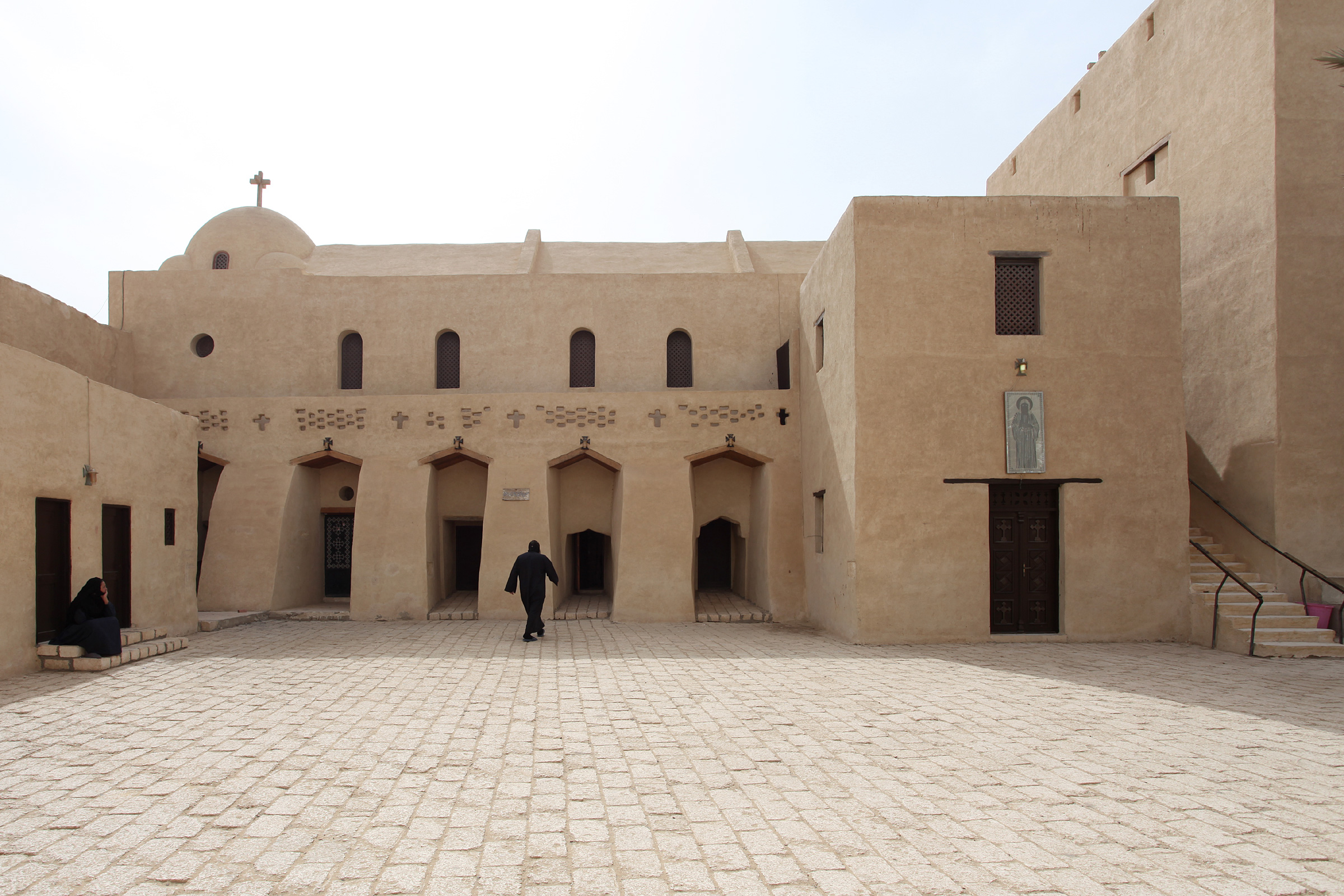
- North side of the Church of the Saint Misael, Monastery of Saint Samuel the Confessor

- Location within Egypt
- Interactive map of Monastery of Saint Samuel the Confessor

Monastery information
- Other name: Dair al-Qalamun
- Dedication: Saint Samuel the Confessor
- Diocese: Coptic Orthodox Church of Alexandria
- Controlled churches: Church of Holy Virgin, Church of the Saint Misael

Site
- Location: Beni Suef Governorate
- Country: Egypt
- Coordinates: 28.9086°N 30.5053°E
- Public access: Yes

Monastery of Saint Samuel the Confessor (Arabic: دير الأنبا صموئيل المعترف), Dair al-Anba Ṣamū'īl al-mu'tarif or Deir el-Qalamun (Arabic: دير القلمون) is an Egyptian monastery in the Western Desert.

== Location of the monastery ==
The Monastery of Saint Samuel the Confessor in Qalamun is located on the northern edge of the valley Wadi el-Muweiliḥ south of Wadi El Rayan in the western desert in the province of Beni Suef west of Gebel el- Qalamūn. The approximately 20 kilometer long valley formed part of the caravan route between Minya and Faiyum.

== Meaning of the name el-Qalamūn ==
El-Qalamūn (Coptic: Ⲕⲁⲗⲁⲙⲱⲛ, Kalamōn) is probably derived from the Greek word Κάλαμος, Kalamos. Behind it lies reeds, which were present in the marshy environment of the monastery. Slightly cut it can be used as a writing instrument. But it can also be used for the production of wicker.

== History of the monastery ==
The beginnings of the monastery date back to the end of the 3rd century or the beginning of the 4th century until the time of the Christian persecution under Emperor Diocletian. According to a Coptic manuscript about the martyrdom of Psote, at that time hermits were already living in the caves along the valley of Qalamūn. Later, probably in the 5th century, these hermits as Cenobites formed a monastic community. From the life story of Samuel the Confessor, who was written by his successor Isaak, can be seen that he came upon a deserted church and restored the church and the monk's cells. First income was obtained with the sale of basket-ware. The monastery experienced a considerable upswing. When Samuel died 695 at the age of 98 years, about 120 monks lived in the monastery.

The monastery was plundered several times by Bedouins during Samuel's lifetime, and also in the following centuries. In spite of difficult times, the monastery continued and at the turn of the 13th century flourished with 130 monks and twelve chapels, as reported by Abu Ṣaliḥ, the Armenian historian Abu el-Makarim. One of the churches was consecrated to the Blessed Virgin. The monastery was surrounded by a large wall with four defensive and residential towers and encompassed a large garden next to the chapels. A monk named Muhna lived in a cave of Gebel el-Qalamūn. Possibly the monastery was already in decline in the 14th century. In 1353 the relic of Saint Ischkirun was moved from el-Qalamun to the Monastery of St. Macarius in Wadi Natrun. Pope Gabriel V, the 88th patriarch and pope of Alexandria (1409-1427), came from this monastery. Until the report of the Arab historian al-Maqrizi (1364-1442), there are hardly any other sources. In his time the monastery was still inhabited. Al-Maqrizi mentioned two of the four towers and two sources. A rather unusual note on the monastery can be found in a treasure-digging book from the 15th century, the "Book of buried pearls and valuable secrets for hints of hiding places, finds and treasuries."

It is unknown when the monastery was abandoned, though it probably happened in the 17th century. The Italian adventurer Giovanni Battista Belzoni (1778-1823) was the first European in 1819 to visit the abandoned monastery and gave a description of the catacombs church, today's crypt. He visited the monastery on his return from Siwa via al-Baḥriya to Faiyum. The representations, such as the twelve apostles above a niche, were still well preserved. The Frenchman Frédéric Cailliaud (1787-1869) mentioned the monastery, but the information came from the Arabs who had traveled there. After more than half a century, the German African scientist Georg Schweinfurth (1836-1925) reported in 1886 again about the monastery. The monastery enclosure measured 55 x 67 meters, and its entrance was on the south side. The monastery walls and the catacombs church were built from stone blocks that Schweinfurth dated to the 17th century. In the church there were still remains of the representation. On both sides of the altar he made an apse. Other traditions also originate from the British John Gardner Wilkinson (1797-1875, recreation 1825), the British cartographers Hugh John Llewellyn Beadnell (1874-1944, recreation 1899), 1895 (other sources also call 1897/1898 and 1880), the monastery was the archpriest Ishaq el-Baramusi (died 1938) with ten of his followers who from the monastery Paromeos Monastery in Wadi El Natrun, resettled. At first they lived in the crypt. The old walls served as a quarry for new monastery walls and buildings. They built new buildings within the new monastery complex el-Qaṣr above the crypt, serving as reception rooms, monks' cells, magazines, kitchen and bakery. In the area of the monastery, another fountain was dug or cleared in 1899, the water of which could not be used as drinking water because of its salty taste. The completion of a new church for the Virgin St. Mary, Ishaq and his pupil and archpriest Ibrahim no longer experienced the death because they had died before. With the partial demolition of old buildings unfortunately also lost knowledge about the old monastery.

An archaeological study of the monastery has not yet been carried out. The Egyptian Egyptologist Ahmed Fakhry (1905-1973) visited the monastery in June 1942 and in October 1944 and gave a description of the crypt, the new buildings of the 19th/20th century. Century or the ornamental and floral-decorated stone fragments. At present, about one hundred monks live in the monastery, which operate in the surrounding countryside of the monastery agriculture.

== Churches and institutions within the monastery ==
North side of the Church of the Virgin Mary whose steeple and domes surpass the monastery walls, is a small door to the monastery. When one enters the monastery and the church of the Virgin Mary circling in the counterclockwise direction, one arrives at a 4 small yard. In the north of the courtyard is the entrance to the church of St. Virgo, to the south of the eastern monastery wall a building with some monk cells and in the south of the court of the el-Qaṣr called part of the monastery with the monk's cells, the crypt and the church of St. Misael.

South side of the Church of the Virgin Mary The inner monastery area is surrounded by a wall about five to six meters high. You can reach the monastery from the east. Before the entrance is an about 70-meter 2 yard at the north side of a new 3 three naves with two church towers and a central dome against the altar arises, The church was not finished and consecrated in 2010. About 300 meters northwest of this new church, the remnants of former monastery facilities and the former monastery enclosing wall are located in the far north.

The Church of the Virgin Mary is the youngest church and was erected in 1958 on the site of a former church. The three-nave church, about 20 meters long from the west to the east, is crowned by twelve domes. In the east of the church there are three helices, altar rooms, for Archangel Michael in the north, te Holy Virgin Mary and St. George. The altar rooms are also crowned by a dome. On the north wall are the relics of Sts Samuel the Confessor and St. Apollo.

North side of the Church of St. Misael In the south of the courtyard, on the top floor is built by father Ishaac 1905 6 Church of Sts. Misael . This church with a pointed roof has only one Altar, which is separated from the church by a stone shielding wall. The icons on the screen are modern. Among them are Christ and Mary, and the 12 Apostles and the Eucharist. Other icons bear the portraits of St. George, the Archangel Michael, Samuel and the Ascension of St. Mary.

The life of Misael the Anchorite (Arabic القديس ميصائيل السائح, al-Qiddis Mīṣā'īl as-Sa'ih) at the time of the monastery abbot Isaak, the successor of Samuel, asked the twelve-year-old Misael to join the monastery as a monk. His father no longer believed in God because no children were given him. An old monk advised him to return to the Christian faith. The father, who was now strictly faithful, did as the monk charged him, and his wife bore him a son whom they called Misael. At the age of six, his parents died and Bishop Athanasius drew him up, sent him to school, and administered the paternal inheritance. Misael predicted the rise of famine, and the monastery-chief was not to be afraid of the events. When the famine broke out, poor peasants went against the monastery because they suspected that they were eating food here. Soldiers had to go against the riot of the peasants. Misael spoke to the struggling men and went away with them. He ordered the monastery's priest to take precaution against a renewed famine. A year later a similar hardship was to take place. This time the Governor sent soldiers to confiscate the grain of the monastery. These soldiers, however, were driven out shortly afterwards by other warriors, who gave themselves as hermits from the desert, among them Misael. These ascetics rejected any reward. Misael, however, asked the monastery supervisor Isaac to demand the paternal inheritance of Bishop Athanasius, in order to be able to build a church in his name with money. The church was built on the 13th Kiahk in the presence of Misael and his hermits. Misael prophesied to the convent-priest Isaak that he, Misael, would die in the following year. To the west of the staircase to el-Qaṣr is the only surviving weir and residential tower. He could be reached via a drawbridge on the second floor. It probably dates back to the 6th century. Once there were four such towers in the monastery. Two relics are placed in two cells on the east side of the courtyard. In one of the 7 cells with the relics the bodies of the father are Bisada (Arabic الأنبا بسادة, al-anba Bisāda) and Dumadius (Arabic الأنبا دوماديوس, al-anba Dūmādiyūs). Both were important monks and builders of the Samuel Monastery after his re-colonization.

Relics of the fathers St. Bisada and St. Dumadius In the other cell are the relics of the corpse, personal objects and photos from the life of Andraus of Samueliten (Arabic: القديس أبونا أندراوس الصموئيلي, al-Qiddis Abuna Andraus as Ṣamū'īlī). Andraus was established in 1887 in the village of el-Gafādūn (Arabic: الجفادون) born in the district of el-Faschn and lost with three years of his eyesight. At the age of 13, his father sent him to a branch of the Samuel Monastery where he devoted himself to religious studies. At the age of 22 he entered the monastery. He led a life of obedience and devotion, full of simplicity and wisdom. Every day, despite his blindness, he managed to get the water out of the monastery fountain. In a time of plight, when the monastery had to be abandoned, He alone guarded the monastery for four months only with bread and salty water. He died on February 7, 1988, about ten o'clock in the evening. He is said to have performed miracles even after his death.

The so-called catacombs church of Sts. Samuel is the oldest church in the monastery. It dates back to the 5th century. It is located west of the church of Sts. Misael and is surrounded on all sides by monk's cells. Therefore, their visit is only possible for monks and bishops who do not necessarily need to belong to the Coptic Orthodox rite. The crypt is about eight meters below the current ground level and consists of an anteroom, the narthex, and the church ship. Two stairs lead to a stone altar, the most holy.

== Cave of St. Samuel ==
Approximately 3.3 kilometers of air line east of the Church of Sts. Virgo is located in Gebel el-Qalamūn at 160 meters, about 15 meters below the mountain range on the mountain side. The cave does not have any decoration, but has been marred with modern graffiti. There is only one altar in the cave. At the end of the cave is a water tank, which is fed from rain water. To get to the cave, one needs to turn right behind the gate of the southern wall of the monastery in an easterly direction on a slope that runs parallel to the monastery wall. After an interval of one kilometer, the slope branches off to the north. After about 3.5 kilometers one can reach the monastery farms and from there, after one more kilometer in the east, Samuel.

== Incidents ==
In an attack in El Idwa near Maghagha on May 26, 2017, on a bus with Coptic Christians who were on their way to the monastery, at least 30 people were killed and about two dozen injured. It is said to have been about ten armed attackers who allegedly came from Libya. The terrorist organization Islamic State has claimed the deed for itself.

A similar incident happened on 2 November 2018, when masked gunmen attacked a convoy of buses heading to the monastery. Nine Copt pilgrims from Minya were killed and 12 others were injured.

== See also ==
- Coptic architecture
- Coptic Churches — architecture
- Coptic Orthodox monasteries
- Christian monasteries in Egypt
- Persecution of Copts — includes contemporary events
