= Samuel the Confessor =

Coptic Orthodox saint

Saint Samuel the Confessor
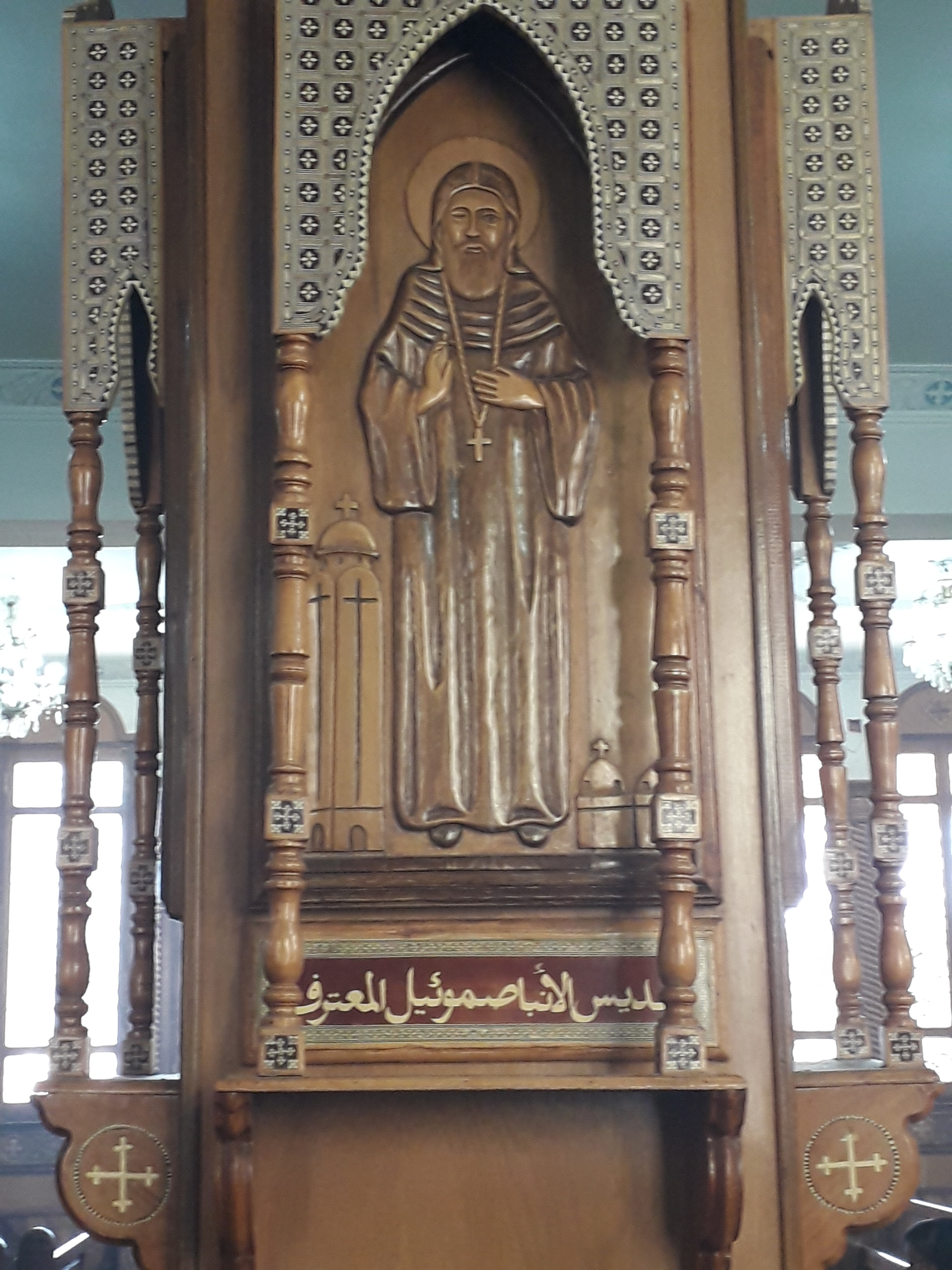
- Saint Samuel icon

Confessor
- Born: 597; Daklube, Egypt
- Died: 17 December 695 (aged 97–98); Mount Qalamoun, Egypt
- Venerated in: Coptic Orthodox Church; Oriental Orthodox Churches
- Major shrine: Monastery of Saint Samuel the Confessor, Egypt
- Feast: 8 Koiak
- Attributes: Monk with one Eye

Samuel the Confessor (597–695), referred to in academic literature as Samuel of Kalamoun or Samuel of Qalamun, was a Coptic Orthodox saint, venerated in all Oriental Orthodox Churches. He is most famous for his torture at the hands of the Chalcedonian Byzantines, for his witness of the Arab invasion of Egypt, and for having built the monastery that carries his name in Mount Qalamoun. He carries the label "confessor" because he endured torture for his Christian faith, but was not a martyr.

The manuscripts of the Coptic text known as the Apocalypse of Samuel of Kalamoun give his name as the author.

== Biography ==
Samuel was born in 597 AD in the city of Daklube, Egypt, to a non-Chalcedonian priest called Arselaos. He spent most of his early years as a disciple of Agathon.

While at the Monastery of Saint Macarius, a Byzantine imperial envoy attempted to convince the desert monks to confess the Chalcedonian faith. Samuel became zealous and seized the imperial letter and rent it into pieces saying "Excommunicated is this tome and everyone who believes in it, and cursed is everyone who might change the Orthodox faith of our Holy Fathers." Seized with anger, the envoy ordered Samuel to be beaten with pins and to be hanged up by his arms, and that his face be smitten. One of the strikes enucleated one of his eyes.

When Cyrus of Alexandria came to the city of Faiyum, he had Samuel brought to him in chains like a thief. Samuel went rejoicing in the Lord and saying, 'Please God, it will be given me this day to shed my blood for the name of Christ.' When Cyrus saw him, he ordered the soldiers to beat him until his blood ran like water. Then he said to him, 'Samuel, you wicked ascetic, who is he that made you abbot of the monastery, and bade you teach the monks to curse me and my faith?' Holy Abba Samuel answered, 'It is good to obey God and His holy Archbishop Benjamin rather than obey you and your devilish doctrine, O son of Satan, Antichrist, Beguiler.' Cyrus bade the soldiers to smite him on the mouth, saying, 'Your spirit is kindled, Samuel, because the monks glorify you as an ascetic: but I will teach you what it is to speak evil of dignities, since you render me not the honour which is my due as Archbishop and my due as Controller of the Revenues of the land of Egypt.' Samuel replied, 'Satan also was controller, having angels under him: but his pride and unbelief estranged him from the glory of God. So with you also, O Chalcedonian Deceiver, your faith is defiled and you are more accursed than the devil and his angels.' On hearing this, the Cyrus was filled with fury against the saint, and signed to the soldiers to strike him dead, but the ruler of Faiyum delivered him from their hands. When Cyrus saw that Samuel had escaped, he ordered him driven away from the Nitrian Desert.

After leaving Scetes, Samuel dwelt in Mount Qalamoun, currently in the Upper Egyptian governorate of Beni Suef. At Mount Qalamoun, Samuel founded a monastery that carries his name and still exists to this day.

Samuel also suffered at the hands of sun-worshiping Berbers who took him captive for some time. In his captivity, he met and befriended Youannis the Archpriest of Scetes, who was also captured by the Berbers. When the Berbers failed to convince Samuel to worship the sun, they tied his leg with an iron chain to that of a maiden, and sent them to attend the camels, hoping that the maiden would seduce Samuel and win him as a sun-worshipper.

Samuel the Confessor died on 8 Koiak 412 AM (17 December 695 AD).

== Life of Samuel of Kalamoun ==
One of the most important surviving sources on Samuel is a hagiography, the Life of Samuel of Kalamoun. The work is attributed to "Isaac the Presbyter", of which almost nothing is known other than he was a monk at the Monastery of Saint Samuel the Confessor, saying he wrote "four generations" after Samuel's death, suggesting a range between the end of the 8th century or the beginning of the 9th century. Four manuscripts survived to the modern era: a version in Sahidic Coptic, a translated version in Ethiopic, and two fragmentary versions, one in Sahidic and the other in Bohairic Coptic.

In the work, Samuel's parents are named Silas and Kosmiane. Samuel becomes a sub-deacon at the age of 12 and insists from an early age on becoming a monk and living an ascetic life. His father's concerns are quelled after an angel reassures him; Silas builds a church and ordains his son a deacon of it. Kosmiane dies when Samuel is 18, and Silas dies when Samuel is 22. Samuel sets out for Scetis, known as a center of enlightenment, and meets an aged ascetic, Agathou. He trains for three years under him until Agathou's death, but becomes a respected monk and is empowered by Agathou's spirit. At this point Cyrus of Alexandria arrives to take up the bisophric of Alexandria. He attempts to combine Miaphysite Christians and Chalcedonian Christians into one group; the work refers to his teachings as the "Tome of Leo". When a messenger of Cyrus arrives at Scetis, Samuel asks if he can see the copy of the "Tome of Leo", then tears it to shreds. He is severely flogged and expelled from Scetis as a result.

Samuel and four loyal disciples travel south to a monastery at Neklone, near Fayyum. He lives there for three and a half years before he receives word that Bishop Cyrus is visiting Fayyum. Samuel tells the other monks to evacuate and meets Cyrus himself; he and the bishop have a "martyrological" exchange as Cyrus attempts to convince Samuel to cease his resistance. Samuel is beaten within an inch of his life. He leaves Neklone and goes to Takinash, where he resides for 6 months. Samuel hears a voice from God telling him to go into the wilderness. God leads him to a deserted church in Kalamun. Marauding Libyan nomads, returning from a pilgrimage, find him and seize him in the church, but the camel they put him on refuses to move, inspired by God to be obstinate. The marauders return later and are more successful, this time taking him to Siwa to be sold as a slave. While in Siwa, he meets John the Hegemon, who has also been enslaved. During his three-year captivity, the Berbers attempt to convert him to paganism and to abandon his chastity, but he refuses. God grants Samuel the power to perform miracles, and the Berbers wisely release him with a gift of several fine camels.

Samuel returns to the monastery at Kalamun, where his four disciples and many others return. The monastery receives donations, including from the normally miserly Bishop Gregory of Koeis; Mena the Eparch of Pelhip, who is possibly a relative of Samuel; and a man named Apollo, who takes over the finances and trade of the monastery. Samuel goes on to live at the monastery for fifty-seven more years.

== See also ==
- Monastery of Saint Samuel the Confessor
- Council of Chalcedon
- Coptic monasticism
