= Testament of Jacob =

Old Testament apocrypha

The Testament of Jacob is a work now regarded as part of the Old Testament apocrypha. It is often treated as one of a trio of very similar works called the Testament of the Patriarchs, the other two of which are the Testament of Abraham and Testament of Isaac, though there is no reason to assume that they were originally a single work. All three works are based on the Blessing of Jacob, found in the Bible, in their style. Christian elements are usually regarded as later additions to what were originally purely Jewish works.

== Content ==
The Testament of Jacob begins with Jacob being visited by the archangel Michael who told of his impending death. Jacob was then taken on a visit to heaven, where he first sees the torture of the sinful dead, then later meets the deceased Abraham. In this Testament, it is the angels that Jacob meets who deliver the bulk of the sermonising passages.

=== Chapter 1 ===
The testament opens 'in the name of the Father, the Son, and the Holy Spirit, the one God'. God sends the archangel Michael to Jacob to tell him that it is time for him to die and go to heaven to join his father Isaac and grandfather Abraham. Jacob accepts this and God blesses him.

=== Chapter 2 ===
Jacob meets his son Joseph in Egypt.

=== Chapter 3 ===
An angel speaks to Jacob and reminds him of all the times that God has blessed him.

=== Chapter 4 ===
The angel returns to heaven. Jacob tells his family that God will look after them and their descendants.

=== Chapter 5 ===
Jacob and Joseph speak of Jacob's funeral arrangements.

=== Chapter 6 ===
Jacob blesses Joseph's sons, Manasseh and Ephraim.

=== Chapter 7 ===
Jacob speaks to all of his children.

=== Chapter 8 ===
(There are then 2 versions of this chapter. One is the Arabic text which shares a description of sinners being tormented and punished. One is the Bohairic text which shows Jacob in heaven.)

=== Chapter 9 ===
Jacob dies. God, with the archangels Michael and Gabriel, takes Jacob to heaven to be with Isaac and Abraham.

=== Chapter 10 ===
Pharaoh gives Joseph permission to leave Egypt to bury his father Jacob. Joseph then returns to Egypt.

=== Chapter 11 ===
The narrator speaks of Isaac's life.

=== Chapter 12 ===
The narrator gives instructions on godly living, including love and hospitality.

=== Chapter 13 ===
The narrator gives instructions on anger, idolatry, generosity and compassion.

The narrator speaks of God, Jesus the Savior and the Holy Spirit.

== See also ==
- Testaments of the Three Patriarchs
