= Testament of Abraham =

Text of Jewish apocalyptic literature

The Testament of Abraham is a pseudepigraphic text probably composed in the 1st or 2nd century AD. It is of Jewish origin and is usually considered to be part of the apocalyptic literature. It is regarded as scripture by Beta Israel Ethiopian Jews, but not by any other Jewish or Christian groups. It is often treated as one of a trio of very similar works, the other two of which are the Testament of Isaac and Testament of Jacob, though there is no reason to assume that they were originally a single work. All three works are based on the Blessing of Jacob, found in the Bible, in their style.

The Testament of Abraham was likely written originally in Koine Greek, by someone living in Roman Egypt. Its vocabulary is similar to that used in the later books of the Septuagint and in 3 Maccabees, which were written in Egypt.

== Manuscript tradition ==
The Greek text of the Testament of Abraham is preserved in two quite different recensions:

- the long recension, which has a more developed, detailed and linear story, survives in about thirty manuscripts, among which the more important are A, E and B.
- the short recension, where the episodes are sometimes abrupt and not logically connected but with probably an earlier wording, has survived in about nine manuscripts, among which the more important are A and E (manuscript E of the short recension is notable because of the presence of many semitisms).

There is no consensus among scholars as to which recension is nearer the original, or whether we shall suppose one or more original texts. The early scholars, as James, but also recently Ludlow, working mainly on the narrative viewpoint, support the priority of the long recension. This view has been challenged for example by Turner, who studied the text from a linguistic point of view, and mainly by Schmidt, who worked deeply on manuscript E of the short recension, which was not available to the early editors.

The text is preserved also in Slavonic, Romanian, Ethiopic (Falasha), Coptic Bohairic and Arabic. These versions, apart one Romanian recension, follow the content of the Greek short recension. The Greek Text was first edited, with an English translation and introduction, by M. R. James in 1892. The Greek text was also early edited by Vassiliev in 1893.

== Origin and date ==
As regards its origin James writes: "The Testament was originally put together in the second century by a Jewish Christian, who for the narrative portions employed existing Jewish legends, and for the apocalyptic, he drew largely on his imagination". James holds that the book is referred to by Origen, Horn.in Luc. xxxv. With the exception of x.xi. the work is really a legend and not an apocalypse. To the above conclusions Schürer, takes objection, and denies the reference in Origen, asserting that there are no grounds for the assumption of a partial Jewish origin. Kohler on the other hand has given adequate grounds for regarding this apocrypha as in the main an independent work of Jewish origin subsequently enlarged by a few Christian additions, and it is Kohler's stance that most scholars follow today.

The Testament of Abraham was likely written originally in Greek, by someone living in Egypt at the time. This is due to the fact that the vocabulary found in the text is quite similar to the vocabulary used in the later books of the Septuagint, which were being written at that time, in addition to other books, such as 3 Maccabees, that we know were written around that time in Egypt. In addition, there are aspects of the story that seem to reflect aspects of Egyptian life, such as the three judgments which mirror the three levels of Egyptian government. Unfortunately these reasons for the place of origin being Egypt are only supported by the long recension of the Testament of Abraham.

The short recension therefore has no definite place or date of origin. While it would be logical to assume that it had its origins in the same place and time as the long recension, as there is no concrete evidence, any Jewish cultural center could therefore be a possibility for its origin.

== Content ==
This testament deals with Abraham's reluctance to die and the means by which his death was brought about. Overall, the long recension is about twice as long as the short recension, though both relate the same overall plot.

- Chapter 1 (long recension/short recension): God tells the angel Michael to "Go down … to my friend Abraham and speak to him concerning death, so that he might put his affairs in order." This exact phrasing comes from the long recension, though the short recension has a similar wording. The long recension also includes a list of Abraham's virtues, particularly highlighting his hospitality, and it mentions that he was at the "Oak of Mamre". The conversation between God and Michael is also longer than in the short recension.
- Chapter 2 (long recension/short recension): Michael comes down to earth and finds Abraham in a field. They greet each other, and Michael dodges a few questions about his origins, causing Abraham to treat Michael as an ordinary man. Then Abraham invites Michael to his home and offers Michael the use of a horse to get there, which Michael refuses. The precise phrasing and order of the conversation changes between the recensions, but the overall effect of the conversations is very similar between the two recensions. Perhaps the biggest difference is that in the short recension, Abraham speaks about how he was named, while in the long recension, the question dodging is longer. Additionally, the long recension mentions again that Abraham is near the Oak of Mamre.
- Chapter 3 (long recension/short recension): On the way back to the house, a tree (specified as a cypress tree in the long recension) speaks to Abraham, though Abraham does not draw attention to the tree. When they get to the house, Abraham tells Isaac to wash Michael's feet. This causes Michael to cry, and his tears become precious stones. In the long recension, Isaac recognizes that Michael is not human. Additionally, Abraham takes Michael's tears (that were turned into precious stones). They appear again in the long recension, but are forgotten in the short recension. In the short recension, Abraham starts the preparations for dinner.
- Chapter 4 (long recension/short recension): Michael returns to Heaven and tells God that Abraham is too nice—Michael is unable to tell Abraham of his death. God promises to send a dream to Isaac that will show Abraham's death. In the long recension, the dinner preparations start in this chapter, and God says that Michael will have to interpret the dream. The short recension mentions that all angels worship God at sunset (which explains how Michael went back to heaven), while the long recension leaves this unexplained.
- Chapter 5 (long recension)/Chapter 5-6:6 (short recension): Michael comes back down to Earth and eats dinner with Abraham. Isaac then goes to sleep and dreams of Abraham's death, though the contents of the dream are not discussed yet. This causes Isaac to run over to Abraham and hug him while crying, which in turn causes Abraham and Michael to start crying as well. Sarah then enters and asks whether all of the weeping is because Michael said that Lot died. There is little difference between the two recensions in this section.
- Chapter 6 (long recension)/Chapter 6:6-6:13 (short recension): Sarah recognizes Michael as one of the angels in Genesis 18, and Abraham confirms this by remembering that Michael has the same feet (Abraham washed Michael's feet and those of the three visitors in Genesis 18). In the long recension, Michael's tears (which turned into precious stones) are mentioned as further proof of Michael's identity.
- Chapter 7 (long recension)/Chapter 7:1-18 (short recension): Isaac explains his dream. In it, a "glorious man" took the sun and the moon from Isaac. Michael reveals his full identity and states that the sun is Abraham, the moon is Sarah, and the glorious man taking away both the sun and the moon represents Abraham and Sarah dying. Michael then orders Abraham to put his affairs in order. In the long recension, Abraham refuses to come.
- Chapter 8 (long recension): In the long recension, Michael runs back to heaven and relates Abraham's refusal. God gives a speech (that Michael is supposed to relate to Abraham later on) about how He blessed Abraham, so Abraham should not refuse His will. There is no analogue of this scene in the short recension (Abraham does not directly refuse to go with Michael).
- Chapter 9 (long recension)/Chapter 7:19-8:2 (short recension): Abraham requests that he be shown the entire world before he dies, Michael relays that request to God, and God accepts it. The long recension also includes Michael relaying God's speech and Abraham repenting his earlier words before making his request.
- Chapter 10 (long recension)/Chapter 12 (short recension): In the long recension, the next event is when Michael takes Abraham on the "Chariot of the Cherubim". Abraham sees the entire world, including several sinners (murderers, people committing adultery, and thieves). When he sees the sinners, he requests that they be killed in various ways, and the request is granted. Analogues of the long recension's chapters 10-13 appear in the short recension, but the order is changed.
- Chapter 11 (long recension)/Chapter 8:3-16, 11:9-12 (short recension): In the long recension, Michael then takes Abraham to Heaven, where he sees a small gate and a large gate, with a man on a gold throne seated between them. The man spends most of his time weeping. A massive crowd travels through the large gate, while a few souls go in the small gate. Eventually, Abraham finds out that the large gate is where the souls of sinners go to damnation, the small gate is where the souls of the righteous go to paradise, and the man is Adam, who rejoices when souls are saved and weeps when souls are damned.
- Chapter 12 (long recension)/Chapter 9-10 (short recension): Abraham then goes to the place where souls are judged. He also finds a soul that is perfectly balanced between good and evil. In the long recension, a man on a throne judges souls. There are four angels below him, two angels that act as scribes, one fiery angel, and one angel with scales to weigh the soul. The balanced soul is being judged when Abraham shows up. In the short recension, Abraham finds the balanced soul before going to the place of judgement, the judge himself has only one helper, and when Abraham shows up, a woman who committed adultery with her daughter's husband, killed her daughter, and then forgot the entire episode is being judged. For obvious reasons, she is damned.
- Chapter 13 (long recension)/Chapter 11:1-11, 13:8-14 (short recension): Abraham asks about the identity of the judge and his helpers. Michael responds that Abel is the judge. In the short recension, Abel's helper is Enoch. In the long recension, Michael explains that once final judgement comes, Abel will be supplemented by two additional judges: after Abel, everyone will be judged by the 12 tribes of Israel and finally by God. At this point, Michael explains the purpose of the various angel helpers: one of the scribe angels records every soul's good deeds, the other scribe angel records every soul's sins, the scale angel is Dokiel, who weighs the sins and righteous deeds of each soul, and the fiery angel is Puriel, who tests every soul with fire.
- Chapter 14 (long recension): Abraham prays for the balanced soul in Chapter 12, which convinces God to save the soul. Abraham then decides that his damning of the sinners in Chapter 10 was a mistake, and prays to God that they be saved. God agrees. There is no analogue to this scene in the short recension.
- Chapter 15 (long recension)/Chapter 12:14-16 (short recension): Abraham and Michael return to earth. In the short recension, Sarah dies. In the long recension, Abraham again states that he will not go with Michael, which causes Michael to run back to Heaven and tell God about what happened.
- Chapter 16 (long recension)/Chapter 13:1-8 (short recension): God sends Death, in a pretty guise, to take Abraham away. In the long recension, Death is capable of disguising himself. Also, Death tells Abraham who he is, and Abraham professes not to believe him. In the short recension, Michael disguises Death, and Abraham simply does not realize who Death is.
- Chapter 17 (long recension)/Chapter 13:9-14:5 (short recension): Abraham argues with Death, and continues to refuse to believe that the figure in front of him is Death, because the figure is too beautiful. Eventually, Abraham convinces Death to reveal himself in all his ugliness. At this point, many servants die. In the long recension, 7,000 servants die, while in the short recension, only 7 servants die.
- Chapter 18 (long recension)/Chapter 14:5 (short recension): Abraham prays to God in order to revive the servants. In the long recension, this is preceded by Death becoming beautiful again and some discussion about whether the servants were supposed to die. Additionally, Abraham manages to convince Death to join him in prayer for the servants in the long recension.
- Chapter 19 (long recension): Abraham tries to convince Death to leave him again and send Michael back down, though Death does not immediately comply. Abraham also convinces Death to describe the reasons behind his monstrous form. There is no analogue to this scene in the short recension.
- Chapter 20 (long recension)/Chapter 14:6-7 (short recension): Death finally kills Abraham. In the short recension, this is described as "in a dream". In the long recension, Death entreats Abraham to go with him now, but Abraham claims to be feeling weak in order to convince Death to leave for a time. In response, Death convinces Abraham to kiss his hand so that Abraham will feel better. In fact, this kiss kills Abraham. Abraham's body is buried, and Abraham's soul is taken up to heaven.

== Significance ==
When viewed as a religious text, the Testament of Abraham gives a unique message. Beyond the presence of angels and God and Death, the lesson demonstrated is simply being a good person, performing good acts, and avoiding bad ones. In the scenes of judgment, there is no distinction made between whether people are Jewish or Gentile, only whether they have performed good deeds or bad. The reader is then left with an idea of universally fair treatment, not influenced by lineage or any other traits, when it comes to judgment, where a person whose sins outweigh their good deeds will be sentenced to eternal punishment, while one whose good deeds outweigh their sins will move on to paradise.

== Humor ==
While this text does have its theological significance, it can also be simply viewed as a story meant to entertain. Throughout the entire text, the ever pious Abraham attempts to dodge and avoid God's will; rather than this portrayal painting Abraham in a non-pious light, Abraham instead recognizes how good and devout he has been throughout his entire life, and uses that to his advantage. He is so good at avoiding God's decree that the only way he finally has his soul taken away is when Death tricks him. Another humorous character is the Archangel Michael. God's "Commander-in-Chief" is an angel who would seem to be able to make decisions on his own and handle the refusals of Abraham, but he cannot. Every time that Abraham does something that Michael does not expect, he comes up with some reason to excuse himself then rushes up to heaven to consult God and find out what he is to do with stubborn Abraham.

== See also ==
- Testaments of the Three Patriarchs

== Resources ==
- Allison, Dale C., Testament of Abraham, (Berlin: Walter de Gruyter, 2003). ISBN 978-3-11-017888-3.
- Charlesworth, James H., The Old Testament Pseudepigrapha: Apocalyptic Literature and Testaments, Volume 1, (New Haven, Connecticut: Yale University Press, 1983), 869–902. ISBN 978-0-300-14019-4.
- Delcor, Matthias, Le Testament d'Abraham: Introduction, traduction du texte grec et commentaire de la recension grecque longue, (Leiden: Brill, 1973).
- Gruen, Erich S., Diaspora: Jews amidst Greeks and Romans, (Cambridge, Massachusetts: Harvard University Press, 2002). ISBN 0-674-00750-6.
- Ludlow, Jared W., Abraham Meets Death: Narrative Humor in the Testament of Abraham, Journal for the Study of the Pseudepigrapha Supplement Series 41 (London: Sheffield Academic Press, 2002). ISBN 0-8264-6204-9.
- Nickelsburg, Jr., George W.E., "Studies on the Testament of Abraham" ISBN 0-89130-117-8 (Missoula: Scholar's Press, 1976).
- Rosso, L., Testamento di Abramo in ed. P.Sacchi Apocrifi dell'Antico Testamento Vol 4 ISBN 88-394-0587-9 (2000).
- Sanders, E. P., Testament of Abraham, a new Translation and Introduction in ed. James Charlesworth The Old Testament Pseudepigrapha, Vol 1 ISBN 0-385-09630-5 (1983) p. 871-902
- Sparks, H. F. D., The Apocryphal Old Testament ISBN 0-19-826177-2 (1984).
- Stone, Michael E., The Testament of Abraham, (Missoula: Scholar's Press, 1972).
