= Testament of Isaac =

Old Testament apocrypha

The Testament of Isaac is a work now regarded as part of the Old Testament apocrypha. It is often treated as one of a trio of very similar works, the other two of which are the Testament of Abraham and Testament of Jacob, though there is no reason to assume that they were originally a single work. All three works are based on the Blessing of Jacob, found in the Bible, in their style.

There is no definite date for the writing of this work, but is believed that it was written between 200AD and 400AD.

It is believed that the book was written in Coptic, although versions exist in Arabic.

== Content ==
The Testament of Isaac has heavy Christian themes, though the Christian elements are usually regarded as later additions to what was originally a purely Jewish work. The Testament begins with Isaac being told of his impending death by an angel, and his message to his son in response. Isaac here is portrayed as foretelling both the Twelve Tribes of Israel and Jesus, the latter being a later Christian addition to the text. When a crowd assembles, Isaac gives a sermon about harmonious behaviour, as well as instruction on how to confess.

At this point, the angel returns and takes Isaac to heaven, first seeing the torture of sinners (occurring in heaven and not in some underworld hell according to the author), and then meeting the deceased Abraham. At this point Isaac is not quite dead, and so returns to earth, and on the instruction of Abraham, writes down his Testament, and then dies and returns to heaven in a flying chariot, much like Abraham in his Testament.

=== Chapter 1 ===
Opening - Isaac addresses his son Jacob and others with words of instruction.

=== Chapter 2 ===
God sends the angel Zadkiel (the same one who visited Abraham) to bring Isaac to heaven. Isaac believes this is his father, Abraham, but the angel corrects him.

=== Chapter 3 ===
Isaac tells the angel he is worried about his son Jacob. The angel tells Isaac that the whole family is blessed; he then instructs Isaac to write down instructions for the family. Jacob hears this conversation.

=== Chapter 4 ===
The angel returns to heaven. Isaac knows he will die the same day and Jacob tells him that he has heard everything. Isaac tells Jacob that in the future, in forty-two generations time, Christ will be born of a virgin called Mary. He goes on to prophesy Christ's death and resurrection, the twelve disciples and the eucharist.

=== Chapter 5 ===
Short narration of Isaac's life of fasting and prayer.

=== Chapter 6 ===
Isaac gives instructions on clean speech and sacrifice to God.

=== Chapter 7 ===
Isaac gives instructions to priests and general instructions for all men.

=== Chapter 8 ===
The angel returns and takes Isaac to another realm where he sees sinners being punished.

=== Chapter 9 ===
Isaac sees more sinners being punished.

=== Chapter 10 ===
The angel takes Isaac to heaven where he meets Abraham and they visit God. God tells Abraham that all those who follow the testament of Abraham will be saved. Abraham and God discuss the best way to do this. God says that the best way is to give a sacrifice, by being compassionate and sharing with the poor. God says that the power of God, God's Son and the Holy Spirit will be with such people.

=== Chapter 11 ===
The heavens worship God. God, the archangel Michael and Abraham then visit Isaac in his home.

=== Chapter 12 ===
Isaac and Abraham hug. God says that in the future, He will become a man and die and rise on the third day. Isaac warns Jacob not to dishonour God. Isaac then dies and goes to heaven.

=== Chapter 13 ===
The writer notes that Isaac died on the twenty-fourth of the month of Mesore. He also notes that any man who performs an act of mercy in the name of Isaac or Abraham will be blessed.

== See also ==
- Testaments of the Three Patriarchs
