= Apocalypse of Ezra =

Apocalypse of Ezra may refer to:

- Jewish Apocalypse of Ezra, more commonly known as 4 Esdras or 2 Esdras.
- Greek Apocalypse of Ezra, which predominantly survives in Greek manuscripts
- Syriac Apocalypse of Ezra, which predominantly survives in Syriac manuscripts
- Ethiopic Apocalypse of Ezra, which seems to have been composed in Ethiopic

== See also ==
- Book of Ezra
- Ezra-Nehemiah
- Apocalypse of Sedrach
- Revelation of Ezra
- Vision of Ezra
- Questions of Ezra
