= List of Old Testament pseudepigrapha =

Pseudepigrapha are falsely attributed works, texts whose claimed author is not the true author, or a work whose real author attributed it to a figure of the past. Some of these works may have originated among Jewish Hellenizers, others may have Christian authorship in character and origin.

== Apocalyptic and related works ==
- 1 (Ethiopic Apocalypse of) Enoch (Jewish, c. 200 BC–50 BC)
- 2 (Slavonic Apocalypse of) Enoch (Jewish, c. 30 BC–70 AD)
- 3 (Hebrew Apocalypse of) Enoch (Jewish, in present form from c. 108 AD-135 AD)
- Sibylline Oracles (both Jewish and Christian, c. 2nd cent. BC–7th cent. AD)
- Treatise of Shem (c. near end of first cent. BC)
- Apocryphon of Ezekiel (mostly lost, original form c. late 1st cent. BC)
- Apocalypse of Zephaniah (mostly lost, original form c. late 1st cent. BC)
- 2 Esdras (original Jewish form after 70 AD, final Christian additions later)
- Greek Apocalypse of Ezra (present form is Christian c. 9th cent. AD with both Jewish and Christian sources)
- Vision of Ezra (a Christian document dating from 4th to 7th cent. AD)
- Questions of Ezra (Christian, but date is imprecise)
- Revelation of Ezra (Christian and sometime before 9th cent. AD)
- Apocalypse of Sedrach (present form is Christian from c. 5th cent. with earlier sources)
- 2 (Syriac Apocalypse of) Baruch (Jewish, from c. 100 AD)
- 3 (Greek Apocalypse of) Baruch (Christian utilizing Jewish sources, c. 1st–2nd cent. AD)
- Apocalypse of Abraham (Jewish primarily, c. 70–150 AD)
- Apocalypse of Adam (Gnostic derived from Jewish sources from c. the 1st cent. AD)
- Apocalypse of Elijah (both Jewish and Christian, c. 150–275 AD)
- Apocalypse of Daniel (present form c. 9th cent. AD, but contains Jewish sources from c. 4th cent. AD).

== Testaments ==
- Testaments of the Twelve Patriarchs (current form is Christian, c. 150–200 AD, but Levi, Judah, and Naphtali are Jewish and date before 70 AD and probably 2nd–1st cent. BC)
- Testament of Job (Jewish, c. late 1st cent. BC)
- Testaments of the Three Patriarchs (Jewish Testaments of Abraham, Isaac, and Jacob from c. 100 AD which are linked with the Christian Testament of Isaac and Jacob)
- Testament of Moses (Jewish, from c. early 1st cent. AD)
- Testament of Solomon (Jewish, current form c. 3rd cent. AD, but earliest form c. 100 AD)
- Testament of Adam (Christian in current form c. late 3rd cent. AD, but used Jewish sources from c. 150–200 AD).

== Expansions of Old Testament and other legends ==
- The Letter of Aristeas (Jewish, c. 200–150 BC)
- Jubilees (Jewish, c. 150–100 BC)
- Ascension of Isaiah (has three sections, the first Jewish from c. 100 BC, and 2nd and 3rd sections are Christian. The second from c. 2nd cent. AD, and the third— Testament of Hezekiah, c. 90–100 AD)
- Joseph and Aseneth (Jewish, c. 100 AD)
- Life of Adam and Eve (Jewish, c. early to middle 1st cent. AD)
- Pseudo-Philo (Jewish, c. 66–135 AD)
- Lives of the Prophets (Jewish, c. early 1st cent. AD with later Christian additions)
- Ladder of Jacob (earliest form is Jewish dating from late 1st cent. AD. One chapter is Christian)
- 4 Baruch (Jewish original but edited by a Christian, c. 100–110 AD)
- Jannes and Jambres (Christian in present form, but dependent on earlier Jewish sources from c. 1st cent. BC)
- History of the Rechabites (Christian in present form dating c. 6th cent. AD, but contains some Jewish sources before 100 AD)
- Eldad and Modat (forged on basis of Numbers 11.26–29, before the 1st AD is now lost, but quoted in Shepherd of Hermas c. 140 AD)
- History of Joseph (Jewish, but difficult to date)
- Story of Melchizedek (Jewish, 1st–3rd centuries AD)
- Sefer Yetzirah
- Sefer Raziel HaMalakh

== Wisdom and philosophical literature ==
- Story of Ahikar (Jewish dating from late 7th or 6th cent. BC and cited in Apocryphal Tobit)
- 3 Maccabees (Jewish, c. 1st cent. BC)
- 4 Maccabees (Jewish, c. before 70 AD)
- Pseudo-Phocylides (Jewish maxims attributed to 6th cent. Ionic poet, c. 50 BCE–100 AD)
- The Sentences of the Syriac Menander (Jewish, c. 3rd cent. AD).

== Prayers, Psalms, and Odes ==
- More Psalms of David (Jewish psalms from c. 3rd cent. BC to 100 AD)
- Prayer of Manasseh (sometimes in Apocrypha, Jewish from c. early 1st cent. AD)
- Psalms of Solomon (Jewish, c. 50–5 BC)
- Hellenistic Synagogal Prayers (Jewish, c. 2nd–3rd cent. AD)
- Prayer of Joseph (Jewish, c. 70–135)
- Prayer of Jacob (mostly lost Jewish document from c. 4th cent. AD)
- Odes of Solomon (Christian but influenced by Judaism and probably also Qumran, c. 100 AD)

== See also ==
- Apocrypha for books rejected by Jews but accepted by some Christians
- Deuterocanonical books
- New Testament apocrypha for books in the style of the New Testament

== Bibliography ==
- Lee Martin McDonald, The Origin of the Bible: A Guide for the Perplexed, London: T & T Clark, 2011.
