= Kalandologion =

A kalandologion (Greek καλανδολόγιον, 'almanac'; plural kalandologia) is a type of omen text that purports to predict the effects of the beginning of the year falling on a certain day of the week or in a certain sign of the zodiac. The predictions are meteorological, agricultural, epidemiological, social and political. Kalandologia are found in Greek, Syriac, Mandaic, Ethiopic, Latin, Coptic and Arabic. Before the end of the Middle Ages versions had appeared in many western vernaculars.

Coptic papyrus P.Mich. inv. 590

Czech kalandologion in Austrian National Library, Cod. 3282

The origins of the genre are unclear. Attempts have been made to trace it back to Babylonian astrology or Hellenistic astrology. It is certainly ancient. The Jewish Treatise of Shem probably dates to the first century AD. In the Christian tradition, these texts are most commonly attributed to Ezra. John of Nikiu, writing in Egypt in the sixth century, attests that many Christians used a kalandologion attributed to Ezra. In his Canons, written early in the eighth century, Patriarch Nikephoros I of Constantinople condemns their use, calling them "unclean".

At least three distinct Greek kalandologia survive. The Latin version is known as the Revelatio Esdrae. Its earliest manuscript is from the ninth century. Although usually attributed to Ezra, there is a version misattributed to Bede. The Syriac and Arabic versions are attributed to Daniel and are known from tenth-century manuscripts. In English versions, the name of Ezra has been corrupted to "Erra Pater". Vernacular versions attributed to Ezra are known from Old Occitan, Italian, Dutch, German and Czech. The Old French versions, including an Anglo-Norman one that begins the year on Christmas rather than 1 January, are usually attributed to Ezekiel. Many Greek copies are anonymous. The Coptic kalandologion regards the start of the year for prognostic purposes as the sixth of Ṭūba, which corresponded to the first (or kalends) of January, the start of the year in the Roman Empire. Several Coptic kalandologia include a second part that makes predictions based on the strength and direction of the wind in the week of the sixth of Ṭūba. The fragmentary Coptic kalandologion in the 9th-century papyrus P.Mich. inv. 590 is of the latter type, for example:

If the east wind comes on 8 Tubi, there will be a great winter, the weather will be good, the cattle will miscarry, the wheat will become as dry as cumin, the men will suffer severe illnesses, and the children will die.

If a south wind comes forth on the dawn of 9 Tubi, and the north winds comes forth at evening, it means a great summer, the crops will increase, the small livestock will miscarry but will not continue (to do so), and the honey will become profitable.
