= Apocalypse of Pseudo-Ezra =

Set of visions of the end times composed in the Syriac language

The start of the Apocalypse (indicated by red ink) in the manuscript Mingana 11

The Apocalypse of Pseudo-Ezra is a set of visions of the end times falsely attributed to Ezra. It is a short Syriac text, about seven manuscript pages, composed sometime between the 7th and 12th centuries. It recapitulates history in the form of prophecy using obscure animal imagery. Written to console Christians living under Islamic rule, it predicts the end of such rule in the Near East. It is one of the Syriac apocalyptic texts.

The actual author of the text is anonymous. As the text lacks theological specifics, it cannot be determined to which confession the author belonged. The text itself is often seen as the work of an editor stitching together two preexisting apocalypses, but there is no scholarly agreement on the date of the final text. The Syriac text is preserved in at least sixteen manuscripts, all quite late. Additionally, there is an Arabic recension preserved in a single late manuscript. The Syriac version has been published several times and translated into English.

== Title and genre ==
The title supplied to the Apocalypse by the scribes is some variant of "the question that Ezra asked when he was in the desert with his disciple", with Ezra often qualified as "the scribe" and the disciple named as "Carpus". The full Syriac title is Shēltā d-shēl ʿĀzrā sāprā kad hwā b-madbrā w-talmideh ʿameh da-shmeh Qarpus. Modern convention is to call the work the Apocalypse of Pseudo-Ezra, the Syriac Apocalypse of Ezra or the Syriac Esdras Apocalypse. Richard Gottheil calls it the Revelation of Ezra.

The work is classified as an apocalypse because it is a revelation about the future. It is firmly rooted in this world, however, and has nothing to say about heaven or hell. It may be classified with the Syriac historical apocalypses that were popular in the first century of Islam, the purpose of which was to "console Christians who had become the subjects of a new empire and religion." Michael Stone classifies it as one of the "political" Ezra apocalypses, along with the Ethiopic Apocalypse of Ezra. The scribal title does not indicate the work as an apocalypse or vision. The explicit or superscription, however, identifies the work as "the vision of Ezra the scribe". The fuller form of the explicit in Syriac reads Ḥezwā da-ḥzā ʿĀzrā sāprā ʿal malkutā d-Ishmaʿlāyē ("the vision of Ezra the Scribe which he saw concerning the kingdom of the Ishmaelites"). The title and the explicit are rubricated (i.e., in red ink) in the manuscript Mingana 11.

== Synopsis ==
The Apocalypse takes up only about seven pages in the manuscripts. It begins in the third person, describing how Ezra asked God to reveal what will happen in "the end times of the Ishmaelites", a Christian term for Arabs or Muslims. The text then switches to the first person as Ezra describes what he read and saw in a series of visions. He first describes to his disciple Carpus (Qarpos) how he had a vision in which an angel in the form of a young man in white handed him a scroll containing the answer to his question. There rest of text can be divided into two sets of visions. The visions themselves consist of "very obscure" and "bewildering" animal imagery.

=== First part ===
In the first vision, a serpent with twelve horns on its head and nine smaller horns on its tail comes up from the desert to devour all of creation. An angel dressed in flames tears off its twelve horns, fulfilling the "prophecy of Moses" (Genesis 17:20). A great horn then springs up from the tail, having two small horns of its own. An eagle from the south then devours all the horns, but a whirlwind tears off its two talons.

A viper then comes from the east, poisoning everything "up to the border of the Promise" (probably the Promised Land). There is an earthquake and a voice from heaven calls for the release of "those four kings who are bound on the great river Euphrates, those who are prepared to destroy one out of three people." They are released. Ravens from the east attack the viper, which flees to Egypt with its two "chicks". At the behest of the younger chick, the lion cub sends for the leopard of the south to protect the vipers.

=== Second part ===
A bull with three horns, who is the king of the ravens, is ravaging the land of the west. He will make war on the lion cub "and much blood will be shed between the two mighty men" before the bull contends with "the seven hills and the great city of Constantine." The youngest viper will then lead an army from Tarqono (possibly Trachonitis or Thrace) to ravage Damascus while his father leads an army of the Kushites to ravage Egypt.

The lion cub will ravage the land of the ravens from Antioch to the east. A leopard leading a people like locusts out of the north meets the lion cub at the Euphrates to march on Persia. The bull meets them and the lion cub breaks off its horns. The ravens flee and their land is utterly destroyed "until they fall and die, without diseases or illnesses, from the fear that rules over them." The lion cub then subjects the Promised Land to tribute, builds a wall around Phoenicia, destroys Damascus, enters Jerusalem in triumph and returns to his royal city.

There follows a lull of three and a half weeks before a "mighty man will come out of the south with a great nation" to reign in peace over the Promised Land for three years and seven months. After this, "the four winds of heaven will be stirred up" and Earth will descend into civil war. God sends "a fearsome angel [to] take hold of the point of the destroying sword" and end the tribulation.

Then "the children of the north ... will go out from the house of Gog and Magog" to commit new atrocities. Two tribes of Ishmaelites and "those who have become sooty at the base of the mountain of the south" go up to Jerusalem and are destroyed by the archangel Michael. "At that time a year is like a month, a month like a week, a week like a day, and a day like an hour." The false messiah will then appear. He will kill Enoch and Elijah on the altar. Finally, angels will cast the Son of Perdition into Gehenna.

=== Interpretation ===
The text is usually treated as mostly vaticinium ex eventu (prophecy after the fact), with scholars seeking to identify the specifics of the visions with historical events that came before. It does, however, contain genuine prophecy (predictions) about the future.

According to Robert Hoyland, the first part "is too terse to be sure of its meaning." Michael Stone likens it to the four empires of Daniel. Wilhelm Bousset offers a scheme based on the Arabic Apocalypse of Peter, which he thought represented a version of the source text for the first part. He identifies the animals with a sequence of Islamic dynasties. The serpent is the Umayyads, the eagle the Abbasids, the viper the Fatimids and the four kings the various Turk dynasties. The lion cub represents the Crusaders. The geography of Pseudo-Ezra, however, does not match the supposed source and is historically inaccurate. The historical Fatimids are associated with Egypt (not the east) and the Abbasids with the east (not south). Likewise, the Crusaders never took Damascus, although this may reflect an actual prediction of the author.

According to Bousset and Hoyland, the second part recounts the Roman–Sasanian War of 602–628. The bull is the Sasanian king Khosrow II, the lion cub the Roman emperor Heraclius and the leopard the latter's Turkish allies. On this view, the text is not a unity, but a compilation, with the latter part having been composed first and the first part later grafted onto it. The bull is not mentioned in the first part. The reference to him as "king of the ravens" suggests an attempt to knit together two independent texts. In the first part, the native Syriac word for "leopard" is used, but in the second part the word translated "leopard" is a Greek borrowing.

The end of the Apocalypse (indicated by red ink) in the manuscript Mingana 11

Lisbeth Fried, treating the text as a unitary composition, regards the bull as the Ishmaelites and the lion cub as the Messiah. The "seven hills" probably refers to the Seven Hills of Rome and the "great city of Constantine" is the city of Constantinople. Those lands which submitted to the Arabs in the 7th century, from Egypt to the Euphrates, are set for destruction, with the cities of Damascus and Antioch singled out.

== Sources and influences ==
The basic setting of the Apocalypse comes from 4 Ezra. The latter was "the oldest and most popular of Ezra pseudepigrapha" and its portrayal of Ezra, rather than that of the biblical Book of Ezra, is the basis for the Syriac Apocalypse. The Apocalypse draws heavily on the Book of Revelation and the Book of Daniel, but also the four canonical Gospels, the Book of Ezekiel, and the epistles of Romans and 2 Thessalonians. The biblical language used is that of the standard Syriac bible, the Peshitta.

The Apocalypse of Pseudo-Ezra was influenced, directly or indirectly, by the Apocalypse of Pseudo-Methodius. Pseudo-Methodian materials include the probable Last Roman Emperor motif and the influence of legends about Alexander the Great on the understanding of Gog and Magog. Three distinctive features of the Arabic Apocalypse of Peter are also present in some form in Pseudo-Ezra: a messianic lion cub, twelve kings followed by nine little kings and the rebuilding of the walls of Phoenicia. There are other less distinctive commonalities. The textual relationship between the Apocalypse of Pseudo-Ezra and the Apocalypse of Peter is unclear because the latter has not been comprehensively studied. It may be that the latter is based on the former.

== Date ==
There is no agreement among scholars on the date of the Apocalypse. The first modern scholar to take note of it, Giuseppe Simone Assemani (1687–1768), identified it as pseudonymous because it refers to Constantinople, a name that only came into usage after AD 324. The earliest surviving manuscript is no earlier than the late 17th century. Between these dates, Assemani placed its composition shortly after the fall of Constantinople (1453).

In an 1887 study, Ludwig Iselin proposed that the Apocalypse is a Christian revision of an originally Jewish work that drew on an Aramaic source also used by the author of the biblical Revelation. His proposals have not gained acceptance. In 1894, Jean-Baptiste Chabot argued that the Apocalypse is an original Christian composition of the 7th or 8th century, written in response to the rise of Islam. In 1896, Bousset, settled on a date after the First Crusade (1095–1099).

Robert Hoyland believes that it is the work of a redactor who combined two apocalypses into a single work using Revelation and Daniel to plug gaps. Like Bousset, Hoyland accepts a late date for the final redaction, situating it in the context of the Fatimid–Seljuk wars of the late 11th century or the Fatimid–Ayyubid wars of the late 12th century. He argues that a focus on Egypt and the use of Revelation both point to a late rather than early medieval date. Revelation is not accepted as canonical in the Syriac churches and was not part of the original Peshitta, but it was included in the Harklean version and would have been available by the late 7th century. Both Hoyland and Bousset, accept an early 7th-century date for the original apocalypse on which the second part is based.

Muriel Debié, on the other hand, puts forward arguments in favour of Chabot's dating, suggesting that the genre of the text belongs to the first century of Islam and "the allusion to attacks on Constantinople might suggest a date after one of the unsuccessful sieges", either the siege of 669 or the siege of 717. Lisbeth Fried also prefers a date "in the last quarter of the seventh century." Sergey Minov expresses "little doubt" that it dates from "the very beginning of the Muslim era, perhaps in the early eighth century."

Laura Estes suggests the first siege of Constantinople (669/674) as the earliest possible date. If the Arabic Apocalypse of Peter made use of Pseudo-Ezra as a source, then the latter was written no later than 1176–1177, the date of the earliest known copy of the Arabic Apocalypse.

== Authorship and provenance ==
Modern scholarship has always regarded the connection of the Apocalypse to Ezra as spurious. The actual author is anonymous. He is conventionally known as Pseudo-Ezra. He may be regarded as a mere redactor or editor of preexisting texts, as by Iselin and Hoyland. Although the work is a pseudepigraphon, it was explicitly excluded as Old Testament pseudepigrapha by the editors of The Old Testament Pseudepigrapha series for being "far removed from the Old Testament in date and character."

The original language of the Apocalypse is Syriac. All known manuscripts were copied in East Syriac script and originate in northern Iraq, between Zawita and Mosul. This suggests that the work itself was composed in an East Syriac context, i.e., by members of the Church of the East. The work is devoid of Christian doctrinal statements that would implicate any particular confession. Internal evidence has been held to suggest a Melkite or Miaphysite provenance, depending on whether the portrayal of the lion cub (i.e., the Roman emperor) is taken as positive or negative. The prominence of Egypt and Ethiopia could also suggest a Miaphysite connection.

== Manuscripts ==
There are sixteen manuscripts that contain the Apocalypse of Pseudo-Ezra. Listed from oldest to latest, those in western collections are:

- Vatican City, Biblioteca Apostolica, Sir. 597, copied probably in the late 17th century
- Birmingham, Cadbury Research Library, Mingana Syriac 11, copied on 16 January 1702 by Hoshabo bar Daniel
- Vatican City, Biblioteca Apostolica, Sir. 164, copied in Mosul on 14 February 1702 by the deacon of Hormizd
- London, British Library, Add. 25875 (=Wright 922), copied in Alqosh on 22 January 1709 by Homo bar Daniel
- Birmingham, Cadbury Research Library, Mingana Syriac 567 (=Mosul 27), copied in Zawita on 13 April 1744 by Thomas bar Abdisho
- Berlin, Staatsbibliothek, 73 (=Sachau 131), copied in Tel Keppe in 1862 by Simeon, son of a deacon
- Paris, Bibliothèque nationale de France, Syr. 326, copied in the 19th century by an unknown scribe
- New York, Union Theological Seminary, Syriac 23 (=Clemons 307), copied in Rabban Hormizd in 1884 by David Qeryat
- Leeds, University Library, Syr. 4, copied in 1889/1890

In addition, there are several manuscripts last known to have been in eastern collections. Addai Scher catalogued Seert 113, copied in the 18th century and last known to have been in the library of the Chaldean Catholic Eparchy of Seert. Jacques-Marie Vosté catalogued six manuscripts containing the Apocalypse. MS 12 in the library of the Chaldean Catholic Archeparchy of Kirkuk is Vosté 9 (=Haddad 15), copied near Alqosh in April 1791 by Abdisho bar Iaunan. The other five manuscripts were formerly of the monastery of Notre-Dame-des-Semences and may have been moved to the Chaldean monastery in Baghdad. All of these were copied in Alqosh. They are numbered 38–42:

- MS 38 was copied in 1884 by Étienne Rais
- MS 39 was copied in 1880 by Damian the monk
- MS 40 was copied on 23 August 1887 by Kaushabai of Tel Keppe
- MS 41 was copied on 29 September 1887 by Thomas the monk
- MS 42 was copied in 1888 by Abraham Abou Behnam of Saqiawa

== Translations and editions ==
Start of the Arabic recension in its only known copy

=== Arabic version ===
There is an Arabic recension of the Apocalypse in which the visions are ascribed to Daniel, who relays them to his disciple, Ezra. It is preserved in a single manuscript copied in 1606, now in Paris, Bibliothèque nationale de France, Ar. 150 (olim 107). It is shorter than the Syriac text, essentially containing only the horned serpent vision, which probably circulated independently. This story, however, is much embellished, making the Arabic text "one of the longest of the apocryphal Daniel apocalypses."

The date of the Arabic version is uncertain. It has the disjointed structure of a composite work. Gerbern Oegema dates it to the period of the Crusades. It is untitled in the manuscript, but Lorenzo DiTommaso adopts the title The Vision of Daniel as Related to Ezra, His Pupil, since the text describes what Daniel saw as a "vision". Most earlier studies adopt some version of Arabic Daniel Apocalypse, an ambiguous title since the publication of another Arabic apocalypse attributed to Daniel in 2002. Gottheil published a partial edition of the Arabic text with a translation into English in 1887. In 1904, Frédéric Macler transcribed the entire text and translated it into French.

=== Modern editions ===
In 1886, Isaac Hall published the first translation of the Apocalypse into a modern European language, an English translation based on the manuscript UTS 23, which had been copied in 1884 from a now lost manuscript dated 1756 in Rabban Hormizd Monastery. Later that year, Friedrich Baethgen published an edition and German translation of the Apocalypse based on the manuscript Sachau 101. In 1896, Chabot published a French translation based on the manuscript BnF 326.

Ten of the manuscripts of the Apocalypse are connected with Rabban Hormizd Monastery, possibly copied during the construction of the nearby Notre-Dame-des-Semences in preparation for the transfer of the monastery's manuscripts. In all but two manuscripts, it is copied alongside the Cave of Treasures. It may have been perceived as an update that brought the Cave's theocentric interpretation of history down to the time of its author.

For her master's thesis at Abilene Christian University, Laura Estes produced a critical edition of the Syriac text and an English translation based on five manuscripts (Mingana 11, BL 25875, Sachau 131, UTS 23, BnF 326).

There is no standard versification of the text. Baethgen and Estes number their sections differently, while Chabot numbered his lines.

== Bibliography ==
- Bauckham, Richard (2013). "The Latin Vision of Ezra: A New Translation and Introduction". In Richard Bauckham; James Davila; Alex Panayotov (eds.). Old Testament Pseudepigrapha: More Noncanonical Scriptures. Vol. 1. William B. Eerdmans. pp. 498–528.
- Bousset, Wilhelm (1896). The Antichrist Legend: A Chapter in Christian and Jewish Folklore. Hutchinson and Co. Originally published in German as Der Antichrist in der Überlieferung des Judentums, des neuen Testaments und der alten Kirche (Göttingen, 1895).
- Charlesworth, James H. (1983). "Introduction to the General Reader". In James H. Charlesworth (ed.). The Old Testament Pseudepigrapha. Vol. 1, Apocalyptic Literature and Testaments. Doubleday. pp. xxi–xxxiv.
- Debié, Muriel (2008). "The Apocalypse of Pseudo-Ezra". In David Thomas; Barbara Roggema (eds.). Christian–Muslim Relations: A Bibliographical History. Vol. 1 (600–900). Brill. pp. 239–241.
- DiTommaso, Lorenzo (2005). The Book of Daniel and the Apocryphal Daniel Literature. Brill.
- DiTommaso, Lorenzo (2018). "The Apocryphal Daniel Apocalypses: Works, Manuscripts, and Overview". Ephemerides Theologicae Lovanienses. 94 (2): 275–316. doi:10.2143/ETL.94.2.3284880.
- Estes, Laura Locke (2016). The Apocalypse of Pseudo-Ezra: Syriac Edition, English Translation, and Introduction (MA thesis). Abilene Christian University.
- Fried, Lisbeth S. (2014). Ezra and the Law in History and Tradition. University of South Carolina Press.
- Gottheil, Richard J. H. (1887). "An Arabic Version of the 'Revelation of Ezra'". Hebraica. 4 (1): 14–17.
- Hall, Isaac (1886). "The Vision of Ezra the Scribe Concerning the Latter Times of the Ishmaelites". Presbyterian Review. 7: 537–541.
- Hoyland, Robert G. (1997). Seeing Islam As Others Saw It: A Survey and Evaluation of Christian, Jewish and Zoroastrian Writings on Early Islam. Darwin Press.
- Macler, Frédéric (1904). "L'apocalypse arabe de Daniel: publiée, traduite et annotée". Revue de l'histoire des religions. 49: 265–305. (pp. 265–273 at JSTOR 23661535; 274–292 at JSTOR 23661536; 293–305 at JSTOR 23661537).
- Minov, Sergey (2019). "Syriac". In Alexander Kulik (ed.). A Guide to Early Jewish Texts and Traditions in Christian Transmission. Oxford University Press. pp. 95–137.
- Stone, Michael E. (1982). "The Metamorphosis of Ezra: Jewish Apocalypse and Medieval Vision". The Journal of Theological Studies. n.s. 33 (1): 1–18. JSTOR 23957555.
- Stone, Michael E. (1983). "Greek Apocalypse of Ezra (Second to Ninth Century A.D.): A New Translation and Introduction". In James H. Charlesworth (ed.). The Old Testament Pseudepigrapha. Vol. 1, Apocalyptic Literature and Testaments. Doubleday. pp. 561–579.
