= Erra =

Erra can refer to:

- Erra (god), a Babylonian god
- Erra, Portugal, a town in Coruche municipality, Portugal
- Erra, Estonia, a settlement in Sonda Parish, Ida-Viru County, Estonia
- Erra, the purported home planet of the pleiadean aliens described by ufologist Billy Meier
- Pizzo Erra, a mountain in Switzerland
- Giancarlo Erra, founder of the Italian rock band Nosound
- Erra-Pater, an astrologer
- Erra (band), an American metalcore band
  - Erra (album), their fifth studio album
- Erra (Kakatiya dynasty), a 10th century Indian ruler

ERRA may refer to:

- Enterprise and Regulatory Reform Act 2013
- Energy Regulators Regional Association
- Earthquake Reconstruction and Rehabilitation Authority
