= Esdras =

Title of various books by Ezra

The name "Esdras" is found in the title of four texts (entitled Ezra, Nehemiah, 1 Esdras, 2 Esdras in most English versions) attributed to, or associated with, the prophet Ezra. The naming convention of the four books of Esdras differs between church traditions, and has changed over time.

Esdras (Ancient Greek: Ἔσδρας) is a Greco-Latin variation of the Hebrew name "Ezra" (Hebrew: עזרא).

== Naming conventions ==
The books associated with Ezra are titled differently in different versions of the Bible. The following table summarizes the various names:

Overview of Biblical books named "Esdras"
#	Masoretic Hebrew	Most English versions (Note: Including KJB, RSV, NRSV, ESV, CEB, NEB, REB, and GNB)	Jerome's Vulgate	Clementine Vulgate, English Douay–Rheims	Vetus Latina	Septuagint (LXX)	Ethiopic version	Alternative names		
1	Ezra	Ezra	Ezra	1 Esdras	2 Esdras	Esdras B Ἔσδρας βʹ	1 Ezra	Ezra–Nehemiah		
2	Ezra	Nehemiah	Ezra	2 Esdras (Nehemias)	2 Esdras	Esdras B Ἔσδρας βʹ	1 Ezra	Ezra–Nehemiah		
3	absent	1 Esdras (Apocrypha)	absent	3 Esdras (Apocrypha)	1 Esdras	Esdras A Ἔσδρας α'	2 Ezra	Greek Esdras or 3 Ezra		
4	absent	2 Esdras (Apocrypha)	absent	4 Esdras (Apocrypha)	absent	absent	Ezra Sutuel	(Ch. 3–14)	4 Ezra or Jewish Apocalypse of Ezra or Apocalyptic Esdras	Latin Esdras
5	absent	2 Esdras (Apocrypha)	absent	4 Esdras (Apocrypha)	absent	absent	absent	(Ch. 1–2)	5 Ezra	Latin Esdras
6	absent	2 Esdras (Apocrypha)	absent	4 Esdras (Apocrypha)	absent	absent	absent	(Ch. 15–16)	6 Ezra	Latin Esdras

The Thirty-nine Articles that define the doctrines of the Church of England follow the naming convention of the Clementine Vulgate. Likewise, the Vulgate numbering is often used by modern scholars, who nevertheless use the name Ezra to avoid confusion with the Greek and Slavonic enumerations: 1 Ezra (Ezra), 2 Ezra (Nehemiah), 3 Ezra (Esdras A/1 Esdras), 4 Ezra (chapters 3–14 of 4 Esdras), 5 Ezra (chapters 1–2 of 4 Esdras) and 6 Ezra (chapters 15–16 of 4 Esdras). Otherwise, modern scholars sometimes apply the term 'Greek Esdras' for 3 Ezra, and 'Latin Esdras' for 4 Ezra, 5 Ezra and 6 Ezra together.

Ambrose of Milan referred to 1 Esdras as the 'first book of Esdras', Ezra–Nehemiah as the 'second book of Esdras', and 2 Esdras as the 'third book of Esdras'. Some English translations of the Septuagint, such as the New English Translation of the Septuagint, refer to Esdras A as 1 Esdras, and Esdras B (Ezra-Nehemiah) as 2 Esdras.

== Historical development ==
The two books universally considered canonical, Ezra and Nehemiah (lines 1 and 2 of the table above), originated in the Hebrew bible as one book titled Ezra (= Esdras).

Otherwise, however, early Christian citations of the 'Book of Ezra' without qualification commonly denote the alternative Greek translation of Ezra represented by 1 Esdras; so that when early Christian writers talk of 'two books of Ezra', it is 1 Esdras and Ezra–Nehemiah that are being identified, and surviving Old Latin biblical manuscripts include both books in that order as the "first" and "second" books of Ezra.

In the Greek canon, and in all surviving early Greek pandect bibles, 1 Esdras and Ezra–Nehemiah are termed Esdras A and Esdras B respectively. For Ambrose 1 Esdras was the 'first book of Esdras', Ezra–Nehemiah was the 'second book of Esdras', and 2 Esdras was the 'third book of Esdras'. When the Council of Carthage (397) and Synod of Hippo (393), under the influence of Augustine of Hippo, determined that only 'two books of Ezra' were to be considered canonical, it was both Ezra–Nehemiah and 1 Esdras which were stated as being included in scripture, while 2 Esdras was being excluded.

Jerome however, in his new Vulgate translation of the Old Testament directly from the Hebrew of the early 5th century BCE affirmed in his prologue to Ezra that there was only one canonical book of that title, corresponding to Hebrew Ezra–Nehemiah, while the "third and fourth books" of Ezra were apocryphal; and in all early manuscripts of the Vulgate (as with the 7th century CE Codex Amiatinus) this book is presented without division, and 1 Esdras and 2 Esdras are omitted. Jerome appears to have considered the two books of Ezra in the Old Latin - translating Greek Esdras A and Esdras B respectively - as "variant versions" of Ezra-Nehemiah, in which case his apocryphal "third and fourth books" correspond to the texts in 'Latin Esdras'. Jerome's practice is followed in the 9th century Vulgate bibles of Alcuin and Theodulf of Orleans, but from the 9th century CE onwards Vulgate manuscripts are found sporadically which split Ezra–Nehemiah into two books; and this becomes standard with the Paris Vulgate bibles of the 13th century while Greek Esdras and Latin Esdras also came to be included in the Paris bibles so that the Ezra portion becomes 1 Esdras, the Nehemiah portion becomes 2 Esdras, Greek Esdras becomes 3 Esdras and Latin Esdras becomes 4 Esdras. The naming conventions of the Paris bibles were taken over into the Clementine Vulgate. However, in the Stuttgart Vulgate, Ezra–Nehemiah is once again printed as a single text with the title 'Ezra', while (Clementine) 3 Esdras and 4 Esdras are in an appendix; named 3 Ezra and 4 Ezra respectively.

Since the English Reformation, most English translations have split the book of Ezra–Nehemiah under the titles 'Ezra' and 'Nehemiah'; while the Douay–Rheims version has followed the Clementine Vulgate.

Greek Esdras or 1 Esdras (line 3 of the table above) is the version of Ezra most commonly cited as scripture by early Christians, and consequently was included in the Old Testament in late 4th century CE Greek and Latin canon lists before Jerome; but with the increasing dominance of Jerome's Vulgate translation it dropped out of use in the West; although from the 13th century, it was commonly reintroduced under the title 3 Esdras. This Latin text of 3 Esdras is found in later medieval Vulgate manuscripts and the Sixto-Clementine Vulgate, and is however a completely different (and likely earlier) translation of Greek Esdras A from that found in the Old Latin, as witnessed in the Codex Colbertinus. Where the Vulgate text of 3 Esdras is woodenly literal in its rendering of the Greek, the Old Latin text of 'First Esdras' tends towards free paraphrase. The Douay–Rheims version followed the Clementine Vulgate title, while Protestant English versions chose a separate numbering for apocryphal books and called it 1 Esdras (using the Greek form to differentiate the apocryphal book from the canonical Ezra).

Latin Esdras or 2 Esdras (lines 4, 5 and 6 of the table above) is contained in some Latin bibles as 4 Esdras; and in some Slavonic manuscripts as 3 Esdras. Except for the Douay–Rheims version (which follows the Vulgate), most English versions containing this book call it 2 Esdras (again using the Greek form for the apocryphal book). The book is not included in the Greek Septuagint and no complete copy of the Greek text has survived, though it is quoted by the Church Fathers. Due to its apocalyptic content, the book (specifically as referring to chapters 3-14) has also been called Esdras the Prophet, Apocalyptic Esdras or The Jewish Apocalypse of Ezra. Because the most complete extant text is in Latin, the book is also called Latin Esdras.

The Latin version differs from other versions of 2 Esdras in that it contains additional opening and closing chapters, which are also called 5 Ezra and 6 Ezra by scholars.

== Other Ezra writings ==
Other books associated with Ezra are the Greek Apocalypse of Ezra, the Latin Vision of Ezra, the Armenian Questions of Ezra, the Syriac Apocalypse of Pseudo-Ezra, the Revelation of Ezra and the Ethiopic Apocalypse of Ezra.

== Canonicity ==
The Jewish canon considers the Book of Ezra–Nehemiah to be canonical. All Christians consider the separate books Book of Ezra and the Book of Nehemiah to be canonical. Jews, Roman Catholics, and Protestants do not generally recognize 1 Esdras and 2 Esdras as being canonical. Eastern Orthodox, following the Septuagint, generally consider Esdras A and Esdras B to be canonical, and do not recognize 2 Esdras. The Jewish Apocalypse of Ezra (2 Esdras), whose authorship is ascribed to Ezra, is canonical in the Syriac and Ethiopian traditions; and is included in the Apocrypha of the Armenian Church.
