= Triple-headed eagle =

Mythical creature and heraldic charge

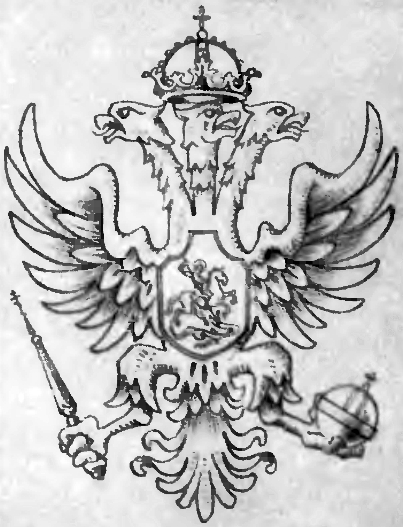
The triple-headed eagle design used by Michael I of Russia.

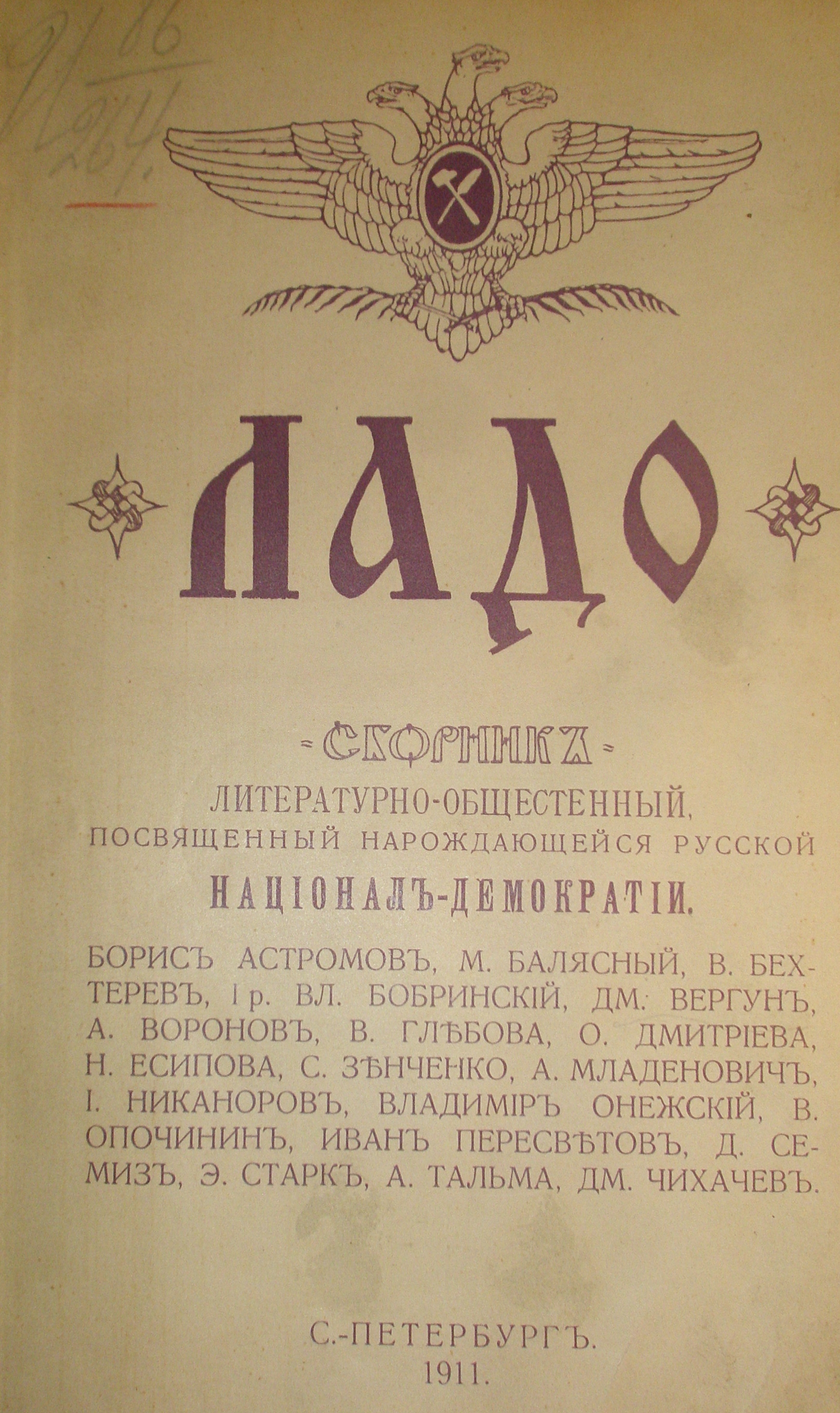
Title page of Lado (1911).

The three-headed eagle, also called triple-headed eagle, is a mythological or heraldic eagle, as it were an augmented version of the double-headed eagle.

A three-headed eagle is mentioned in the apocryphal Latin Ezra, featuring in a dream by the high priest Ezra. In a Chechen fairy tale, a three-headed eagle figures as a monstrous adversary to be killed by the hero. Öksökö (Өксөку) is the name of an eagle with either two or three heads in Yakut and Dolgan folklore.

Exceptionally, a three-headed eagle (or rather, an eagle with two additional heads mounted on the tips of its wings) is shown as the coat of arms of minnesinger Reinmar von Zweter (c. 1200–1248) in the Codex Manesse (c. 1300). An unrelated depiction of the Reichsadler with three heads is found in the Wappenbuch of Conrad Grünenberg (1483). A three-headed bird (not necessarily an eagle) is also found in the Middle Low German illustrated manuscript Splendor Solis, dated to the 1530s.

The sceptre of tsar Michael I of Russia was decorated with a three-headed eagle, and representations of the design are found in Russian symbolism. The literary anthology Lado, published in 1911, opens with a poem, "Slavic Eagle" (Славянский орел) by Dmitriy Vergun, in which the three heads are explained as representing the union of three races which contributed to the genesis of Russia, the "western" head representing the Varangians, the "eastern head" the Mongols, and the central head the Slavs.

The Three-Headed Eagle (1944) by A. Ferris discusses the destiny of the peoples of Europe based on the Latin Ezra.

== See also ==
- Avalerion
