= Ethiopic Apocalypse of Ezra =

Apocalypse written in Geʿez (Ethiopic)

Halévy's transcription of the start of the Apocalypse

The Ethiopic Apocalypse of Ezra, also called the Falasha Apocalypse of Ezra, is an apocalypse written in Geʿez (Ethiopic) that circulated among the Beta Israel (Falasha) and foretold the divine destruction of Islam.

== Textual history ==
The Apocalypse, or at least its second part, appears to be an original composition in Ethiopic. As it stands, it is a Jewish text with heavy Christian influences. For example, it calls the Messiah the Word and quotes from the New Testament. Richard Bauckham considers it "a de-christianized version of an originally Christian text", a view shared by Steven Kaplan.

The text begins, "This is what God said to Ezra." It is a piece of pseudepigrapha and not an authentic work of the biblical Ezra. It draws its inspiration and its view of Ezra as a prophet from the apocryphal book 4 Ezra. It also depends on the Book of Jubilees and 1 Enoch. New Testament books used include Matthew, 1 Corinthians and 1 Thessalonians.

Joseph Halévy acquired a manuscript from a Jewish debtera in 1867. It was considered a sacred text by the Beta Israel at the time. He published a transcription of the Ethiopic text with a French translation and an introduction. Two other manuscripts of the text are Ethiopic MSS 27.7 and 61.1 in the British Museum. A version can also be found in the collection of Jacques Faitlovitch, now in Tel Aviv. The questions of the provenance and date of the Apocalypse can only be answered after the publication of a critical edition.

== Synopsis ==
The Apocalypse has two clear parts. The first is an account of the last judgment and the resurrection of the dead in Jewish eschatology. It describes how Raphael will sound his trumpet and the dead will be raised to judgement. The just will see God's face and the wicked will be dragged by the angel Bernael to the throne of God, who will hand them over to Temlyakos, the angel of Gehenna.

The second part begins with Ezra fasting in the desert until Uriel gives him a drink like fire that reveals to him the future history of the world. This history is presented from creation until the end times, with special emphasis on the Ethiopian kings and the destruction of the Ishmaelites (Muslims) by the Messiah. Since the kings are unnamed and only initials are given, only King Lalibela (r. 1182–1225) is identifiable from reference to his rock-hewn churches.

Under Lalibela, there will be abundance and peace. Under his successor, Ye (perhaps Yetbarak or Na'akueto La'ab), there will be perjury, famine, pestilence and death. Slaves will be sold to the Ishmaelites, who will reign for 700 years until a son of a lion, the Messiah of the house of David, arises. He will lead the nine tribes that were exiled by King Shalmaneser V (according to 1 Kings), kill the Ishmaelites and reign for forty years. Then he will go into hiding. Gog and Magog and a certain Guga will rampage and a false messiah, the devil, will reign for three years, six months and three days before God strikes him down to Sheol.

Because of its concern with Muslim rule, Lisbeth Fried calls it "a polemic against the Muslim invasion" and a "political apocalypse". Its tone, however, is less strident than the comparable Syriac Apocalypse of Ezra.

== Bibliography ==
- Bauckham, Richard (2008). The Jewish World Around the New Testament. Mohr Siebeck.
- Bauckham, Richard (2013). "The Latin Vision of Ezra: A New Translation and Introduction". In Richard Bauckham; James Davila; Alex Panayotov (eds.). Old Testament Pseudepigrapha: More Noncanonical Scriptures. Vol. 1. William B. Eerdmans. pp. 498–528.
- Fried, Lisbeth S. (2014). Ezra and the Law in History and Tradition. University of South Carolina Press.
- Halévy, Joseph (1902). Te'ezaza Sanbat (Commandements du Sabbat). Librairie Émile Bouillon.
- James, Montague Rhodes (1895). "Introduction". The Fourth Book of Ezra. Cambridge University Press.
- Kaplan, Steven (1999). "The Literature of the Beta Israel (Falasha): A Survey of a Biblical-Hebraic Tradition". Христианский Восток [Xristianskij Vostok]. n.s. 1 (7): 99–123.
- Stone, Michael E. (1982). "The Metamorphosis of Ezra: Jewish Apocalypse and Medieval Vision". The Journal of Theological Studies. n.s. 33 (1): 1–18. doi:10.1093/jts/XXXIII.1.1. JSTOR 23957555.
- Stone, Michael E. (1983). "Greek Apocalypse of Ezra (Second to Ninth Century A.D.): A New Translation and Introduction". In James H. Charlesworth (ed.). The Old Testament Pseudepigrapha. Vol. 1, Apocalyptic Literature and Testaments. Doubleday. pp. 561–579.
