= Aker (angel) =

Aker is an angel mentioned in the Greek Apocalypse of Ezra whose name was revealed to Esdras as one of the nine angels who will govern "at the end of the world." The nine angels mentioned are: Michael, Gabriel, Uriel, Raphael, Gabuthelon, Aker, Arphugitonos, Beburos, and Zebuleon. Aker is not considered an archangel and is a non-canonical figure. Theologians surmise that Aker may be comparable to Kyr.

== See also ==
- List of angels in theology
