= Apocalypse of Sedrach =

Written between the 2nd and 5th centuries AD, in Greek, the Apocalypse of Sedrach, also known as the Word of Sedrach, is an ancient apocryphal text. It is preserved only in one 15th century manuscript (Bodleian Cod.Misc.Gr. 56, fols. 92–100). The text was published by M. R. James and translated into English by A. Rutherford. Apparently the original apocalypse was composed between AD 150 and 500, it was joined with a lengthy sermon on love to reach its final form shortly after AD 1000 (Agourides, 606). The original was probably Jewish, but this was later edited to take on a Christian flavour.

The name of the titular figure, Sedrach may simply be the Greek form of Shadrach, the name of one of the three individuals put into the fiery furnace in the Book of Daniel. It may however simply be a corruption of Esdras, the Greek form of Ezra, particularly since the text has much similarity with other apocryphal texts attributed to Ezra, such as the Apocalypse of Ezra.

Like much other apocalyptic literature, the text narrates how Sedrach was given a vision of heaven, first describing someone being sent by God take him there. In the Apocalypse of Sedrach, it is Jesus himself who comes to take Sedrach, but while the text seems superficially Christian, it appears to be a corruption of an earlier Jewish text, with Jesus simply having been substituted in place of the name of an archangel.

Unlike other apocalyptic texts, however, the Apocalypse of Sedrach heavily discusses ethical issues, particularly repentance, and God being merciful. In a marked contrast to the bitter attitude often expressed in the genre, God is depicted as patient, keen to help people make the right choices, and keen to allow them repentance at every opportunity.

== Sources ==
- S. Agourides (trans. & introduction), "Apocalypse of Sedrach", in J.H. Charlesworth (ed.), The Old Testament Pseudepigrapha (New York: Doubleday, 1983), 1.605-613.
- A. Rutherford, "The Apocalypse of Sedrach", Ante Nicene Fathers, vol10, 175–80. English Translation.
