= Revelation of Ezra =

The Revelation in a ninth-century manuscript

The Revelation of Ezra (Revelatio Esdrae) is a short Latin kalandologion, a type of almanac that gives meteorological, agricultural, economic and other predictions for any given year based on the day of the week on which it begins. It treats the kalends (first day) of January as the beginning of the year.

The Revelation was composed in Latin by an anonymous author in Western Europe or North Africa no later than the ninth century and possibly much earlier. It is preserved in three manuscripts of the ninth, twelfth and fifteenth centuries. It consists of an introductory sentence followed by seven paragraphs corresponding to the days of the week. It purports to be a "revelation which was made to Ezra and the children of Israel". The use of the phrase "Lord's Day" marks its real author as at least a nominal Christian, but there is no attempt in the text to provide a theological justification for its fatalism.

David Fiensy sees the pseudonym "Ezra" as chosen because of the popularity of 4 Ezra, but Jens Schröter places the Revelation in "an independent line of reception of the figure of Ezra with no relationship to the prophetic and apocalyptic writings" like 4 Ezra. The text does bear resemblance to the Jewish Treatise of Shem, which makes predictions for a year based on the sign of the zodiac at the start of the year. At a further remove is the Dead Sea scroll 4QCryptic, which predicts a person's physical characteristics from the zodiac at his birth. Other kalandologia identical in structure to the Revelation survive in both Latin and Greek.

The Latin text was published by Giovanni Mercati in 1901 on the basis of all three manuscripts. Fiensy has made an English translation based on the oldest manuscript.

== Bibliography ==
- Fiensy, D. A. (1983). "Revelation of Ezra". In James H. Charlesworth (ed.). The Old Testament Pseudepigrapha. Vol. 1, Apocalyptic Literature and Testaments. Doubleday. pp. 601–604.
- Fried, Lisbeth S. (2014). Ezra and the Law in History and Tradition. University of South Carolina.
- Matter, E. Ann (1982). "The Revelatio Esdrae in Latin and English Traditions". Revue bénédictine. 92: 376–392. doi:10.1484/J.RB.4.01043.
- Schröter, Jens (2021). "Ezra and his Visions: From Jewish Apocalypse to Medieval Tour of Hell". In Jens Schröter; Tobias Nicklas; Armand Puig i Tàrrech (eds.). Dreams, Visions, Imaginations: Jewish, Christian and Gnostic Views of the World to Come. De Gruyter. pp. 235–259. doi:10.1515/9783110714746-010.
- Stone, M. E. (1992). "Ezra, Revelation of". In David Noel Freedman (ed.). Anchor Bible Dictionary. Vol. 2. p. 730.
