= Frédéric Macler =

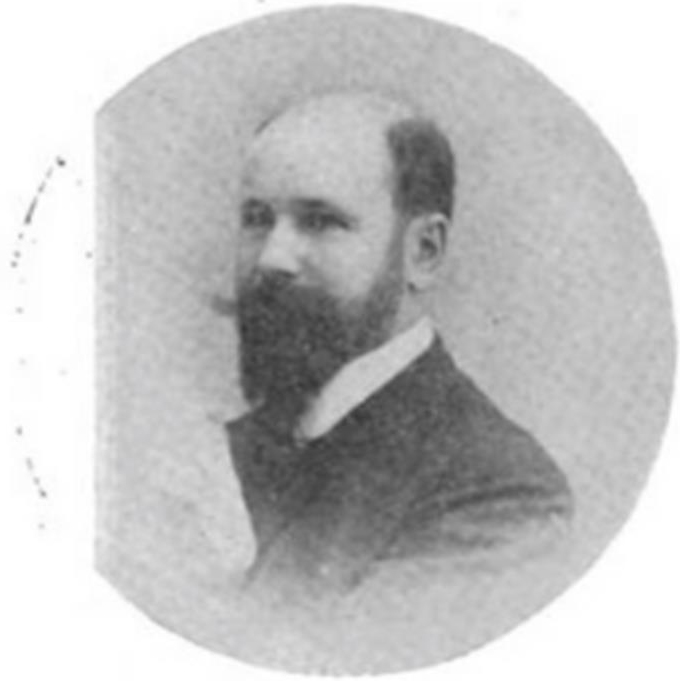
- Born: 26 May 1869; Mandeure, France
- Died: 12 July 1938 (aged 69); Montbéliard, France
- Occupations: Linguist, orientalist, translator

Frédéric Macler (26 May 1869 – 12 July 1938) was a French linguist, orientalist and translator.

A native of Mandeure, Macler learned Armenian, Assyrian, and Hebrew from Auguste Carrière. In 1911, he succeeded Antoine Meillet, as he took a chair in Armenian at the Institut national des langues et civilisations orientales, which he held until 1937. In 1919, he co-founded the Society for Armenian Studies. In 1920, he founded the Revue des Études Arméniennes, which he directed until 1933, with Antoine Meillet.

His works include a French translation of the Arabic Vision of Daniel.
