= Questions of Ezra =

The Questions of Ezra is an ancient Christian apocryphal text, claimed to have been written by the Biblical Ezra. The earliest surviving manuscript, composed in Armenian, dates from 1208 CE. It is an example of the Christian development of topics coming out from the Jewish Apocalyptic literature. Due to the shortness of the book, it is impossible to determine the original language, the provenance or to reliably date it. This text has had no influence outside the Armenian Apostolic Church.

Two recensions of this text are known: the longer, known as version A, was first published in 1896 by Yovsep'ianc, and translated into English in 1901 by Issaverdens and it is based on a manuscript dated 1208. The shorter recension B was published in 1978 by Stone. Version A is an Armenian witness based on a Mastoc (Ritual) which dates back to A.D. 1208, manuscript number 570, fols. 203r-206v of the Library of the Mechitarist Fathers in Venice. The writing is "a Christian composition clearly based on Jewish models."

The text can be related with 2 Esdras and with the Greek Apocalypse of Ezra. It is a dialogue between Ezra and an angel of the Lord about the fate of human souls after death. The text includes a description of the throne of God surrounded by the angelic host, though the impossibility of seeing the face of God is strongly emphasized. It also mentions the possibility of freeing souls from the hands of Satan by prayers in Church.
