= Ocidelus =

Character in the Greek version of the biblical Book of Ezra

Ocidelus (or Ocodelus in KJV) is a character in the Greek version of the biblical Book of Ezra. His name is given in the Codex Alexandrinus as Okeidelos (Ωκειδηλος); in the Codex Vaticanus Graecus 1209 and Henry Barclay Swete, as Okailedos (Ωκαιληδος); in the Fritzsche edition, Okodelos; and in the King James Version and Fritzsehe as Ocodelus.

Ocidelus was one of the sons of Phaisur, and a priest who had married a "strange wife" (1 Esdras 9:22). In the listing given in 1 Esdras, his name stands in the place of "Jozabad" in Ezra 10:22, and as such the International Standard Bible Encyclopedia suggests that this name is an apocryphal corruption.
