= Treatise of Shem =

The Treatise of Shem is a pseudepigraphon, likely written in the first century B.C.E, attributed to Shem, the son of Noah. This document is an example of a Kalandologion, and each of the twelve chapters correspond with a sign of the Zodiac, with the writer predicting what will occur if a year falls under a given sign. The text of the Treatise of Shem is preserved in a single fifteenth century Syriac manuscript, currently held at the John Rylands University Library. Alphonse Mingana was the first to translate the document in 1917, but it remained obscure until James H. Charlesworth, then associate professor at Duke University, discovered the treatise among a bundle of papers labeled "Aesthetica". Charlesworth initially believed the manuscript to be a medieval forgery, but upon closer examination determined it to be an authentic Jewish document dating to the Roman period.

== Structure ==
Each chapter of the Treatise of Shem corresponds with an astrological symbol:

- Chapter 1 - Aries
- Chapter 2 - Taurus
- Chapter 3 - Gemini
- Chapter 4 – Cancer
- Chapter 5 – Leo
- Chapter 6 – Virgo
- Chapter 7 – Libra
- Chapter 8 – Scorpio
- Chapter 9 – Sagittarius
- Chapter 10 – Capricorn
- Chapter 11 – Pisces
- Chapter 12 – Aquarius

The chapters follow an ascending order of positive outcomes, with the least beneficial sign being Aries, and the most beneficial being Pisces. The Treatise of Shem was originally ordered this way, but the scribe copying the manuscript skipped over Aquarius before inserting in at the end.
