= Vision of Ezra =

The Vision of Ezra (Latin: Visio Beati Esdrae, "Vision of the Blessed Ezra") is an ancient apocryphal text purportedly written by the biblical scribe Ezra. The earliest surviving manuscripts, composed in Latin, date to the 11th century AD, although textual peculiarities strongly suggest that the text was originally written in Greek. Like the Greek Apocalypse of Ezra, the work is clearly Christian, and features several apostles being seen in heaven. However, the text is significantly shorter than the Apocalypse.

The date of the original authorship of the work is unclear, with a range as wide as the 2nd to the 10th centuries. The general mood and zeitgeist of the work fit with Christian apocryphal works of the 3rd and 4th centuries for the best guess scholars have taken.

The text survives in seven Latin manuscripts which date from the eleventh to the thirteenth centuries.

They are:

- Vatican Library 3838 fols. 59^{a}-61^{a} (12th century);
- Heiligenkreuz, Codex 11, fols. 273^{b}-73^{a};
- Bibliothek des Priestseminars in Linz, MS AI/6 (Hs 1, 11th century);
- Klosterneuburg, Stiftsbibliothek, Codex 714, fols. 139^{ba}-41^{ba} (12th century);
- Lilienfeld, Stiftsbibliothek, Codex 145, fols. 70^{aa}-70^{bb} (13th century);
- Melk, Stiftsbibliothek, Codex 310.F.8, fols. 208^{b}-9^{b} (13th century);
- Lilienfeld, Stiftsbibliothek, Codex 134 Klein-Maria-Zell, fols. 109^{ab}-10^{aa} (13th century).

The text has a strong dependence on 2 Esdras, an earlier Apocalypse, and portrays God as answering the prayer of Ezra to have courage by sending him seven angels to show him heaven. In the Latin Vision of Esdras, Ezra walks down three floors or 72 steps and is shown hell. When arriving in hell, a soul approaches Esdras and says your coming here has granted us some respite. From there he is taken to the fourth underworld where the sinners are shown hanging by their eyelashes. The righteous he sees in heaven are portrayed as passing through a vast scene of flames and fire-breathing lions, unharmed. The wicked are also seen to be in heaven, but are quickly ripped apart by vicious dogs, and burnt in the fire. Ezra is told by a nearby angel that the crimes of the wicked were that "they denied the Lord, and sinned with women on the Lord’s Day".

Comparable New Testament verses can be found in Luke 16:22: that the beggar died, and was carried by the angels, and in Jesus' reference to the immortal worm in Mark 9:47–48: in hell, the worms that eat them do not die.
