= 1 Esdras =

Septuagint Book of Ezra

1 Esdras (Ancient Greek: Ἔσδρας Αʹ), also called Esdras A, Greek Esdras, Greek Ezra, or 3 Esdras, is the ancient Greek Septuagint version of the biblical Book of Ezra in use within the early church and among many modern Christians with varying degrees of canonicity. 1 Esdras is substantially similar to the standard Hebrew version of Ezra–Nehemiah, with the passages specific to the career of Nehemiah removed or re-attributed to Ezra, and some additional material.

As part of the Septuagint translation, it is regarded as canonical in the churches of the East, but apocryphal in the West, either presented in a separate section in Bibles or excluded altogether. For example, it is listed among the apocrypha in Article VI of the Thirty-Nine Articles of the Church of England. 1 Esdras is found in Origen's Hexapla. The Greek Septuagint, the Old Latin bible and related bible versions include both Esdras Αʹ (English title: 1 Esdras) and Esdras Βʹ (Ezra–Nehemiah), though as separate books.

There is scope for considerable confusion with references to 1 Esdras. The name refers primarily to translations of the original Greek 'Esdras A'. The Septuagint calls it Esdras A, and the Old Latin bible calls it 1 Esdras, while the Vulgate calls it 3 Esdras. It was considered apocryphal by Jerome.

== Contents ==
1 Esdras contains the whole of Ezra with the addition of one section; its verses are numbered differently. Just as Ezra begins with the last two verses of 2 Chronicles, 1 Esdras begins with the last two chapters, beginning with Josiah's celebration of the Passover; this suggests that Chronicles and Esdras may have been read as one book at some time in the past.

Ezra 4:6 includes a reference to a King Ahasuerus. Etymologically, Ahasuerus is the same as Xerxes, who reigned between Darius I and Artaxerxes I. In 1 Esdras, the section is reorganized, leading up to the additional section, and the reference to Ahasuerus is removed.

The additional section begins with a story known variously as the "Darius contest", the "Tale of the Three Guardsmen", or the "Story of the Three Youths", which was interpolated into 1 Esdras at 3:1 to 4:42. This section forms the core of 1 Esdras with Ezra 5, which together are arranged in a literary chiasm around the celebration in Jerusalem at the exiles' return. This chiastic core forms 1 Esdras into a complete literary unit, allowing it to stand independently from the Book of Nehemiah. Indeed, some scholars, such as W. F. Albright and Edwin M. Yamauchi, believe that Nehemiah came back to Jerusalem before Ezra.

EZRA AND I ESDRAS COMPARED
Masoretic Text	Septuagint	Summary
		Continuation of Paralipomenon i.e. "Things Set Off"
(2 Chronicles 35)	(I Esd. 1:1–33)	Reforms and final battle of King Josiah
(2 Chronicles 36)	(I Esd. 1:34–58)	Kings Jehoahaz, Jehoiakim, Jehoiachin and Zedekiah
		Begin Ezra
Ezr. 1	I Esd. 2:1–14	Cyrus's edict to rebuild the Temple
Ezr. 4:7–24	I Esd. 2:15–30a	A prolepsis or flash forward to Artaxerxes's reign
		Core: Chiasm of Celebration
—	I Esd. 2:30b	Inclusio: Work hindered until second year of Darius’s reign
—	I Esd. 3	A Feast in the court of Darius with Darius contest
—	I Esd. 4	B Darius vows to repatriate the exiles
—	I Esd. 5:1–6	X The feast of those who returned to Jerusalem
Ezr. 2	I Esd. 5:7–46	B' List of former exiles who returned
Ezr. 3	I Esd. 5:47–65	A' Feast of Tabernacles
Ezr. 4:1–5	I Esd. 5:66–73	Inclusio: Work hindered until second year of Darius’s reign
		Conclusion
Ezr. 5	I Esd. 6:1–22	The second year of Darius's reign
Ezr. 6	I Esd. 6:23 – 7:15	The temple is finished
Ezr. 7	I Esd. 8:1–27	Ezra's appointment and journey to Jerusalem
Ezr. 8	I Esd. 8:28–67	List of latter exiles who returned with Ezra
Ezr. 9	I Esd. 8:68–90	Repentance from miscegenation
Ezr. 10	I Esd. 8:91–9:36	Putting away of foreign wives and children
Nehemiah 7:73–8:12	I Esd. 9:37–55	The seventh month

== Author and criticism ==
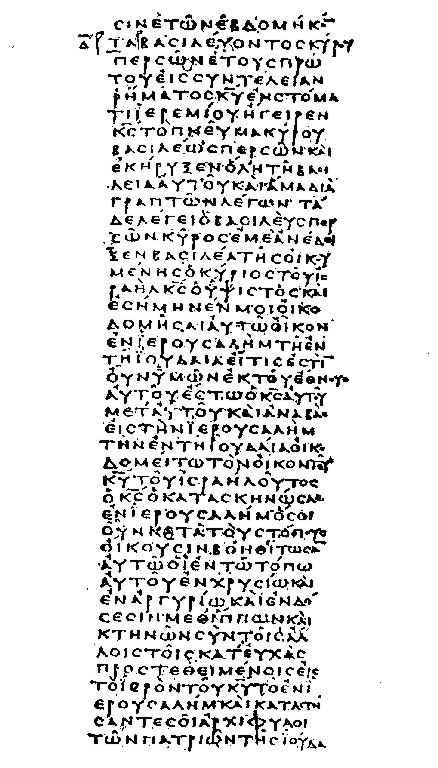
The Septuagint: A column of uncial text from 1 Esdras in the Codex Vaticanus, the basis of Sir Lancelot Charles Lee Brenton's Greek edition and English translation.

The purpose of the book seems to be retelling the Return to Zion in a way that it revolved around the story of the dispute among the courtiers, the 'Tale of the Three Guardsmen'. Since there are various discrepancies in the account, most scholars hold that the work was written by more than one author. However, some scholars believe that this work may have been the original, or at least the more authoritative. Most scholars agree that the original language of the work was Aramaic and Hebrew, with a few arguing for the originality of the Greek. The text contains similarities to the vocabulary in the Book of Daniel and II Maccabees, and it is presumed that the authors came either from Lower Egypt or Palestine and wrote during the Seleucid period. Assuming this theory is correct, many scholars consider the possibility that the book made use of an Aramaic chronicle.

Josephus makes use of 1 Esdras, which he treats as Scripture, while generally disregarding the canonical text of Ezra–Nehemiah. Some scholars believe that the composition is likely to have taken place in the second century BC. Many Protestant and Catholic scholars assign no historical value to the sections of the book not duplicated in Ezra–Nehemiah. The citations of the other books of the Bible, however, provide an early alternative to the Septuagint for those texts, which increases its value to scholars.

In the current Greek texts, the book breaks off in the middle of a sentence; that particular verse thus had to be reconstructed from an early Latin translation. However, it is generally presumed that the original work extended to the Feast of Tabernacles, as described in Nehemiah 8:13–18. An additional difficulty with the text appears to readers who are unfamiliar with chiastic structures common in Semitic literature. If the text is assumed to be a Western-style, purely linear narrative, then Artaxerxes seems to be mentioned before Darius, who is mentioned before Cyrus. (Such jumbling of the order of events, however, is also presumed by some readers to exist in the canonical Ezra and Nehemiah.) The Semitic chiasm is corrected in at least one manuscript of Josephus in the Antiquities of the Jews, Book 11, chapter 2 where we find that the name of the above-mentioned Artaxerxes is called Cambyses.

Some scholars, including Joseph Blenkinsopp in his 1988 commentary on Ezra–Nehemiah, hold that the book is a late 2nd/early 1st century BC revision of Esdras and Esdras β, while others such as L. L. Grabbe believe it to be independent of the Hebrew-language Ezra–Nehemiah.

== Christian canonical status and use ==
The book was widely quoted by early Christian authors and it found a place in Origen's Hexapla.

In early Latin traditions, Ezra, Nehemiah, 1 Esdras and 2 Esdras were known, respectively, as 1 Esdras, 2 Esdras, 3 Esdras (‘the Greek Esdras’) and 4 Esdras.

In the Vulgate, I Esdras is considered to be Ezra, II Esdras to be Nehemiah, III Esdras to be 1 Esdras, and IV Esdras to be 2 Esdras. For Jerome, III Esdras and IV Esdras were apocryphal. As Jerome's Vulgate version of the Bible gradually achieved dominance in Western Christianity, III Esdras no longer circulated. From the 13th century onwards, Vulgate Bibles produced in Paris reintroduced a Latin text of 1 Esdras, in response to commercial demand. However, the use of the book continued in the Eastern Church, and it remains a part of the Eastern Orthodox canon.

At the Council of Trent, only 3 bishops voted for an explicit rejection of the books of Esdras; the overwhelming majority "withheld any explicit decision on these books": thus "the question of Esdras' canonical status was left theoretically open". Catholic theologians and apologists disagree, but some argue that these books could theoretically be added as "tritiocanonical" books by the Catholic Magisterium at a later time, most likely related to union with one or more of the churches who already hold these books to be canonical.

In the Roman rite liturgy, 1 Esdras is used in the Missal of 1962 in the offertory prayer of a Votive Mass for the election of a Pope.

Non participentur sancta, donec exsurgat póntifex in ostensiónem et veritátem
("Let them not take part in the holy things, until there arise a priest unto showing and truth.") (3 Esdras 5:40). (Note: This missal referred to 1 Esdras as 3 Esdras, based on the Vulgate numbering)

== Nomenclature ==
The book normally called 1 Esdras is numbered differently among various versions of the Bible. In most editions of the Septuagint, the book is titled in Greek: Ἔσδρας Αʹ and is placed before the single book of Ezra–Nehemiah, which is titled in Greek: Ἔσδρας Βʹ.

1 Esdras is called 3 Esdras in the Latin Vulgate, which was translation from the Greek version of the Septuagint called Esdras A.

The Vulgate denoted 1 Esdras (Ezra) and 2 Esdras (Nehemiah) respectively. Vulgate Bible editions of the 13th century, and in what later became the usage of the Clementine Vulgate and the Anglican Articles of Religion, the Book of Ezra is applied to '1 Esdras'; while the Book of Nehemiah corresponds to '2 Esdras'; Esdras 1 (Esdras A in the Septuagint) corresponds to 3 Esdras and finally 2 Esdras, an additional work associated with the name Ezra, is denoted '4 Esdras' (It is called '2 Esdras' in the King James Version and in most modern English bibles). 3 Esdras continues to be accepted as canonical by Eastern Orthodoxy and the Ethiopian Orthodox Tewahedo Church, with 4 Esdras varying in canonicity between particular denominations within the Eastern churches.

The Slavonic Bible refers to this book as 2 Esdras, the Romanian Synodal Version refers to it as III Ezdra, and the Ethiopic Bible calls it "Ezra Kali", i.e. "2 Ezra".

Overwhelmingly, citations in early Christian writings claimed from the scriptural 'Book of Ezra' (without any qualification) are taken from 1 Esdras, and never from the 'Ezra' sections of Ezra–Nehemiah (Septuagint 'Esdras B'), the majority of early citations being taken from the 1 Esdras section containing the 'Tale of the Three Guardsmen', which is interpreted as Christological prophecy.

The King James Version and many successive English translations, including the RSV, NRSV, NEB, REB, and GNB, refer to "1 Esdras". The Clementine Vulgate and its derivative translations refer to 3 Esdras.

== See also ==
- Esdras
- 2 Esdras
- Deuterocanonical books in Eastern Orthodoxy
- Septuagint
- Ocidelus

== Notes ==
Deuterocanon
Preceded by 1–2 Chronicles	E. Orthodox; Books of the Bible	Succeeded by Ezra–Nehemiah (2 Esdras)
