= Pizzo Erra =

Mountain of the Swiss Lepontine Alps

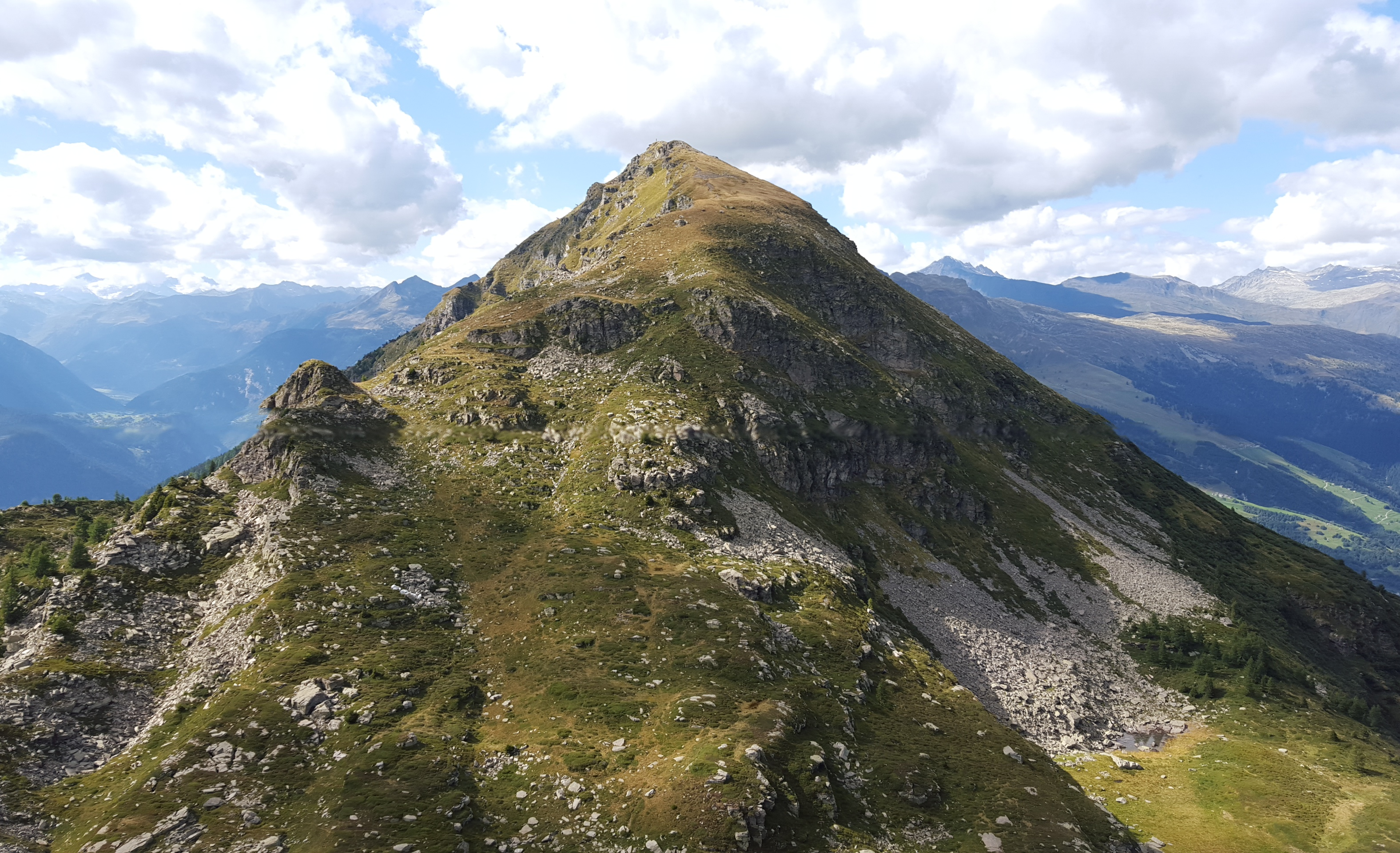

Highest point
- Elevation: 2,416 m (7,927 ft)
- Prominence: 300 m (980 ft)
- Parent peak: Piz Gannaretsch
- Coordinates: 46°26′27.9″N 8°53′27.4″E

Geography
- Location within Switzerland
- Location: Ticino, Switzerland
- Parent range: Lepontine Alps

Pizzo Erra is a mountain of the Lepontine Alps, located in the Swiss canton of Ticino. It is located south of the pass of Basso di Nara, on the subrange that separates the main valley of Leventina from the valley of Blenio. At 2,416 metres (7,927 ft) above sea level, its summit can be accessed with trails from both western and eastern side.

A re-vegetation project was used to "improve slope stability" for Pizzo Erra.
