= Pseudepigrapha =

Falsely attributed works

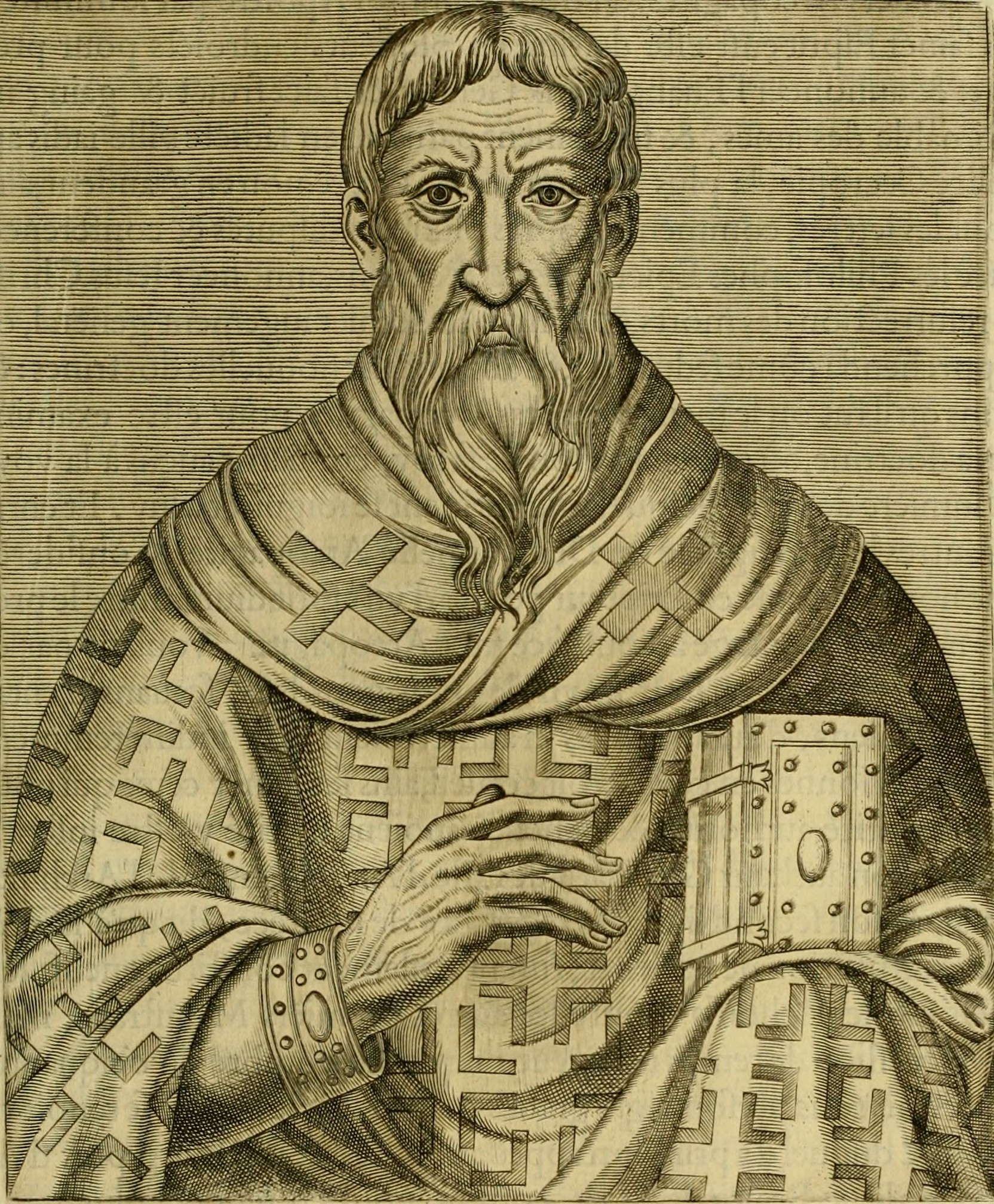
Pseudo-Dionysius the Areopagite (1584), by André Thevet.

A pseudepigraphon (also anglicized as pseudepigraph) is a falsely attributed work, a text whose claimed author is not the true author, or a work whose real author attributed it to a figure of the past. The name of the author to whom the work is falsely attributed is often prefixed with the particle "pseudo-", such as for example "pseudo-Aristotle" or "pseudo-Dionysius": these terms refer to the anonymous authors of works falsely attributed to Aristotle and Dionysius the Areopagite, respectively.

In biblical studies, the term pseudepigrapha can refer to an assorted collection of Jewish religious works thought to be written c. 300 BCE to 300 CE. They are distinguished by Protestants from the deuterocanonical books (Catholic and Orthodox) or Apocrypha (Protestant), the books that appear in extant copies of the Septuagint in the fourth century or later and the Vulgate, but not in the Hebrew Bible or in Protestant Bibles. The Catholic Church distinguishes only between the deuterocanonical and all other books; the latter are called biblical apocrypha, which in Catholic usage includes the pseudepigrapha. In addition, two books considered canonical in the Orthodox Tewahedo churches, the Book of Enoch and Book of Jubilees, are categorized as pseudepigrapha from the point of view of Chalcedonian Christianity.

In addition to the sets of generally agreed to be non-canonical works, scholars will also apply the term to canonical works who make a direct claim of authorship, yet this authorship is doubted. For example, the Book of Daniel is considered by scholars to have been written in the 2nd century BCE, 400 years after the prophet Daniel supposedly lived, and thus the work is pseudepigraphic. A New Testament example might be the book of 2 Peter, considered by some to be written approximately 80 years after Saint Peter's death. Early Christians, such as Origen, harbored doubts as to the authenticity of the book's authorship.

The term has also been used by Quranist Muslims to describe hadiths: Quranists claim that most hadiths are fabrications created in the 8th and 9th century CE, and falsely attributed to the Islamic prophet Muhammad.

== Etymology ==
The word pseudepigraph (from the Greek: ψευδής, pseudḗs, "false" and ἐπιγραφή, epigraphḗ, "name" or "inscription" or "ascription"; thus when taken together it means "false superscription or title"; see the related epigraphy). The plural of "pseudepigraph" (sometimes Latinized as "pseudepigraphon" or "pseudepigraphum") is "pseudepigrapha".

== Naming ==
When a text is shown to have been falsely attributed to a particular author, and the true identity of the author is not known, the author can be referred to by a combination of pseudo- and the traditional author's name. For example, the Armenian History has been falsely attributed to an Armenian historian named seventh-century Sebeos, and it is therefore called Pseudo-Sebeos.

== Levels of authenticity ==
Scholars have identified seven levels of authenticity which they have organized in a hierarchy ranging from literal authorship, meaning written in the author's own hand, to outright forgery:

1. Literal authorship. A church leader writes a letter in his own hand.
2. Dictation. A church leader dictates a letter almost word for word to an amanuensis.
3. Delegated authorship. A church leader describes the basic content of an intended letter to a disciple or to an amanuensis.
4. Posthumous authorship. A church leader dies, and his disciples finish a letter that he had intended to write, sending it posthumously in his name.
5. Apprentice authorship. A church leader dies, and disciples who had been authorized to speak for him while he was alive continue to do so by writing letters in his name years or decades after his death.
6. Honorable pseudepigraphy. A church leader dies, and admirers seek to honor him by writing letters in his name as a tribute to his influence and in a sincere belief that they are responsible bearers of his tradition.
7. Forgery. A church leader obtains sufficient prominence that, either before or after his death, people seek to exploit his legacy by forging letters in his name, presenting him as a supporter of their own ideas.

== Classical and biblical studies ==
=== Old Testament and intertestamental studies ===
In biblical studies, pseudepigrapha refers particularly to works which purport to be written by noted authorities in either the Old and New Testaments or by persons involved in Jewish or Christian religious study or history. These works can also be written about biblical matters, often in such a way that they appear to be as authoritative as works which have been included in the many versions of the Judeo-Christian scriptures. Eusebius indicates this usage dates back at least to Serapion of Antioch, whom Eusebius records as having said: "But those writings which are falsely inscribed with their name (ta pseudepigrapha), we as experienced persons reject..."

Many such works were also referred to as Apocrypha, which originally connoted "private" or "non-public": those that were not endorsed for public reading in the liturgy. An example of a text that is both apocryphal and pseudepigraphical is the Odes of Solomon. It is considered pseudepigraphical because it was not actually written by Solomon but instead is a collection of early Christian (first to second century) hymns and poems, originally written not in Hebrew, and apocryphal because they were not accepted in either the Tanakh or the New Testament.

There is a tendency not to use the word pseudepigrapha when describing works later than about 300 CE when referring to biblical matters. But the late-appearing Gospel of Barnabas, Apocalypse of Pseudo-Methodius, the Pseudo-Apuleius (author of a fifth-century herbal ascribed to Apuleius), and the author traditionally referred to as the "Pseudo-Dionysius the Areopagite", are classic examples of pseudepigraphy. In the fifth century the moralist Salvian published Contra avaritiam ("Against avarice") under the name of Timothy; the letter in which he explained to his former pupil, Bishop Salonius, his motives for so doing survives.

The term pseudepigrapha is also commonly used to describe numerous works of Jewish religious literature written from about 300 BCE to 300 CE. Not all of these works are actually pseudepigraphical. It also refers to books of the New Testament canon whose authorship is misrepresented. Such works include the following:

- 3 Maccabees
- 4 Maccabees
- Assumption of Moses
- Ethiopic Book of Enoch (1 Enoch)
- Slavonic Second Book of Enoch
- Book of Jubilees
- 3 Baruch
- Letter of Aristeas
- Life of Adam and Eve
- Ascension of Isaiah
- Psalms of Solomon
- Sibylline Oracles
- 2 Baruch
- Testaments of the Twelve Patriarchs
- 4 Ezra
- Apocalypse of Abraham

Various canonical works accepted as scripture have since been reexamined and considered by modern scholars in the 19th century onward as likely cases of pseudepigraphica. The Book of Daniel directly claims to be written by the prophet Daniel, yet there are strong reasons to believe it was not written until centuries after Daniel's death, such as references to the book only appearing from the 2nd century BCE onward. The book is an apocalypse wherein Daniel offers a series of predictions of the future, and is meant to reassure the Jews of the period that the tyrant Antiochus IV Epiphanes would soon be overthrown. By backdating the book to the 6th century BCE and providing a series of correct prophecies as to the history of the past 400 years, the authorship claim of Daniel would have strengthened a later author's predictions of the coming fall of the Seleucid Empire.

=== New Testament studies ===
Christian scholars traditionally maintain that nothing known to be pseudepigraphical was admitted to the New Testament canon.

The Catholic Encyclopedia notes:

The first four historical books of the New Testament are supplied with titles, which however ancient, do not go back to the respective authors of those sacred texts. The Canon of Muratori, Clement of Alexandria, and St. Irenaeus bear distinct witness to the existence of those headings in the latter part of the second century of our era. Indeed, the manner in which Clement (Strom. I, xxi), and St. Irenaeus (Adv. Haer. III, xi, 7) employ them implies that, at that early date, our present titles to the gospels had been in current use for some considerable time. Hence, it may be inferred that they were prefixed to the evangelical narratives as early as the first part of that same century. That however, they do not go back to the first century of the Christian era, or at least that they are not original, is a position generally held at the present day. It is felt that since they are similar for the four Gospels, although the same Gospels were composed at some interval from each other, those titles were not framed and consequently not prefixed to each individual narrative, before the collection of the four Gospels was actually made. Besides as well pointed out by Prof. Bacon, "the historical books of the New Testament differ from its apocalyptic and epistolary literature, as those of the Old Testament differ from its prophecy, in being invariably anonymous, and for the same reason. Prophecies, whether in the earlier or in the later sense, and letters, to have authority, must be referable to some individual; the greater his name, the better. But history was regarded as common possession. Its facts spoke for themselves. Only as the springs of common recollection began to dwindle, and marked differences to appear between the well-informed and accurate Gospels and the untrustworthy ... become worth while for the Christian teacher or apologist to specify whether the given representation of the current tradition was 'according to' this or that special compiler, and to state his qualifications". It thus appears that the present titles of the Gospels are not traceable to the Evangelists themselves.

However, agnostic biblical scholar Bart D. Ehrman holds that only seven of Paul's epistles are convincingly genuine, and that all of the other 20 books in the New Testament appear to be written by unknown people who were not the well-known biblical figures to whom the early Christian leaders originally attributed authorship. The earliest and best manuscripts of Matthew, Mark, Luke, and John were all written anonymously. Furthermore, the books of Acts, Hebrews, 1 John, 2 John, and 3 John were also written anonymously.

Dale Martin taught that the four canonical gospels are anonymous, but not pseudonymous.

==== Pauline epistles ====
Thirteen New Testament letters are attributed to Paul and are still considered by Christians to carry Paul's authority. These letters are part of the Christian Bible and are foundational for the Christian Church. Therefore, letters which some claim to be pseudepigraphic are not considered any less valuable to Christians.

Authorship of 6 out of the 13 canonical epistles of Paul has been questioned by both Christian and non-Christian biblical scholars. These are the Epistle to the Ephesians, Epistle to the Colossians, Second Epistle to the Thessalonians, First Epistle to Timothy, Second Epistle to Timothy, and Epistle to Titus. These six books are referred by skeptical scholars such as Bart Ehrman as "deutero-Pauline letters", meaning "secondary" standing in the corpus of Paul's writings, on the grounds of proposed evidence that they could not have been written by Paul, despite internal attribution to Paul. Those known as the "Pastoral Epistles" (Timothy, 2 Timothy, and Titus) are all so similar that they are thought to be written by the same unknown author, either by Paul or in Paul's name.

==== Catholic epistles ====
Seven New Testament letters are attributed to several apostles, such as Saint Peter, John the Apostle, and Jesus's brothers James and Jude.

Three of the seven letters are anonymous. These three have traditionally been attributed to John the Apostle, the son of Zebedee and one of the Twelve Apostles of Jesus. Consequently, these letters have been labelled the Johannine epistles, despite the fact that none of the epistles mentions any author. Some modern scholars believe the author is not John the Apostle, but there is no scholarly consensus for any particular historical figure. (see: Authorship of the Johannine works).

Two of the letters are attributed to Simon Peter, one of the Twelve Apostles of Jesus. Therefore, they have traditionally been called the Petrine epistles. However, most modern scholars agree the second epistle was probably not written by Peter, arguing it has been written in the early 2nd century, long after Peter had died. Yet, opinions on the first epistle are more divided; many scholars do think this letter is authentic.

In one epistle, the author refers to himself only as James (Ἰάκωβος Iákobos). There are several different traditional Christian interpretations of other New Testament texts which mention a James, brother of Jesus. However, some modern scholars tend to reject this line of reasoning, since the author himself does not explicitly indicate any familial relationship with Jesus. A similar problem presents itself with the Epistle of Jude (Ἰούδας Ioudas): the writer names himself a brother of James (ἀδελφὸς δὲ Ἰακώβου adelphos de Iakóbou), but it is not clear which James is meant. According to some Christian traditions, this is the same James as the author of the Epistle of James, a brother of Jesus; and so, this Jude would also be a brother of Jesus.

=== Later pseudepigrapha ===
The Gospel of Peter and the attribution to Paul of the Epistle to the Laodiceans are both examples of pseudepigrapha that were excluded from the New Testament canon. They are often referred to as New Testament apocrypha. Further examples of New Testament pseudepigrapha include the Gospel of Barnabas and the Gospel of Judas, which begins by presenting itself as "the secret account of the revelation that Jesus spoke in conversation with Judas Iscariot".

The Vision of Ezra is an ancient apocryphal text purportedly written by the biblical scribe Ezra. The earliest surviving manuscripts, composed in Latin, date to the 11th century CE, although textual peculiarities strongly suggest that the text was originally written in Greek. Like the Greek Apocalypse of Ezra, the work is clearly Christian, and features several apostles being seen in heaven. However, the text is significantly shorter than the Apocalypse.

The Donation of Constantine is a forged Roman imperial decree by which the 4th-century emperor Constantine the Great supposedly transferred authority over Rome and the western part of the Roman Empire to the Pope. Composed probably in the 8th century, it was used, especially in the 13th century, in support of claims of political authority by the papacy. Lorenzo Valla, an Italian Catholic priest and Renaissance humanist, is credited with first exposing the forgery with solid philological arguments in 1439–1440, although the document's authenticity had been repeatedly contested since 1001.

In Russian history, in 1561 Muscovites supposedly received a letter from the Patriarch of Constantinople which asserted the right of Ivan the Terrible to claim the title of Tsar. This, too, turned out to be false. While earlier Russian Monarchs had on some occasions used the title "Tsar", Ivan the Terrible previously known as "Grand Prince of all the Russias" was the first to be formally crowned as Tsar of All Rus (Russian: Царь Всея Руси). This was related to Russia's growing ambitions to become an Orthodox "Third Rome", after the Fall of Constantinople – for which the supposed approval by the Patriarch added weight.

The Anaphorae of Mar Nestorius, employed in the Eastern Churches, is attributed to Nestorius, but its earliest manuscripts are in Syriac, which question its Greek authorship.

=== The Zohar ===
The Zohar (Hebrew: זֹהַר, lit. Splendor or Radiance), foundational work in the literature of Jewish mystical thought known as Kabbalah, first appeared in Spain in the 13th century, and was published by a Jewish writer named Moses de León. De León ascribed the work to Shimon bar Yochai ("Rashbi"), a rabbi of the 2nd century during the Roman persecution who, according to Jewish legend, hid in a cave for thirteen years studying the Torah and was inspired by the prophet Elijah to write the Zohar. This accords with the traditional claim by adherents that Kabbalah is the concealed part of the Oral Torah. Modern academic analysis of the Zohar, such as that by the 20th century religious historian Gershom Scholem, has theorized that de León was the actual author, as textual analysis points to a Medieval Spanish Jewish writer rather than one living in Roman-ruled Palestine.

=== Ovid ===
Conrad Celtes, a noted German humanist scholar and poet of the German Renaissance, collected numerous Greek and Latin manuscripts in his function as librarian of the Imperial Library in Vienna. In a 1504 letter to the Venetian publisher Aldus Manutius Celtes claimed to have discovered the missing books of Ovid's Fasti. However, it turned out that the purported Ovid verses had actually been composed by an 11th-century monk and were known to the Empire of Nicaea according to William of Rubruck. Even so, many contemporary scholars believed Celtes and continued to write about the existence of the missing books until well into the 17th century.

== As a literary device ==
Pseudepigraphy has been employed as a metafictional technique. Authors who have made notable use of this device include James Hogg (The Private Memoirs and Confessions of a Justified Sinner), Thomas Carlyle (Sartor Resartus), Jorge Luis Borges ("An Examination of the Works of Herbert Quain"; "Pierre Menard, Author of the Quixote"), Vladimir Nabokov (Pale Fire), Stanislaw Lem (A Perfect Vacuum; Imaginary Magnitude) Roberto Bolaño (Nazi Literature in the Americas) and Stefan Heym (The Lenz Papers).

Edgar Rice Burroughs also presented many of his works – including the most well-known, the Tarzan books – as pseudepigrapha, prefacing each book with a detailed introduction presenting the supposed actual author, with Burroughs himself pretending to be no more than the literary editor. J.R.R. Tolkien in The Lord of the Rings presents that story and The Hobbit as translated from the fictional Red Book of Westmarch written by characters within the novels. The twelve books of The Flashman Papers series by George MacDonald Fraser similarly pretend to be transcriptions of the papers left by an "illustrious Victorian soldier", each volume prefaced by a long semi-scholarly Explanatory Note stating that "additional packets of Flashman's papers have been found and are here presented to the public". A similar device was used by Ian Fleming in The Spy Who Loved Me and by various other writers of popular fiction.

== See also ==
- Criticism of Mormon sacred texts
- Found manuscript
- Journal for the Study of the Pseudepigrapha
- List of Old Testament pseudepigrapha
- Literary forgery
- Modern pseudepigrapha

== Sources ==
- Cueva, Edmund P.; Martínez, Javier, eds. (2016). Splendide Mendax: Rethinking Fakes and Forgeries in Classical, Late Antique, and Early Christian Literature. Groningen: Barkhuis.
- DiTommaso, Lorenzo (2001). A Bibliography of Pseudepigrapha Research 1850–1999. Sheffield: Sheffield Academic Press.
- Ehrman, Bart (2013). Forgery and Counterforgery: The Use of Literary Deceit in Early Christian Polemics. Oxford: Oxford University Press.
- Fritz, Kurt von, ed. (1972). Pseudepigraphica 1. Geneva: Foundation Hardt. — Contributions on pseudopythagorica (the literature ascribed to Pythagoras), the Platonic Epistles, Jewish-Hellenistic literature, and the characteristics particular to religious forgeries
- Kiley, Mark (1986). Colossians as Pseudepigraphy. Bible Seminar. Vol. 4. Sheffield: JSOT Press. — Colossians as a non-deceptive school product
- Metzger, Bruce M. (1972). "Literary forgeries and canonical pseudepigrapha". Journal of Biblical Literature. 91 (1): 3–24. doi:10.2307/3262916. JSTOR 3262916.
