= Erra Pater =

Author of an astrological almanac in 1535

Erra Pater is the assumed name of the author of an astrological almanac first published in 1535, and referred to by Samuel Butler in Hudibras (I.i), and by William Congreve in Love for Love.
