= Greek Apocalypse of Ezra =

2nd-9th century Greek pseudepigraphal work

The Greek Apocalypse of Ezra, also known as the Word and Revelation of Esdras, is a pseudepigraphal work written in the name of the biblical scribe Ezra. It survived in only two Greek copies and is dated between the 2nd century and the 9th century AD.

According to R. H. Charles, the text of the Greek Apocalypse of Ezra was influenced by the book of 2 Esdras. The extant version of the Greek Apocalypse is thought to have undergone extensive reworking, if not having been totally written by, Christian editors, mentioning the Apostles Paul and John, King Herod, etc.

The nine angels mentioned are: Michael, Gabriel, Uriel, Raphael, Gabuthelon, Aker, Arphugitonos, Beburos, and Zebuleon.

Like much apocalyptic literature, the Apocalypse of Ezra portrays its author as being granted visions of Heaven and of the Gehenna of fire, where the punishments meted out to sinners are witnessed in detail. Ezra is first described as visiting Heaven, where Ezra raises a question of theodicy — he asks God why humans were given the ability to sin. Although God argues that humans are to blame if they do sin, due to their having free will, the text has Ezra respond that ultimately the fall of man must be up to God, particularly since God created both Eve and the Serpent and the forbidden tree. Ezra goes on to accuse God of having an appalling idea of justice, to which God does not respond, even when Ezra petitions on behalf of sinners. After his petitions and argument with God, Ezra is shown a vision of the tortures in the Gehenna of fire, as well as the Antichrist. Finally, when Ezra protests that no one is without sin and hence none will escape such torture, God reveals that he endured the cross in order to save mankind, forgive those who believe, and vanquish death.
