= 2 Esdras =

Apocalyptic appendix to Vulgate (70-218 CE)

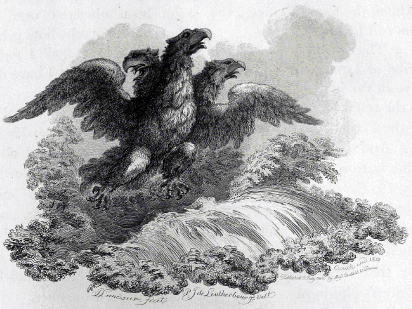
Illustration of the triple-headed eagle from Ezra's vision (head-piece from Bowyer Bible, Apocrypha, 1815)

2 Esdras, also called 4 Esdras, Latin Esdras, or Latin Ezra, is an apocalyptic book in some English versions of the Bible. (Note: Among many, the KJB, RSV, NRSV, NEB, REB, and GNB. More in naming conventions.) (Note: 4 Ezra is the title used in modern English translations as in Charlesworth's.) Tradition ascribes it to Ezra, a scribe and priest of the fifth century BC, whom the book identifies with the sixth-century figure Shealtiel.

2 Esdras forms a part of the canon of Scripture in the Ethiopian Orthodox Church (an Oriental Orthodoxy body), though it is reckoned among the apocrypha by Catholics and Protestants. Within Eastern Orthodoxy it forms a part of the canon but its usage varies by tradition. 2 Esdras was translated by Jerome as part of the Vulgate, though he placed it in an appendix.

== Naming conventions ==
As with 1 Esdras, some confusion exists about the numbering of this book. The Vulgate of Jerome includes only a single book of Ezra, but in the Clementine Vulgate, 1, 2, 3 and 4 Esdras are separate books. Protestant writers, after the Geneva Bible, called 1 and 2 Esdras of the Vulgate Ezra and Nehemiah, respectively, and called 3 and 4 Esdras of the Vulgate 1 Esdras and 2 Esdras, respectively. These then became the common names for these books in English Bibles.

Medieval Latin manuscripts denoted it 4 Esdras, which to this day is the name used for chapters 3–14 in modern critical editions, which are typically in Latin, the language of its most complete exemplars.

It appears in the Appendix to the Old Testament in the Slavonic Bible, where it is called 3 Esdras, and the Georgian Orthodox Bible numbers it 3 Ezra. This text is sometimes also known as Apocalypse of Ezra — chapters 3–14 known as the Jewish Apocalypse of Ezra or 4 Ezra; in modern critical editions, chapters 1–2 are named as 5 Ezra, and chapters 15–16 as 6 Ezra.

Bogaert speculates that the "fourth book of Ezra" referred to by Jerome most likely corresponds to modern 5 Ezra and 6 Ezra combined, and notes a number of Latin manuscripts where these chapters are together in an appendix.

== Contents ==
=== 5 Ezra ===
The first two chapters of 2 Esdras are found only in the Latin version of the book, and are called 5 Ezra by scholars. They are considered by most scholars to be Christian in origin; they assert God's rejection of the Jews and describe a vision of the Son of God. These are generally considered to be late additions (possibly third century) to the work.

=== 4 Ezra ===
Chapters 3–14, or the great bulk of 2 Esdras, is a Jewish apocalypse, also sometimes known as 4 Ezra or the Jewish Apocalypse of Ezra. The latter name should not be confused with a later work called the Greek Apocalypse of Ezra.

The Ethiopian Church considers 4 Ezra to be canonical, written during the Babylonian captivity, and calls it Izra Sutuel (ዕዝራ ሱቱኤል). It was also often cited by the Fathers of the Church. In the Eastern Armenian tradition, it is called 3 Ezra. It was possibly written in the late first century CE following the destruction of the Second Temple.

Among Greek Fathers of the Church, 4 Ezra is generally cited as Προφήτης Ἔσδρας Prophetes Esdras ("The Prophet Ezra") or Ἀποκάλυψις Ἔσδρα Apokalupsis Esdra ("Apocalypse of Ezra"). Most scholars agree that 4 Ezra was composed in Hebrew, which was translated into Greek, and then to Latin, Armenian, Ethiopian, and Georgian, but the Hebrew and Greek editions have been lost.

Slightly differing Latin, Syriac, Arabic, Ethiopic, Georgian, and Armenian translations have survived in their entirety; the Greek version can be reconstructed, though without absolute certainty, from these different translations, while the Hebrew text remains more elusive. The modern Slavonic version is translated from the Latin.

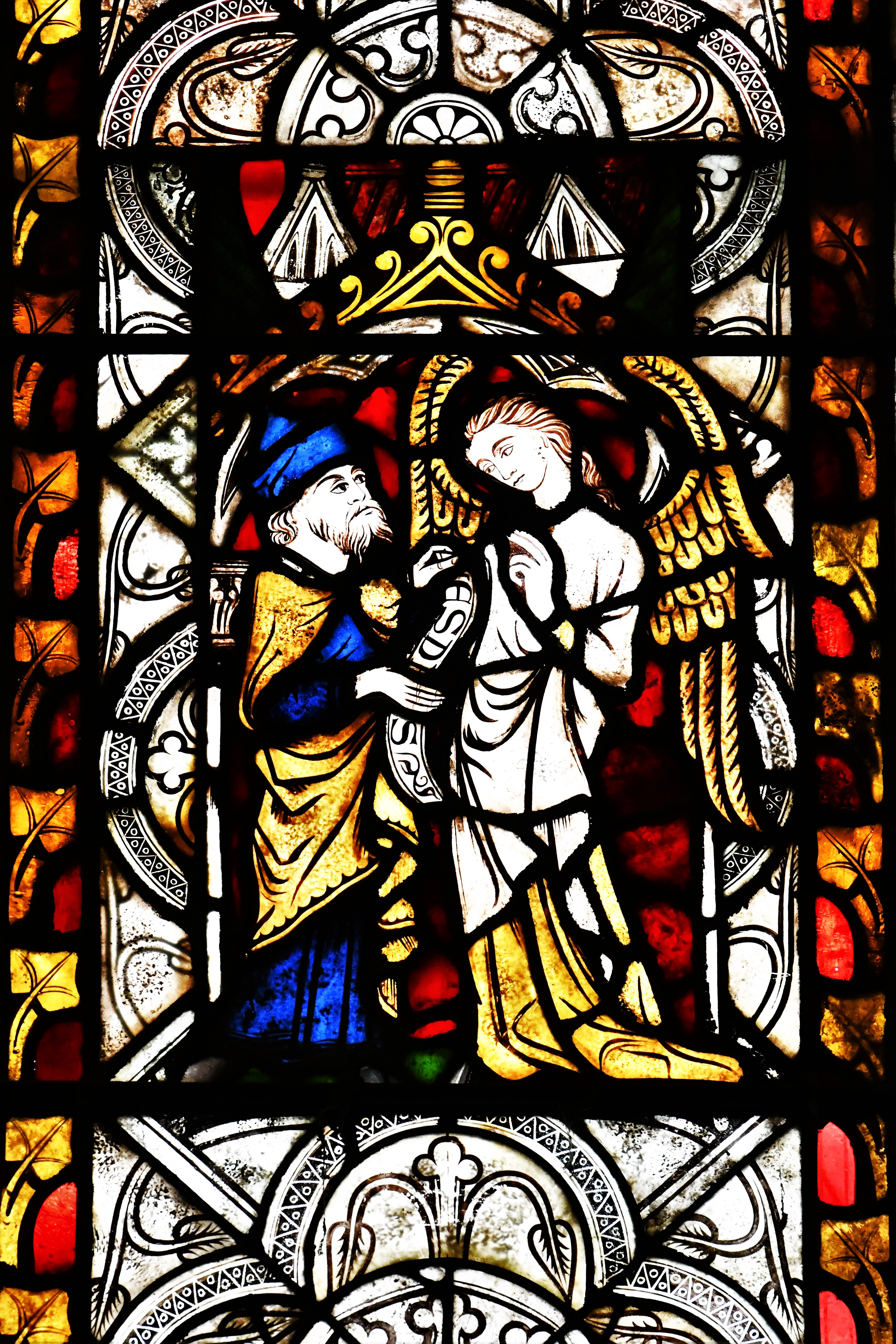
A medieval stained-glass panel depicting the Archangel Uriel with Ezra

4 Ezra consists of seven visions of Ezra the scribe. The first vision takes place as Ezra is still in Babylon. He asks God how Israel can be kept in misery if God is just. The archangel Uriel is sent to answer the question, responding that God's ways cannot be understood by the human mind. Soon, however, the end would come, and God's justice would be made manifest. Similarly, in the second vision, Ezra asks why Israel was delivered up to the Babylonians, and is again told that man cannot understand this and that the end is near. In the third vision, Ezra asks why Israel does not possess the world. Uriel responds that the current state is a period of transition. Here follows a description of the fate of evil-doers and the righteous. Ezra asks whether the righteous may intercede for the unrighteous on Judgment Day, but is told that "Judgment Day is final".

The next three visions are more symbolic in nature. The fourth is of a woman mourning for her only son. She is transformed into a city when she hears of the desolation of Zion. Uriel says that the woman is a symbol of Zion. The fifth vision concerns an eagle with three heads and 20 wings (12 large wings and eight smaller wings "over against them"). The eagle is rebuked by a lion and then burned. The explanation of this vision is that the eagle refers to the fourth kingdom of the vision of Daniel, with the wings and heads as rulers. The final scene is the triumph of the Messiah over the empire. The sixth vision is of a man, representing the Messiah, who breathes fire on a crowd that is attacking him. This man then turns to another peaceful multitude, which accepts him.

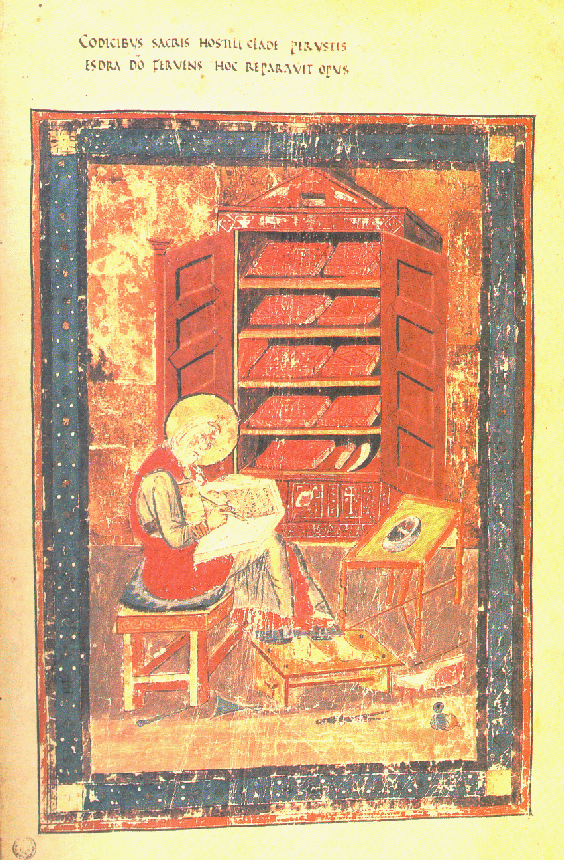
Ezra produces the 94 books (Codex Amiatinus, eighth century)

Finally, a vision of the restoration of scripture is related. God appears to Ezra in a bush and commands him to restore the Law. Ezra gathers five scribes and begins to dictate. After 40 days, he has produced 204 books, including 70 works to be published last. 2 Esdras 14:44–48 KJV:

44 In forty days they wrote two hundred and four books.

45 And it came to pass, when the forty days were filled, that the Highest spake, saying, The first that thou hast written publish openly, that the worthy and unworthy may read it:

46 But keep the seventy last, that thou mayest deliver them only to such as be wise among the people:

47 For in them is the spring of understanding, the fountain of wisdom, and the stream of knowledge.

48 And I did so.

The "seventy" might refer to the Septuagint, most of the apocrypha, or the lost books that are described in the Bible. But it is more probable that the number is just symbolic.

Almost all Latin editions of the text have a large lacuna of 70 verses between 7:35 and 7:36 that is missing because they trace their common origin to one early manuscript, Codex Sangermanensis I, from which an entire page had been cut out very early in its history. In 1875 Robert Lubbock Bensly published the lost verses and in 1895 M.R. James oversaw a critical edition from Bensly's notes restoring the lost verses from the complete text found in the Codex Colbertinus; this edition is used in the Stuttgart edition of the Vulgate. The restored verses are numbered 7:35 to 7:105, with the former verses 7:36–7:70 renumbered to 7:106–7:140. For more information, see the article Codex Sangermanensis I.

Second Esdras turns around a radical spiritual conversion of Ezra in a vision, where he stops to comfort a sobbing woman who turns instantly into a great city (2 Esd. 10:25–27). On this pivotal event, one scholar writes that Ezra:

is badly frightened, he loses consciousness and calls for his angelic guide. The experience described is unique, not just in 4 Ezra, but in the whole Jewish apocalyptic literature. Its intensity complements the pressure of unrelieved stress evident in the first part of the vision, and it resembles the major orientation of personality usually connected with religious conversion.

The following verses (10:28–59) reveal that Ezra had a vision of the heavenly Jerusalem, the true city of Zion, which the angel of the Lord invites him to explore. As the angel tells Ezra at the end of Chapter 10 in the Authorised Version:

And therefore fear not,
let not thine heart be affrighted,
but go thy way in,
and see the beauty and greatness of the building,
as much as thine eyes be able to see;
and then shalt thou hear as much as thine ears may comprehend.
For thou art blessed above many other
and art called with the Highest and so are but few.

But tomorrow at night thou shalt remain here and so shall the Highest show thee visions of the high things which the Most High will do unto them that dwell upon earth in the last days. So I slept that night and another like as he commanded me (2 Esd. 10:55–59).

=== 6 Ezra ===
The last two chapters, also called 6 Ezra by scholars, and found in the Latin, but not in the Eastern texts, predict wars and rebuke sinners. Many assume that they probably date from a much later period (perhaps late third century) and may be Christian in origin; though not certain, they possibly were added at the same time as the first two chapters of the Latin version. They likely are Jewish in origin, however; 15:57–59 have been found in Greek, which most scholars agree was translated from a Hebrew original.

== Author and criticism ==
The main body of the book appears to be written for consolation in a period of great distress (one scholarly hypothesis is that it dates to Titus' destruction of the Second Temple in 70 AD). The author seeks answers, similar to Job's quest for understanding the meaning of suffering, but the author does not like or desire only the answer that was given to Job.

Critics question whether even the main body of the book, not counting the chapters that exist only in the Latin version and in Greek fragments, has a single author. Kalisch, De Faye, and Charles hold that no fewer than five people worked on the text. However, Gunkel points to the unity in character and holds that the book is written by a single author; the author of 2 Esdras has also been suggested to have written the Syriac Apocalypse of Baruch. In any case, the two texts may date from about the same time, and one almost certainly depends on the other.

Critics have widely debated the origin of the book. Hidden under two layers of translation, determining whether the author was Roman, Alexandrian, or Judean is impossible.

The scholarly interpretation of the eagle being the Roman Empire (the eagle in the fifth vision, whose heads might be Vespasian, Titus, and Domitian if such is the case) and the destruction of the temple would indicate that the probable date of composition lies toward the end of the first century, perhaps 90–96, though some suggest a date as late as 218.

== Usage ==
The book is found in the Orthodox Slavonic Bible (Ostrog Bible, Elizabeth Bible, and later consequently Russian Synodal Bible). 2 Esdras is in the Apocrypha of the King James Version, and Pope Clement VIII placed it in an appendix to the Vulgate along with 3 Esdras and the Prayer of Manasseh "lest they perish entirely". The chapters corresponding to 4 Ezra, i.e. 2 Esdras 3–14, make up the Book of II Izra, aka Izra Sutuel, canonical in the Orthodox Tewahedo churches; it was also widely cited by the early Church Fathers, particularly Ambrose, as the 'third book of Esdras'. Jerome states that it is apocryphal. It may also be found in many larger English Bibles included as part of the Biblical apocrypha, as they exist in the King James Version, the Revised Version, the Revised Standard Version, and the earliest editions of the Catholic Douay–Rheims Bible, among others.

The introitus of the traditional Requiem of the Extraordinary Form of the 1962 Tridentine Missal of the Catholic Church is loosely based on 2:34–35: "Eternal rest grant unto them, O Lord, and let perpetual light shine upon them." Several other liturgical prayers are taken from the book. The same chapter, verses 36 and 37, is cited in the Introit of Pentecost Tuesday, "Accipite jucunditatem gloriae vestrae, alleluia: gratias agentes Deo, alleluia: qui vos ad caelestia regna vocavit, alleluia, alleluia, alleluia. Ps. 77 Attendite, popule meus, legem meam: inclinate aurem vestram in verba oris mei. Gloria Patri. Accipite. – Receive the delight of your glory, alleluia, giving thanks to God, alleluia, Who hath called ye to the heavenly kingdoms, alleluia, alleluia, alleluia. Psalm 77 Attend, O my people, to my law: incline your ears to the words of my mouth. Glory be. Receive.” The Alleluia verse Crastina die for the Vigil Mass of Christmas in the Roman Missal is taken from chapter 16, verse 52.

Christopher Columbus quoted verse 6:42, which describes the Earth as created with six parts land and one part water, in his appeal to the Catholic Monarchs for financial support for his first voyage of exploration.

The book is appointed as a scripture reading in the Ordinariate’s Evensong service for All Hallows' Eve.

The work is included in the New Revised Standard Version-based The Life with God Study Bible.

== See also ==
- Esdras
- 1 Esdras
- Deuterocanonical books in Orthodox Christianity
- Ostrog Bible
- Vision of Ezra
