= Ezra =

Figure in early Jewish history

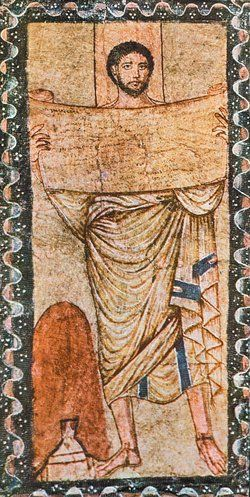
- Painting of Ezra on wood panel from the Dura-Europos synagogue (3rd century CE)

Prophet and priest
- Honored in: Catholic Church; Eastern Orthodox Church
- Feast: 13 July (Catholic); Sunday of the Holy Forefathers (Eastern Orthodox)

Ezra (fl. fifth or fourth century BCE) (Note: /ˈɛzrə/; Biblical Hebrew: עֶזְרָא, romanized: ʿEzrāʾ) (Note: Also known as Esdras, Ezra the Priest, and Ezra the Scribe (עֶזְרָא הַסּוֹפֵר ʿEzrāʾ hasSōfēr) in Chazalic literature) is the main character of the Book of Ezra. According to the Hebrew Bible, he was an important Jewish scribe (sofer) and priest (kohen) in the early Second Temple period. In the Greek Septuagint, the name is rendered as Ésdrās (Ἔσδρας), from which the Latin name Esdras comes. "Ezra" is probably a shortened Aramaic form of the Hebrew name עֲזַרְיָהוּ (ʿAzaryāhū), meaning "Yah helps".

In the Hebrew Bible, or the Christian Old Testament, Ezra is an important figure in the books of Ezra and Nehemiah, which he is traditionally held to have written and edited, respectively. According to tradition, Ezra was also the author of the Books of Chronicles and the Book of Malachi. He is depicted as instrumental in restoring the Jewish scriptures and religion to the people after the return from the Babylonian captivity and is a highly respected figure in Judaism. He is regarded as a saint in the Roman Catholic Church, which sets his feast day as 13 July, the same as that of his contemporary, Nehemiah. He is also venerated as a saint in the Eastern Orthodox Church, which sets his feast day on the Sunday of the Holy Forefathers.

There is no historical consensus on Ezra's historicity or mission due to a lack of extrabiblical evidence and conflicting scholarly interpretations, ranging from viewing him as a historical Aramean official to a literary figure, with debates hinging on the authenticity of the Artaxerxes rescript and its dating.

== Life ==
=== In the Hebrew Bible ===
The canonical Book of Ezra and the Book of Nehemiah are the oldest sources for the activity of Ezra. Many of the other books ascribed to Ezra (e.g., First Esdras and 3–6 Ezra) are later literary works dependent on the canonical books of Ezra and Nehemiah. The book of Ezra–Nehemiah was always written as one scroll.

In late-medieval Christian Bibles, the single book of Ezra was divided into two: as First and Second Ezra. This division became Jewish practice in the first printed Hebrew Bibles. Modern Hebrew Bibles call the two books Ezra and Nehemiah, respectively, as do other modern Bible translations. A few parts of the Book of Ezra (4:8–6:18 and 7:12–26) were written in Aramaic, and the majority in Biblical Hebrew, with Ezra himself being skilled in both languages.

According to the Hebrew Bible, he was a descendant of Seraiah, the last High Priest of Israel (כֹּהֵן גָּדוֹל, kohēn gaḏol, 'great priest') to serve in Solomon's Temple, as well as a close relative of Joshua, the first High Priest of the Second Temple. He returned from the Babylonian captivity and reintroduced the Torah in Jerusalem. According to 1 Esdras, a Greek translation of the Book of Ezra still in use in the Eastern Orthodox Church, he was also a High Priest. Rabbinic Judaism supports the positions that Ezra was an ordinary member of the priesthood and that he served as a High Priest of Israel.

In the seventh year of the reign of Artaxerxes I, the Achaemenid emperor (c. 457 BCE) sent Ezra from Babylon to Jerusalem to teach the laws of God to any Israelite who did not know them. The Book of Ezra describes how he led a group of Judean exiles living in Babylon to their home city of Jerusalem, where he is said to have enforced observance of the Torah. When Ezra discovered that Jewish men had been marrying foreign pagan women, he tore his garments in despair. He confessed the sins of Israel before God, then braved the opposition of some of his fellow Judeans to purify the community by enforcing the dissolution of the sinful marriages. He was described as exhorting the Israelite people to follow the laws of the Torah by not intermarrying with non-Israelites, a set of commandments described in the Torah. Some years later, Artaxerxes in the 20th year of his reign (444 BC) sent Nehemiah, a Jewish noble in his service as a cupbearer, to be the governor of Jerusalem and rebuild the city's walls. Once this task was completed, Nehemiah had Ezra read the Torah to the assembled Israelites, and the people and priests entered into a covenant to keep the Torah's laws and separate themselves from all other peoples.

=== Burial place ===
Several traditions have developed over his place of burial. One tradition says that he is buried in Ezra's Tomb near Basra, Iraq while another tradition alleges that he is buried in Tadef near Aleppo in northern Syria.

According to Josephus, Ezra died and was buried "in a magnificent manner in Jerusalem." If the tradition that Ezra wrote under the pen name Malachi is correct, then he was probably buried in the Tomb of the Prophets, the traditional resting place of Malachi, along with two other prophets from Ezra's lifetime, Haggai and Zechariah. However, according to archeological research, these tombs date from the 1 century BC.

== In later Second Temple period literature ==
=== 1 Esdras ===
1 Esdras, probably from the late 2nd/early 1st centuries BCE, preserves a Greek text of Ezra and a part of Nehemiah distinctly different from that of Ezra–Nehemiah – in particular it eliminates Nehemiah from the story and gives some of his deeds to Ezra, as well as telling events in a different order. Scholars are divided on whether it is based on Ezra–Nehemiah, or reflects an earlier literary stage before the combination of Ezra and Nehemiah accounts.

=== Josephus ===
The first-century Jewish historian Josephus deals with Ezra in his Antiquities of the Jews. He uses the name Xerxes for Artaxerxes I reserving the name Artaxerxes for the later Artaxerxes II whom he identifies as the Ahasuerus of Esther, thus placing Ezra before the events of the book of Esther. Josephus' account of the deeds of Ezra derives entirely from 1 Esdras, which he cites as the 'Book of Ezra' in his numeration of the Hebrew bible. Contrariwise, Josephus does not appear to recognize Ezra-Nehemiah as a biblical book, does not quote from it, and relies entirely on other traditions in his account of the deeds of Nehemiah.

=== The apocalyptic Ezra traditions ===
The apocalyptic fourth book of Ezra (also sometimes called the 'second book of Esdras' or the 'third book of Esdras') was written c. CE 100, probably in Judeo-Aramaic, but now survives in Latin, Slavonic and Ethiopic. In this book, Ezra has a seven part prophetic revelation, converses with an angel of God three times and has four visions. Ezra, thirty years into the Babylonian Exile (4 Ezra 3:1 / 2 Esdras 1:1), recounts the siege of Jerusalem and the destruction of Solomon's Temple. The central theological themes are "the question of theodicy, God's justness in the face of the triumph of the heathens over the pious, the course of world history in terms of the teaching of the four kingdoms, the function of the law, the eschatological judgment, the appearance on Earth of the heavenly Jerusalem, the Messianic Period, at the end of which the Messiah will die, the end of this world and the coming of the next, and the Last Judgment." Ezra restores the law that was destroyed with the burning of the Temple in Jerusalem. He dictates 24 books for the public (i.e. the Hebrew Bible) and another 70 for the wise alone (70 unnamed revelatory works). At the end, he is taken up to heaven like Enoch and Elijah. Ezra is seen as a new Moses in this book.

There is also another work, thought to be influenced by this one, known as the Greek Apocalypse of Ezra.

== In rabbinic literature ==
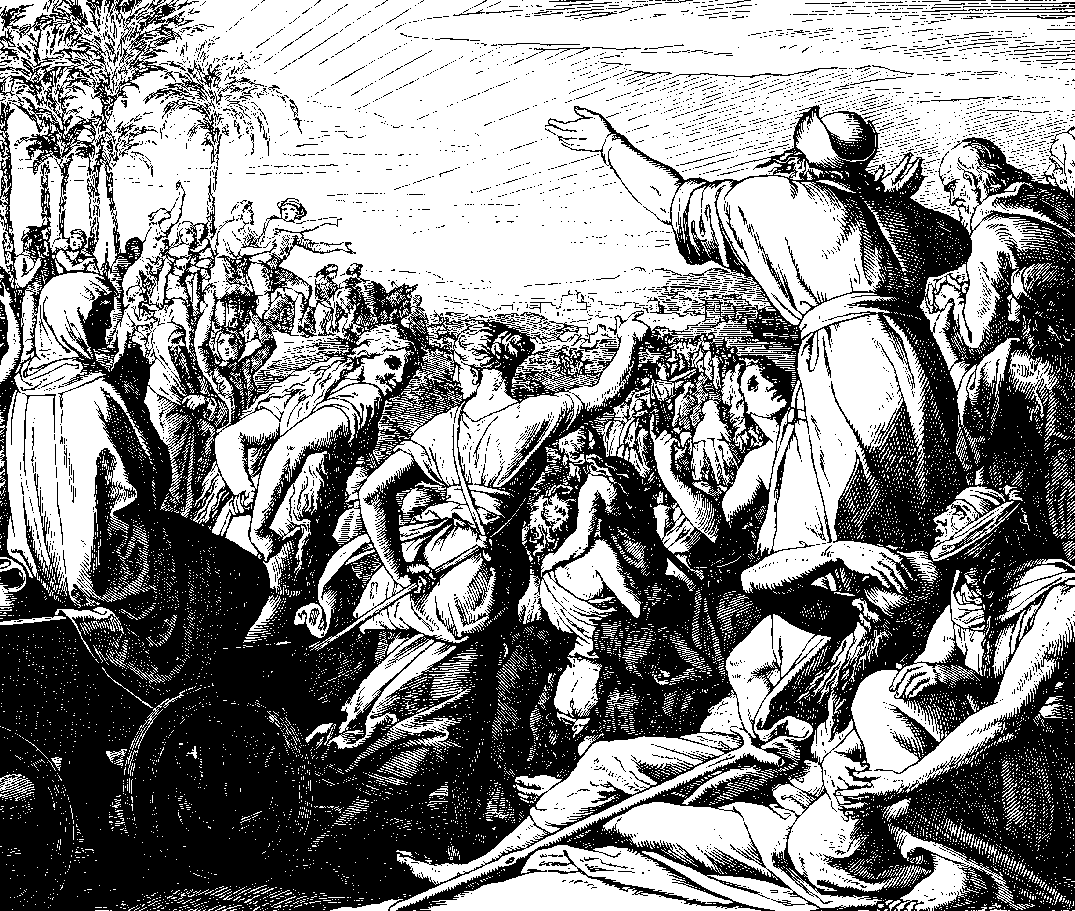
The return from exile is depicted in this woodcut for Die Bibel in Bildern, 1860, by Julius Schnorr von Carolsfeld.

Traditionally Judaism credits Ezra with establishing the Great Assembly of scholars and prophets, the forerunner of the Sanhedrin, as the authority on matters of religious law. The Great Assembly is credited with establishing numerous features of contemporary traditional Judaism in something like their present form, including Torah reading, the Amidah, and celebration of the feast of Purim.

In Rabbinic traditions, Ezra is metaphorically referred to as the "flowers that appear on the earth" signifying the springtime in the national history of Judaism. A disciple of Baruch ben Neriah, he favored study of the Law over the reconstruction of the Temple and thus because of his studies, he did not join the first party returning to Jerusalem in the reign of Cyrus. According to another opinion, he did not join the first party so as not to compete, even involuntarily, with Joshua ben Jozadak for the office of High Priest of Israel.

According to Jewish tradition, Ezra was the writer of the Books of Chronicles, and is the same prophet known also as Malachi. There is a slight controversy within rabbinic sources as to whether or not Ezra had served as High Priest of Israel.

According to the Babylonian Talmud, Ezra the Scribe is said to have enacted ten standing laws and orders, which are as follows:

1. That the public come together to read from the sefer Torah on Shabbatot during the time of the afternoon oblation (Minchah), because of those traveling merchants who loiter in the closed shops in the street corners, and who may have missed the biblical lections that were read during the weekdays.
2. That the courts be opened throughout the Jewish townships on Mondays and Thursdays.
3. That women would not wait beyond Thursday to launder their clothes, because of the honor due to the Sabbath day.
4. That men would accustom themselves to eat [cooked] garlic on the eve of the Sabbath (believed to enhance love between a man and his wife).
5. That women would rise up early on Friday mornings to bake bread, so that a piece of bread would be available for the poor.
6. That Jewish women in every place be girded with a wide belt (waist band), whether from the front or from behind, out of modesty.
7. That Jewish women, during their menses, wash and comb their hair three days prior to their purification in a ritual bath.
8. That the traveling merchants make regular rounds into the Jewish villages and townships because of the honor due to the daughters of Israel (viz., so that jewelry can be purchased by the daughters of Israel).
9. That Jewish women and/or girls, as a precautionary measure, be accustomed to conversing with one another while one of their party goes out to relieve herself in the outhouse.
10. That men who may have suffered a seminal emission (especially after accompanying with their wives) be required to immerse themselves in a mikveh before being permitted to read from the scroll of the Law.

In the Syrian village of Tedef, a synagogue said to be the place where Ezra stopped over has been venerated by Jews for centuries. Another tradition locates his tomb near Basra, Iraq.

== In Christian traditions ==
In Christian tradition, Ezra is considered to be the author of the book of Ezra and 1 and 2 Chronicles. Due to the strong similarity between the books of Malachi and Ezra, some Christian traditions adopt the Jewish view that Ezra was Malachi; Jerome was one prominent Christian who held this view.

Early Christian writers occasionally cited Ezra as author of the apocalyptic books attributed to him. Clement of Alexandria in his Stromata referred to Ezra as an example of prophetic inspiration, quoting a section from 2 Esdras. Where early Christian writers refer to the 'Book of Ezra' it is always the text of 1 Esdras that is being cited.

== In Islam ==
In Islam, he is known as Uzair (Arabic: عزير, romanized: ʿUzayr). He was mentioned in the Qur'an. Although he was not mentioned as one of the Prophets of Islam, he is considered one of them by some Muslim scholars, based on Islamic traditions. His tomb at Al-ʻUzer on the banks of the Tigris near Basra, Iraq, is a pilgrimage site for the local Marsh Arabs. Many Islamic scholars and modern Western academics do not view Uzer as "Ezra"; for example, Professor Gordon Darnell Newby associates ‘Uzayr with Enoch and Metatron.

== Academic view ==
=== Timeline ===
Scholars debate the dating of Ezra's mission due to textual emendations and lack of extrabiblical evidence, with proposed timelines placing his activity either during the reign of Artaxerxes I or Artaxerxes II, complicating the historical context and relationship with Nehemiah. Ezra came to Jerusalem "in the seventh year of Artaxerxes the King". The text does not specify whether the king in the passage refers to Artaxerxes I (465–424 BCE) or to Artaxerxes II (404–359 BCE). Most scholars hold that Ezra lived during the rule of Artaxerxes I, though some have difficulties with this assumption: Nehemiah and Ezra "seem to have no knowledge of each other; their missions seem to have no overlap". These difficulties have led many scholars to assume that Ezra arrived in the seventh year of the rule of Artaxerxes II, i.e. some 50 years after Nehemiah. This assumption would imply that the biblical account is not chronological. The last group of scholars regard "the seventh year" as a scribal error and hold that the two men were contemporaries. However, in Nehemiah 8, Nehemiah has Ezra read the Torah to the people. So, they clearly were contemporaries working together in Jerusalem at the time the wall and the city of Jerusalem were rebuilt in contrast to the previously stated viewpoint. There is a much clearer problem with the timeline in a story from Ezra 4, that tells of a letter that was sent to Artaxerxes asking to stop the rebuilding of the temple (which started during the reign of Cyrus and then restarted in the second year of Darius, in 521 BCE). Clearly no such letter could have been sent to Artaxerxes, as he only became king in 465 BCE, so apparently some events detailing the resistance of leaders of nearby peoples against the works of Nehemiah must have been confused with events during the days of Zerubbabel.

=== Historicity ===
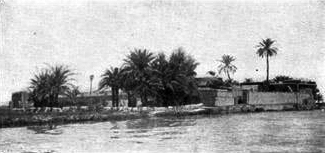
Site traditionally described as the tomb of Ezra at Al-Uzayr near Basra, Iraq

There is no historical consensus on Ezra's existence or mission due to a lack of extrabiblical evidence and conflicting scholarly interpretations, ranging from viewing him as a historical Aramean official to a literary figure, with debates hinging on the authenticity of the Artaxerxes rescript and its dating.

Mary Joan Winn Leith in The Oxford History of the Biblical World believes that Ezra was a historical figure whose life was enhanced in the scripture and given a theological buildup. Gosta W. Ahlstrom argues the inconsistencies of the biblical tradition are insufficient to say that Ezra, with his central position as the 'father of Judaism' in the Jewish tradition, has been a later literary invention. Those who argue against the historicity of Ezra argue that the presentation style of Ezra as a leader and lawgiver resembles that of Moses. There are also similarities between Ezra the priest-scribe (but not high priest) and Nehemiah the secular governor on the one hand and Joshua and Zerubbabel on the other hand. The early 2nd-century BCE Jewish author Ben Sira praises Nehemiah, but makes no mention of Ezra.

Richard Friedman argues in his book Who Wrote the Bible? that Ezra is the one who redacted the Torah, and in fact effectively produced the first Torah. It has been argued that even if one does not accept the documentary hypothesis, Ezra was instrumental in the start of the process of bringing the Torah together.

One particular aspect of Ezra's story considered dubious historically is the account in Ezra 7 of his commission. According to it, Ezra was given truly exalted status by the king: he was seemingly put in charge of the entire western half of the Persian Empire, a position apparently above even the level of the satraps (regional governors). Ezra was given vast hoards of treasure to take with him to Jerusalem as well as a letter where the king seemingly acknowledges the sovereignty of the God of Israel. Yet, his actions in the story do not appear to be that of someone with near unlimited government power, and the alleged letter from a Persian king is written with Hebraisms and Jewish idiom.

Biblical scholar Tova Ganzel has recently argued that Ezra's status as both priest and scribe fits well in its fifth century BCE historical context in light of parallels with the Babylonian temple scribes of the Neo-Babylonian and Persian Periods.

== See also ==
- Esdras – about the classification of the books ascribed to Ezra
- Ezra (name)
- Book of Ezra and Book of Nehemiah – the non-rabbinical tradition
- Ezra–Nehemiah – the combination of the above two books
- 1 Esdras and 2 Esdras – the Greek version of the texts (Meir)
