= Metatron =

Angel in Jewish and Islamic mythology

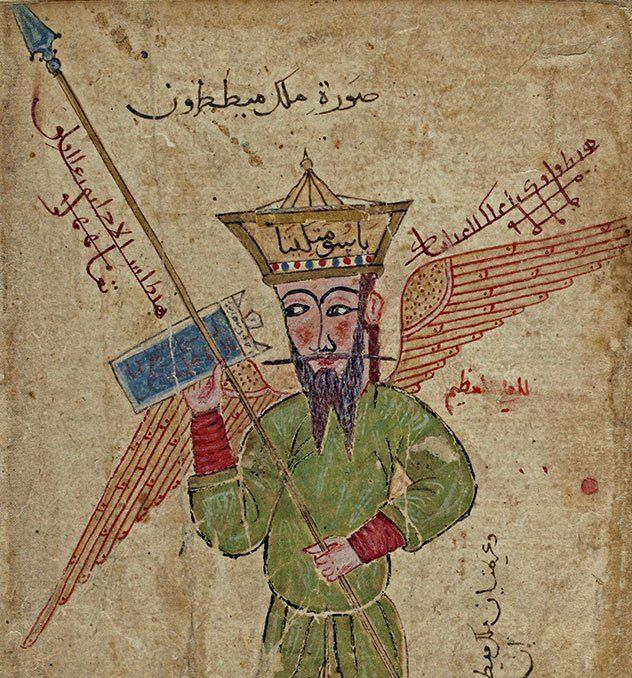
Islamic portrayal of the angel Metatron (Arabic: ميططرون) depicted in the Daqa'iq al-Haqa'iq (دقائق الحقائق 'Degrees of Truths') by Nasir ad-Din Rammal in the 14th century CE.

Metatron (Mishnaic Hebrew: מֶטָטְרוֹן Meṭāṭrōn), (Note: Also written as מְטַטְרוֹן, Məṭaṭrōn, מֵיטַטְרוֹן, Mēṭaṭrōn, מִיטַטְרוֹן, Mīṭaṭrōn, מֶיטַטְרוֹן, Meṭaṭrōn, מִטַּטְרוֹן, Mīṭṭaṭrōn) (Note: There are two spelling variations of the name Metatron that can be found in the Talmud. Firstly there is the more full spelling of מיטטרון, as can be seen in Chagigah 15a:6. The consonant yod (י) acts as a mater lectionis (mother of reading), usually indicating the vowel hiriq (ī). Secondly there is the slightly shorter and more common spelling of מטטרון without the yod, as can be seen in Sanhedrin 38b:19 for example. With the absence of the yod representing the vowel hiriq, this vowel would be pronounced shorter. This short hiriq (ī) would also cause the teth (ט) following the mem (מ) to geminate, giving the pronunciation of Mīṭṭaṭrōn (מִטַּטְרוֹן). The full spelling with yod representing hiriq may also indicate that the name has its origins in the word Mīṭāṭōr (מִיטָטוֹר), referring to a measurer of boundaries; an officer sent in advance of persons of high rank, or of troops, to lay out the camp or to arrange quarters; a quartermaster.) or Matatron (מַטַּטְרוֹן, Maṭṭaṭrōn), is an angel in Judaism. Metatron is mentioned three times in the Talmud, in a few brief passages in the Aggadah, the Targum, and in mystical Kabbalistic texts within Rabbinic literature. In Rabbinic literature, he is sometimes portrayed as serving as the celestial scribe. The name Metatron is not mentioned in the Torah or the Bible, and how the name originated is a matter of debate. In some branches of Sufism, particularly within esoteric or mystical contexts, he is recognized as an Angel and also known as Mīṭaṭrūn (Arabic: ميططرون), the angel of the veil.

In Jewish Apocrypha, early Kabbalah, and rabbinic literature, Metatron is the name that Enoch received after his transformation into an angel. Jewish literature, such as the Sefer Hekhalot (3 Enoch), also mentions Metatron as an archangel, called the "highest of the angels", though the acceptance of this angel is not canonical in all branches of the faith.

== Etymology ==
Numerous etymologies have been proposed to account for the name Metatron, but there is no consensus, and its precise origin is unknown. Some scholars, such as Philip Alexander, believe that if the name Metatron originated in Hekhalot literature and Merkabah texts such as 3 Enoch, then it may have been a magical word like Adiriron and Dapdapiron.

Hugo Odeberg, Adolf Jellinek, and Marcus Jastrow suggest the name may have originated from either mattara (מטרא, lit. 'keeper of the watch') or the verb memater (ממטר, 'to guard' or 'to protect'). An early derivation of this can be seen in Shimmusha Rabbah, where Enoch is clothed in light and is the guardian of the souls ascending to heaven. Odeberg also suggested that the name Metatron might have been adopted from the Old Persian name Mithra. Citing Wiesner, he drew up several parallels that appeared to link Mithra and Metatron based on their positions in heaven and duties.

Another hypothesis would derive Metatron from a combination of two Greek words, μετά (meta, meaning 'after') and θρóνος (thronos, meaning 'throne'), which, taken together, would suggest the idea of 'one who serves behind the throne' or 'one who occupies the throne next to the throne of glory'. The primary arguments against this etymology are that Metatron's function as a servant of the celestial throne emerges only later in the traditions regarding him, and θρóνος itself is not attested as a word in Talmudic literature.

A connection with the word σύνθρονος (synthronos) used as 'co-occupant of the divine throne', has been advanced by some scholars; (Note: synthronos, the Greek term metatyrannos, which can be translated as "the one next to the ruler".) This, like the above etymology, is not found in any source materials. It is supported by Saul Lieberman and Peter Schäfer, who give further reasons why this might be a viable etymology. The Latin word metator ('messenger, guide, leader, measurer') had been suggested by Eleazar of Worms (c. 1165 – c. 1230), Nachmanides, and brought to light again by Hugo Odeberg. When transliterated into the Hebrew language, it is given as מטיטור (mṭyṭwr) or מיטטור (myṭṭwr). Gershom Scholem argues that there is no data to justify the conversion of metator to Metatron. Philip Alexander also suggests this as a possible origin of Metatron, stating that the word metator also occurs in Greek as mitator – a word for an officer in the Roman army who acted as a forerunner. Using this etymology, Alexander suggests the name may have come about as a description of 'the angel of the Lord who led the Israelites through the wilderness: acting like a Roman army metator guiding the Israelites on their way'.

Other ideas include μέτρον (metron, 'a measure'). Charles Mopsik believes that the name Metatron may be related to the sentence from Genesis 5:24, "Enoch walked with God, then he was no more, because God took him". The LXX version of the Hebrew word לָקַ֥ח ("took") is μετέθηκεν.

In the entry entitled "Paradigmata" in his study "'The Written' as the Vocation of Conceiving Jewishly", John W. McGinley gives an accounting of how this name functions in the Bavli's version of "four entered pardes".

== Origins ==
In the Hellenistic period, mention of a second divine figure, either beside Yahweh or beneath him, occurs in several Jewish texts, mostly apocryphal. These Jewish traditions implying a divine dualism were most frequently associated with Enoch. In the rabbinic period, they center on 'Metatron', often in the context of debates over the heretical doctrine of 'two powers in heaven' (shtei rashuyot ba-shamayim). Ultimately, these ideas appear to go back to differing interpretations of the heavenly enthronement passages at Exodus 24:10, Daniel 7:9. and perhaps even Ezekiel 1:26. These different interpretations later came to distinguish what was orthodox from what was heretical in Judaism.

Among the pseudepigrapha 1 Enoch: Book of Parables presents two figures: the son of man and Enoch. At first, these two characters seem to be separate entities. Enoch views the son of man enthroned in Heaven. Later, however, they prove to be the same. Many scholars believe that the final chapters in the Book of Parables are a later addition. Others think they are not and that the son of man is Enoch's heavenly double, similar to the Prayer of Joseph, where Jacob is depicted as an angel. The Book of Daniel displays two similar characters: the Ancient of Days and the one like a man. Parts of the text in Daniel are Aramaic and may have been changed in translation. The Septuagint reads that the son of man came as the Ancient of Days. All other translations say the son of man gained access to the Ancient of Days and was brought before that one.

The identification of Enoch with Metatron in 3 Enoch, where the name first appears, is not explicitly made in the Talmud, although it does refer to a Prince of the World who was young but now is old. However, some of the earliest kabbalists assumed the connection. There also seem to be two Metatrons, one spelled with six letters (מטטרון), and one spelled with seven (מיטטרון). The former may be the transformed Enoch, Prince of the Countenance within the divine palace; the latter, the Primordial Metatron, a sephira "persona" of the "Cause of Causes", specifically the tenth and last persona, identified with the earthly Shekhina. Furthermore, the Merkabah text Re'uyot Yehezkel identifies the Ancient of Days from the Book of Daniel as Metatron.

=== Scholem's scholastic analysis ===
Many scholars see a discontinuity between how Enoch is portrayed in the early Enoch literature and how Metatron is portrayed. Scholars commonly see the character of Metatron as being based on an amalgam of Jewish literature; in addition to Enoch, Michael, Melchizedek, and Yahoel among others are seen as influences.

Scholem argues two streams of thought influenced Metatron's character: One linking Metatron with Enoch, and one fusing different obscure entities and mythic motifs. Scholem argues that this second tradition was originally separate but later fused with the Enoch tradition. He points to texts where this second Metatron is a primordial angel and referred to as Metatron Rabbah. Scholem theorizes that the two Hebrew spellings of Metatron's name represent these two separate traditions. In his view, the second Metatron is linked to Yahoel. Scholem also links Yahoel with Michael. In the Apocalypse of Abraham, Yahoel is assigned duties normally reserved for Michael. Yahoel's name is commonly seen as a substitute for the Ineffable Name.

In 2 Enoch, Enoch is assigned titles commonly used by Metatron such as "the Youth, the Prince of the Presence and the Prince of the World." Enoch is not called the Lesser Yahweh. In 3 Enoch, Metatron is called the Lesser Yahweh. This raises a problem since the name Metatron does not seem to be directly related to the name of God, Yahweh. Scholem proposes that this is because the Lesser Yahweh is a reference to Yahoel. In Maaseh Merkabah, the text reasons that Metatron is called the Lesser YHWH because in Hebrew gematria, Metatron is numerically equivalent to another name of God Shaddai. Scholem does not find this convincing. Scholem points to the fact that both Yahoel and Metatron were known as the Lesser YHWH. In 3 Enoch 48D1, Metatron is called both Yahoel Yah and Yahoel. In addition to being one of the seventy names of Metatron from 3 Enoch 48D, Yahoel and Metatron are also linked in Aramaic incantation bowl inscriptions.

== Talmud ==
The Babylonian Talmud mentions Metatron by name in three places: Hagigah 15a, Sanhedrin 38b, and Avodah Zarah 3b.

Hagigah 15a describes Elisha ben Abuyah in Paradise seeing Metatron sitting down (an action that is not done in the presence of God). Elisha ben Abuyah therefore looks to Metatron as a deity and says heretically: "Perhaps there are, God forbid, two powers in Heaven!" The rabbis explain that Metatron had permission to sit because of his function as the Heavenly Scribe, writing down the deeds of Israel. The Talmud states that it was proved to Elisha that Metatron could not be a second deity by the fact that Metatron received 60 "strokes with fiery rods" to demonstrate that Metatron was not a god, but an angel, and could be punished.

In Sanhedrin 38b, one of the minim tells Rabbi Idith that Metatron should be worshiped because he has a name like his master. Rabbi Idith uses the passage Exodus 23:21 to show that Metatron was an angel and not a deity and thus should not be worshiped. Furthermore, as an angel, Metatron has no power to pardon transgressions nor was he to be received even as a messenger of forgiveness.

In Avodah Zarah 3b, the Talmud hypothesizes as to how God spends His day. It is suggested that in the fourth quarter of the day God sits and instructs the school children, but that before the destruction of the Temple, Metatron may have taken God's place in this activity.

Yevamot 16b records an utterance, "I have been young; also I have been old" found in Psalm 37:25. The Talmud here attributes this utterance to the "chief angel" and "prince of the world", whom the rabbinic tradition identifies as Metatron.

== Kirkisani ==
The tenth-century Karaite scholar Jacob Qirqisani believed that rabbinic Judaism was the heresy of Jeroboam of the Kingdom of Israel. He quoted a version of Sanhedrin 38b, which he claimed contained a reference to the "lesser YHWH". Scholem suggests that the name was deliberately omitted from later copies of the Talmud. Extra-talmudic mystical texts such as Sefer Hekhalot do speak of a "lesser YHWH", apparently deriving the concept from Exodus 23:21, which mentions an angel of whom God says "my name [understood as YHWH, the usual divine Proper Name] is in him".

== Merkabah, Zohar and other mystical writings ==
Metatron also appears in the Pseudepigrapha including Shi'ur Qomah, and most prominently in the Merkabah literature of the 3 Enoch, also called the "Book of Enoch" or "Book of [the Heavenly] Palaces." The book describes the link between Enoch, son of Jared (great-grandfather of Noah) and his transformation into the angel Metatron.

Metatron says, "He [the Holy One] called me, 'The lesser YHWH' in the presence of his whole household in the height, as it is written, 'my name is in him'" (12:5, Alexander's translation). The narrator of this book, supposedly Rabbi Ishmael, tells how Metatron guided him through Heaven and explained its wonders. 3 Enoch presents Metatron in two ways: as a primordial angel (9:2–13:2) and as the transformation of Enoch after he was assumed into Heaven.

And Enoch walked with God: and he was not; for God took him.

— Genesis 5:24, King James Version

This Enoch, whose flesh was turned to flame, his veins to fire, his eye-lashes to flashes of lightning, his eye-balls to flaming torches, and whom God placed on a throne next to the throne of glory, received after this heavenly transformation the name Metatron.

Metatron "the Youth", a title previously used in 3 Enoch, where it appears to mean "servant". It identifies him as the angel that led the people of Israel through the wilderness after their exodus from Egypt (again referring to Exodus 23:21), and describes him as a heavenly priest.

In the later Ecstatic Kabbalah, Metatron is a messianic figure.

The Zohar describes Metatron as the "King of the angels". and associates the concept of Metatron with that of the divine name Shaddai. Zohar commentaries such as the Ohr Yakar by Moses ben Jacob Cordovero explain the Zohar as meaning that Metatron as the head of Yetzira This corresponds closely with Maimonides' description of the Talmudic "Prince of the World", traditionally associated with Metatron, as the core "Active Intellect".

The Zohar describes several biblical figures as metaphors for Metatron. Examples are Enoch, Joseph, Eliezer, Joshua, and others. The Zohar uses "youth" to describe Joseph and Joshua, a hint that the figures are a metaphor to Metatron, and also the concept of servant by Eliezer as a reference to Metatron. The Staff of Moses is also described by the Zohar as a reference to Metatron. The Zohar also states that the two tets in the word totafot (Biblical Hebrew: טוטפת, lit. '"tefillin"') are a reference to Metatron. The Zohar distinguishes Metatron and Michael. While Michael is described repeatedly in the Zohar as the figure represented by the High Priest, Metatron is represented by the structure of the tabernacle itself.

== Apocalyptic texts ==
In the Apocalypse of Zerubbabel, Metatron is not identified as Enoch. Instead, he is recognized as the archangel Michael. The text also records that Metatron in gematria is the equivalent of Shaddai. While he also appears in other apocalyptic writings, he is most prominent in the Apocalypse of Zerubbabel. In these writings, he plays the role of heavenly interlocutor delivering knowledge about the coming messianic age.

== Islam ==
The earliest account of Metatron within Islamic scriptures might derive directly from the Quran itself. Uzair, according to Surah 9:30–31 venerated as a Son of God by Jews, commonly interpreted as an Arabic transliteration of the Hebrew name of the prophet Ezra, who was also identified with Enoch and Metatron in Merkabah Mysticism. In Islamic tradition, Metatron became a symbol for the idea that Jews worship "God-as-old-man" or an angelic being instead of God. Muslim heresiologists repeatedly accused Jews for venerating an angel as a lesser god (or an Incarnation of God), especially for celebrating Rosh Hashanah.

The name itself is attested early in Islam by al-Kindi and al-Masudi. Al-Suyuti identifies him as the angel of the veil and only he knows about that which lies beyond. He is also frequently mentioned in the magical works by Ahmad al-Buni, who describes Metatron as wearing a crown and a lance, probably constituting the Staff of Moses. In other magical practises, he is invoked to ward off evil jinn, devils, sorcerers and other magical threats.

Ibn Hazm mentions that Jews, although regarding Metatron as an angel, would celebrate Metatron as a lesser god ten days each year, perhaps a reference to Rosh Hashanah in connection with Merkabah mysticism that Metatron took part on the creation of the world.

== In popular culture ==
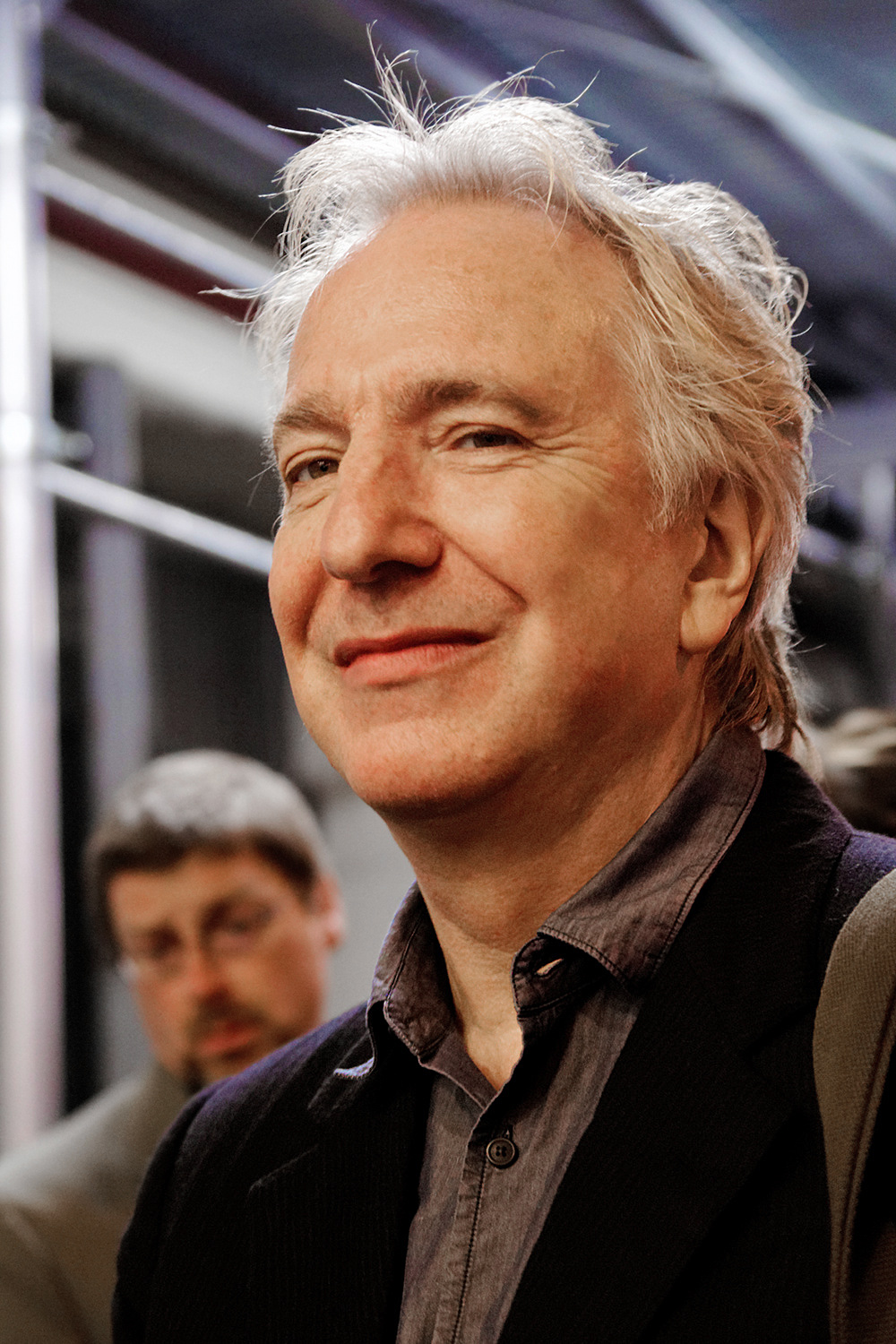
Alan Rickman played Metatron in 1999

- Metatron is invoked in a love ritual by the witch Geli Tripping in Thomas Pynchon's novel Gravity's Rainbow (1973).
- Metatron appears as an angel and the spokesperson of God in the novel Good Omens (1990) and its 2019 TV adaptation. Metatron is played in the series by Derek Jacobi.
- Metatron appears in Phillip Pullman's novel series, His Dark Materials (1995–2000), as the main antagonist. He was originally a human named Enoch before becoming a high-ranking angel and Regent of the Kingdom of Heaven. In the 2019 BBC/HBO TV adaptation, he is portrayed by Alex Hassell.
- Metatron appears in the 1999 movie Dogma as an angel and the voice of God, played by Alan Rickman.
- Guitarist Carlos Santana said in 2000 that he has been in contact with Metatron since 1994, and that the angel gives him messages.
- Metatron appears in the TV series Supernatural (2005) as the scribe of God, played by Curtis Armstrong.
- Both the lyrics and title of the second track on The Mars Volta's 2008 album, The Bedlam in Goliath, refer to Metatron.

== See also ==
- Adam Kadmon
- Abatur in Mandaeism
- Archangel
- Sandalphon
- Theophany
- Yufin-Yufafin in Mandaeism
- List of angels in theology
