= Reception of the Book of Enoch in premodernity =

Reception of the biblical book of Enoch by various authors

The Book of Enoch (also known as 1 Enoch), is an ancient Jewish religious work, ascribed by tradition and internal attestation to Enoch, the great-grandfather of Noah. 1 Enoch holds material unique to it, such as the origins of supernatural demons and giants, why some angels fell from heaven, details explaining why the Great Flood was morally necessary, and an introduction of the thousand-year reign of the Messiah. The unique material makes it possible to identify which ancient literary works adopt 1 Enoch as a source. Well known in antiquity, the book was received by various authors with respect, and sometimes considered as divinely inspired.

== In Judaism ==
=== Qumran ===
Among the Dead Sea Scrolls (ca 300 BC – ca 100 AD), in surviving documents of the Qumran community, Aramaic fragments of 1 Enoch have been found, attesting to an early date of authorship. In addition, the former chief editor of the Dead Sea Scrolls editorial team, John Strugnell, claimed that a complete scroll of 1 Enoch in Aramaic exists in private hands.

=== Philo ===
Philo (b. ca. 25 BC), in a commentary of Gen. 6:1-5 found in On the Giants, uses 1 Enoch's teaching of demons being spirits of the air and the issue of angels that had adulterated with women before the Great Flood.

=== Midrash ===
A Midrash in Pirkei De-Rabbi Eliezer uses material unique to 1 Enoch in stating that the source of women painting their faces with antimony is demonic; this information is not found elsewhere in Scripture (i.e., not in Gen 6:1-5). According to British classicist Robert Graves,

As late as the eighth century A.D., Rabbi Eliezer records in a midrash: “The angels who fell from Heaven saw the daughters of Cain perambulating and displaying their secret parts, their eyes painted with antimony in the manner of harlots; and, being seduced, took wives from among them.” Rabbi Joshua ben Karha, a literalist... decided that “when these angels fell from Heaven, their strength and stature were reduced to those of mortals, and their fire changed into flesh.”

=== Josephus ===
Josephus (37 AD – 100 AD), in his Antiquities of the Jews, adopts nomenclature like that of the book of Enoch, that the "mighty men" of old came about from an unholy union of women and "angels" rather than "sons of God" as in Gen 6. He also discusses "the offspring of the giants" being active in Syria at the time of Abraham, which is also mentioned in the book of Enoch.

=== Rabbinical tradition ===
Material that is unique to 1 Enoch is used in Jewish rabbinical interpretation of Gen. 6:1-5. Classical rabbinic literature is characterized by near silence concerning Enoch. Rabbinic polemics against Enochic texts and traditions might have led to the decline of these books in rabbinic Judaism. The Book of Enoch plays an important role in the history of Jewish mysticism: the scholar Gershom Scholem wrote, "The main subjects of the later Merkabah mysticism already occupy a central position in the older esoteric literature, best represented by the Book of Enoch." Particular attention is paid to the detailed description of the throne of God included in chapter 14 of 1 Enoch.

== In Christianity ==
The Greek text was known to, and quoted favorably by many Church Fathers: references can be found in Justin Martyr, Minucius Felix, Irenaeus, Origen, Cyprian, Hippolytus, Commodianus, Lactantius and Cassian.

=== New Testament ===
According to Joseph B. Lumpkin, who edited a recent transliteration of the book, the Book Enoch is referenced more than one hundred times in the New Testament alone, more than the Psalms:

There are over one hundred comments in the New Testament which find precedence in the book of Enoch… Of all the books quoted, paraphrased, or referred to in the Bible, the book of Enoch has influenced the writers of the Bible as few others have. Even more extensively than in the Old Testament, the writers of the New Testament were frequently influenced by… Enoch.

Until an Aramaic text of the Book of Enoch was discovered at Qumram, Cave 11, it was assumed that Enoch quoted the New Testament. Owing to the discoveries at Qumram, 1 Enoch is now known to be composed earlier than the New Testament.

==== Epistle of Jude ====
Jude 14-15 quotes a section of 1 Enoch 1:9, which is a midrash of Deuteronomy 33:2 as "the seventh from Adam, prophesied” (1 Enoch 1:9). “Seventh from Adam,” Enoch, identifies him as the author, Adam’s fifth great-grandson and thus Noah’s great-grandfather. Many commentators on Jude have noted that Jude uses the dative "prophesied to these" (τούτοις, toutois) and not the normal "concerning these". This is noted as "an odd use of the dative" by Richard Bauckham. “Prophesied” means that Jude is not simply quoting an historical fact, but that Enoch gave a prophecy, which by definition is an utterance from God. The following verses in Jude develop further material from the named book.

=== Epistle of Barnabas ===
The Epistle of Barnabas (ca 70 AD – 132 AD) quotes Enoch as "Scripture", sometimes with the formula "it is written."

=== Justin Martyr ===
Justin Martyr (110 AD – 165 AD), in his Second Apology, uses information unique to the Book of Enoch to establish doctrine on fallen angels and the origin of demons from angels' adultery with women.

=== Athenagoras ===
Athenagoras (133 AD – 190 AD) in his Plea for the Christians uses Enoch to establish doctrine about Genesis 6:1-4, calling Enoch a prophet: "you know that we say nothing without witnesses, but state the things which have been declared by the prophets."

=== Irenaeus ===
Irenaeus (d. 202 AD), in Against Heresies, discusses the doctrine that Enoch was God's legate to fallen angels, which is unique to Enoch, and that a group of fallen angels devised methods of sorcery to adulterate with women.

=== Clement of Alexandria ===
Clement of Alexandria (ca 150 AD – ca 215 AD) writes that both Daniel and Enoch taught the same thing regarding the blessing of the faithful (Eclogue 2.1) and that the fallen angels were the source of the black arts (53.4).

=== Tertullian ===
Tertullian (155 AD – 222 AD), the first author writing in Latin, names and cites Enoch as "divinely inspired" in On the Apparel of Women (Book I) and names Enoch as its genuine, human author. He states that its quotation in Jude 14 is an attestation in the New Testament to its authenticity, though he notes that it is "not received by some, because it is not admitted into the Jewish canon either". He writes—

But since Enoch in the same Scripture has preached likewise concerning the Lord, nothing at all must be rejected by us which pertains to us; and we read that “every Scripture suitable for edification is divinely inspired” (2 Tim 3:16). By [non-believers] it may now seem to have been rejected for that very reason, just like all the other passages which plainly tell of Christ.

In Book II, Tertullian uses Enoch to establish doctrine against the excessive ornamentation of women, attributing its origin to demons who cohabitated with them before the Great Flood.

Within his Apologetic, in "On Idolatry", he uses Enoch to establish the doctrine that idolatry and astrology originated from demons and that demons are the supernatural issue of fallen angels adulterating with women.

=== Commodianus ===
Commodianus (ca 240) never mentions Enoch but, in his Instructions, uses information unique to the Book of Enoch to establish doctrine on the origin of demons from angels adulterating with women and on the wicked arts they taught. Thus, he shows that heathen gods were actually the same demons.

=== Origen ===
Origen (185 AD – 254 AD), in De Principiis, quotes Enoch and notes that the church did not accept the several other books called "Enoch" as at all "divine" (Against Celsus). However, Enoch is missing in the quotation of a canonical list from Eusebius's Church History attributed to Origen.

=== Anatolius ===
Anatolius (early 3rd c AD – July 3, 283 AD) cites Enoch to interpret the ancient Jewish calendar (in a reference to Enoch, Book of Starlight).

=== Cassiodorus ===
Cassiodorus (ca 485 AD – ca 585 AD), quotes Jude 14 ("In these words he (Jude) verifies the prophecy") to verify Enoch's prophecy as contained in 1 Enoch. In the same Latin translation of comments on the First Epistle of Peter attributed to Clement of Alexandria (ca.150 – 211/216), Cassiodorus also uses Enoch to establish doctrine that fallen angels are apostates from God.

=== Syncellus ===
George Syncellus (d. p̄ 810 AD), who once held a position of authority under the patriarch Tarasios of Constantinople, quotes numerous excerpts of the book of Enoch in his Chronography.

=== Canonical lists ===
In the 9th century Stichometry of Nicephorus, Enoch is relegated (along with ten other texts) to a list of Old Testament apocrypha.

== See also ==
- Aramaic Enoch Scroll
