= 3 Enoch =

Book of Jewish apocrypha

The Third Book of Enoch (Hebrew: ספר חנוך לר׳ ישמעאל כ׳׳ג), also known as The Book of the Palaces, The Book of Rabbi Ishmael the High Priest and The Elevation of Metatron, and abbreviated as 3 Enoch) is a Jewish apocryphal book.

== Authorship ==
Modern scholars describe this book as pseudepigraphal, as it says it is written by "Rabbi Ishmael" who became a "high priest" after visions of ascension to Heaven. This has been taken as referring to Rabbi Ishmael, a third-generation Tanna and a leading figure of Merkabah mysticism. However, he could not have been a High Priest of Israel, as he was born after the Siege of Jerusalem and associated destruction of the Second Temple in 70 CE. An alternative attribution would be the earlier Tanna Ishmael ben Elisha, who lived through the Siege of Jerusalem. Although 3 Enoch contains several Greek and Latin words, the book appears to have been originally written in Hebrew.

== Date of composition ==
Though 3 Enoch purports to have been written in the 2nd century, it was probably composed in or near Babylon, and its final redaction was likely completed in the 5th or 6th century. The oldest printed text of 3 Enoch appears to be the Derus Pirqe Hekalot. It covers 3:1–12:5 and 15:1–2, and it is dated by Arthur Ernest Cowley to around 1650. The name "3 Enoch" was coined by Hugo Odeberg for his first critical edition of 1928.

== Content ==
The name Sefer Hekhalot (Hekhalot meaning palaces or temples), along with its proposed author, places this book as a member of Hekhalot literature, a genre which overlaps with the Merkabah or "Chariot" literature. Although 3 Enoch does not contain Merkabah hymns, it contains many of the concepts found in other Merkabah texts. It also has a unique layout and adjuration. All these facts make 3 Enoch unique not just among Merkabah writings, but also within the genre of Enochian literature. Several indications suggest that the writers of 3 Enoch were familiar with the content of 1 Enoch (an apocalyptic text dating to the Second Temple period).

Some points that appear in 1 Enoch and 3 Enoch are:

- Enoch ascends to Heaven in a “storm chariot” (3 Enoch 6:1; 7:1)
- Enoch is transformed into an angel (3 Enoch 9:1–5; 15:1–2)
- Enoch is enthroned in Heaven as the exalted angel Metatron (3 Enoch 10:1–3; 16:1)
- Enoch receives a revelation of cosmological secrets of creation (3 Enoch 13:1–2)
- The story about precious metals and how they will not avail their users and those that make idols from them (3 Enoch 5:7–14)
- Hostile angels named 'Uzza, 'Azza, and 'Azael challenge Enoch before God (3 Enoch 4:6) and are mentioned again in passing (5:9)

The main themes running through 3 Enoch are the ascension of Enoch into Heaven and his transformation into the angel Metatron.

This Enoch, whose flesh was turned to flame, his veins to fire, his eye-lashes to flashes of lightning, his eye-balls to flaming torches, and whom God placed on a throne next to the throne of glory, received after this heavenly transformation the name Metatron.

— Gershom Scholem (1941), Major Trends in Jewish Mysticism, p. 67.

== Canonicity ==
3 Enoch is not included in the biblical canon of any denomination of Judaism or Christianity.

== Translations ==
3 Enoch was translated into English by Hugo Odeberg.

== See also ==
- 1 Enoch
- 2 Enoch
- Primary texts of Kabbalah
- Charlesworth, James H., ed. (1983). "(Hebrew Apocalypse of) Enoch (Fifth to Sixth Century A.D.)". The Old Testament Pseudepigrapha. Vol. 1: Apocalyptic Literature and Testaments. Translated by Alexander, Philip S. Peabody, Massachusetts: Hendrickson Publishers. pp. 223–316. ISBN 978-1598564914.
- Evans, Craig A., ed. (1992). Noncanonical writings and New Testament Interpretation. Peabody, Massachusetts: Hendrickson Publishers. ISBN 0-943575-95-8.
