= Pseudo-Vigilius =

Pseudo-Vigilius is the name conventionally given to the anonymous authors of the Latin pseudepigrapha of Vigilius of Thapsus. Two of such works are:

- De Trinitate (On the Trinity), a collection of works by a variety of authors, dating from the 4th and 5th centuries. It is divided into twelve books. The ninth and twelfth books are transmitted independently as the Fides Damasi and as a supposed translation of a work of Athanasius, respectively. The tenth and eleventh books are quoted by Augustine.
- Contra Varimadum arianum (Against Varimadus the Arian)

Editions of both have been published by Benedikt Schwank in Florilegia Biblica Africana saec. V (Brepols, 1961).
