= George Schodde =

George Henry Schodde (April 15, 1854 – September 15, 1917) was a scholar of Coptic language and Old Testament pseudepigrapha.

He graduated Ph.D (Leipzig 1876) and joined the Lutheran General Council (USA). He was Professor at Capital University, Columbus, Ohio. He produced a translation of 1 Enoch in 1885.

== Personal life ==
Schodde was born in Allegheny City, Pennsylvania. His parents were George F. Schodde and Mary Louise Tücke. In 1881, he married Mary Dorsch.

== Bibliography ==
- Rev. Schodde (1882). The Book of Enoch. Translated from the Ethiopic (Geez) with introduction and notes (also known as 1 Enoch or Enoch Ethiopic), pp. 293
- Rev. Schodde (1888). The Book of Jubilees. Written by Moses on Mount Horeb, translated from the Ethiopic, pp. 154
- The Protestant Church in Germany
- The error of modern Missouri
- Outlines of Biblical hermeneutics
- Hêrmâ Nabî Ethiopic version of Pastor Hermae
- Pentateuch Testimony
- The Development of New Testament Judaism
