= Against Varimadus =

Against Varimadus the Arian (Contra Varimadum arianum) is an anonymous Nicene theological handbook against the Homoian heresy, written in Latin in a polemical style between 439 and 484. It is in the literary form of testimonia (testimonies), which the reader is supposed to be able to use to respond to Homoian adversaries. It belongs to the genre of heresiology, which was used to define orthodoxy and heresy.

According to its preface, its author was a native of Roman Africa living in exile in Naples after the Vandal takeover of his province. He had received from a "learned and extremely pious" friend a copy of a work written by one Varimadus, whom he describes as "deacon of the Arian sect". He chose to write a lengthy refutation using "weighty evidence" and "legal documents", by which he means the Bible. His quotations from the Bible belong to the Old Latin translation.

Although Against Varimadus presents itself as a refutation of a (now lost) work by Varimadus, there is ample evidence that the author made use of existing anti-Arian writings. The actual, specific beliefs of Varimadus are therefore "unrecoverable". In the preface, the author admits to omitting certain "superfluous and unconnected words ... proffered by [the Arians] to subvert the faithful" in order "to refute those things, which we know to be put forward" by them. Against Varimadus is divided into three books. The first contains 73 headings and concerns the Trinity, especially the equality of God the Son and God the Father. The second concerns the equality of the Holy Spirit with Father and Son. The third, in 100 headings, covers the names of God as found in the Old and New Testaments. The basic structure of a singular refutation is "if they say X, you should say Y".

In some manuscripts, Against Varimadus is erroneously attributed to Vigilius of Thapsus. Its anonymous author is thus sometimes known for convenience as Pseudo-Vigilius. The text is notable as one of only two Latin witnesses to the Book of Enoch (the other being Ad Novatianum). It quotes a single verse.

== Editions ==
- Schwank, Benedikt, ed. (1961). "Pseudo-Vigilius Thapsensis Opus contra Varimadum". Florilegia Biblica Africana saec. V. Corpus Christianorum Series Latina, 90. Turnhout: Brepols. pp. 1–134.
