= 2 Enoch =

Apocryphal book of the Bible

The Second Book of Enoch (abbreviated as 2 Enoch and also known as Slavonic Enoch, Slavic Enoch, or the Secrets of Enoch) is a pseudepigraphic text in the apocalyptic genre. It describes the ascent of the patriarch Enoch, ancestor of Noah, through ten heavens of an Earth-centered cosmos. The Slavonic edition and translation of 2 Enoch is of Christian origin in the 8th century but is based on an earlier work. 2 Enoch is distinct from the Book of Enoch, known as 1 Enoch, and there is also an unrelated 3 Enoch, although none of the three books are considered canonical scripture by the majority of Jewish or Christian bodies. The numbering of these texts has been applied by scholars to distinguish each from the others.

The cosmology of 2 Enoch corresponds closely with beliefs of the Early Middle Ages about the metaphysical structure of the universe. It may have been influential in shaping them. The text was lost for several centuries, then recovered and published at the end of the nineteenth century. The full text is extant only in Church Slavonic, but Coptic fragments have been known since 2009. The Church Slavonic version itself represents a translation from an earlier Greek version.

Some scholars attribute 2 Enoch to an unidentified Jewish sect, while others regard it as the work of first-century Christians. Some consider it a later Christian work. It is not included in either the Jewish or the Christian canon, except that it was heavily utilized by the Bogomils.

== Manuscript tradition ==
2 Enoch has survived in more than twenty Old Church Slavonic manuscripts and fragments, dated from the 14th to 18th centuries AD. These Old Church Slavonic materials did not circulate independently but were included in collections that often rearranged, abbreviated, or expanded them. Typically, Jewish pseudepigraphic texts in Slavic milieux were transmitted as part of larger historiographical, moral, and liturgical codexes and compendiums, where ideologically marginal and mainstream materials were mixed.

2 Enoch exists in longer and shorter recensions. The first editors considered the longer version to be the original. Since 1921, Schmidt and many authors challenged this theory, and considered the shorter recension to be more ancient. Vaillant showed in 1952 that the additional parts found only in the longer version use more recent terms. Other scholars suggest that both of them preserve original material, and posit the existence of three or even four recensions.

Two different ways of numbering verses and chapters are used for 2 Enoch: the more widely accepted is Popov's of 73 chapters, while De Santos Otero proposed division into 24 chapters.

The best family of manuscripts are copies of the compilation of rearranged materials from Chapters 40–65 found in a 14th-century judicial codex titled The Just Balance (Merilo Pravednoe). It is the oldest of all the manuscripts. The main manuscripts of the longer version are designated R, J, and P. The main manuscripts of the shorter version are designated U, B, V, and N. Several other manuscripts exist. (Note: Other manuscripts are A (0:1–72:10); B2 (1:1–67:3) dated 1701; L (0:1–33:8); P2 (28:1–32:2) dated 18th century; Tr (67:1; 70–72); Syn (71;72); Rum (71:1–73:1); G (65:1–4; 65:6–8); Chr (fragments from 11–58); Chr2 (11:1–15:3); K (71:1–72:10); I (70:22–72:9))

There is one fragment of 2 Enoch in Glagolitic in the Croatian dialect. It dates to the 17th century.

Most scholars believe that the Old Bulgarian version was translated from one or more lost Greek versions, since the text attests to some traditions that make sense only in the Greek language. For example, a tradition found in 2 Enoch 30 that derives Adam’s name from the Greek designations of the four corners of the world. Semitisms found in various parts of the text, such as the words Ophanim and Raqia Arabot, point to the possibility of a Semitic original behind the Greek version.

In 2009, four fragments in Coptic from Chapters 36–42 were identified. They follow the short recension and are related to Manuscript U.

== Dating ==
Dates ranging from the 1st century BCE to the 10th century CE have been proposed, with the late 1st century CE often preferred. The date of the text can be deduced solely on the basis of the internal evidence, since the book has survived only in the medieval manuscripts (even if a reference to 2 Enoch could be found in Origen's On the First Principles i, 3:3). 2 Enoch's composition must be later than that of the Book of the Watchers in 1 Enoch, around the 3rd century BCE. The crucial arguments for the early dating of the text have very largely been linked to the themes of the Temple in Jerusalem and its ongoing practices and customs. Scholarly efforts have been, in this respect, mostly directed toward finding hints that the Sanctuary was still standing when the original text was composed. Scholars note that the text gives no indication that the destruction of the Temple had already occurred at the time of the book's composition. Critical readers of pseudepigraphic texts would have difficulty finding any explicit expression of feelings of sadness or mourning about the loss of the sanctuary.

Affirmations of the value of animal sacrifice and Enoch's halakhic instructions, found in 2 Enoch 59, also appear to be fashioned not in the "preservationist", mishnaic-like style, but rather as if they reflected sacrificial practices that still existed when the author was writing his book. The author tries to legitimize the central place of worship, through reference to the place Ahuzan, which is a cryptic name for a Jewish temple.

Scholars have also previously noted in the text some indications of the ongoing practice of pilgrimage to the central place of worship. These indications could be expected in a text written in the Alexandrian diaspora. In his instructions to the children, Enoch repeatedly encourages them to bring the gifts before the face of God for the remission of sins, a practice which appears to recall well-known sacrificial customs widespread in the Second Temple period. Further, the Old Church Slavonic apocalypse also contains a direct command to visit the Temple three times a day, an inconsistency if the sanctuary had been already destroyed.

== Content ==
=== Divisions ===
The book can be divided into four sections:

- In the first section (chapters 1–22), Enoch, at the age of 365, is taken by two angels through the ten heavens, one by one.
- In the second section (chapters 23–37), Enoch, now guided by Gabriel, speaks with God in the tenth heaven face to face. Afterwards, he is anointed by Michael, and becomes similar in appearance to the angels. God creates orders (ranks/groups) of angels, but one angel among them backed by his order (group), tries to establish his own throne above God's throne. God thus throws him and his order down, so that they remain above the bottomless pit. (This story seems similar to that of the War in Heaven between God and Satan.) The group of angels, identified as the angels of Satanail, later seduce (tempt) Eve in the Garden of Eden. The Lord asks the angel Vereviel to dictate to Enoch 360 books containing all that is knowable. Later, the Lord himself tells Enoch the secrets, unknown even to the angels, of the Creation until the Flood. Enoch is then sent back to Earth for thirty days.
- The third section (chapters 38–68) is a list of doctrinal and ethical instructions given by Enoch to his sons. The main moral principle is to have love for all living beings (similar to the ethics found in the Testaments of the Twelve Patriarchs). Particularly noticeable is a lack of interest in the sin of fornication, and not once is the Law of Moses referred to. Enoch teaches the uselessness of intercessions. At the end of the thirty days, Enoch is taken into heaven forever.
- The last section (sometimes referred to as the Exaltation of Melchizedek) outlines the priestly succession of Enoch. Enoch's son, Methuselah, is asked by the people to act as an interim priest. The priesthood of Nir, grandson of Methuselah, is also temporary. Then the miraculous birth of Melchizedek and his priesthood are narrated (see Melchizedek#Hellenistic Judaism for a short summary). In manuscript B and in the long versions, this section ends with a short narrative of the Deluge.

=== Ten heavens ===
The Second Book of Enoch, also known as The Book of the Secrets of Enoch, is most noted for its description of multiple heavens and accounts of battles between angels and devils. This account is thought to have been known by and to have influenced the apostle Paul who described his experience of being taken up to the third heaven (2 Corinthians 12:2-4). Enoch describes the ten heavens this way:

1. The first heaven is just above the firmament (Genesis 1:6-7) where the angels control atmospheric phenomena such as the storehouses of snow and rain and the waters above.
2. In the second heaven, Enoch finds darkness: a prison where rebel angels are tortured.
3. In the third heaven, he sees both paradise represented as the Garden of Eden which is also guarded by angels (similar to 2 Corinthians 12:2) and hell where bad men are tortured.
4. The fourth heaven is the place of the movements of the Sun and of the Moon, which are described in detail. Around the Sun he sees angelic creatures known as phoenixes (which also reside in the sixth heaven) and chalkydri. There is also on this level a heavenly choir comprising soldier angels whose singing is wonderful and marvelous.
5. In the fifth heaven, Enoch finds some Grigori: soldiers of Satan that look like human beings but were giants. They were in a state of limbo, having not yet been condemned, and Enoch convinced them to repent.
6. In the sixth heaven, he sees the angels in charge of governing the cosmos and people. These are the archangels who are above angels, measure all life in heaven and on earth, and the angels who are (appointed) over seasons and years, the angels who are over rivers and sea, and who are over the fruits of the earth, and the angels who are over every grass, giving food to all, to every living thing, and the angels who write all the souls of men, and all their deeds, and their lives before the Lord's face.
7. In the seventh heaven, Enoch, now guided by Gabriel, is allowed to enter and sees the Lord on his throne face to face but only from a distance. This is where the legions of God's angels live in beautiful light.
8. The eighth heaven is just below the upper firmament in which are stuck the constellations; here resides Muzaloth, changer of the seasons and mover of the constellations.
9. The ninth heaven is the upper firmament in which are fixed the constellations and the changer of the seasons.
10. The tenth and final heaven is where God's throne resides and God's face may be seen up close. Here he holds court.

=== Exaltation of Melchizedek ===
Chapters 69–73 of 2 Enoch (sometimes referred as the Exaltation of Melchizedek or 2EM) outline the priestly succession of Enoch. There is not unanimous consensus whether this section belongs to the main body of the text or it is an early addition. Considering the not-fragmentary main manuscripts, 2EM is not included in P V N, it is included partially in J, while it is fully included in R U B, which anyway represent the best traditions of all versions. So we have both shorter and a longer versions of 2EM. Some early authors, as Charles, have not included this section mainly because they based their edition on manuscripts P and N. The lack of this section in recent manuscripts is explained by others because of the scandalous content (the virgin birth of Melchisedek) for Christian copyists. According to Vaillant, who edited the first critical edition of 2 Enoch, there is no evidence that 2EM ever existed separately. Modern editions usually include also these chapters.

The recent discoveries of Melchisedek 11Q13 text at Qumran and of a related text at Nag Hammadi, have made possible to have an idea about the Melchisedek controversy, involving also 2EM and the Letter to the Hebrews, that developed in non-mainstream Jewish communities and in early Christians communities from the 1st century BCE to the 3rd century CE against the traditional Jewish identification of Melchisedek with Shem.

A growing number of scholars recognize the antiquity of 2 Enoch, including also 2EM, and support a pre-70 CE dating for its original composition. Sacchi suggests that 2EM is actually an addition to the main body of the text (the style is slightly different), but a very early addition by someone of the same sect that wrote 2 Enoch (it uses the same language and same typical names as Ahuzan for temple), dating 2EM after the 70 CE but before or about the Letter to the Hebrews. The differences between 2EM with the Letter to the Hebrews (in the Letter to the Hebrews, Melchisedek is primarily a heavenly figure, while 2EM depicts him as an earthly one) don't allow to prove the dependence of 2EM from Hebrews.

== Theology ==
The theological universe of 2 Enoch is deeply rooted in the Enochic mold of the Jewish Apocalyptic literature of the Second Temple period. Yet along with appropriations of ancient traditions about the seventh antediluvian hero, the text attempts to reshape them by adding a new mystical dimension to the familiar apocalyptic imagery. The figure of Enoch portrayed in the various sections of 2 Enoch appears more elaborate than in the early Second Temple Enochic treatise of 1 Enoch. The anointing of Enoch, after he saw face to face the Lord, makes him be similar in appearance to a glorious angel and that allows him to sit above other angels on the left of the Lord.

According to Orlov, in this attempt, one may find the origins of another image of Enoch, very different from the early Enochic literature, that was developed much later in rabbinic Merkabah and Hekhalot mysticism: the image of the supreme angel Metatron, "the Prince of the Presence", found in the later 3 Enoch. The titles of the patriarch found in the Old Bulgarian apocalypse appear to be different from those attested in early Enochic writings and demonstrate a close resemblance to the titles of Metatron as they appear in some Hekhalot sources. These developments demonstrate that 2 Enoch represents a bridge between the early apocalyptic Enochic accounts and the later mystical rabbinic and Hekhalot traditions.

== Usage ==
The Bogomils often used and read the Slavonic book of Enoch. Some have even theorized that the book was made by the Bogomils, but this theory is now rejected.
