= Hugo Odeberg =

- Hugo Odeberg in 1949
- Born: May 7, 1898
- Died: December 22, 1973 (aged 75)

Hugo Odeberg (May 7, 1898–December 22, 1973) was a Swedish scholar and Protestant Minister.

He Translated into English the book of 3rd Enoch.

== Works ==
- 3 Enoch or, The Hebrew book of Enoch (1928)
- The Fourth Gospel: Interpreted in its Relation to Contemporaneous Religious Currents in Palestine and the Hellenistic-Oriental World (1929)
