= Book of Enoch =

Hebrew religious text ascribed to Enoch

- סֵפֶר חֲנוֹךְ መጽሐፈ ሄኖክ
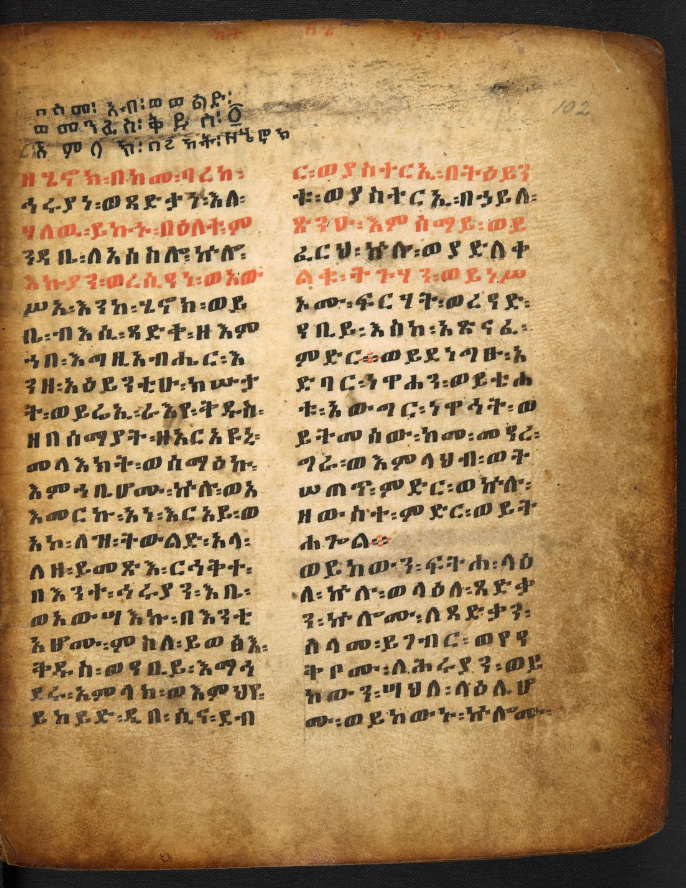
- Start of the Ethiopic Enoch in a 16th-century Ge’ez manuscript

Information
- Author: Unknown
- Language: Aramaic or Hebrew
- Period: c. 300–200 BC (Book of Parables c. 100 BC)
- Chapters: 108

Full text
- 1 Enoch at English Wikisource

The Book of Enoch (also 1 Enoch; (Note: The Book of Enoch is called 1 Enoch to distinguish it from the similarly titled books abbreviated 2 Enoch and 3 Enoch.) Hebrew: סֵפֶר חֲנוֹךְ, romanized: Sēfer Ḥănōḵ; Ge'ez: መጽሐፈ ሄኖክ, romanized: Maṣḥafa Hēnok) is an ancient Jewish apocalyptic religious text from the Jewish people, ascribed by tradition to the patriarch Enoch who was the father of Methuselah and the great-grandfather of Noah. The Book of Enoch contains unique material on the origins of demons and Nephilim, why some angels fell from heaven, an explanation of why the Genesis flood was morally necessary, and a prophetic exposition of the thousand-year reign of the Messiah. Three books are traditionally attributed to Enoch, including the distinct works 2 Enoch and 3 Enoch.

1 Enoch is not considered to be canonical scripture by most movements of Judaism or branches of Christianity, although it is part of the biblical canon used by the Ethiopian Jewish community Beta Israel, as well as the Ethiopian Orthodox Tewahedo Church and Eritrean Orthodox Tewahedo Church.

The older sections of 1 Enoch are estimated to date to c. 300–200 BC, and the latest part (Book of Parables) is probably from c. 100 BC. Scholars believe Enoch was originally written in either Aramaic or Hebrew, the languages first used for Jewish texts. Ephraim Isaac suggests that the Book of Enoch, like the Book of Daniel, was composed partially in Aramaic and partially in Hebrew. No Hebrew version is known to have survived. Copies of the earlier sections of 1 Enoch were preserved in Aramaic among the Dead Sea Scrolls in the Qumran Caves.

Authors of the New Testament were also familiar with some content of the book. A short section of 1 Enoch is cited in the Epistle of Jude, being attributed to "Enoch, the Seventh from Adam" (1 Enoch 60:8). The full Book of Enoch survives in its entirety only in the Geʽez translation. The Epistle of Barnabas quotes from Enoch.

== Synopsis ==
The first part of the Book of Enoch describes the fall of the Watchers, the angels who fathered the angel-human hybrids called Nephilim. The remainder of the book describes Enoch's revelations and his visits to heaven in the form of travels, visions, and dreams.

The book consists of five major sections (see each section for details):

1. The Book of the Watchers (1 Enoch 1–36)
2. The Book of Parables of Enoch (1 Enoch 37–71) (also called the Similitudes of Enoch)
3. The Astronomical Book (1 Enoch 72–82) (also called the Book of the Heavenly Luminaries or Book of Luminaries)
4. The Book of Dream Visions (1 Enoch 83–90) (also called the Book of Dreams)
5. The Epistle of Enoch (1 Enoch 91–108)

Most scholars believe that these five sections were originally independent works (with different dates of composition), themselves a product of much editorial arrangement, and were only later redacted into what is now called 1 Enoch. Because the Book of Parables is unattested in all except the Ethiopic manuscripts, and because a copy of The Book of Giants appears to be written on the same manuscript as a portion of Enoch, it seems likely that the former may have replaced the latter from the original Enochic pentateuch.

=== The Book of the Watchers ===
This first section of the Book of Enoch describes the fall of the Watchers, the angelic beings who fathered the Nephilim, the Sons of God (Hebrew: בְנֵי־הָאֱלֹהִים, romanized: Bənē hāʾĔlōhīm), and narrates the travels of Enoch in the heavens. This section is said to have been composed in the 4th or 3rd century BC according to Western scholars.

==== Contents ====
- 1–5: Parable of Enoch on the Future Lot of the Wicked and the Righteous.
- 6–11: The Fall of the Angels: the Demoralization of Mankind: the Intercession of the Angels on behalf of Mankind. The Dooms pronounced by God on the Angels of the Messianic Kingdom.
- 12–16: Dream-Vision of Enoch: his Intercession for Azazel and the fallen angels: and his Announcement of their first and final Doom.
- 17–36: Enoch's Journeys from the Earth and Sheol: Enoch also traveled through a portal shaped as a triangle to heaven.
- 17–19: The First Journey.
- 20: Names and Functions of the Seven Archangels.
- 21: Preliminary and final Place of Punishment of the fallen Angels (stars).
- 22: Sheol or the Underworld.
- 23: The fire that deals with the Luminaries of Heaven.
- 24–25: The Seven Mountains in the North-West and the Tree of Life.
- 26: Jerusalem and the Mountains, Ravines, and Streams.
- 27: The Purpose of the Accursed Valley.
- 28–33: Further Journey to the East.
- 34–35: Enoch's Journey to the North.
- 36: The Journey to the South.

==== Description ====
The introduction to the book of Enoch reflects that Enoch was "a righteous man, whose eyes were opened by God, saw the vision of the Holy One in the heavens, which the angels showed me, and from them I heard everything, and from them I understood as I saw, but not for this generation, but for a remote one which is for to come".

It discusses God coming to Earth on Mount Sinai with his hosts to pass judgment on humankind. It also recalls the luminaries rising and setting in the order and in their own time and never change:

Observe and see how (in the winter) all the trees seem as though they had withered and shed all their leaves, except fourteen trees, which do not lose their foliage but retain the old foliage from two to three years till the new comes.

The book also discusses how all things are ordained by God and take place in his time. The sinners shall perish and the great and the good shall live on in light, joy and peace.

And all His works go on thus from year to year for ever, and all the tasks which they accomplish for Him, and their tasks change not, but according as God hath ordained so is it done.

The first section of the book depicts the interaction of the fallen angels with mankind; Sêmîazâz compels the other 199 fallen angels to take human wives to "beget us children":

And Semjâzâ, who was their leader, said unto them: "I fear ye will not indeed agree to do this deed, and I alone shall have to pay the penalty of a great sin." And they all answered him and said: "Let us all swear an oath, and all bind ourselves by mutual imprecations not to abandon this plan but to do this thing." Then swore they all together and bound themselves by mutual imprecations upon it. And they were in all two hundred; who descended in the days of Jared on the summit of Mount Hermon, and they called it Mount Hermon, because they had sworn and bound themselves by mutual imprecations upon it.

The names of the leaders are given as "Samyaza (Shemyazaz), their leader, Araqiel, Râmêêl, Kokabiel, Tamiel, Ramiel, Dânêl, Chazaqiel, Baraqiel, Asael, Armaros, Batariel, Bezaliel, Ananiel, Zaqiel, Shamsiel, Satariel, Turiel, Yomiel, Sariel."

This results in the creation of the Nephilim (Genesis) or Anakim ('giants') as they are described in the book:

And they became pregnant, and they bare great giants, whose height was three thousand ells: (Note: The Ethiopian text says 300 cubits (135 m), which is probably a corruption of 30 cubits (13.5 m). However, even this figure may itself be the result of a scribal corruption, as the Greek text refers instead to three groups of giants: the Giants, Nephilim, and Elioud (Eljo in Jubilees 7:21-22). John Baty’s translation of the Ethiopian version replaces this verse with the Greek equivalent in The Book of Enoch the Prophet, Wentworth Press, 2019, ISBN 978-0353916043.) Who consumed all the acquisitions of men. And when men could no longer sustain them, the giants turned against them and devoured mankind. And they began to sin against birds, and beasts, and reptiles, and fish, and to devour one another's flesh, and drink the blood.

It also discusses the teaching of humans by the fallen angels, chiefly Azazel:

And Azâzêl taught men to make swords, and knives, and shields, and breastplates, and made known to them the metals of the earth and the art of working them, and bracelets, and ornaments, and the use of antimony, and the beautifying of the eyelids, and all kinds of costly stones, and all colouring tinctures. And there arose much godlessness, and they committed fornication, and they were led astray, and became corrupt in all their ways. Semjâzâ taught enchantments, and root-cuttings, Armârôs the resolving of enchantments, Barâqîjâl, taught astrology, Kôkabêl the constellations, Ezêqêêl the knowledge of the clouds, Araqiêl the signs of the earth, Shamsiêl the signs of the sun, and Sariêl the course of the moon.

Michael, Uriel, Raphael, and Gabriel appeal to God to judge the inhabitants of the world and the fallen angels. Uriel is then sent by God to tell Noah of the coming cataclysm and what he needs to do.

Then said the Most High, the Holy and Great One spoke, and sent Uriel to the son of Lamech, and said to him: Go to Noah and tell him in my name "Hide thyself!" and reveal to him the end that is approaching: that the whole earth will be destroyed, and a deluge is about to come upon the whole earth, and will destroy all that is on it. And now instruct him that he may escape and his seed may be preserved for all the generations of the world.

God commands Raphael to imprison Azâzêl:

[T]he Lord said to Raphael: "Bind Azâzêl hand and foot, and cast him into the darkness: And make an opening in the desert, which is in Dûdâêl (God's kettle / crucible / cauldron), and cast him therein. And place upon him rough and jagged rocks, and cover him with darkness, and let him abide there for ever, and cover his face that he may not see light. And on the day of the great judgement he shall be cast into the fire. And heal the earth which the angels have corrupted, and proclaim the healing of the earth, that they may heal the plague, and that all the children of men may not perish through all the secret things that the Watchers have disclosed and have taught their sons. And the whole earth has been corrupted through the works that were taught by Azâzêl: To him ascribe all sin."

God gave Gabriel instructions concerning the Nephilim and the imprisonment of the fallen angels:

And to Gabriel said the Lord: "Proceed against the biters and the reprobates, and against the children of fornication: and destroy [the children of fornication and] the children of the Watchers from amongst men [and cause them to go forth]: send them one against the other that they may destroy each other in battle ..."

The Lord commands Michael to bind the fallen angels.

And the Lord said unto Michael: "Go, bind Semjâzâ and his associates who have united themselves with women so as to have defiled themselves with them in all their uncleanness. 12. And when their sons have slain one another, and they have seen the destruction of their beloved ones, bind them fast for seventy generations in the valleys of the earth, till the day of their judgement and of their consummation, till the judgement that is for ever and ever is consummated. 13. In those days they shall be led off to the abyss of fire: (and) to the torment and the prison in which they shall be confined for ever. And whosoever shall be condemned and destroyed will from thenceforth be bound together with them to the end of all generations. ..."

=== Book of Parables ===
Chapters 37–71 of the Book of Enoch are referred to as the Book of Parables. The scholarly debate centers on these chapters. The Book of Parables appears to be based on the Book of the Watchers, but presents a later development of the idea of final judgment and of eschatology, concerned not only with the destiny of the fallen angels but also that of the evil kings of the earth. The Book of Parables uses the expression "son of man" for the eschatological protagonist, who is also called "Righteous One", "Chosen One", and "Messiah", and sits on the throne of glory in the final judgment. The first known use of "Son of Man" as a definite title in Jewish writings is in 1 Enoch, and its use may have played a role in the early Christian understanding and use of the title.

It has been suggested that the Book of Parables, in its entirety, is a later addition. Pointing to similarities with the Sibylline Oracles and other earlier works, in 1976, Józef Milik dated the Book of Parables to the third century. He believed that the events in the parables were linked to historic events dating from c. AD 260–270. According to this theory, these chapters were written in later Christian times by a Jewish Christian to enhance Christian beliefs with Enoch's authoritative name. Knibb followed Milik's reasoning, and suggested that because no fragments of chapter 37–71 were found at Qumran, a later date was likely. Knibb would continue this line of reasoning in later works. In addition to being missing from Qumran, chapters 37–71 are also missing from the Greek translation. Currently no firm consensus has been reached among scholars as to the date of the writing of the Book of Parables. Milik's date of as late as AD 270, however, has been rejected by most scholars. David W. Suter suggests that there is a tendency to date the Book of Parables to between 50 BC – 117 AD.

In 1893, Robert Charles judged chapter 71 to be a later addition. He later changed his opinion and gave an early date for the work between 94 and 64 BC.

The 1906 article by Emil G. Hirsch in The Jewish Encyclopedia states that Son of Man is found in the Book of Enoch, but never in the original material. It occurs in the "Noachian interpolations" (lx. 10, lxxi. 14), wherein it has clearly no other meaning than "man". The author of the work misuses or corrupts the titles of the angels.

Charles views the title Son of Man, as found in the Book of Parables, as referring to a supernatural person: a messiah who is not of human descent. In that part of the Book of Enoch, known as the Similitudes, it has the technical sense of a supernatural Messiah and judge of the world (xlvi. 2, xlviii. 2, lxx. 27); universal dominion and preexistence are predicated of him (xlviii. 2, lxvii. 6). He sits on God's throne (xlv. 3, li. 3), which is his own throne. Charles's translation of 1 Enoch 71:14, however, renders the passage "This is the Son of Man," thereby distinguishing Enoch from the figure. The surviving Ethiopic text uses the second-person pronoun, yielding "You are that Son of Man." According to Emil G. Hirsch these passages betray Christian redaction and emendation.

A number of scholars have suggested that passages in the Book of Parables are Noachian interpolations. These passages seem to interrupt the flow of the narrative. Darrell D. Hannah suggests that these passages are not, in total, novel interpolations, but rather derived from an earlier Noah apocryphon. He believes that some interpolations refer to Herod the Great and should be dated to around 4 BC.

In addition to the theory of Noachian interpolations, which perhaps a majority of scholars support, most scholars currently believe that chapters 70–71 are a later addition in part or in whole. Chapter 69 ends with, "This is the third parable of Enoch." Like Elijah, Enoch is generally thought to have been brought up to Heaven by God while still alive, but some have suggested that the text refers to Enoch as having died a natural death and ascending to Heaven. The "Son of Man" is identified with Enoch. This identification is explicit in the Ethiopic text of 1 Enoch 71:14, which addresses Enoch in the second person as “that son of man.” David Wilber writing in The Christian Post, notes that R. H. Charles's influential English translation instead rendered the passage "This is the Son of Man". He claims Charles acknowledged that the Ethiopic reads "Thou art", but adopted a conjectural emendation to the third person. The text implies that Enoch had previously been enthroned in Heaven. Chapters 70–71 seem to contradict passages earlier in the parable where the Son of Man is a separate entity. James C. VanderKam has proposed that the apparent tension can be resolved by understanding Enoch's earlier visions as revelations of his own future exalted state rather than encounters with a separate contemporaneously existing being. The parable also switches from third person singular to first person singular. James H. Charlesworth rejects the theory that chapters 70–71 are later additions. He believes that no additions were made to the Book of Parables. In his earlier work, the implication is that a majority of scholars agreed with him.

When J.T. Milik first proposed the late date of the Book of Parables, he proposed that the section had replaced an earlier work, the Book of Giants. The Book of Giants follows the giants, the children of the Watchers, who dream of the coming devastation and ask Enoch to interpret the dreams and to intercede for them. One of the recovered fragments of the Book of the Giants from Qumran was written by the same scribe who transcribed a portion of the Book of Enoch, and it is thought that they could belong to the same manuscript (4QEnGiants^{a}ar and 4QEn^{c}ar). Although it is not certain, this would make the Book of Giants the missing piece of Qumran's Enochic pentateuch, later replaced by the Book of Parables in the version of 1 Enoch that was translated into Ge’ez.

==== Contents ====
37. Superscription and Introduction

===== 38–44. The First Parable =====
- 38. The Coming Judgment of the Wicked.
- 39. The Abode of the Righteous and the Elect One: the Praises of the Blessed.
- 40. The Four Archangels.
- 41.1–2. Anticipation of Judgment
- 41.3–9. Astronomical Secrets.
- 42. The Dwelling-places of Wisdom and of Unrighteousness.
- 43–44. Astronomical Secrets.

===== 45–57. The Second Parable =====
- 45. The Lot of the Apostates: the New Heaven and the New Earth.
- 46. The Ancient of Days and the Son of Man.
- 47. The Prayer of the Righteous for Vengeance and their Joy at its coming.
- 48. The Fount of Righteousness: the Son of Man - the Stay of the Righteous: Judgment of the Kings and the Mighty.
- 49. The Power and Wisdom of the Elect One.
- 50. The Glorification and Victory of the Righteous: the Repentance of the Gentiles.
- 51. The Resurrection of the Dead, and the Separation by the Judge of the Righteous and the Wicked.
- 52. The Six Metal Mountains and the Elect One.
- 53–54.6. The Valley of Judgment: the Angels of Punishment: the Communities of the Elect One.
- 54.7.–55.2. Noachic Fragment on the first World Judgment.
- 55.3.–56.4. Final Judgment of Azazel, the Watchers and their children.
- 56.5–8. Last Struggle of the Heathen Powers against Israel.
- 57. The Return from the Dispersion.

===== 58–69. The Third Parable =====
- 58. The Blessedness of the Saints.
- 59. The Lights and the Thunder.
- 60. Quaking of the Heaven: Behemoth and Leviathan: the Elements.
- 61. Angels go off to measure Paradise: the Judgment of the Righteous by the Elect One: the Praise of the Elect One and of God.
- 62. Judgment of the Kings and the Mighty: Blessedness of the Righteous.
- 63. The unavailing Repentance of the Kings and the Mighty.
- 64. Vision of the Fallen Angels in the Place of Punishment.
- 65. Enoch foretells to Noah the Deluge and his own Preservation.
- 66. The Angels of the Waters bidden to hold them in Check.
- 67. God's Promise to Noah: Places of Punishment of the Angels and of the Kings.
- 68. Michael and Raphael astonished at the Severity of the Judgment.
- 69. The Names and Functions of the (fallen Angels and) Satans: the secret Oath.

===== 70–71. Concluding Appendices =====
- 70. The Final Translation of Enoch.
- 71. Two earlier Visions of Enoch.

=== The Astronomical Book ===
Correspondence of weekly day in the Qumran year
	Months 1, 4, 7, 10					Months 2, 5, 8, 11					Months 3, 6, 9, 12				
Wed	1	8	15	22	29		6	13	20	27		4	11	18	25
Thurs	2	9	16	23	30		7	14	21	28		5	12	19	26
Fri	3	10	17	24		1	8	15	22	29		6	13	20	27
Sat (Sabbath)	4	11	18	25		2	9	16	23	30		7	14	21	28
Sun	5	12	19	26		3	10	17	24		1	8	15	22	29
Mon	6	13	20	27		4	11	18	25		2	9	16	23	30
Tues	7	14	21	28		5	12	19	26		3	10	17	24	31

Four fragmentary editions of the Astronomical Book were found at Qumran, 4Q208-211. 4Q208 and 4Q209 have been dated to the beginning of the 2nd century BC, providing a terminus ante quem for the Astronomical Book of the 3rd century BC. The fragments found in Qumran also include material not contained in the later versions of the Book of Enoch.

This book contains descriptions of the movement of heavenly bodies and of the firmament, as a knowledge revealed to Enoch in his trips to Heaven guided by Uriel, and it describes a Solar calendar that was later described also in the Book of Jubilees which was used by the Dead Sea sect. The use of this calendar made it impossible to celebrate the festivals simultaneously with the Temple of Jerusalem.

The year was composed of 364 days, divided into four equal seasons of 91 days each. Each season was composed of three equal months of thirty days, plus an extra day at the end of the third month. The whole year was thus composed of exactly 52 weeks, and every calendar day occurred always on the same day of the week. Each year and each season started always on Wednesday, which was the fourth day of the creation narrated in Genesis, the day when the lights in the sky, the seasons, the days and the years were created. It is not known how they used to reconcile this calendar with the tropical year of 365.24 days (at least seven suggestions have been made), and it is not even certain that they felt the need to adjust it.

Some interpret the words sun and stars in the text as referring to sunlight and starlight, allowing them to interpret the passage in a way that does not conflict greatly with the modern cosmological view. This interpretation is linguistically possible, since the Akkadian cognate of the Hebrew word for sun, šamšum, can mean sunlight or a day; thus, the term could be used to mean sunlight. Likewise, the Akkadian cognate of the Hebrew word for star, kakkabum, can refer to an object resembling a star or even a meteor—hence, the term could be used to mean starlight.

==== Contents ====
- 72. The Sun
- 73. The Moon and its Phases
- 74. The Lunar Year
- 76. The Twelve Winds and their Portals
- 77. The Four Quarters of the World: the Seven Mountains, the Seven Rivers, Seven Great Islands
- 78. The Sun and Moon: the Waxing and Waning of the Moon
- 79–80.1. Recapitulation of several of the Laws
- 80.2–8. Perversion of Nature and the heavenly Bodies due to the Sin of Men
- 81. The Heavenly Tablets and the Mission of Enoch
- 82. Charge given to Enoch: the four Intercalary days: the Stars which lead the Seasons and the Months

=== The Dream Visions ===
The Book of Dream Visions, containing a vision of a history of Israel all the way down to what the majority have interpreted as the Maccabean Revolt, is dated by most to Maccabean times (about 163–142 BC).

==== Contents ====
- 83–84. First Dream Vision on the Deluge.
- 85–90. Second Dream Vision of Enoch: the History of the World to the Founding of the Messianic Kingdom.
- 86. The Fall of the Angels and the Demoralization of Mankind.
- 87. The Advent of the Seven Archangels.
- 88. The Punishment of the Fallen Angels by the Archangels.
- 89.1–9. The Deluge and the Deliverance of Noah.
- 89.10–27. From the Death of Noah to The Exodus.
- 89.28–40. Israel in the Desert, the Giving of the Law, the Entrance into Canaan.
- 89.41–50. From the Time of the Judges to the Building of the Temple.
- 89.51–67. The Two Kingdoms of Israel and Judah to the Destruction of Jerusalem.
- 89.68–71. First Period of the Angelic Rulers – from the Destruction of Jerusalem to the Return from Captivity.
- 89.72–77. Second Period – from the Time of Cyrus to that of Alexander the Great.
- 90.1–5. Third Period – from Alexander the Great to the Graeco-Syrian Domination.
- 90.6–12. Fourth Period Graeco-Syrian Domination to the Maccabean Revolt (debated).
- 90.13–19. The last Assault of the Gentiles on the Jews (where vv. 13–15 and 16–18 are doublets).
- 90.20–27. Judgment of the Fallen Angels, the Shepherds, and the Apostates.
- 90.28–42. The New Jerusalem, the Conversion of the surviving Gentiles, the Resurrection of the Righteous, the Messiah. Enoch awakes and weeps.

=== Animal Apocalypse ===
The second dream vision in this section of the Book of Enoch is an allegorical account of the history of Israel, that uses animals to represent human beings and human beings to represent angels.

One of several hypothetical reconstructions of the meanings in the dream is as follows based on the works of R. H. Charles and G. H. Schodde:

- White colour for moral purity; Black colour for sin and contamination of the fallen angels; Red colour for blood in reference to martyrdom;
- White bull is Adam; Female heifer is Eve; Red calf is Abel; Black calf is Cain; White calf is Seth;
- White bull / man is Noah; White bull is Shem; Red bull is Ham, son of Noah; Black bull is Japheth; Lord of the sheep is God; Fallen star is either Samyaza or Azazel; Elephants are Giants; Camels are Nephilim; Asses are Elioud;
- Sheep are the faithful; Rams are leaders; Herds are the tribes of Israel; Wild Asses are Ishmael, and his descendants including the Midianites; Wild Boars are Esau and his descendants, Edom and Amalek; Bears (Hyenas/Wolves in Ethiopic) are the Egyptians; Dogs are Philistines; Lions and Tigers are Assyrians and Babylonians; Hyenas are Assyrians; Ravens (Crows) are Seleucids (Syrians); Kites are Ptolemies; Eagles are possibly Macedonians; Foxes are Ammonites and Moabites.

==== Description ====
There are multiple links between the first book and this one, including the outline of the story and the imprisonment of the leaders and destruction of the Nephilim. The dream includes sections relating to the Book of the Watchers:

And those seventy shepherds were judged and found guilty, and they were cast into that fiery abyss. And I saw at that time how a like abyss was opened in the midst of the earth, full of fire, and they brought those blinded sheep. (The fall of the evil ones)

And all the oxen feared them and were affrighted at them, and began to bite with their teeth and to devour, and to gore with their horns. And they began, moreover, to devour those oxen; and behold all the children of the earth began to tremble and quake before them and to flee from them. (The creation of the Nephilim et al.)

86:4, 87:3, 88:2, and 89:6 all describe the types of Nephilim that are created during the times described in The Book of the Watchers, though this does not mean that the authors of both books are the same. Similar references exist in Jubilees 7:21–22.

The book describes their release from the Ark along with three bulls – white, red, and black, which are Shem, Ham, and Japheth – in 89:9. It also covers the death of Noah, described as the white bull, and the creation of a number of nations:

And they began to bring forth beasts of the field and birds, so that there arose different genera: lions, tigers, wolves, dogs, hyenas, wild boars, foxes, squirrels, swine, falcons, vultures, kites, eagles, and ravens (89:10)

It then describes the story of Moses and Aaron (89:13–15), including the miracle of the river splitting in two for them to pass, and the creation of the stone commandments. Eventually they arrived at a "pleasant and glorious land" (89:40) where they were attacked by dogs (Philistines), foxes (Ammonites, Moabites), and wild boars (Esau).

And that sheep whose eyes were opened saw that ram, which was amongst the sheep, till it forsook its glory and began to butt those sheep, and trampled upon them, and behaved itself unseemly. And the Lord of the sheep sent the lamb to another lamb and raised it to being a ram and leader of the sheep instead of that ram which had forsaken its glory. (David replacing Saul as leader of Israel)

It describes the creation of Solomon's Temple and also the house which may be the tabernacle:

And that house became great and broad, and it was built for those sheep: (and) a tower lofty and great was built on the house for the Lord of the sheep, and that house was low, but the tower was elevated and lofty, and the Lord of the sheep stood on that tower and they offered a full table before Him.

This interpretation is accepted by Dillmann (p. 262), Vernes (p. 89), and Schodde (p. 107). It also describes the escape of Elijah the prophet; in 1 Kings 17:2–24, he is fed by "ravens", so if Kings uses a similar analogy, he may have been fed by the Seleucids. "... saw the Lord of the sheep how He wrought much slaughter amongst them in their herds until those sheep invited that slaughter and betrayed His place." This describes the various tribes of Israel "inviting" in other nations "betraying his place" (i.e., the land promised to their ancestors by God).

This part of the book can be taken to be the kingdom splitting into the northern and southern tribes, that is, Israel and Judah, eventually leading to Israel falling to the Assyrians in 721 BC and Judah falling to the Babylonians a little over a century later 587 BC. "And He gave them over into the hands of the lions and tigers, and wolves and hyenas, and into the hand of the foxes, and to all the wild beasts, and those wild beasts began to tear in pieces those sheep"; God abandons Israel for they have forsaken him.

There is also mention of 59 of 70 shepherds with their own seasons; there seems to be some debate on the meaning of this section, some suggesting that it is a reference to the 70 appointed times in 25:11, 9:2, and 1:12. Another interpretation is the 70 weeks in Daniel 9:24. However, the general interpretation is that these are simply angels. This section of the book and another section near the end describe the appointment by God of the 70 angels to protect the Israelites from enduring too much harm from the "beasts and birds". The later section (110:14) describes how the 70 angels are judged for causing more harm to Israel than he desired, found guilty, and "cast into an abyss, full of fire and flaming, and full of pillars of fire."

"And the lions and tigers eat and devoured the greater part of those sheep, and the wild boars eat along with them; and they burnt that tower and demolished that house"; this represents the sacking of Solomon's temple and the tabernacle in Jerusalem by the Babylonians as they take Judah in 587–586 BC, exiling the remaining Jews. "And forthwith I saw how the shepherds pastured for twelve hours, and behold three of those sheep turned back and came and entered and began to build up all that had fallen down of that house". "Cyrus allowed Sheshbazzar, a prince from the tribe of Judah, to bring the Jews from Babylon back to Jerusalem. Jews were allowed to return with the Temple vessels that the Babylonians had taken. Construction of the Second Temple began"; this represents the history of ancient Israel and Judah; the temple was completed in 515 BC.

The first part of the next section of the book seems, according to Western scholars, to clearly describe the Maccabean revolt of 167 BC against the Seleucids. The following two quotes have been altered from their original form to make the hypothetical meanings of the animal names clear.

And I saw in the vision how the (Seleucids) flew upon those (faithful) and took one of those lambs, and dashed the sheep in pieces and devoured them. And I saw till horns grew upon those lambs, and the (Seleucids) cast down their horns; and I saw till there sprouted a great horn of one of those (faithful), and their eyes were opened. And it looked at them and their eyes opened, and it cried to the sheep, and the rams saw it and all ran to it. And notwithstanding all this those (Macedonians) and vultures and (Seleucids) and (Ptolemies) still kept tearing the sheep and swooping down upon them and devouring them: still the sheep remained silent, but the rams lamented and cried out. And those (Seleucids) fought and battled with it and sought to lay low its horn, but they had no power over it. (109:8–12)

All the (Macedonians) and vultures and (Seleucids) and (Ptolemies) were gathered together, and there came with them all the sheep of the field, yea, they all came together, and helped each other to break that horn of the ram. (110:16)

According to this theory, the first sentence most likely refers to the death of High Priest Onias III, whose murder is described in 1 Maccabees 3:33–35 (died c. 171 BC).

The "great horn" clearly is not Mattathias, the initiator of the rebellion, as he dies a natural death, described in 1 Maccabees 2:49. It is also not Alexander the Great, as the great horn is interpreted as a warrior who has fought the Macedonians, Seleucids, and Ptolemies. Judas Maccabeus (167–160 BC) fought all three of these, with a large number of victories against the Seleucids over a great period of time; "they had no power over it". He is also described as "one great horn among six others on the head of a lamb", possibly referring to Maccabeus's five brothers and Mattathias. If taken in context of the history from Maccabeus's time, Dillman Chrest Aethiop says the explanation of Verse 13 can be found in 1 Maccabees iii 7; vi. 52; v.; 2 Maccabees vi. 8 sqq., 13, 14; 1 Maccabees vii 41, 42; and 2 Maccabees x v, 8 sqq. Maccabeus was eventually killed by the Seleucids at the Battle of Elasa, where he faced "twenty thousand foot soldiers and two thousand cavalry".

At one time, it was believed this passage might refer to John Hyrcanus; the only reason for this was that the time between Alexander the Great and John Maccabeus was too short. However, it has been asserted that evidence shows that this section does indeed discuss Maccabeus.

It then describes: "And I saw till a great sword was given to the sheep, and the sheep proceeded against all the beasts of the field to slay them, and all the beasts and the birds of the heaven fled before their face." This might be simply the "power of God": God was with them to avenge the death. It may also be Jonathan Apphus taking over command of the rebels to battle on after the death of Judas. John Hyrcanus (Hyrcanus I, Hasmonean dynasty) may also make an appearance; the passage "And all that had been destroyed and dispersed, and all the beasts of the field, and all the birds of the heaven, assembled in that house, and the Lord of the sheep rejoiced with great joy because they were all good and had returned to His house" may describe John's reign as a time of great peace and prosperity. Certain scholars also claim Alexander Jannaeus of Judaea is alluded to in this book.

The end of the book describes the new Jerusalem, culminating in the birth of a Messiah:

And I saw that a white bull was born, with large horns and all the beasts of the field and all the birds of the air feared him and made petition to him all the time. And I saw till all their generations were transformed, and they all became white bulls; and the first among them became a lamb, and that lamb became a great animal and had great black horns on its head; and the Lord of the sheep rejoiced over it and over all the oxen.

Still another interpretation, which has just as much as credibility, is that the last chapters of this section simply refer to the infamous battle of Armageddon, where all of the nations of the world march against Israel; this interpretation is supported by the War Scroll, which describes what this epic battle may be like, according to the group(s) that existed at Qumran.

=== The Epistle of Enoch ===
This section can be seen as being made up of five subsections, mixed by the final redactor:

- Apocalypse of Weeks (93:1–10, 91:11–17): this subsection, usually dated to the first half of the 2nd century BC, narrates the history of the world using a structure of ten periods (said "weeks"), of which seven regard the past and three regard future events (the final judgment). The climax is in the seventh part of the tenth week where "new heaven shall appear" and "there will be many weeks without number for ever, and all shall be in goodness and righteousness".
- Exhortation (91:1–10, 91:18–19): this short list of exhortations to follow righteousness, said by Enoch to his son Methuselah, looks to be a bridge to next subsection.
- Epistle (92:1–5, 93:11–105:2): the first part of the epistle describes the wisdom of the Lord, the final reward of the just and the punishment of the evil, and the two separate paths of righteousness and unrighteousness. Then there are six oracles against the sinners, the witness of the whole creation against them, and the assurance of the fate after death. According to Boccaccini the epistle is composed of two layers: a "proto-epistle", with a theology near the deterministic doctrine of the Qumran group, and a slightly later part (94:4–104:6) that points out the personal responsibility of the individual, often describing the sinners as the wealthy and the just as the oppressed (a theme found also in the Book of Parables).
- Birth of Noah (106–107): this part appears in Qumran fragments separated from the previous text by a blank line, thus appearing to be an appendix. It tells of the deluge and of Noah, who is born already with the appearance of an angel. This text probably derives, as do other small portions of 1 Enoch, from an originally separate book (see Book of Noah), but was arranged by the redactor as direct speech of Enoch himself.
- Conclusion (108): this second appendix was not found in Qumran and is considered to be the work of the final redactor. It highlights the "generation of light" in opposition to the sinners destined to the darkness.

==== Contents ====
- 92, 91.1–10, 18–19. Enoch's Book of Admonition for his Children.
- 91.1–10, 18–19. Enoch's Admonition to his Children.
- 93, 91.12–17. The Apocalypse of Weeks.
- 91.12–17. The Last Three Weeks.
- 94.1–5. Admonitions to the Righteous.
- 94.6–11. Woes for the Sinners.
- 95. Enoch's Grief: fresh Woes against the Sinners.
- 96. Grounds of Hopefulness for the Righteous: Woes for the Wicked.
- 97. The Evils in Store for Sinners and the Possessors of Unrighteous Wealth.
- 98. Self-indulgence of Sinners: Sin originated by Man: all Sin recorded in Heaven: Woes for the Sinners.
- 99. Woes pronounced on the Godless, the Lawbreakers: evil Plight of Sinners in The Last Days: further Woes.
- 100. The Sinners destroy each other: Judgment of the Fallen Angels: the Safety of the Righteous: further Woes for the Sinners.
- 101. Exhortation to the fear of God: all Nature fears Him but not the Sinners.
- 102. Terrors of the Day of Judgment: the adverse Fortunes of the Righteous on the Earth.
- 103. Different Destinies of the Righteous and the Sinners: fresh Objections of the Sinners.
- 104. Assurances given to the Righteous: Admonitions to Sinners and the Falsifiers of the Words of Uprightness.
- 105. God and the Messiah to dwell with Man.
- 106–107. (first appendix) Birth of Noah.
- 108. (second appendix) Conclusion.

== Manuscript tradition ==
=== Geʽez ===
The most extensive surviving early manuscripts of the Book of Enoch exist in the Geʽez language. Robert Henry Charles's critical edition of 1906 subdivides the Geʽez manuscripts into two families:

Family α: thought to be more ancient and more similar to the earlier Hebrew, Aramaic, and Greek versions:

- g = London, British Library MS. Orient. 485, 16th century, with Jubilees
- m = London, British Library MS. Orient. 491, 18th century, with other biblical writings
- q = Berlin, Staatsbibliothek MS. Petermann II Nachtrag 29, 16th century
- t = Paris, Bibliothèque nationale MS. Ethiopien d'Abbadie 35, 17th century
- u = Paris, Bibliothèque nationale MS. Ethiopien d'Abbadie 55, 16th century
- aa = Kebrān Gabre'ēl, Lake Tana MS. 9, 15th century

Family β: more recent, apparently edited texts

- a = Oxford, Bodleian Library MS. Bodl. Or. 531, 18th century
- b = Oxford, Bodleian Library MS. Bruce 74, 16th century
- d = London, British Library MS. Orient. 8822 (formerly Curzon 55), 18th century
- h = London, British Library MS. Orient. 484, 18th century
- i = London, British Library MS. Orient. 486, 18th century, lacking chapters 1–60
- n = London, British Library MS. Orient. 492, 18th century
- p = Manchester, John Rylands Library MS. Ethiopic 23, 18th century
- v = Paris, Bibliothèque nationale MS. Ethiopien d'Abbadie 99, 19th century
- x = Vatican MS. Et. 71, 18th century
- y = Munich, Bayerische Staatsbibliothek Cod.aeth.30, 18th century
- ab = London, MS. property of E. Ullendorff, 18th century

Additionally, there are the manuscripts used by the Ethiopian Orthodox Tewahedo Church for preparation of the deuterocanonicals from Geʽez into the targumic Amharic in the bilingual Haile Selassie Amharic Bible (Mashaf qeddus bage'ezenna ba'amaregna yatasafe 4 vols. c. 1935).

=== Aramaic ===
Eleven Aramaic-language fragments of the Book of Enoch were found in cave 4 of Qumran in 1948 and are in the care of the Israel Antiquities Authority. They were translated for and discussed by Józef Milik and Matthew Black in The Books of Enoch. Other translations were produced by Geza Vermes and by Garcia-Martinez. Milik described the documents as being white or cream in color, blackened in areas, and made of leather that was smooth, thick and stiff. They were also partly damaged, with the ink blurred and faint.

- 4Q201 = 4QEnoch ^{a} ar, Enoch 2:1–5:6; 6:4–8:1; 8:3–9:3,6–8
- 4Q202 = 4QEnoch ^{b} ar, Enoch 5:9–6:4, 6:7–8:1, 8:2–9:4, 10:8–12, 14:4–6
- 4Q204 = 4QEnoch ^{c} ar, Enoch 1:9–5:1, 6:7, 10:13–19, 12:3, 13:6–14:16, 30:1–32:1, 35, 36:1–4, 106:13–107:2
- 4Q205 = 4QEnoch ^{d} ar; Enoch 89:29–31, 89:43–44
- 4Q206 = 4QEnoch ^{e} ar; Enoch 22:3–7, 28:3–29:2, 31:2–32:3, 88:3, 89:1–6, 89:26–30, 89:31–37
- 4Q207 = 4QEnoch ^{f} ar
- 4Q208 = 4QEnastr ^{a} ar
- 4Q209 = 4QEnastr ^{b} ar; Enoch 79:3–5, 78:17, 79:2 and large fragments that do not correspond to any part of the Ethiopian text
- 4Q210 = 4QEnastr ^{c} ar; Enoch 76:3–10, 76:13–77:4, 78:6–8
- 4Q211 = 4QEnastr ^{d} ar; large fragments that do not correspond to any part of the Ethiopian text
- 4Q212 = 4QEn ^{g} ar; Enoch 91:10, 91:18–19, 92:1–2, 93:2–4, 93:9–10, 91:11–17, 93:11–93:1

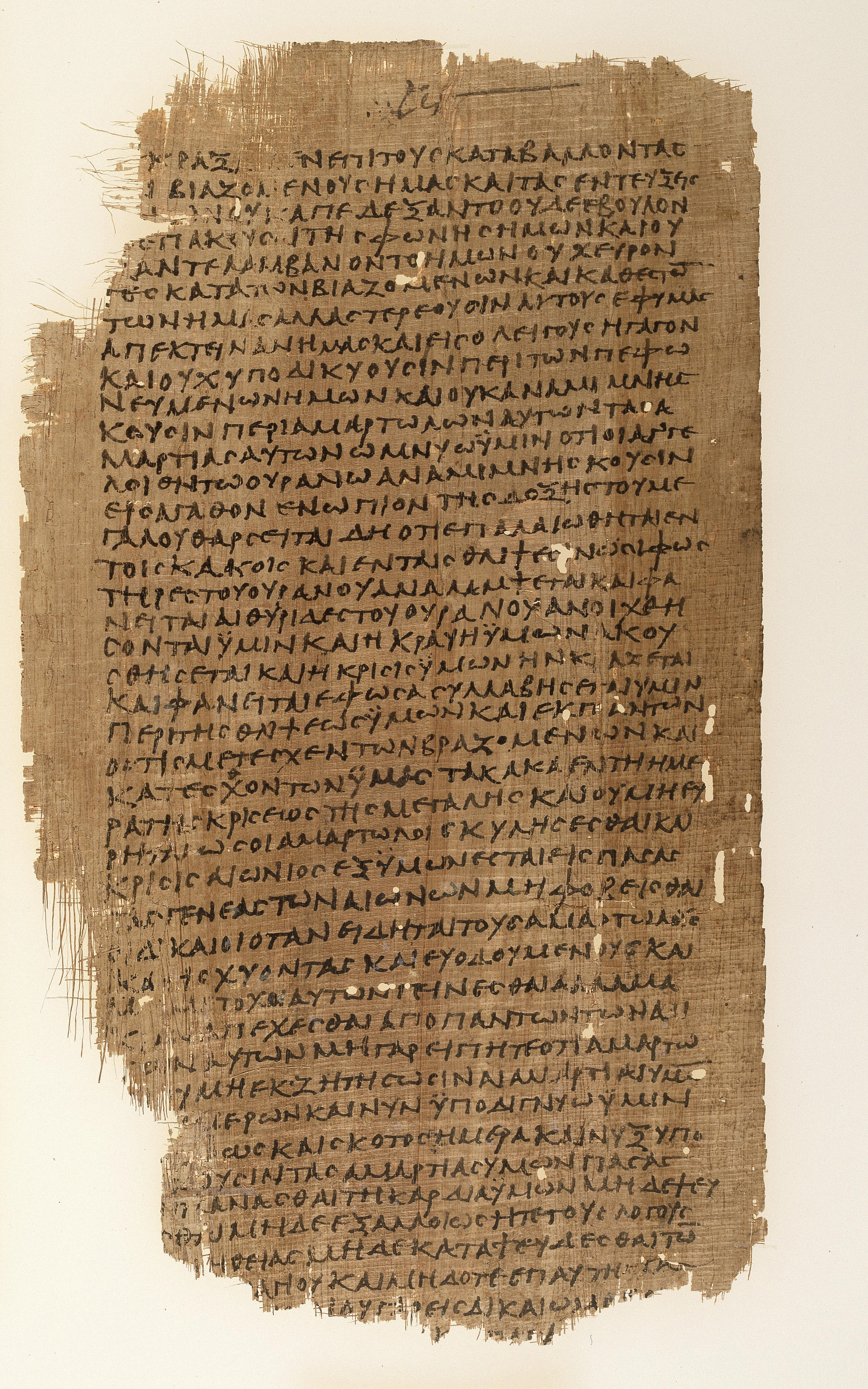
Chester Beatty XII, Greek manuscript of the Book of Enoch, 4th century

=== Greek ===
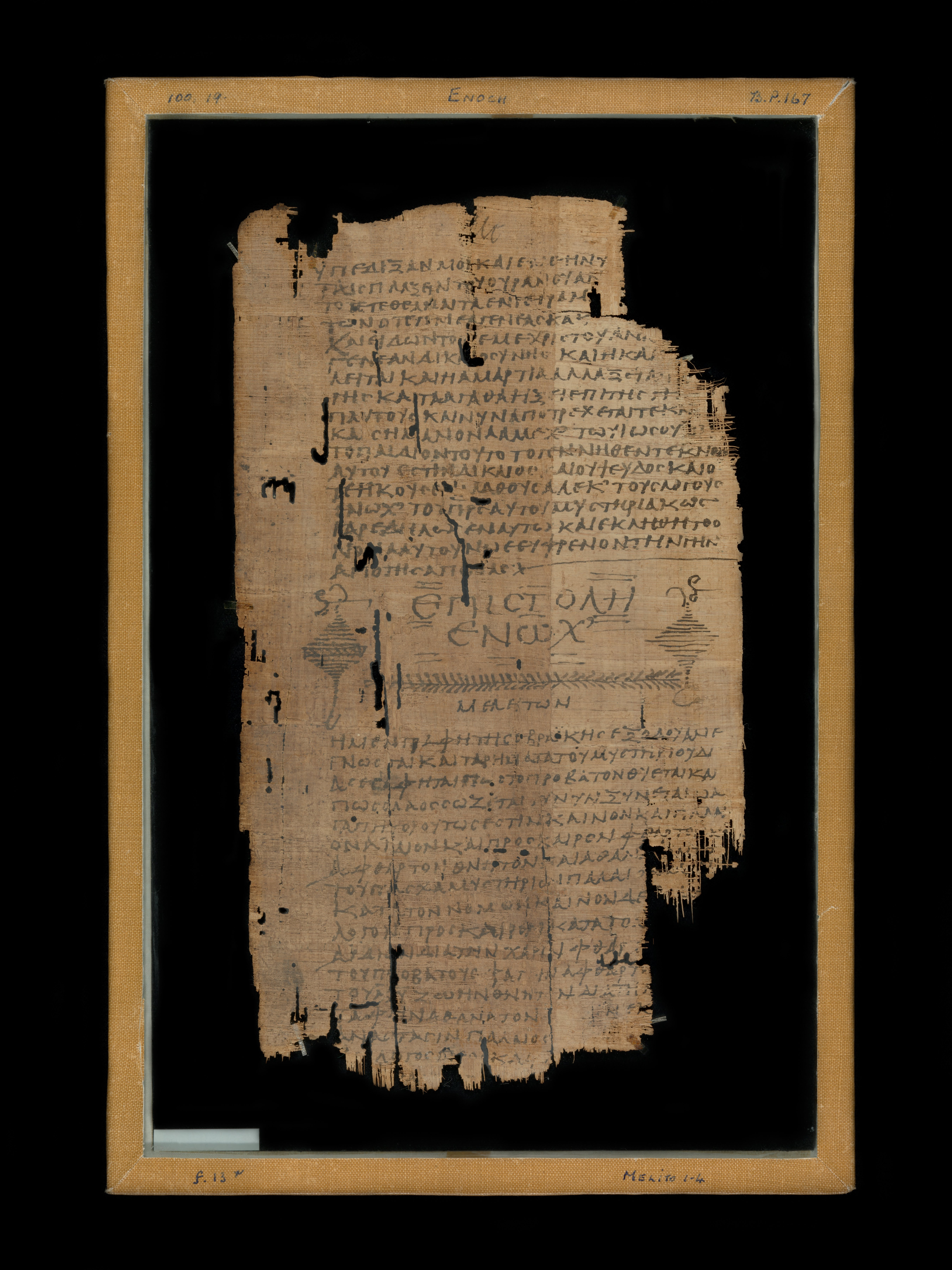
4th century AD manuscript, with the end of 'The Epistle of Enoch' and the beginning of the Passion homily of 'Melito'; note the large text reading ΕΠΙΣΤΟΛΗ ΕΝΩΧ (EPISTOLĒ ENOCH)

The 8th-century work Chronographia Universalis by the Byzantine historian George Syncellus preserved some passages of the Book of Enoch in Greek (6:1–9:4, 15:8–16:1). Other Greek fragments known are:

- Codex Panopolitanus (Cairo Papyrus 10759), named also Codex Gizeh or Akhmim fragments, consists of fragments of two 6th-century papyri containing portions of chapters 1–32 recovered by a French archeological team at Akhmim in Egypt and published five years later, in 1892.

According to Elena Dugan, this Codex was written by two separate scribes and was previously misunderstood as containing errors. She suggests that the first scribe actually preserves a valuable text that is not erroneous. In fact the text preserves "a thoughtful composition, corresponding to the progression of Enoch's life and culminating in an ascent to heaven". The first scribe may have been working earlier, and was possibly unconnected to the second.

- Vatican Fragments, f. 216v (11th century): including 89:42–49
- Chester Beatty Papyri XII : including 97:6–107:3 (less chapter 105)
- Oxyrhynchus Papyri 2069: including only a few letters, which made the identification uncertain, from 77:7–78:1, 78:1–3, 78:8, 85:10–86:2, 87:1–3

It has been claimed that several small additional fragments in Greek have been found at Qumran (7QEnoch: 7Q4, 7Q8, 7Q10-13), dating about 100 BC, ranging from 98:11? to 103:15 and written on papyrus with grid lines, but this identification is highly contested.

Portions of 1 Enoch were incorporated into the chronicle of Panodoros (c. 400) and thence borrowed by his contemporary Annianos.

=== Coptic ===
A sixth- or seventh-century fragmentary manuscript contains a Coptic version of the Apocalypse of Weeks. How extensive the Coptic text originally was cannot be known. It agrees with the Aramaic text against the Ethiopic, but was probably derived from Greek.

=== Latin ===
Of the Latin translation, only 1:9 and 106:1–18 are known. The first passage occurs in the Pseudo-Cyprianic Ad Novatianum and the Pseudo-Vigilian Contra Varimadum; the second was discovered in 1893 by M. R. James in an 8th-century manuscript in the British Museum and published in the same year.

=== Syriac ===
The only surviving example of 1 Enoch in Syriac is found in the 12th century Chronicle of Michael the Great. It is a passage from Book VI and is also known from Syncellus and papyrus. Michael's source appears to have been a Syriac translation of (part of) the chronicle of Annianos.

== History ==
=== Origins ===
Ephraim Isaac, the editor and translator of 1 Enoch in The Old Testament Pseudepigrapha, writes that "1 Enoch is clearly composite representing numerous periods and writers", with the various sections spanning from the early pre-Maccabean era (i.e. c. 200 BC) to AD 160. George W. E. Nickelsburg writes that "1 Enoch is a collection of Jewish apocalyptic traditions that date from the last three centuries before the common era".

=== Second Temple period ===
Paleographic analysis of the Enochic fragments found in the Qumran caves dates the oldest fragments of the Book of the Watchers to 200–150 BC. Since this work shows evidence of multiple stages of composition, it is probable that this work was already extant in the 3rd century BC. The same can be said about the Astronomical Book.

Because of these findings, it was no longer possible to claim that the core of the Book of Enoch was composed in the wake of the Maccabean Revolt as a reaction to Hellenization. Scholars thus had to look for the origins of the Qumranic sections of 1 Enoch in the previous historical period, and the comparison with traditional material of such a time showed that these sections do not draw exclusively on categories and ideas prominent in the Hebrew Bible. David Jackson speaks even of an "Enochic Judaism" from which the writers of Qumran scrolls were descended. Margaret Barker argues, "Enoch is the writing of a very conservative group whose roots go right back to the time of the First Temple". The main peculiar aspects of this Enochic Judaism include:

- the idea that evil and impurity on Earth originated as a result of angels that had intercourse with human women and were subsequently expelled from Heaven;
- the absence of references to terms of the Mosaic covenant (such as the observance of Shabbat or the rite of circumcision), as found in the Torah;
- the concept of "End of Days" as the time of final judgment that takes the place of promised earthly rewards;
- the rejection of the Second Temple's sacrifices considered impure: according to Enoch 89:73, the Jews, when returned from the exile, "reared up that tower (the temple) and they began again to place a table before the tower, but all the bread on it was polluted and not pure";
- the presentation of heaven in 1 Enoch 1–36, not in terms of the Jerusalem temple and its priests, but modelling God and his angels as a court, with its king and courtiers;
- a solar calendar in opposition to the lunar calendar used in the Second Temple (an important aspect for the determination of the dates of religious feasts);
- an interest in the angelic world that involves life after death.

Most Qumran fragments are relatively early, with none written from the last period of the Qumranic experience.

The relation between 1 Enoch and the Essenes was noted even before the discovery of the Dead Sea Scrolls. While there is consensus to consider the sections of the Book of Enoch found in Qumran as texts used by the Essenes, the same is not so clear for the Enochic texts not found in Qumran (mainly the Book of Parables): it was proposed to consider these parts as expression of the mainstream, but not-Qumranic, essenic movement. The main peculiar aspects of the not-Qumranic units of 1 Enoch are the following:

- a Messiah called "Son of Man", with divine attributes, generated before the creation, who will act directly in the final judgment and sit on a throne of glory (1 Enoch 46:1–4, 48:2–7, 69:26–29)
- the sinners usually seen as the wealthy ones and the just as the oppressed (a theme we find also in the Psalms of Solomon).

=== Early influence ===
Classical rabbinic literature is characterized by near silence concerning Enoch. It is possible that rabbinic polemics against Enochic texts and traditions might have led to the fall from use of these books in Rabbinic Judaism.

However, the book of Enoch plays an important role in the history of Jewish mysticism: the scholar Gershom Scholem wrote, "The main subjects of the later Merkabah mysticism already occupy a central position in the older esoteric literature, best represented by the Book of Enoch." Particular attention is paid to the detailed description of the throne of God included in chapter 14 of 1 Enoch.

For the quotation from the Book of the Watchers in the New Testament Epistle of Jude:

And Enoch also, the seventh from Adam, prophesied of these, saying, "Behold, the Lord cometh with ten thousand of His saints to execute judgment upon all, and to convince all who are ungodly among them of all their godless deeds which they have godlessly committed, and of all the harsh speeches which godless sinners have spoken against Him. (Verses 14 & 15)

There is little doubt that 1 Enoch was influential in molding New Testament doctrines about the Messiah, the Son of Man, the messianic kingdom, demonology, the resurrection, and eschatology. The limits of the influence of 1 Enoch are discussed at length by R.H. Charles, Ephraim Isaac, and G.W. Nickelsburg in their respective translations and commentaries. It is possible that the earlier sections of 1 Enoch had direct textual and content influence on multiple Biblical apocrypha, such as Jubilees, 2 Baruch, 2 Esdras, Apocalypse of Abraham and 2 Enoch, though even in these cases, the connection is typically more branches of a common trunk than direct development.

The Greek text was known to, and quoted, both positively and negatively, by a number of Church Fathers: references can be found in Justin Martyr, Minucius Felix, Irenaeus, Origen, Cyprian, Hippolytus, Commodianus, Lactantius and Cassian. After Cassian and before the modern "rediscovery", some excerpts are given in the Byzantine Empire by the 8th-century monk George Syncellus in his chronography, and in the 9th century, it is listed as an apocryphon of the New Testament by Patriarch Nicephorus.

=== Rediscovery ===
Sir Walter Raleigh, in his History of the World (written in 1616 while imprisoned in the Tower of London), makes the curious assertion that part of the Book of Enoch "which contained the course of the stars, their names and motions" had been discovered in Saba (Sheba) in the first century and was thus available to Origen and Tertullian. He attributes this information to Origen, (Note: "[I]t is questionless that the use of letters was found out in the very infancy of the world, proved by those prophecies written on pillars of stone and brick by Enoch, of which Josephus affirmeth that one of them remained even in his time ... But of these prophecies of Enoch, Saint Jude testifieth; and some part of his books (which contained the course of the stars, their names, and motions) were afterward found in Arabia fœlix, in the Dominion of the Queene of Saba (saith Origen) of which Tertullian affirmeth that he had seen and read some whole pages." Raleigh's marginal note reads: "Origen Homil. 1 in Num.", i.e., Origen's Homily 1 on Numbers.) although no such statement is found anywhere in extant versions of Origen.

Outside of Ethiopia, the text of the Book of Enoch was considered lost until the beginning of the seventeenth century, when it was confidently asserted that the book was found in a Geʽez translation there, and Nicolas-Claude Fabri de Peiresc bought a book that was claimed to be identical to the one quoted by the Epistle of Jude and the Church Fathers. Hiob Ludolf, the great Ethiopic scholar of the 17th and 18th centuries, soon claimed it to be a forgery produced by Abba Bahaila Michael.

Better success was achieved by the famous Scottish traveller James Bruce, who, in 1773, returned to Europe from six years in Abyssinia with three copies of a Geʽez version. One is preserved in the Bodleian Library, another was presented to the royal library of France, while the third was kept by Bruce. The copies remained unused until the 19th century; Silvestre de Sacy, in "Notices sur le livre d'Enoch", included extracts of the books with Latin translations (Enoch chapters 1, 2, 5–16, 22, and 32). From this a German translation was made by Rink in 1801.

The first English translation of the Bodleian / Ethiopic manuscript was published in 1821 by Richard Laurence. Revised editions appeared in 1833, 1838, and 1842.

In 1838, Laurence also released the first Geʽez text of 1 Enoch published in the West, under the title: Libri Enoch Prophetae Versio Aethiopica. The text, divided into 105 chapters, was soon considered unreliable as it was the transcription of a single Geʽez manuscript.

In 1833, Professor Andreas Gottlieb Hoffmann of the University of Jena released a German translation, based on Laurence's work, called Das Buch Henoch in vollständiger Uebersetzung, mit fortlaufendem Kommentar, ausführlicher Einleitung und erläuternden Excursen. Two other translations came out around the same time: one in 1836 called Enoch Restitutus, or an Attempt (Rev. Edward Murray) and one in 1840 called Prophetae veteres Pseudepigraphi, partim ex Abyssinico vel Hebraico sermonibus Latine bersi (A. F. Gfrörer). However, both are considered to be poor—the 1836 translation most of all—and is discussed in Hoffmann.

The first critical edition, based on five manuscripts, appeared in 1851 as Liber Henoch, Aethiopice, ad quinque codicum fidem editus, cum variis lectionibus, by August Dillmann. It was followed in 1853 by a German translation of the book by the same author with commentary titled Das Buch Henoch, übersetzt und erklärt. It was considered the standard edition of 1 Enoch until the work of Charles.

The generation of Enoch scholarship from 1890 to World War I was dominated by Robert Henry Charles. His 1893 translation and commentary of the Geʽez text already represented an important advancement, as it was based on ten additional manuscripts. In 1906 R.H. Charles published a new critical edition of the Geʽez text, using 23 Geʽez manuscripts and all available sources at his time. The English translation of the reconstructed text appeared in 1912, and the same year in his collection of The Apocrypha and Pseudepigrapha of the Old Testament.

The publication, in the early 1950s, of the first Aramaic fragments of 1 Enoch among the Dead Sea Scrolls profoundly changed the study of the document, as it provided evidence of its antiquity and original text. The official edition of these Aramaic Enoch fragments appeared in 1976, by Jozef Milik.

The renewed interest in 1 Enoch spawned a number of other translations: in Hebrew (A. Kahana, 1956), Danish (Hammershaimb, 1956), Italian (Fusella, 1981), Spanish (1982), French (Caquot, 1984) and other modern languages. In 1978, a new edition of the Geʽez text was edited by Michael Knibb, with an English translation, while a new commentary appeared in 1985 by Matthew Black.

In 2001 George W.E. Nickelsburg published the first volume of a comprehensive commentary on 1 Enoch in the Hermeneia series. Since the year 2000, the Enoch seminar has devoted several meetings to the Enoch literature and has become the center of a lively debate concerning the hypothesis that the Enoch literature attests the presence of an autonomous non-Mosaic tradition of dissent in Second Temple Judaism.

Jay Winter published his translation of the Ethiopian texts in his Complete Book of Enoch, Standard English Version in 2015.

== Canonicity ==
=== Judaism ===
Judging by the number of copies found in the Dead Sea Scrolls, the Book of Enoch was widely read during the Second Temple period. Today, the Ethiopian Beta Israel community of Haymanot Jews is the only Jewish group that accepts the Book of Enoch as canonical and still preserves it in its liturgical language of Geʽez, where it plays a central role in worship. However, the Book of Enoch was excluded from both the formal canon of the Tanakh and the Septuagint and therefore, also from the writings known today as the Deuterocanon. Possible reasons for Enoch's exclusion from the canon of Rabbinic Judaism include that its teachings on fallen angels and the corruptibility of man did not accord with orthodox Jewish teaching. Its focus on mystical and apocalyptic themes rather than legal and ethical concerns also differs from Rabbinic Judaism.

While books like Enoch were fully accepted by the Qumran community, the later rabbis treated them with suspicion and saw them as inauthentic,

"The term Pseudepigrapha means false writings, i.e., writings whose authors used false names such as biblical heroes like Ezra and Enoch. They did not use their own names because they were considered by the sages of mainstream Judaism to be underground prophets whose writings were inauthentic."

=== Christianity ===
By the fifth century, the Book of Enoch was mostly excluded from Christian biblical canons, and it is now regarded as scripture only by the Ethiopian Orthodox Tewahedo Church and the Eritrean Orthodox Tewahedo Church.

==== References in the New Testament ====
"Enoch, the seventh from Adam" is quoted in Jude 1:14–15:

And Enoch also, the seventh from Adam, prophesied of these, saying, Behold, the Lord cometh with ten thousands of his saints, To execute judgment upon all, and to convict all that are ungodly among them of all their ungodly deeds which they have ungodly committed, and of all their hard speeches which ungodly sinners have spoken against him.

Compare this with Enoch 1:9, translated from the Ethiopic (also found in Qumran scroll 4Q204=4QEnoch^{c} ar, col I 16–18):

And behold! He cometh with ten thousands of His Saints to execute judgment upon all, and to destroy all the ungodly: And to convict all flesh of all the works of their ungodliness which they have ungodly committed, and of all the hard things which ungodly sinners have spoken against Him.

Compare this also with what may be the original source of 1 Enoch 1:9 in Deuteronomy 33:2: In "He cometh with ten thousands of His holy ones". According to Charles (1912), this "... text reproduces the Masoretic of Deuteronomy 33 in reading אָתָא = ἔρχεται, whereas the three Targums, the Syriac and Vulgate read אִתֹּה, = μετ' αὐτοῦ. Here, the Septuagint diverges wholly. The reading אתא is recognized as original. The writer of 1–5, therefore, used the Hebrew text and presumably wrote in Hebrew." (Note: "We may note especially that 1:1, 3–4, 9 allude unmistakably to Deuteronomy 33:1–2 (along with other passages in the Hebrew Bible), implying that the author, like some other Jewish writers, read Deuteronomy 33–34, the last words of Moses in the Torah, as prophecy of the future history of Israel, and 33:2 as referring to the eschatological theophany of God as judge".) (Note: "The introduction ... picks up various biblical passages and re-interprets them, applying them to Enoch. Two passages are central to it. The first is Deuteronomy 33:1 ... the second is Numbers 24:3–4.")

Deut 33:2 (English Standard Version [ESV] translation) The Lord came from Sinai and dawned from Seir upon us; he shone forth from Mount Paran; he came from the ten thousands of Saints, with flaming fire at his right hand.

Other English translations of this passage vary widely.

According to John Barton, under the heading of canonicity, it is not enough to merely demonstrate that something is quoted. Instead, it is necessary to demonstrate the nature of the quotation.

In the case of the Jude 1:14 quotation of 1 Enoch 1:9, it would be difficult to argue that Jude does not quote Enoch as a historical prophet since he cites Enoch by name. However, there remains a question as to whether the author of Jude attributed the quotation to the historical Enoch before the flood or to a midrash on Deuteronomy 33:2–3. (Note: See "Jude" in index of Nickelsburg (2001).) The Greek text might seem unusual in stating that "Enoch the Seventh from Adam" prophesied "to" (dative case) not "of" (genitive case) the men. However, this Greek grammar might indicate the meaning "against them" – the dative τούτοις as a dative of disadvantage (dativus incommodi). (Note: ... '14. of these: lit., 'to these'; Jude has some odd use of the dative'. Also see Wallace, D. Greek Grammar beyond the Basics. The unique use of the dative toutois in the Greek text (προεφήτευσεν δὲ καὶ τούτοις) is a departure from normal NT use where the prophet prophesies "to" the audience "concerning" (genitive peri auton) false teachers, etc.)

Davids (2006) points to the Dead Sea Scrolls evidence but leaves it open as to whether Jude viewed 1 Enoch as canon, deuterocanon, or otherwise: "Did Jude, then, consider this scripture to be like Genesis or Isaiah? Certainly he did consider it authoritative, a true word from God. We cannot tell whether he ranked it alongside other prophetic books such as Isaiah and Jeremiah. What we do know is, first, that other Jewish groups, most notably those living in Qumran near the Dead Sea, also used and valued 1 Enoch, but we do not find it grouped with the scriptural scrolls." Annette Yoshiko Reed (2005) and Lee Martin McDonald (2017) write that Jude cites 1 Enoch as being a prophetic text, and note there are no examples of a writing classified as prophetic that was not considered inspired scripture. Jörg Frey (2018) concludes that Jude at least viewed it as an authoritative text.

The attribution "Enoch the Seventh from Adam" is apparently itself a section heading taken from 1 Enoch (1 Enoch 60:8 and Jude 1:14a) and not from Genesis. Enoch's name appears in Luke 3:37 as being the father of Methuselah, in the patrilineage of Jesus that is traced back to Adam.

Enoch is referred to directly in the Epistle to the Hebrews. The epistle mentions that Enoch received testimony from God before his translation, which may be a reference to 1 Enoch.

It has also been suggested that the First Epistle of Peter (1 Peter 3:19–20) and the Second Epistle of Peter (2 Peter 2:4–5) make reference to some Enochian material. Other references also include Jude 1:6, and First Corinthians (1 Corinthians 11:10), according to Heinrich August Wilhelm Meyer. According to the Pulpit Commentary, Luke 1:19 may mirror Enoch, where archangels, including Gabriel, stand before the presence of the Lord. Bible scholar Simon Gathercole has indicated that Luke 10:18 may be drawing on eschatological passages and the cosmology of Enoch, with the primeval descent of Satan being related to the downfall of the Watchers. However, Gathercole critiques this view on the enigmatic verse, positing that the reference is instead a vision about a future event in the last days.

==== Reception ====
The Book of Enoch was considered as scripture in the Epistle of Barnabas (4:3) and by some of the early Church Fathers, such as Athenagoras, Clement of Alexandria, and Tertullian, who wrote c. 200 that the Jews had rejected the Book of Enoch because it purportedly contained prophecies about Jesus.

=== Church of Jesus Christ of Latter-day Saints ===
The Church of Jesus Christ of Latter-day Saints does not consider 1 Enoch to be part of its standard canon, although it believes that a purported "original" Book of Enoch was an inspired book. The Book of Moses, first published in the 1830s by this church, is part of its standard works and has a section that claims to contain extracts from the "original" Book of Enoch. This section has a number of similarities to 1 Enoch and other Enoch texts, including 2 Enoch, 3 Enoch, and The Book of Giants. The Enoch section of the Book of Moses is believed by the Church to contain extracts from "the ministry, teachings, and visions of Enoch", though it does not contain the entire Book of Enoch itself. The Church considers the portions of the other texts that match its Enoch excerpts to be inspired, while not rejecting but withholding judgment on the remainder.

== Names of the fallen angels ==
Some of the fallen angels that are given in 1 Enoch have other names, such as Ramel ('morning of God'), who becomes Azazel, and is also called Gadreel ('wall of God') in Chapter 68. Another example is that Araqiel ('Earth of God') becomes Aretstikapha ('world of distortion') in Chapter 68.

Azaz, as in Azazel, means strength, so the name Azazel can refer to 'strength of God'. This is also a key point in modern thought that Azazel was one of Lucifer’s chief leaders of the revolt against God.

Nathaniel Schmidt states, "the names of the angels apparently refer to their condition and functions before the fall," and lists the likely meanings of the angels' names in the Book of Enoch, noting that "the great majority of them are Aramaic."

The name suffix -el comes from the Hebrew text and the Lord’s name Emmanuel, (see list of names referring to El), and is used in the names of high-ranking angels. The archangels' names all include -el, such as Uriel ('flame of God') and Michael ('who is like God').

Gadreel (Hebrew: גדר האל, romanized: Gader ha-el, lit. 'Wall of God') is listed as one of the chiefs of the fallen Watchers. He is said to have been responsible for deceiving Eve. Schmidt lists the name as meaning 'the helper of God.'

== Enoch and contemporary theology ==
Enochic studies have traditionally been historical, focusing on the meanings of the text for its ancient audiences. 1 Enoch counts as Old Testament scripture in the Ethiopian Orthodox Tewahedo Church and has played a significant role in its theology, especially via the andemta tradition of interpretation. In 2015 a group of scholars from Ethiopia and other countries held meetings in Ethiopia and the UK to explore the significance of Enoch for contemporary theology. The initial outcome was a collection of essays published in 2017 on various theological topics, including justice, political theology, the environment, the identity of the Son of Man, suffering and evil.

== Editions, translations, and commentaries ==
- Margaret Barker. The Lost Prophet: The Book of Enoch and its influence on Christianity. (London: SPCK, 1998; Sheffield Phoenix Press, 2005)
- John Baty. The Book of Enoch the Prophet (London: Hatchard, 1839)
- Matthew Black (with James C. VanderKam). The Book of Enoch; or, 1 Enoch (Leiden: Brill, 1985) ISBN 90-04-07100-8
- Robert Henry Charles. The Book of Enoch (Oxford: Clarendon, 1893), translated from professor Dillmann's Ethiopic text - The Ethiopic version of the Book of Enoch (Oxford: Clarendon, 1906)
- Robert Henry Charles. The Book of Enoch, or 1 Enoch (Oxford: Clarendon, 1912)
- Charlesworth, James H. (1985) [1983]. The Old Testament Pseudepigrapha and the New Testament (PDF). CUP Archive. Vol. 1 The Old Testament pseudepigrapha. ISBN 1-56338-257-1. Archived from the original (PDF) on 10 August 2016 – via filbluz.ca.
- Sabino Chialà. Libro delle Parabole di Enoc (Brescia: Paideia, 1997) ISBN 88-394-0739-1
- Dillmann, A. (1851). Liber Henoch aethiopice [Ethiopian Book of Enoch] (in German). Leipzig, DE: Vogel.
- Hoffmann, A. G. (1833–1839). Das Buch Henoch [The Book of Enoch] (in German). Jena, DE: Croecker. — 2 vols
- Isaac, Ephraim (1983–1985). "1 (Ethiopic Apocalypse of) Enoch". In Charlesworth, James H. (ed.). The Old Testament Pseudepigrapha. Garden City, NY: Doubleday. ISBN 0-385-09630-5.
- Michael A. Knibb. The Ethiopic Book Of Enoch., 2 vols. (Oxford: Clarendon, 1978; repr. 1982)
- Michael Langlois. The First Manuscript of the Book of Enoch: An epigraphical and philological study of the Aramaic fragments of 4Q201 from Qumran (Paris: Cerf, 2008) ISBN 978-2-204-08692-9
- Richard Laurence. The Book of Enoch (Oxford: Parker, 1821)
- Laurence, Richard (1838). Libri Enoch prophetae versio aethiopica. Oxford: Parker – via JohnPratt.com.
- Nickelsburg, George W. E. (2001). 1 Enoch: A commentary. Minneapolis, MN: Fortress. ISBN 0-8006-6074-9.
- Nickelsburg, George W. E.; van der Kam, James C. (2004). 1 Enoch: A new translation. Minneapolis, MN: Fortress. ISBN 0-8006-3694-5.
- Nibley, H. (1986). Enoch the Prophet. Salt Lake City, UT: Deseret Book. ISBN 978-0-87579-047-3. Archived from the original on 28 March 2019 – via publications.mi.byu.edu.
- Olson, Daniel C. (2004). Enoch: A new translation. North Richland Hills, TX: Bibal. ISBN 0-941037-89-4.
- Schodde, G. H. (1882). The Book of Enoch translated from the Ethiopic with introduction and notes. Andover: Draper – via Holybooks.com.

== See also ==
- Aramaic Enoch Scroll
- Egregore
- El Shaddai: Ascension of the Metatron, a 2011 video game inspired by the Book of Enoch
- Jewish apocalypticism
- Non-canonical books referenced in the Bible
- Pseudopigrapha
- Seven heavens
