= Vigilius of Thapsus =

5th-century Bishop of Thapsus

Vigilius of Thapsus (before 484) also known as Vigilius Tapsensis, Vigilius Afer, or Vergil of Tapso, was a 5th-century Bishop of Thapsus in the province Byzacium, in what is now Tunisia, and as well as a theological writer and polemicist.

After the Synod of 484, he was probably banished by the Vandal king Huneric, who supported Arianism, for his Trinitarian beliefs, along with other Catholics. He may have fled to Constantinople.

== Works ==
He wrote one treatise, Adversus Nestorium et Eutychem Libri quinque pro defesione Synodi Chalcedonensis, often shortened to simply Contra Eutychetem, in five volumes, according to the Dictionary of Christian Biography and Literature. It provides a summary of the arguments against Eutychianism and defends Chalcedonian Christianity.

The Catholic Encyclopedia attributes another work to him, a series of dialogues: (Note: William Ramsay, in the Dictionary of Greek and Roman Biography and Mythology, states that the dialogues are two separate works, Altercatio sub nomine Athanasii adversus Arium and Altercationes tres, and notes that the former is often included in the corpus of Athanasius.) Contra Arianos, Sabellianos, et Photinianos; Athanasio, Ario, Sabellio, Photino et Probo judice, interlocutoribus. The dialog takes the form of a fictional debate among Arius, Sabellius, Photinus and a judge, Probus.

Other dialogues and treatises are said to be written by him; these include works often attributed to other authors (including Hydatius, Ambrose, and Augustine), possibly due to controversy. The following is a partial list:

- Contra Felicianum, de Unitate Trinitatis, ad Optatum
- Altercatio sub nomine Athanasii adversus Arium
- De Trinitate (Note: According to Smith, Jean-Jacques Chifflet attributed the work to Vigilius; later scholars have attributed the twelfth book of the work to Augustine and the first eight to Idacius.)
- De Trinitate adversus Varimadum
- Contra Palladium Arianum episcopum
