= Philip S. Alexander =

British Judaic scholar

- Born: 10 March 1947 (age 79)
- Awards: FBA

Education
- Education: Oxford University (MA, DPhil)

Philosophical work
- Era: 21st-century philosophy
- Region: Western philosophy
- Institutions: University of Manchester

Philip S. Alexander FBA (born 10 March 1947) is a British Judaic scholar and Professor of Post-Biblical Jewish Literature and co-director of the Centre for Jewish Studies in the University of Manchester.

== Books ==
- The Mystical Texts (Companion to the Dead Sea Scrolls), T&T Clark Ltd 2005
- The Targum of Canticles: Introduction, Translation, Apparatus and Notes. (The Aramaic Bible 17A), T&T Clark Ltd 2003
- Serekh ha-Yahad and Two Related Texts, Oxford: Clarendon Press 1998
- Textual Sources for the Study of Judaism, Edited and Translated by Philip Alexander, University of Chicago Press 1990
