= Biblical canon =

Texts regarded as part of the Bible

A biblical canon is a set of texts (also called "books") which a particular Jewish or Christian religious community regards as part of the Bible.

The English word canon comes from the Greek κανών kanōn, meaning 'rule' or 'measuring stick'. The word has been used to mean "the collection or list of books of the Bible accepted by the Christian Church as genuine and inspired" since the 14th century.

Various biblical canons have developed through debate and agreement on the part of the religious authorities of their respective faiths and denominations. Some books, such as the Jewish–Christian gospels, have been excluded from various canons altogether, but many disputed books are considered to be biblical apocrypha or deuterocanonical by many, while some denominations may consider them fully canonical. Differences exist between the Hebrew Bible and Christian biblical canons, although the majority of manuscripts are shared in common.

Different religious groups include different books in their biblical canons, in varying orders, and sometimes divide or combine books. The Jewish Tanakh (sometimes called the Hebrew Bible) contains 24 books divided into three parts: the five books of the Torah ('teaching'); the eight books of the Nevi'im ('prophets'); and the eleven books of Ketuvim ('writings'). It is composed mainly in Biblical Hebrew, with portions in Aramaic. The Septuagint (in Koine Greek), which closely resembles the Hebrew Bible but includes additional texts, is used as the Christian Greek Old Testament, at least in some liturgical contexts. The first part of Christian Bibles is the Old Testament, which contains, at minimum, the 24 books of the Hebrew Bible divided into 39 (Protestant) or 46 (Catholic [including deuterocanonical works]) books that are ordered differently. The second part is the New Testament, almost always containing 27 books: the four canonical gospels, Acts of the Apostles, 21 Epistles or letters and the Book of Revelation. The Catholic Church and Eastern Christian churches hold that certain deuterocanonical books and passages are part of the Old Testament canon. The Eastern Orthodox, Oriental Orthodox, Ethiopian Orthodox tewahdo and Assyrian churches may have differences in their lists of accepted books.

Some Christian groups have other canonical books (open canon) which are considered holy scripture but not part of the Bible.

== Jewish canons ==
=== Rabbinic Judaism ===
Rabbinic Judaism (Hebrew: יהדות רבנית) recognizes the twenty-four books of the Masoretic Text, commonly called the Tanakh (תַּנַ"ךְ) or Hebrew Bible. Evidence suggests that the process of canonization occurred between 200 BC and 200 AD, and a popular position is that the Torah was canonized c. 400 BC, the Prophets c. 200 BC, and the Writings c. 100 AD perhaps at a hypothetical Council of Jamnia—however, this position is increasingly criticised by modern scholars. According to Marc Zvi Brettler, the Jewish scriptures outside the Torah and the Prophets were fluid, with different groups seeing authority in different books.

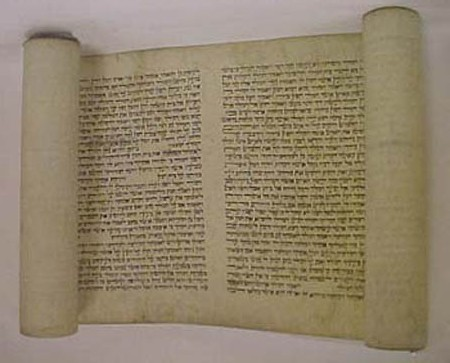
A scroll of the Book of Esther, one of the five megillot of the Tanakh

The Book of Deuteronomy includes a prohibition against adding or subtracting (4:2, 12:32) which might apply to the book itself (i.e. a "closed book", a prohibition against future scribal editing) or to the instruction received by Moses on Mount Sinai. The book of 2 Maccabees, itself not a part of the Jewish canon, describes Nehemiah (c. 400 BC) as having "founded a library and collected books about the kings and prophets, and the writings of David, and letters of kings about votive offerings" (2:13–15).

The Book of Nehemiah suggests that the priest-scribe Ezra brought the Torah back from Babylon to Jerusalem and the Second Temple (8–9) around the same time period. Both 1 and 2 Maccabees suggest that Judas Maccabeus (c. 167 BC) likewise collected sacred books (3:42–50, 2:13–15, 15:6–9), indeed some scholars argue that the Hasmonean dynasty (140–37 BC) fixed the Jewish canon.

=== Samaritan canon ===
Another version of the Torah, in the Samaritan alphabet, also exists. This text is associated with Samaritanism and its adherents, the Samaritans (Hebrew: שומרונים; Arabic: السامريون), a people whose emergence as a distinct ethno-religious group began with the Assyrian conquest of Samaria in 722 BC.

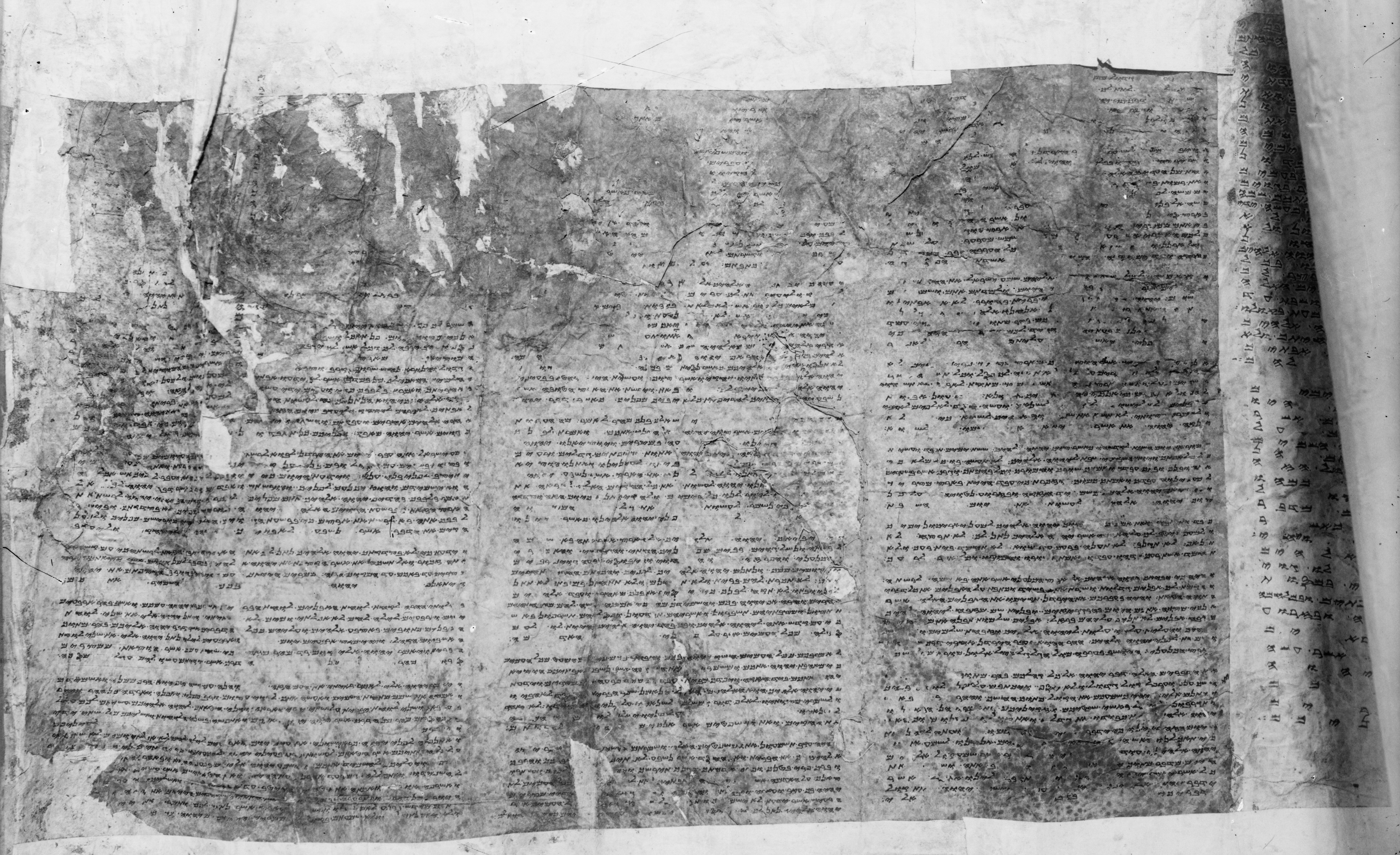
The Abisha Scroll, the oldest scroll among the Samaritans in Nablus

The Samaritan Pentateuch's relationship to the Masoretic Text is still disputed. Some differences are minor, such as the ages of different people mentioned in genealogy, while others are major, such as a commandment to be monogamous, which appears only in the Samaritan version. More importantly, the Samaritan text also diverges from the Masoretic in stating that Moses received the Ten Commandments on Mount Gerizim—not Mount Sinai—and that it is upon Mount Gerizim that sacrifices to God should be made—not in Jerusalem. Scholars nonetheless consult the Samaritan version when trying to determine the meaning of text of the original Pentateuch, as well as to trace the development of text-families. Some scrolls among the Dead Sea Scrolls have been identified as proto-Samaritan Pentateuch text-type.

Samaritans consider the Torah to be inspired scripture, but do not accept any other parts of the Bible—probably a position also held by the Sadducees. They did not expand their canon by adding any Samaritan compositions. There is a Samaritan Book of Joshua; however, while it is held in high regard, it is not considered to be scripture. Other non-canonical Samaritan religious texts include the Memar Markah ('Teaching of Markah') and the Defter (Prayerbook)—both from the 4th century or later.

The people of the remnants of the Samaritans in modern-day Israel and Palestine retain their version of the Torah as fully and authoritatively canonical. They regard themselves as the true "guardians of the Law". This assertion is only reinforced by the claim of the Samaritan community in Nablus (an area traditionally associated with the ancient city of Shechem) to possess the oldest existing copy of the Torah—one that they believe to have been penned by Abisha, a grandson of Aaron.

== Christian canons ==
The Council of Trent (1545–1563) was an ecumenical council that explicitly laid out the 73-book canon for the Catholic Church, consisting of 46 books in the Old Testament and 27 books in the New Testament. Prior to that council, the collection of scriptures was affirmed by such regional councils as the Council of Rome (382), (Note: Whether the Council of Rome even made note of any Church canon is questionable, even the historicity of the Damasine List in the Gelasian Decree. This could be misleading.) Synod of Hippo (393), two of the Councils of Carthage (397 and 419 respectively), and the Council of Florence (1431–1449).

The canons of the Church of England and English Presbyterians were conclusively decided by the Thirty-Nine Articles (1563) and the Westminster Confession of Faith (1647), respectively. The Synod of Jerusalem (1672) established additional canons that are widely accepted throughout the Eastern Orthodox Church.

Various forms of Jewish Christianity persisted until around the fifth century, and canonized very different sets of books, including Jewish–Christian gospels which have been lost to history. These and many other works are classified as New Testament apocrypha by scholars.

The Old and New Testament canons did not develop independently of each other and most primary sources for the canon specify both Old and New Testament books. For the biblical scripture for both Testaments, canonically accepted in major traditions of Christendom, see § Canons of various traditions.

=== Purpose of canon ===
For churches which espouse sola scriptura it is necessary and critical to have a clear and complete list of the canonical books. For churches which espouse sacred Tradition or Magisterium as well as Scripture, the issue can be more organic, as the Bible is an artifact of the church rather than vice versa.

Theologian William J. Abraham has suggested that in the primitive church and patristic period the "primary purpose in canonizing Scripture was to provide an authorized list of books for use in worship. The primary setting envisaged for the use of Scripture was not that of the science of theology, or that of the debates of scholars, but the spiritual nourishment of the people of God...the factor which ultimately carried the day (for what was in the canon) was actual usage in the Church."

=== Early Church ===
==== Earliest Christian communities ====
The Early Church used the Old Testament, namely the Septuagint (LXX) among Greek speakers, with a canon perhaps as found in the Bryennios List or Melito's canon. The Apostles did not otherwise leave a defined set of new scriptures; instead, the New Testament developed over time.

Writings attributed to the apostles circulated among the earliest Christian communities. Possible apostolicity was a strong argument used to suggest the canonical status of a book.

The author of the Second Epistle of Peter implies that Pauline epistles were part of the scriptures that the early church knew and read: "... So also our beloved brother Paul wrote to you... There are some things in them hard to understand, which the ignorant and unstable twist to their own destruction, as they do the other scriptures" (2 Peter 3:15-16)

The Pauline epistles were circulating in collected forms by the end of the 1st century AD. Justin Martyr, in the early 2nd century, mentions the "memoirs of the Apostles", which Christians (Greek: Χριστιανός) called "gospels", and which were considered to be authoritatively equal to the Old Testament.

==== Marcion's list ====
Marcion of Sinope was the first Christian leader in recorded history (though later considered heretical) to propose and delineate a uniquely Christian canon (c. 140). This included 10 epistles from Paul, as well as an edited version of the Gospel of Luke, which today is known as the Gospel of Marcion. By doing this, he established a particular way of looking at religious texts that persists in Christian thought today.

After Marcion, Christians began to divide texts into those that aligned well with the canon (meaning 'measuring line', 'rule', or 'principle') of accepted theological thought and those that promoted heresy. This played a major role in finalizing the structure of the collection of works called the Bible. It has been proposed that the initial impetus for the proto-orthodox Christian project of canonization flowed from opposition to the list produced by Marcion.

==== Apostolic Fathers ====
A four-gospel canon (the Tetramorph) was asserted by Irenaeus (c. 130 – c. 202 AD) in the following quote:

It is not possible that the gospels can be either more or fewer in number than they are. For, since there are four-quarters of the earth in which we live, and four universal winds, while the church is scattered throughout all the world, and the 'pillar and ground' of the church is the gospel and the spirit of life, it is fitting that she should have four pillars breathing out immortality on every side, and vivifying men afresh [...] Therefore the gospels are in accord with these things ... For the living creatures are quadriform and the gospel is quadriform [...] These things being so, all who destroy the form of the gospel are vain, unlearned, and also audacious; those [I mean] who represent the aspects of the gospel as being either more in number than as aforesaid, or, on the other hand, fewer.

Irenaeus additionally quotes from passages of all the books that would later be put in the New Testament canon except the Letter to Philemon, II Peter, III John, and the Epistle of Jude in Against Heresies, refers to the Shepherd of Hermas as "scripture" and appears to regard I Clement as authoritative.

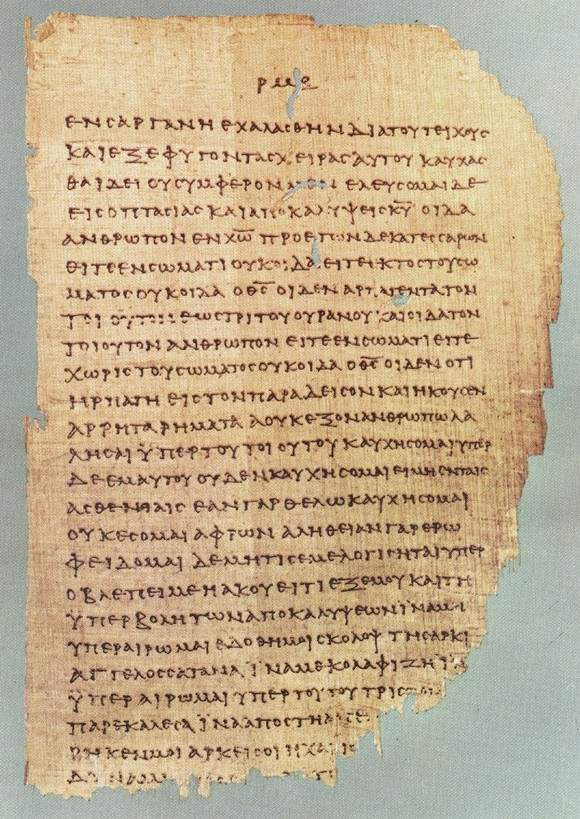
A manuscript page from P46, an early 3rd-century collection of Pauline epistles

By the early 3rd century, Christian theologians like Origen of Alexandria may have been using—or at least were familiar with—the same 27 books found in modern New Testament editions, though there were still disputes over the canonicity of some of the writings (see also Antilegomena). Likewise by 200, the Muratorian fragment shows that there existed a set of Christian writings somewhat similar to what is now the New Testament, which included four gospels and argued against objections to them. Thus, while there was a good measure of debate in the Early Church over the New Testament canon, the major writings were accepted by almost all Christians by the middle of the 3rd century.

=== Eastern Church ===
==== Alexandrian Fathers ====
Origen of Alexandria (184/85–253/54), an early scholar involved in the codification of the biblical canon, had a thorough education both in Christian theology and in pagan philosophy, but was posthumously condemned at the Second Council of Constantinople in 553 since some of his teachings were considered to be heresy. Origen's canon included all of the books in the current New Testament canon except for four books: James, 2nd Peter, and the 2nd and 3rd epistles of John.

He also included the Shepherd of Hermas which was later rejected. The religious scholar Bruce Metzger described Origen's efforts, saying "The process of canonization represented by Origen proceeded by way of selection, moving from many candidates for inclusion to fewer."

In his Easter letter of 367, Patriarch Athanasius of Alexandria gave a list of exactly the same books that would become the New Testament–27 book–proto-canon, and used the phrase "being canonized" (kanonizomena) in regard to them.

==== Fifty Bibles of Constantine ====
In 331, Constantine I commissioned Eusebius to deliver fifty Bibles for the Church of Constantinople. Athanasius recorded Alexandrian scribes around 340 preparing Bibles for Constans. Little else is known, though there is plenty of speculation. For example, it is speculated that this may have provided motivation for canon lists, and that Codex Vaticanus and Codex Sinaiticus are examples of these Bibles. Those codices contain almost a full version of the Septuagint; Vaticanus lacks only 1–3 Maccabees and Sinaiticus lacks 2–3 Maccabees, 1 Esdras, Baruch and Letter of Jeremiah. Together with the Peshitta and Codex Alexandrinus, these are the earliest extant Christian Bibles.

There is no evidence among the canons of the First Council of Nicaea of any determination on the canon; however, Jerome (347–420), in his Prologue to Judith, makes the claim that the Book of Judith was "found by the Nicene Council to have been counted among the number of the Sacred Scriptures".

==== Eastern canons ====
The Eastern Churches had, in general, a weaker feeling than those in the West for the necessity of making sharp delineations with regard to the canon. They were more conscious of the gradation of spiritual quality among the books that they accepted (for example, the classification of Eusebius, see also Antilegomena) and were less often disposed to assert that the books which they rejected possessed no spiritual quality at all. For example, the Trullan Synod of 691–692, which Pope Sergius I (in office 687–701) rejected (see also Pentarchy), endorsed the following lists of canonical writings: the Apostolic Canons (c. 385), the Synod of Laodicea (c. 363), the Third Synod of Carthage (c. 397), and the 39th Festal Letter of Athanasius (367). And yet, these lists do not agree. Similarly, the New Testament canons of the Syriac, Armenian, Egyptian Coptic and Ethiopian Churches all have minor differences, yet five of these Churches are part of the same communion and hold the same theological beliefs.

==== Peshitta ====
The Peshitta is the standard version of the Bible for churches in the Syriac tradition. Most of the deuterocanonical books of the Old Testament are found in the Syriac, and the Wisdom of Sirach is held to have been translated from the Hebrew and not from the Septuagint. This New Testament, originally excluding certain disputed books (2 Peter, 2 John, 3 John, Jude, Revelation), had become a standard by the early 5th century. The five excluded books were added in the Harklean Version (616) of Thomas of Harqel.

The standard United Bible Societies 1905 edition of the New Testament of the Peshitta was based on editions prepared by Syriacists Philip E. Pusey (d. 1880), George Gwilliam (d. 1914) and John Gwyn. All twenty seven books of the common western New Testament are included in this British & Foreign Bible Society's 1905 Peshitta edition.

=== Western Church ===
==== Latin Fathers ====
The first Council that accepted the present Catholic canon (the Canon of Trent of 1546) may have been the Synod of Hippo Regius, held in North Africa in 393. A brief summary of the acts was read at and accepted by the Council of Carthage (397) and also the Council of Carthage (419). These Councils took place under the authority of Augustine of Hippo (354–430), who regarded the canon as already closed.

Augustine of Hippo declared without qualification that one is to "prefer those that are received by all Catholic Churches to those which some of them do not receive" (On Christian Doctrines 2.12). In the same passage, Augustine asserted that these dissenting churches should be outweighed by the opinions of "the more numerous and weightier churches", which would include Eastern Churches, the prestige of which Augustine stated moved him to include the Book of Hebrews among the canonical writings, though he had reservation about its authorship.

Philip Schaff says that "the council of Hippo in 393, and the third (according to another reckoning the sixth) council of Carthage in 397, under the influence of Augustine, who attended both, fixed the catholic canon of the Holy Scriptures, including the Apocrypha of the Old Testament, ... This decision of the transmarine church however, was subject to ratification; and the concurrence of the Roman see it received when Innocent I and Gelasius I (414) repeated the same index of biblical books. This canon remained undisturbed till the sixteenth century, and was sanctioned by the council of Trent at its fourth session." According to Lee Martin McDonald, the Revelation was added to the list in 419. These councils were convened under the influence of Augustine of Hippo, who regarded the canon as already closed.

Pope Damasus I's Council of Rome in 382 (if the Decretum is correctly associated with it) issued a biblical canon identical to that mentioned above. Likewise, Damasus' commissioning of the Latin Vulgate edition of the Bible, c. 383, proved instrumental in the fixation of the canon in the West.

In a letter (c. 405) to Exsuperius of Toulouse, a Gallic bishop, Pope Innocent I mentioned the sacred books that were already received in the canon. When bishops and Councils spoke on the matter of the Biblical canon, however, they were not defining something new, but instead "were ratifying what had already become the mind of the Church". Thus from the 4th century there existed unanimity in the West concerning the New Testament canon as it is today, with the exception of the Book of Revelation. In the 5th century the East too, with a few exceptions, came to accept the Book of Revelation and thus came into harmony on the matter of the New Testament canon.

As the primary canon crystallised, non-canonical texts fell into relative disfavour and neglect.

==== Council of Florence ====
The contents page in a complete 80 book King James Bible, listing "The Books of the Old Testament", "The Books called Apocrypha", and "The Books of the New Testament"

Before the Protestant Reformation, the Council of Florence (1439–1443) took place. With the approval of this ecumenical council, Pope Eugenius IV (in office 1431–1447) issued several papal bulls (decrees) with a view to restoring the Eastern churches, which the Catholic Church considered as schismatic bodies, into communion with Rome. Catholic theologians regard these documents as infallible statements of Catholic doctrine. The Decretum pro Jacobitis contains a complete list of the books received by the Catholic Church as inspired, but omits the terms "canon" and "canonical". The Council of Florence therefore taught the inspiration of all the Scriptures, but did not formally pronounce itself on canonicity.

==== Luther's canon and apocrypha ====
Martin Luther (1483–1546) proposed that the genuine mark of canonical material was that it preached Christ. This allowed him to relegate books (including ones that may not have supported his theology) to a secondary status.

Luther moved seven Old Testament books (Tobit, Judith, 1–2 Maccabees, Book of Wisdom, Sirach, and Baruch) into a section he called the "Apocrypha, that are books which are not considered equal to the Holy Scriptures, but are useful and good to read".

All of these apocrypha are called anagignoskomena by the Eastern Orthodox Church per the Synod of Jerusalem.

As with the Lutheran Churches, the Anglican Communion accepts "the Apocrypha for instruction in life and manners, but not for the establishment of doctrine", and many "lectionary readings in The Book of Common Prayer are taken from the Apocrypha", with these lessons being "read in the same ways as those from the Old Testament". The Protestant Apocrypha contains three books (3 Esdras, 4 Esdras and the Prayer of Manasseh) that are accepted by many Eastern Orthodox Churches and Oriental Orthodox Churches as canonical, but are regarded as non-canonical by the Catholic Church and are therefore not included in modern Catholic Bibles.

Anabaptists use the Luther Bible, which contains the intertestamental books; Amish wedding ceremonies include "the retelling of the marriage of Tobias and Sarah in the Apocrypha". The fathers of Anabaptism, such as Menno Simons, quoted "them [the Apocrypha] with the same authority and nearly the same frequency as books of the Hebrew Bible" and the texts regarding the martyrdoms under Antiochus IV in 1 Maccabees and 2 Maccabees are held in high esteem by the Anabaptists, who historically faced persecution.

Lutheran and Anglican lectionaries continue to include readings from the Apocrypha.

==== Council of Trent ====
In response to Martin Luther's demands, the Council of Trent on 8 April 1546 approved the present Catholic Bible canon, which includes the deuterocanonical books, and the decision was confirmed by an anathema by vote (24 yea, 15 nay, 16 abstain). The council confirmed the same list as produced at the Council of Florence in 1442, Augustine's 397–419 Councils of Carthage, and probably Damasus' 382 Council of Rome. The Old Testament books that had been rejected by Luther were later termed "deuterocanonical", not indicating a lesser degree of inspiration, but a later time of final approval. The Sixto-Clementine Vulgate contained in the Appendix several books considered as apocryphal by the council: Prayer of Manasseh, 3 Esdras, and 4 Esdras. The Canon of the New Testament, like that of the Old, is the result of a development, of a process at once stimulated by disputes with doubters, both within and without the Church, and retarded by certain obscurities and natural hesitations, and which did not reach its final term until the dogmatic definition of the Tridentine Council.

==== Protestant confessions ====
Several Protestant confessions of faith identify the 27 books of the New Testament canon by name, including the French Confession of Faith (1559), the Belgic Confession (1561), and the Westminster Confession of Faith (1647). The Second Helvetic Confession (1562), affirms "both Testaments to be the true Word of God" and appealing to Augustine's De Civitate Dei, it rejected the canonicity of the Apocrypha. The Thirty-Nine Articles, issued by the Church of England in 1563, names the books of the Old Testament, but not the New Testament. The Belgic Confession and the Westminster Confession named the 39 books in the Old Testament and, apart from the aforementioned New Testament books, expressly rejected the canonicity of any others.

The Lutheran Epitome of the Formula of Concord of 1577 declared that the prophetic and apostolic Scriptures comprised the Old and New Testaments alone. Luther himself did not accept the canonicity of the Apocrypha although he believed that its books were "Not Held Equal to the Scriptures, but Are Useful and Good to Read". Lutheran and Anglican lectionaries continue to include readings from the Apocrypha.

==== Other apocrypha ====
Various books that were never canonized by any church, but are known to have existed in antiquity, are similar to the New Testament and often claim apostolic authorship, are known as the New Testament apocrypha. Some of these writings have been cited as scripture by early Christians, but since the fifth century a widespread consensus has emerged limiting the New Testament to the 27 books of the modern canon. Thus Roman Catholic, Eastern Orthodox and Protestant churches generally do not view these New Testament apocrypha as part of the Bible.

== Canons of various Jewish and Christian traditions ==
=== Old Testament ===
Another set of books, largely written during the intertestamental period, are called the deuterocanon ('second canon') by Catholics, the deuterocanon or anagignoskomena ('worthy of reading') by Eastern Orthodox Churches, and the biblical apocrypha ('hidden things') by Protestants. These are works recognized by the Catholic, Eastern Orthodox, and Oriental Orthodox Churches as being part of scripture (and thus deuterocanonical rather than apocryphal), but Protestants do not recognize them as divinely inspired. Some Protestant Bibles—especially the English King James Bible and the Lutheran Bible—include an "Apocrypha" section.

Many denominations recognize deuterocanonical books as good, but not on the level of the other books of the Bible. Anglicanism considers the apocrypha worthy of being "read for example of life" but not to be used "to establish any doctrine". Luther made a parallel statement in calling them "not considered equal to the Holy Scriptures, but [...] useful and good to read."

Additionally, while the books of Jubilees and Enoch are fairly well known among western scholars, 1, 2, and 3 Meqabyan are not. The three books of Meqabyan are often called the "Ethiopian Maccabees", but are completely different in content from the books of Maccabees that are known or have been canonized in other traditions. Finally, the Book of Joseph ben Gurion, or Pseudo-Josephus, is a history of the Jewish people thought to be based upon the writings of Josephus. The Ethiopic version (Zëna Ayhud) has eight parts and is included in the Orthodox Tewahedo broader canon.

Some ancient copies of the Peshitta used in the Syriac tradition include 2 Baruch (divided into the Apocalypse of Baruch and the Letter of Baruch; some copies only include the Letter) and the non-canonical Psalms 152–155.

The Ethiopian Tewahedo church accepts all of the deuterocanonical books of Catholicism and anagignoskomena of Eastern Orthodoxy except for the four Books of Maccabees. It accepts the 39 protocanonical books along with the following books, called the "narrow canon". The enumeration of books in the Ethiopic Bible varies greatly between different authorities and printings.

Protestants and Catholics use the Masoretic Text of the Jewish Tanakh as the textual basis for their translations of the protocanonical books (those accepted as canonical by both Jews and all Christians), with various changes derived from a multiplicity of other ancient sources (such as the Septuagint, the Vulgate, the Dead Sea Scrolls, etc.), while generally using the Septuagint and Vulgate, now supplemented by the ancient Hebrew and Aramaic manuscripts, as the textual basis for the deuterocanonical books.

Eastern Orthodoxy uses the Septuagint (translated in the 3rd century BC) as the textual basis for the entire Old Testament in both protocanonical and deuterocanonical books—to use both in the Greek for liturgical purposes, and as the basis for translations into the vernacular. Most of the quotations (300 of 400) of the Old Testament in the New Testament, while differing more or less from the version presented by the Masoretic text, align with that of the Septuagint.

Marcionism rejects the Old Testament entirely; Marcion considered the Old Testament and New Testament gods to be different entities.

==== Old Testament table ====
This table lists seventy-four books and additions.

				Judaism	Samaritanism	Western Christian tradition				Eastern Orthodox tradition			Oriental Orthodox tradition				
Books (Note: Although many books of the Jewish apocrypha have been variously recognized by different Christian communities, those that are not embraced by any tradition are excluded here. The order of some books varies among canons. The Talmud in Bava Batra 14b gives its own order for the books in Nevi'im and Ketuvim. This order is also quoted in Mishneh Torah Hilchot Sefer Torah 7:15. The order of the books of the Torah are universal through all denominations of Judaism, Samaritanism, and Christianity. The table uses the spellings and names present in modern editions of the Bible, such as the New American Bible Revised Edition, Revised Standard Version and English Standard Version. The spelling and names in both the 1609–1610 Douay Old Testament (and in the 1582 Rheims New Testament) and the 1749 revision by Bishop Challoner (the edition currently in print used by many Catholics, and the source of traditional Catholic spellings in English) and in the Septuagint differ from those spellings and names used in modern editions that derive from the Hebrew Masoretic text. This is generally due to derivation from transliterations of names used in the Latin Vulgate in the case of Catholicism, and from transliterations of the Greek Septuagint in the case of the Orthodox (as opposed to derivation of translations, instead of transliterations, of Hebrew titles) such Ecclesiasticus (DRC) instead of Sirach (LXX) or Ben Sira (Hebrew), Paralipomenon (Greek, meaning "things omitted") instead of Chronicles, Sophonias instead of Zephaniah, Noe instead of Noah, Henoch instead of Enoch, Messias instead of Messiah, Sion instead of Zion, etc. The King James Version references some of these books by the traditional spelling when referring to them in the New Testament, such as "Esaias" (for Isaiah). In the spirit of ecumenism more recent Catholic translations (e.g., the New American Bible, Jerusalem Bible, and ecumenical translations used by Catholics, such as the Revised Standard Version Catholic Edition) use the same "standardized" (King James Version) spellings and names as Protestant Bibles (e.g., 1 Chronicles, as opposed to the Douay 1 Paralipomenon, 1–2 Samuel and 1–2 Kings, instead of 1–4 Kings) in the protocanonicals.)	Language	Hebrew order	Christian order	Hebrew Bible (Note: The canon followed by the Masoretic Text is adhered to by modern Jews and is known as the Protocanon among Christians, but "it is now recognized that only 2 Maccabees, and additions to Esther (13,1) were written in Greek. And the notion of Greek: diaspora/Hebrew: Palestine in matters of canon has been controverted by clear evidence of the circulation of the Septuagint in Palestine..." see: Sundberg Jr, Albert C. "The" Old Testament": A Christian Canon." The Catholic Biblical Quarterly (1968): 143-155, p.145.)	Samaritan Pentateuch	Latin Catholicism (Note: The Roman Catholic Canon as represented in this table reflects the Latin tradition. Some Eastern Rite churches who are in fellowship with the Roman Catholic Church may have different books in their canons.)	Anglican (Note: Articles of Religion 1571, The Church of England. Available at: https://www.churchofengland.org/prayer-and-worship/worship-texts-and-resources/book-common-prayer/articles-religion#VII (Accessed: 07 November 2023).)	Lutheran (Note: Edmon L. Gallagher and John D. Meade. The biblical canon lists from early Christianity: Texts and analysis. (Oxford: OUP, 2017), pp.xx-xxii.)	Free Churches and Other Protestants (Note: The term "Nonconformist Protestant" is used loosely here to include most Western non-Roman Catholic churches apart from Evangelical Lutherans and Anglicans (Lutherans and Anglicans have historically included intertestamental Apocryphal books between the Old Testament and New Testament, employing readings from the same in their lectionaries). Most Christians in this category (e.g. Reformed, Baptists, Methodists and Plymouth Brethren) include only the protocanon, but there are "churches that include the Apocrypha or Deuterocanonical writings in their Bibles [which] generally follow the R-H LXX edition", see: Lee Martin McDonald, "A Canonical History of the Old Testament Apocrypha." The Oxford Handbook of the Apocrypha (2021): 24, p.45.)	Greek Orthodox (Note: Edmon L. Gallagher and John D. Meade. The biblical canon lists from early Christianity: Texts and analysis. (Oxford: OUP, 2017), pp.xx-xxii.)	Russian Orthodox (Note: "The Old Testament, as it functions in the Russian Orthodox Church, contains the thirty-nine books which are part of what other traditions call the Protocanon, as well as eleven other books...[:] "2 Ездры" (3 Esdras in the Vulgate; 'Εσδρας Α' in the Septuagint), Tobit, Judith, Wisdom of Solomon, Sirach (Ecclesiasticus), Letter of Jeremiah, Baruch, 1, 2, and 3 Maccabees, and finally "3 Ездры" (4 Esdras in the Vulgate). To these books should be added the non-canonical sections of Daniel (i.e., Song of the Three Young Men, Susanna, Bel and the Dragon), Esther, Psalms (i.e., Ps 151), and the Prayer of Manasseh placed at the end of 2 Chronicles. These sections are not included separately, but as part of these respective books." See: Lénart J. De Regt, "Canon and Biblical Text in the Slavonic Tradition in Russia." The Bible Translator 67.2 (2016): 223-239, pp.223-224.)	Georgian Orthodox (Note: Anna Kharanauli, "The Georgian Canon." Textual history of the Bible; Volume 2A: The deuterocanonical scriptures: Overview articles (2020): 258-268.)	Armenian Apostolic (Note: The growth and development of the Armenian Biblical canon is complex. Extra-canonical Old Testament books appear in historical canon lists and recensions that are either exclusive to this tradition, or where they do exist elsewhere, never achieved the same status. See: Michael E. Stone, "Armenian Canon Lists I—the Council of Partaw (768 CE)." Harvard Theological Review 66.4 (1973): 479-486; Michael E. Stone, "Armenian Canon Lists II—The Stichometry of Anania of Shirak (c. 615-c. 690 CE.)." Harvard Theological Review 68.3-4 (1975): 253-260. Michael E. Stone, "Armenian Canon Lists III—The Lists of Mechitar of Ayrivankʿ (c. 1285 CE)." Harvard Theological Review 69.3-4 (1976): 289-300 Michael E. Stone, "Armenian Canon Lists IV—The List of Gregory of Tatʿew (14th Century)." Harvard Theological Review 72.3-4 (1979): 237-244; Michael E. Stone, "Armenian Canon Lists V—Anonymous Texts." Harvard Theological Review 83.2 (1990): 141-161; Michael E. Stone, "Armenian Canon Lists VI—Hebrew Names and Other Attestations." Harvard Theological Review 94.4 (2001): 477-491. Michael E. Stone, "Armenian Canon Lists VII: The Poetic List of Aṙak 'el of Siwnik '(d. 1409)." Harvard Theological Review 104.3 (2011): 367-379.)	Coptic Orthodox	Syriac Orthodox (Note: "The disputed books are often grouped together at the end of their OT canon (cf. ms. Sinai Syr. 10) including 1-4 Maccabees, Judith, Wisdom, 3 Esdras, and Ben Sirach, but the Syrian canon varies in the three Bibles from which subsequent editions are based." See: Lee Martin McDonald, "A Canonical History of the Old Testament Apocrypha." The Oxford Handbook of the Apocrypha (2021): 24, p.45.)	Ethiopian Orthodox Tewahedo	Church of the East (Note: The Church of the East "persisted in using the shorter canon" and the Syriac Deuterocanonicals were not included in Lamsa's translation, though he admitted that "Apocryphal books are [usually] included in the text, they are looked upon as a sacred literature, even though they are not as_commonly used as the others." See: Ron Grove, Canon and community: authority in the history of religions University of California, Santa Barbara, 1983, p.160. It should also be noted that "...conversion to Christianity started after most books were translated, but before the translation of Ezra, Nehemiah and Chronicles... When later converts brought the last books, "there were those in the church who considered that the limits of the Old Testament in Syriac had already been defined" (Weitzman, 1999, p.261). These last books never attained the same status in the Church of the East as the earlier books of the Old Testament." See: Henk Prenger, "The History of the Church of the East." Biola ISCL 742 (2010), p,54)
					Torah			Pentateuch									
Genesis	Hebrew	1	1	Yes	Yes	Yes	Yes	Yes	Yes	Yes	Yes	Yes	Yes	Yes	Yes	Yes	Yes
Exodus	Hebrew	2	2	Yes	Yes	Yes	Yes	Yes	Yes	Yes	Yes	Yes	Yes	Yes	Yes	Yes	Yes
Leviticus	Hebrew	3	3	Yes	Yes	Yes	Yes	Yes	Yes	Yes	Yes	Yes	Yes	Yes	Yes	Yes	Yes
Numbers	Hebrew	4	4	Yes	Yes	Yes	Yes	Yes	Yes	Yes	Yes	Yes	Yes	Yes	Yes	Yes	Yes
Deuteronomy	Hebrew	5	5	Yes	Yes	Yes	Yes	Yes	Yes	Yes	Yes	Yes	Yes	Yes	Yes	Yes	Yes
				Nevi'im Rishonim		Historical books											
Joshua	Hebrew	6	6	Yes	No	Yes; Josue	Yes	Yes	Yes	Yes	Yes	Yes	Yes	Yes	Yes	Yes	Yes
Samaritan Book of Joshua	Arabic			No	No (elevated status) (Note: The Samaritan Book of Joshua has an elevated status within the Samaritan tradition, but is not considered canon.)	No	No	No	No	No	No	No	No	No	No	No	No
Judges	Hebrew	7	7	Yes	No	Yes	Yes	Yes	Yes	Yes	Yes	Yes	Yes	Yes	Yes	Yes	Yes
Ruth	Hebrew	18	8	Yes (part of Ketuvim)	No	Yes	Yes	Yes	Yes	Yes	Yes	Yes	Yes	Yes	Yes	Yes	Yes
1 and 2 Samuel	Hebrew	8	9 and 10	Yes	No	Yes; 1 and 2 Kings	Yes	Yes	Yes	Yes; 1 and 2 Kingdoms	Yes; 1 and 2 Kingdoms	Yes; 1 and 2 Kingdoms	Yes; 1 and 2 Kingdoms	Yes	Yes	Yes	Yes
1 and 2 Kings	Hebrew	9	11 and 12	Yes	No	Yes; 3 and 4 Kings	Yes	Yes	Yes	Yes; 3 and 4 Kingdoms	Yes; 3 and 4 Kingdoms	Yes; 3 and 4 Kingdoms	Yes; 3 and 4 Kingdoms	Yes	Yes	Yes	Yes
1 and 2 Chronicles	Hebrew	24	13 and 14	Yes (part of Ketuvim)	No	Yes; 1 and 2 Paralipomenon	Yes	Yes	Yes	Yes; 1 and 2 Paralipomenon	Yes; 1 and 2 Paralipomenon	Yes; 1 and 2 Paralipomenon	Yes	Yes	Yes	Yes	Yes
Prayer of Manasseh	Greek (majority view) or Semitic (minority view)		28	No	No	No – (inc. in Appendix in Clementine Vulgate)	No (Apocrypha) (Note: The Luther Bible includes the following intertestamental Apocrypha books: Judith, the Book of Wisdom, Tobit, Sirach, Baruch, the Letter of Jeremiah, 1 & 2 Maccabees, the Additions to Esther and the Additions to Daniel. The English Apocrypha includes the Prayer of Manasseh, 1 & 2 Esdras, the Additions to Esther, Tobit, Judith, 1 & 2 Maccabees, the Book of Wisdom, Sirach, Baruch, the Letter of Jeremiah, and the Additions to Daniel. When comparing the Anglican Apocrypha and the Lutheran Apocrypha, the Lutheran Apocrypha omits from this list of intertestamental books: 1 & 2 Esdras. Some Protestant Bibles include 3 Maccabees as part of the Apocrypha.)	No (Apocrypha)	No (Apocrypha) (Note: A number of nonconformist churches within Protestantism (e.g. Baptists, Methodists and Plymouth Brethren)—as it is presented here—do not include the Apocrypha in their Bibles. Nevertheless, the Apocrypha/Deuterocanonical books may be included in various translations of the Bibles that are often used by nonconformist Protestants, such as the: CEB, ESV, KJV, MSG, NLT, NEB, NRSV, REB, and RSV publications or included in CE (Catholic Edition) versions of these Bibles.)	No (part of Odes) (Note: The Prayer of Manasseh is included as part of the Book of Odes, which follows the Psalms in the Septuagint. The rest of the Book of Odes consists of passages found elsewhere in the Bible. There is no book of Odes in the modern Orthodox Bible. The Prayer of Manasseh may also be found at the end of 2 Chronicles (2 Paralipomenon).)	Yes (part of 2 Paralipomenon)	Yes (part of 2 Paralipomenon)	Yes	Yes	No (?) (Liturgical)	Yes (part of 2 Chronicles)	No (?) (Liturgical)
Ezra (1 Ezra)	Hebrew and Aramaic	23	16	Yes (part of Ketuvim)	No	Yes; 1 Esdras	Yes	Yes	Yes	Yes; Esdras B'	Yes; 1 Esdras	Yes; 1 Ezra	Yes	Yes	Yes	Yes	Yes
Nehemiah (2 Ezra)	Hebrew	23	17	Yes (part of Ketuvim)	No	Yes; 2 Esdras	Yes	Yes	Yes	Yes; Esdras Γ' or Neemias	Yes; Neemias	Yes; Neemias	Yes	Yes	Yes	Yes	Yes
1 Esdras (3 Ezra)	Aramaic and Hebrew (majority view)			No	No	No – (inc. in Appendix in Clementine Vulgate as 3 Esdras.)	No; 1 Esdras (Apocrypha)	No	No (Apocrypha)	Yes; Esdras A'	Yes; 2 Esdras	Yes; 2 Ezra	Yes	No – inc. in some mss.	No – inc. in some mss.	Yes; Ezra Kali	No – inc. in some mss.
2 Esdras 3–14 (4 Ezra or Apocalypsis of Esdras) (Note: In many eastern Bibles, the Apocalypse of Ezra is not an exact match to the longer Latin Esdras–2 Esdras in KJV or 4 Esdras in the Vulgate—which includes a Latin prologue (5 Ezra) and epilogue (6 Ezra). However, a degree of uncertainty continues to exist here, and it is certainly possible that the full text—including the prologue and epilogue—appears in Bibles and Biblical manuscripts used by some of these eastern traditions. Also of note is the fact that many Latin versions are missing verses 7:36–7:106. (A more complete explanation of the various divisions of books associated with the scribe Ezra may be found in the Wikipedia article entitled "Esdras".))	Hebrew (lost) with Latin additions			No	No	No – (inc in Appendix in Clementine Vulgate as 4 Esdras.)	No; 2 Esdras (Apocrypha)	No	No (Apocrypha)	No (Greek ms. lost) (Note: Evidence strongly suggests that a Greek manuscript of 4 Ezra once existed; this furthermore implies a Hebrew origin for the text.)	Yes; 3 Esdras	Yes; 3 Ezra – inc. as noncanonical (Note: In Eastern Orthodox Churches, including the Georgian Orthodox Church, Ecumenical Councils are the highest written determining church authority on the lists of Biblical books. Canon 2 of the Quinisext Council, held in Trullo and affirmed by the Eastern Orthodox Churches, listed and affirmed biblical canon lists, such as the list in Canon 85 of the Canons of the Apostles. Trullo's Biblical Canon lists affirmed documents such as 1-3 Maccabees, but neither Slavonic 3 Esdra/Ezra (AKA Vulgate "4 Ezra/Esdras"), nor 4 Maccabees. Source: Canon 2, Council of Trullo, https://www.newadvent.org/fathers/3814.htm Georgian Orthodox Bibles apparently tend to include Slavonic 3 Esdra/Ezra and 4 Maccabees (both apocryphal). Contemporary Georgian Orthodox Bibles may mark them and the Deuterocanonical Books (e.g. 1-3 Maccabees) as "noncanonical." See e.g. "The Old Testament in Modern Georgian Language" on the following Georgian Orthodox website: https://orthodoxy.ge/tserili/biblia/sarchevi.htm)	No – inc. in some mss (Note: 4 Ezra is not included in Bibles and is considered "extra-canonical".)	No – inc. in some mss.	No – inc. in some mss.	Yes; Ezra Sutu'el	Yes (?)
2 Esdras 1–2; 15–16 (5 and 6 Ezra or Apocalypsis of Esdras)	Hebrew (lost)			No	No	No – (inc. in Appendix in Clementine Vulgate as 4 Esdras.)	No (part of 2 Esdras apocryphon)	No	No (Apocrypha)	No (Greek ms.) (Note: An early fragment of 6 Ezra is known to exist in the Greek language, implying a possible Hebrew origin for 2 Esdras 15–16.)	Yes; 3 Esdras	Yes; 3 Ezra – inc. as noncanonical	No	No	No	No	No
Esther (Note: Esther's placement within the canon was questioned by Luther. Others, like Melito, omitted it from the canon altogether.)	Hebrew	21	20	Yes (part of Ketuvim)	No	Yes	Yes	Yes	Yes	Yes	Yes	Yes	Yes	Yes	Yes	Yes	Yes
Additions to Esther	Greek		varies	No	No	Yes (Deuterocanonical)	No (Apocrypha)	No (Apocrypha)	No (Apocrypha)	Yes	Yes	Yes	Yes	Yes	Yes	Yes	Yes
Tobit	Aramaic and Hebrew		18	No	No	Yes; Tobias (Deuterocanonical)	No (Apocrypha)	No (Apocrypha)	No (Apocrypha)	Yes	Yes	Yes	Yes	Yes	Yes	Yes	Yes
Judith	Hebrew		19	No	No	Yes (Deuterocanonical)	No (Apocrypha)	No (Apocrypha)	No (Apocrypha)	Yes	Yes	Yes	Yes	Yes	Yes	Yes	Yes
1 Maccabees (Note: The Latin Vulgate, Douay–Rheims, and Revised Standard Version Catholic Edition place First and Second Maccabees after Malachi; other Catholic translations place them after Esther.)	Hebrew (lost), Greek (surviving)			No	No	Yes; 1 Machabees (Deuterocanonical)	No (Apocrypha)	No (Apocrypha)	No (Apocrypha	Yes	Yes	Yes	Yes	Yes	Yes	No	Yes
2 Maccabees	Greek			No	No	Yes; 2 Machabees (Deuterocanonical)	No (Apocrypha)	No (Apocrypha)	No (Apocrypha)	Yes	Yes	Yes	Yes	Yes	Yes	No	Yes
3 Maccabees	Greek			No	No	No	No	No	No (Apocrypha)	Yes	Yes	Yes	Yes	No	Yes (?)	No	Yes (?)
4 Maccabees	Greek			No	No	No	No	No	No (Apocrypha)	No (appendix)	No	Yes – inc. as noncanonical	No (early tradition)	No (Coptic ms.)	No – inc. in some mss.	No	Yes (?)
1 Ethiopic Maccabees (1 Meqabyan)	Geʽez			No	No	No	No	No	No	No	No	No	No	No	No	Yes	No
2 and 3 Ethiopic Maccabees (Note: 2 and 3 Meqabyan, though relatively unrelated in content, are often counted as a single book.) (2 and 3 Meqabyan)	Geʽez			No	No	No	No	No	No	No	No	No	No	No	No	Yes	No
1 Enoch (Note: These three books are traditionally attributed to Enoch.)	Aramaic or Hebrew			No	No	No	No	No	No	No	No	No	No	No	No	Yes	No
2 Enoch (Note: This book was heavily utilized by the Bogomils. Some scholars attribute 2 Enoch to an unidentified Jewish sect.)	Greek (lost), possibly Semitic original			No	No	No	No	No	No	No	No	No	No	No	No	No	No
3 Enoch (Note: This book hold significance in Merkabah mysticism.)	Hebrew with Latin and Greek words			No	No	No	No	No	No	No	No	No	No	No	No	No	No
Jubilees	Hebrew			No	No	No	No	No	No	No	No	No	No	No	No	Yes	No
Ethiopic Pseudo-Josephus (Zëna Ayhud)	Hebrew			No	No	No	No	No	No	No	No	No	No	No	No	Yes (broader canon) (Note: Some sources place Zëna Ayhud within the "narrower canon".)	No
Josephus' Jewish War VI (Note: A Syriac version of Josephus's Jewish War VI appears in some Peshitta manuscripts as the "Fifth Book of Maccabees". This isn't to be confused with the book known academically as 5 Maccabees.)	Aramaic or Hebrew (lost)			No	No	No	No	No	No	No	No	No	No	No	No – inc. in some mss.	No	Yes (?)
Testaments of the Twelve Patriarchs	Hebrew or Greek			No	No	No	No	No	No	No (Greek ms.)	No	No	No – inc. in some mss.	No	No	No	No
Joseph and Asenath	Greek?			No	No	No	No	No	No	No	No (Slavonic ms.)	No	No – inc. in some mss.	No	No – (early tradition)	No (early tradition?) (Note: Several varying historical canon lists exist for the Orthodox Tewahedo tradition. In one particular list found in a British Library manuscript (Add MS 16188), a book of Assenath is placed within the canon. This most likely refers to the book more commonly known as Joseph and Asenath. An unknown book of Uzziah is also listed there, which may be connected to the lost Acts of Uzziah referenced in 2 Chronicles 26:22.)	Yes (?)
				Ketuvim		Wisdom literature											
Job	Hebrew	16	26	Yes; Iyov	No	Yes	Yes	Yes	Yes	Yes	Yes	Yes	Yes	Yes	Yes	Yes	Yes
Additions to Job	Hebrew		26	No	No	No	No	No	No	Yes	Yes	No (?)	Yes	No	No	Yes (?)	No
Psalms 1–150 (Note: Some traditions use an alternative set of liturgical or metrical Psalms.)	Hebrew	14	27	Yes; Tehillim	No	Yes	Yes	Yes	Yes	Yes	Yes	Yes	Yes	Yes	Yes	Yes	Yes
Psalm 151	Hebrew		27	No	No	No – inc. in some mss.	No	No	No (Apocrypha)	Yes	Yes	Yes	Yes	Yes	No – inc. in some mss.	Yes	No – inc. in some mss.
Psalms 152–155	Hebrew			No	No	No	No	No	No	No	No	No	No	No	No – inc. in some mss.	No	No – inc. in some mss.
Psalms of Solomon (Note: In many ancient manuscripts, a distinct collection known as the Odes of Solomon is found together with the similar Psalms of Solomon.)	Hebrew or Aramaic (lost)			No	No	No	No	No	No	No – inc. in some mss.	No	No	No	No	No – inc. in some mss.	No	No – inc. in some mss.
Proverbs	Hebrew	15	29	Yes; Mishlei	No	Yes	Yes	Yes	Yes	Yes	Yes	Yes	Yes	Yes	Yes	Yes (in 2 books); Messale (Prov. 1-24) and Tägsas (Prov. 25-31)	Yes
Ecclesiastes	Hebrew	20	30	Yes; Qohelet	No	Yes	Yes	Yes	Yes	Yes	Yes	Yes	Yes	Yes	Yes	Yes	Yes
Song of Songs (Song of Solomon)	Hebrew	17	31	Yes; Shir HaShirim	No	Yes; Canticle of Canticles	Yes	Yes	Yes	Yes; Aisma Aismaton	Yes; Aisma Aismaton	Yes; Aisma Aismaton	Yes	Yes	Yes	Yes	Yes
Wisdom or Wisdom of Solomon	Greek		32	No	No	Yes (Deuterocanonical)	No (Apocrypha)	No (Apocrypha)	No (Apocrypha)	Yes	Yes	Yes	Yes	Yes	Yes	Yes	Yes
Wisdom of Sirach or Sirach (1–51) (Note: The book of Sirach is usually preceded by a non-canonical prologue written by the author's grandson.)	Hebrew		33	No	No	Yes (Note: In the Latin Vulgate and Douay-Rheims, chapter 51 of Ecclesiasticus appears separately as the "Prayer of Joshua, son of Sirach".); Ecclesiasticus (Deuterocanonical)	No (Apocrypha)	No (Apocrypha)	No (Apocrypha)	Yes	Yes	Yes	Yes	Yes	Yes	Yes	Yes
Prayer of Solomon (Sirach 52) (Note: A shorter variant of the prayer by King Solomon in 1 Kings 8:22–52 appeared in some medieval Latin manuscripts and is found in some Latin Bibles at the end of or immediately following Ecclesiasticus.)				No	No	No – inc. in some mss.	No	No	No	No	No	No	No	No	No	No	No
				Nevi'im Akharonim		Prophets											
Isaiah	Hebrew	10	34	Yes; Yeshayahu	No	Yes; Isaias	Yes	Yes	Yes	Yes	Yes	Yes	Yes	Yes	Yes	Yes	Yes
Ascension of Isaiah				No	No	No	No	No	No	No	No	No	No – liturgical (?) (Note: The "Martyrdom of Isaiah" is prescribed reading to honor the prophet Isaiah within the Armenian Apostolic liturgy. While this likely refers to the account of Isaiah's death within the Lives of the Prophets, it may be a reference to the account of his death found within the first five chapters of the Ascension of Isaiah, which is widely known by this name. The two narratives have similarities and may share a common source.)	No	No	No – Ethiopic mss. (early tradition?) (Note: The Ascension of Isaiah has long been known to be a part of the Orthodox Tewahedo scriptural tradition. Though it is not currently considered canonical, various sources attest to the early canonicity—or at least "semi-canonicity"—of this book.)	No
Jeremiah	Hebrew	10	34	Yes; Yirmeyahu	No	Yes; Jeremias	Yes	Yes	Yes	Yes	Yes	Yes	Yes	Yes	Yes	Yes	Yes
Lamentations (1–5)	Hebrew	19	36	Yes; Eikha (part of Ketuvim)	No	Yes (Note: In some Latin versions, chapter 5 of Lamentations appears separately as the "Prayer of Jeremiah".)	Yes	Yes	Yes	Yes	Yes	Yes	Yes	Yes	Yes	Yes (part of Säqoqawä Eremyas) (Note: Ethiopic Lamentations consists of eleven chapters, parts of which are considered to be non-canonical.)	Yes
Baruch	Hebrew		37	No	No	Yes (Deuterocanonical)	No (Apocrypha)	No (Apocrypha)	No (Apocrypha)	Yes	Yes	Yes	Yes	Yes	Yes; 2 Baruch	Yes (Note: The canonical Ethiopic version of Baruch has five chapters, but is shorter than the LXX text.) (Note: Some Ethiopic translations of Baruch may include the traditional Letter of Jeremiah as the sixth chapter.)	Yes
Letter of Jeremiah	Greek (majority view) or Hebrew (minority view)		38	No	No	Yes (chapter 6 of Baruch) (Deuterocanonical)	No (Apocrypha)	No (Apocrypha)	No (Apocrypha)	Yes	Yes	Yes	Yes	Yes	Yes	Yes (part of Säqoqawä Eremyas) (Note: The "Letter to the Captives" found within Säqoqawä Eremyas—and also known as the sixth chapter of Ethiopic Lamentations—may contain different content from the Letter of Jeremiah (to those same captives) found in other traditions.)	Yes
Syriac Apocalypse of Baruch (2 Baruch 1–77) (Note: The Letter of Baruch is found in chapters 78–87 of 2 Baruch—the final ten chapters of the book. The letter had a wider circulation and often appeared separately from the first 77 chapters of the book, which is an apocalypse.)	Hebrew (lost)			No	No	No	No	No	No	No	No	No	No	No	No – inc. in some mss.	No	Yes (?)
Letter of Baruch (2 Baruch 78–86)	Hebrew (lost)			No	No	No	No	No	No	No	No	No	No	No	Yes; 1 Baruch	No	Yes (?)
Greek Apocalypse of Baruch (3 Baruch) (Note: Included here for the purpose of disambiguation, 3 Baruch is widely rejected as a pseudepigraphon and is not part of any Biblical tradition. Two manuscripts exist—a longer Greek manuscript with Christian interpolations and a shorter Slavonic version. There is some uncertainty about which was written first.)	Greek (disputed)			No	No	No	No	No	No	No (Greek ms.)	No (Slavonic ms.)	No	No	No	No	No	No
4 Baruch				No	No	No	No	No	No	No	No	No	No	No	No	Yes (part of Säqoqawä Eremyas)	No
Ezekiel	Hebrew	12	39	Yes; Yekhezqel	No	Yes; Ezechiel	Yes	Yes	Yes	Yes	Yes	Yes	Yes	Yes	Yes	Yes	Yes
Daniel	Aramaic and Hebrew	22	40	Yes (part of Ketuvim)	No	Yes	Yes	Yes	Yes	Yes	Yes	Yes	Yes	Yes	Yes	Yes	Yes
Additions to Daniel (Note: Bel and the Dragon, Susanna, and The Prayer of Azariah and Song of the Three Holy Children.)	Greek		40	No	No	Yes (Deuterocanonical)	No (Apocrypha)	No (Apocrypha)	No (Apocrypha)	Yes	Yes	Yes	Yes	Yes	Yes	Yes	Yes
Syriac Apocalypse of Daniel (Dani'il z'ura)				No	No	No	No	No	No	No	No	No	No	No	No – inc. in some mss.	No	Yes (?)
Hosea	Hebrew	13	41	Yes (Trei Asar)	No	Yes; Osee	Yes	Yes	Yes	Yes	Yes	Yes	Yes	Yes	Yes	Yes	Yes
Joel	Hebrew	13	42	Yes (Trei Asar)	No	Yes	Yes	Yes	Yes	Yes	Yes	Yes	Yes	Yes	Yes	Yes	Yes
Amos	Hebrew	13	43	Yes (Trei Asar)	No	Yes	Yes	Yes	Yes	Yes	Yes	Yes	Yes	Yes	Yes	Yes	Yes
Obadiah	Hebrew	13	44	Yes (Trei Asar)	No	Yes; Abdias	Yes	Yes	Yes	Yes	Yes	Yes	Yes	Yes	Yes	Yes	Yes
Jonah	Hebrew	13	45	Yes (Trei Asar)	No	Yes; Jonas	Yes	Yes	Yes	Yes	Yes	Yes	Yes	Yes	Yes	Yes	Yes
Micah	Hebrew	13	46	Yes (Trei Asar)	No	Yes; Micheas	Yes	Yes	Yes	Yes	Yes	Yes	Yes	Yes	Yes	Yes	Yes
Nahum	Hebrew	13	47	Yes (Trei Asar)	No	Yes	Yes	Yes	Yes	Yes	Yes	Yes	Yes	Yes	Yes	Yes	Yes
Habakkuk	Hebrew	13	48	Yes (Trei Asar)	No	Yes; Habacuc	Yes	Yes	Yes	Yes	Yes	Yes	Yes	Yes	Yes	Yes	Yes
Zephaniah	Hebrew	13	49	Yes (Trei Asar)	No	Yes; Sophonias	Yes	Yes	Yes	Yes	Yes	Yes	Yes	Yes	Yes	Yes	Yes
Haggai	Hebrew	13	50	Yes (Trei Asar)	No	Yes; Aggeus	Yes	Yes	Yes	Yes	Yes	Yes	Yes	Yes	Yes	Yes	Yes
Zechariah	Hebrew	13	51	Yes (Trei Asar)	No	Yes; Zacharias	Yes	Yes	Yes	Yes	Yes	Yes	Yes	Yes	Yes	Yes	Yes
Malachi	Hebrew	13	52	Yes (Trei Asar)	No	Yes; Malachias	Yes	Yes	Yes	Yes	Yes	Yes	Yes	Yes	Yes	Yes	Yes

=== New Testament ===
Other New Testament works that are generally considered apocryphal nonetheless appear in some Bibles and manuscripts. For instance, the Epistle to the Laodiceans was included in numerous Latin Vulgate manuscripts, in the eighteen German Bibles prior to Luther's translation, and also a number of early English Bibles, such as Gundulf's Bible and John Wycliffe's English translation—even as recently as 1728, William Whiston considered this epistle to be genuinely Pauline. Likewise, the Third Epistle to the Corinthians (found as a section within the Acts of Paul) was once considered to be part of the Armenian Orthodox Bible, but is no longer printed in modern editions. Within the Syriac Orthodox tradition, the Third Epistle to the Corinthians also has a history of significance. Both Aphrahat and Ephraem of Syria held it in high regard and treated it as if it were canonical.

The Didache, The Shepherd of Hermas, and other writings attributed to the Apostolic Fathers, were once considered scriptural by various early Church Fathers. They are still being honored in some traditions, though they are no longer considered to be canonical. However, certain canonical books within the Orthodox Tewahedo traditions find their origin in the writings of the Apostolic Fathers as well as the Ancient Church Orders. The Orthodox Tewahedo churches recognize these eight additional New Testament books in its broader canon. They are as follows: the four books of Sinodos, the two books of the Covenant, Ethiopic Clement, and the Ethiopic Didascalia.

==== New Testament table ====
This table lists fifty-two books.

Books	Protestant tradition (Note: Edmon L. Gallagher and John D. Meade. The biblical canon lists from early Christianity: Texts and analysis. (Oxford: OUP, 2017), pp.xx-xxii.)	Roman Catholic tradition	Eastern Orthodox tradition (Note: Edmon L. Gallagher and John D. Meade. The biblical canon lists from early Christianity: Texts and analysis. (Oxford: OUP, 2017), pp.xx-xxii.)	Syriac Christian traditions (Note: The Peshitta excludes 2 John, 3 John, 2 Peter, Jude, and Revelation, but certain Bibles of the modern Syriac traditions include later translations of those books. Still today, the official lectionary followed by the Syriac Orthodox Church and the Assyrian Church of the East, present lessons from only the twenty-two books of Peshitta, the version to which appeal is made for the settlement of doctrinal questions. According to the official Catechism of the Assyrian Church of the East, the books of 2 John, 3 John, 2 Peter, Jude, and Revelation are not accepted as part of the New Testament canon. See: Catechism [of] The Holy Apostolic Catholic Assyrian Church of the East, pgs. 23-24)	Armenian Apostolic tradition (Note: The growth and development of the Armenian Biblical canon is complex. Extra-canonical New Testament books appear in historical canon lists and recensions that are either distinct to this tradition, or where they do exist elsewhere, never achieved the same status. Some of the books are not listed in this table. These include the Prayer of Euthalius, the Repose of St. John the Evangelist, the Doctrine of Addai (some sources replace this with the Acts of Thaddeus), a reading from the Gospel of James (some sources replace this with the Apocryphon of James), the Second Apostolic Canons, the Words of Justus, Dionysius Aeropagite, the Acts of Peter (some sources replace this with the Preaching of Peter), and a Poem by Ghazar. (Various sources also mention undefined Armenian canonical additions to the Gospels of Mark and John, however, these may refer to the general additions—Mark 16:9–20 and John 7:53–8:11—discussed elsewhere in these notes.) A possible exception here to canonical exclusivity is the Second Apostolic Canons, which share a common source—the Apostolic Constitutions—with certain parts of the Orthodox Tewahedo New Testament broader canon. The correspondence between King Agbar and Jesus Christ, which is found in various forms—including within both the Doctrine of Addai and the Acts of Thaddeus—sometimes appears separately. It is noteworthy that the Prayer of Euthalius and the Repose of St. John the Evangelist appear in the appendix of the 1805 Armenian Zohrab Bible. However, some of the aforementioned books, though they are found within canon lists, have nonetheless never been discovered to be part of any Armenian Biblical manuscript. See: Michael E. Stone, "Armenian Canon Lists I—the Council of Partaw (768 CE)." Harvard Theological Review 66.4 (1973): 479-486; Michael E. Stone, "Armenian Canon Lists II—The Stichometry of Anania of Shirak (c. 615-c. 690 CE.)." Harvard Theological Review 68.3-4 (1975): 253-260. Michael E. Stone, "Armenian Canon Lists III—The Lists of Mechitar of Ayrivankʿ (c. 1285 CE)." Harvard Theological Review 69.3-4 (1976): 289-300 Michael E. Stone, "Armenian Canon Lists IV—The List of Gregory of Tatʿew (14th Century)." Harvard Theological Review 72.3-4 (1979): 237-244; Michael E. Stone, "Armenian Canon Lists V—Anonymous Texts." Harvard Theological Review 83.2 (1990): 141-161; Michael E. Stone, "Armenian Canon Lists VI—Hebrew Names and Other Attestations." Harvard Theological Review 94.4 (2001): 477-491. Michael E. Stone, "Armenian Canon Lists VII: The Poetic List of Aṙak 'el of Siwnik '(d. 1409)." Harvard Theological Review 104.3 (2011): 367-379.)	Coptic Orthodox tradition	Orthodox Tewahedo traditions
Canonical gospels (Note: Though widely regarded as non-canonical, the Gospel of James obtained early liturgical acceptance among some Eastern churches and remains a major source for many of Christendom's traditions related to Mary, the mother of Jesus.)
Matthew	Yes	Yes	Yes	Yes (Note: The Diatessaron, Tatian's gospel harmony, became a standard text in some Syriac-speaking churches down to the 5th century, when it gave-way to the four separate gospels found in the Peshitta.)	Yes	Yes	Yes
Mark (Note: Parts of these four books are not found in the most reliable ancient sources; in some cases, are thought to be later additions; and have therefore not historically existed in every Biblical tradition. They are as follows: Mark 16:9–20, John 7:53–8:11, the Comma Johanneum, and portions of the Western version of Acts. To varying degrees, arguments for the authenticity of these passages—especially for the one from the Gospel of John—have occasionally been made.)	Yes	Yes	Yes	Yes	Yes	Yes	Yes
Luke	Yes	Yes	Yes	Yes	Yes	Yes	Yes
John (Note: Skeireins, a commentary on the Gospel of John in the Gothic language, was included in the Wulfila Bible. It exists today only in fragments.)	Yes	Yes	Yes	Yes	Yes	Yes	Yes
Acts of Apostles
Acts	Yes	Yes	Yes	Yes	Yes	Yes	Yes
Acts of Paul and Thecla (Note: The Acts of Paul and Thecla and the Third Epistle to the Corinthians are portions of the greater Acts of Paul narrative, which is part of a stichometric catalogue of New Testament canon found in the Codex Claromontanus, but has survived only in fragments. Some of the content within these individual sections may have developed separately, however.)	No	No	No	No (early tradition)	No (early tradition)	No	No
Acts of Peter	No (Codex Vercellensis)						
Pauline epistles
Romans	Yes	Yes	Yes	Yes	Yes	Yes	Yes
1 Corinthians	Yes	Yes	Yes	Yes	Yes	Yes	Yes
2 Corinthians	Yes	Yes	Yes	Yes	Yes	Yes	Yes
3 Corinthians (Note: The Third Epistle to the Corinthians always appears as a correspondence; it also includes a short letter from the Corinthians to Paul.)	No	No	No	No (early tradition)	No − inc. in some manuscripts	No	No
Galatians	Yes	Yes	Yes	Yes	Yes	Yes	Yes
Ephesians	Yes	Yes	Yes	Yes	Yes	Yes	Yes
Philippians	Yes	Yes	Yes	Yes	Yes	Yes	Yes
Colossians	Yes	Yes	Yes	Yes	Yes	Yes	Yes
Laodiceans	No − inc. in Wycliffe and Quaker Bibles. (Note: The Epistle to the Laodiceans is present in some western non-Roman Catholic translations and traditions. Especially of note is John Wycliffe's inclusion of the epistle in his English translation, and the Quakers' use of it to the point where they produced a translation and made pleas for its canonicity (Poole's Annotations, on Col. 4:16). The epistle is nonetheless widely rejected by the vast majority of Protestants.)	No − inc. in some manuscripts	No	No	No	No	No
1 Thessalonians	Yes	Yes	Yes	Yes	Yes	Yes	Yes
2 Thessalonians	Yes	Yes	Yes	Yes	Yes	Yes	Yes
1 Timothy	Yes	Yes	Yes	Yes	Yes	Yes	Yes
2 Timothy	Yes	Yes	Yes	Yes	Yes	Yes	Yes
Titus	Yes	Yes	Yes	Yes	Yes	Yes	Yes
Philemon	Yes	Yes	Yes	Yes	Yes	Yes	Yes
Catholic epistles (General epistles)
Hebrews	Yes (Note: These four works were questioned or "spoken against" by Martin Luther, and he changed the order of his New Testament to reflect this, but he did not leave them out, nor has any Lutheran body since. Traditional German Luther Bibles are still printed with the New Testament in this changed "Lutheran" order. The vast majority of Protestants embrace these four works as fully canonical.)	Yes	Yes	Yes	Yes	Yes	Yes
James	Yes	Yes	Yes	Yes	Yes	Yes	Yes
1 Peter	Yes	Yes	Yes	Yes	Yes	Yes	Yes
2 Peter	Yes	Yes	Yes	Yes	Yes	Yes	Yes
1 John	Yes	Yes	Yes	Yes	Yes	Yes	Yes
2 John	Yes	Yes	Yes	Yes	Yes	Yes	Yes
3 John	Yes	Yes	Yes	Yes	Yes	Yes	Yes
Jude	Yes	Yes	Yes	Yes	Yes	Yes	Yes
Apocalypse
Revelation	Yes	Yes	Yes	Yes	Yes	Yes	Yes
Apocalypse of Peter (Note: The Apocalypse of Peter is part of a stichometric catalogue of New Testament canon found in the Codex Claromontanus. It was also held in high regard by Clement of Alexandria.)	No (Listed as canon in the Muratorian Canon) (Muratorian fragment)						
Apostolic Fathers, (Note: Other known writings of the Apostolic Fathers not listed in this table are as follows: the fragment of Quadratus of Athens, the fragments of Papias of Hierapolis, the Reliques of the Elders Preserved in Irenaeus, and the Apostles' Creed.) Church Orders, (Note: Though they are not listed in this table, the Apostolic Constitutions were considered canonical by some including Alexius Aristenus, John of Salisbury, and to a lesser extent, Grigor Tat'evatsi. They are even classified as part of the New Testament canon within the body of the Constitutions itself. Moreover, they are the source for a great deal of the content in the Orthodox Tewahedo broader canon.) and other Apocrypha
1 Clement (Note: These five writings attributed to the Apostolic Fathers are not currently considered canonical in any Biblical tradition, though they are more highly regarded by some more than others. Nonetheless, their early authorship and inclusion in ancient Biblical codices, as well as their acceptance to varying degrees by various early authorities, requires them to be treated as foundational literature for Christianity as a whole.)	No (Listed as canonical in "Canon 85" of the Canons of the Apostles) (Codices Alexandrinus and Hierosolymitanus)						
2 Clement	No (Listed as canonical in "Canon 85" of the Canons of the Apostles) (Codices Alexandrinus and Hierosolymitanus)						
Shepherd of Hermas	No (some early traditions) (Codex Claromontanus and Codex Siniaticus)						
Epistle of Barnabas	No (some early traditions) (Codex Claromontanus, Codex Hierosolymitanus and Codex Siniaticus)						
Didache	No (Codex Hierosolymitanus)						
Letters of Ignatius of Antioch	No (Codex Hierosolymitanus)						
Epistle of Polycarp	No						
Martyrdom of Polycarp	No (Ecclesiastical History (Eusebius))						
Martyrium Ignatii	No (Codex Colbertinus)						
Epistle to Diognetus (Note: Some editors place the Epistle to Diognetus among the apologetic writings, rather than among the Apostolic Fathers (Stevenson, J. A New Eusebius SPCK (1965) p. 400).)	No						
Protoevangelium of James	No (Bodmer Papyri)						
Ser'atä Seyon (Sinodos)	No	No	No	No	No	No	Yes (broader canon)
Te'ezaz (Sinodos)	No	No	No	No	No	No	Yes (broader canon)
Gessew (Sinodos)	No	No	No	No	No	No	Yes (broader canon)
Abtelis (Sinodos)	No	No	No	No	No	No	Yes (broader canon)
Book of the Covenant 1 (Mäshafä Kidan)	No	No	No	No	No	No	Yes (broader canon)
Book of the Covenant 2 (Mäshafä Kidan)	No	No	No	No	No	No	Yes (broader canon)
Ethiopic Clement (Qälëmentos) (Note: Ethiopic Clement and the Ethiopic Didascalia are distinct from and should not be confused with other ecclesiastical documents known in the west by similar names.)	No	No	No	No	No	No	Yes (broader canon)
Ethiopic Didescalia (Didesqelya)	No	No	No	No	No	No	Yes (broader canon)
Kebra Nagast	No	No	No	No	No	No	No (elevated status)

== See also ==
- Canon (fiction)
- List of religious texts
- Related to the Bible
  - Biblical criticism
  - Canonical criticism
  - Jewish apocrypha
  - List of Old Testament pseudepigrapha
  - Non-canonical gospels include:
    - Gospel of Barnabas
    - Gospel of Bartholomew
    - Gospel of Basilides
    - Gospel of Thomas
    - List of Gospels
  - New Testament apocrypha
  - Pseudepigrapha
  - Non-canonical books referenced in the Bible
- Canons of other religions
  - List of Islamic texts
  - Canonization of Islamic scripture
  - Avesta or Zoroastrian scriptures
  - Yazidi holy texts
  - Hindu scriptures
  - Sikh scriptures or Adi Granth aka Guru Granth Sahib
  - Tripiṭaka or Buddhist canon
    - Pāli Canon
    - Mahayana Canons
  - Chinese classics
  - Thirteen Classics or Confucian canon
    - Ruzang
  - Daozang or Taoist canon
