= Second Epistle of Clement =

Early Christian text

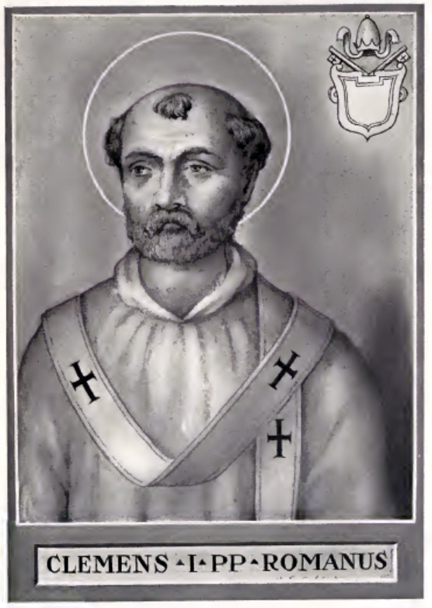
The homily known as 2 Clement was traditionally attributed to Pope Clement I of Rome.

The Second Epistle of Clement (Ancient Greek: Κλήμεντος πρὸς Κορινθίους, romanized: Klēmentos pros Korinthious, lit. 'from Clement to Corinthians'), often referred to as 2 Clement (pronounced "Second Clement"), is an early Christian writing. It was at one point possibly considered canonical by the Roman Catholic Church, Coptic Orthodox Church and Eastern Orthodox Church. 1 and 2 Clement were included in some Bibles, such as the Codex Alexandrinus and Codex Hierosolymitanus, but are not included by active churches in the modern New Testament and are classified by them as New Testament apocrypha. It is part of the Apostolic Fathers collection.

== Authorship ==
2 Clement was traditionally believed to have been an epistle to the Christian Church in Corinth written by Clement of Rome sometime in the late 1st century. However, 4th-century bishop Eusebius, in his historical work, says that there was only one recognized epistle of Clement (namely the so-called First Epistle of Clement). He expresses doubt about the authenticity of a second epistle. Similar doubts were also expressed by Jerome in the 5th century. Modern scholars believe that Second Clement is actually a sermon written around AD 120–140 by an anonymous author, one who was not Clement of Rome. Nonetheless, scholars still generally refer to the work by its traditional name "Second Clement", although it is sometimes also referred to as "An Ancient Christian Homily".

2 Clement appears to be a transcript of a homily or sermon that was originally delivered orally at a Christian worship service. For example, in chapter 19, the speaker announces that they will read aloud from scripture – something one would only expect to find in a transcript of an oral sermon. Similarly, whereas an epistle would typically begin by introducing the sender and recipient, 2 Clement starts with by addressing "Brethren", and then proceeding directly to the sermon. If it is a sermon, 2 Clement would be the earliest surviving Christian sermon (aside from those found in the New Testament).

Like many early Christian texts, 2 Clement was written in Greek, the common language of the Hellenized Mediterranean area.

The earliest external reference to 2 Clement is found in Eusebius's Ecclesiastical History written in the early 4th century:

But it must be observed also that there is said to be a second epistle of Clement. But we do not know that this is recognized like the former, for we do not find that the ancients have made any use of it. And certain men have lately brought forward other wordy and lengthy writings under his name, containing dialogues of Peter and Apion. But no mention has been made of these by the ancients; for they do not even preserve the pure stamp of apostolic orthodoxy.

Christopher Tuckett has argued that the author of 2 Clement presupposes the existence of the Gospel of Luke.

== Content ==
Rather than trying to convert others to Christianity, 2 Clement appears to be directed at an audience of Christians who had converted from Paganism. 2 Clement seems to refer to a history of idolatry: "[Previously] we were maimed in our understanding – we were worshipping stones and pieces of wood, and gold and silver and copper – all of them made by humans".

Despite their pagan background, the speaker and audience in 2 Clement appear to consider the Jewish texts to be scripture – the speaker quotes repeatedly from the Book of Isaiah and interprets the text. The speaker also regards the words of Jesus as scripture – for example, 2 Clement 2:4 mentions a saying of Jesus (identical to Mark 2:17) as "scripture":

Και ετερα δε γραφη λεγει, οτι "ουκ ηλθον καλεσαι δικαιους, αλλα αμαρτωλους".

Translation:

Again another scripture saith, I came not to call the righteous, but sinners.

In addition to the canonical literature, the author of 2 Clement appears to have had access to Christian writings or oral tradition aside from those found in the New Testament. Some quotes attributed to Jesus are found only here, e.g. 4:5:

δια τουτο ταυτα υμων πρασσοντων, ειπεν ο κυριος· "Εαν ητε μετ' εμου συνηγμενοι εν τω κολπω μου και μη ποιητε τας εντολας μου, αποβαλω υμας και ερω υμιν· Υπαγετε απ΄εμου, ουκ οιδα υμας, ποθεν εστε, εργαται ανομιας".

Translation:

For this cause, if ye do these things, the Lord said, "Though ye be gathered together with Me in My bosom, and do not My commandments, I will cast you away and will say unto you, Depart from Me, I know you not whence ye are, ye workers of iniquity".

In 2 Clement 5:2–4, the author quotes a saying of Jesus which is partially found in the New Testament, but the version quoted in 2 Clement is substantially longer than the version found in the New Testament.

Λεγει γαρ ο κυριος· "Εσεσθε ως αρνια εν μεσω λυκων". αποκριθεις δε ο Πετρος αυτω λεγει· "Εαν ουν διασπαραξωσιν οι λυκοι τα αρωια;" ειπεν ο Ιησους τω Πετρω· "Μη φοβεισθωσαν τα αρνια τους λυκους μετα το αποθανειν αυτα· και υμεις μη φοβεισθε τους αποκτενοντας υμας και μηδεν υμιν δυναμενους ποιειν, αλλα φοβεισθε τον μετα το αποθανειν υμας εχοντα εξουσιαν ψυχης και σωματος του βαλειν εις γεενναν πυρος".

Translation:

For the Lord saith, Ye shall be as lambs in the midst of wolves. But Peter answered and said unto Him, What then, if the wolves should tear the lambs? Jesus said unto Peter, Let not the lambs fear the wolves after they are dead; and ye also, fear ye not them that kill you and are not able to do anything to you; but fear Him that after ye are dead hath power over soul and body, to cast them into the Gehenna of fire.

In the 20th century, a manuscript fragment was discovered that suggests this saying is a quote from the Gospel of Peter, much of which has been lost. Similarly, 2 Clement 12:2 says:

επερωτηθεις γαρ αυτος ο κυριος υπο τινος, ποτε ηξει αυτου η βασιλεια, ειπεν Οταν εσται τα δυο εν, και το εξω ως το εσω, και το αρσεν μετα της θηλειας ουτε αρσεν ουτε θηλυ.

Translation:

For the Lord Himself, being asked by a certain person when his kingdom would come, said, When the two shall be one, and the outside as the inside, and the male with the female, neither male or female.

He then goes on to give interpretations of these metaphors. The saying was ascribed to Cassianus and to the Greek Gospel of the Egyptians by Clement of Alexandria.

A version of the saying is found in the Coptic Gospel of Thomas, which was lost until the mid-20th century:

Jesus saw children that were being suckled. He said to his disciples: These children being suckled are like those who enter the kingdom. They said to him, If we are children, shall we enter the kingdom? Jesus said to them: When you make the two one, and make the inside like the outside, and the outside like the inside, and the upper side like the under side, and when you make the male and the female into a single one, so that the male will not be male and the female will [not] be female; when you make eyes in place of an eye, and a hand in place of a hand, and a foot in place of a foot, an image in place of an image, then you shall enter.

— Gospel of Thomas, verse 22

== See also ==
- Pseudo-Clementine literature

== Sources ==
- Donfried, Karl (October 1973), "The Theology of Second Clement", The Harvard Theological Review, 66 (4), Cambridge University Press: 487–501, doi:10.1017/S0017816000018149, ISSN 0017-8160, JSTOR 1509081, S2CID 170816578
- Eusebius Pamphilius (325), Ecclesiastical history (PDF)
- Holmes, Michael (1 November 2007), Apostolic Fathers, The: Greek Texts and English Translations, Grand Rapids: Baker Academic, ISBN 978-0-8010-3468-8
- Petersen, William (November 2006), "Patristic Biblical Quotations and Method: Four Changes to Lightfoot's Edition of "Second Clement"", Vigiliae Christianae, 60 (4), Brill: 389–419, doi:10.1163/157007206778926292, ISSN 0042-6032, JSTOR 20474780
