= Charisticary =

A charisticary is a person to whom is given the enjoyment of the revenues of a monastery, hospital, or benefice, also known as a commendatory or donatory.

The charisticaries among the ancient Greeks were a kind of donatories who enjoyed all the revenues of hospitals and monasteries, without giving an account thereof to any person. Iconoclasts who have abused this in the past include Constantine Copronymus, the avowed enemy of the monks, whose monasteries he gave away to strangers.

In later times, the emperors and patriarchs gave many to upper-class people, not by way of gift, to reap any temporal advantage from; but to repair, beautify, and patronize them. Eventually, those in good condition were given, especially such as were rich; and at last they were all given away, rich and poor, those of men and of women; and that to laymen and married men.

Jean-Baptiste Cotelier, in his Ecclesiae Graecae Monumenta, gives the form of these donations: they were given for life, or sometimes for two lives.
