= Protocanonical books =

Old Testament books also in the Hebrew Bible

The protocanonical books are those books of the Old Testament that are also included in the Hebrew Bible (the Tanakh) and that came to be considered canonical during the formational period of orthodox Christianity. The Old Testament is entirely rejected by some forms of Gnosticism, but the Hebrew Bible was adhered to even more tightly by Jewish Christians than Gentile Christians. The term protocanonical is often used to contrast these books to the deuterocanonical books or apocrypha, which "were sometimes doubted" by some in the early church, and are considered non-canonical by most Protestants.

There are typically 39 protocanonical books in most Christian bibles, which correspond to the 24 books in the Jewish Tanakh.

== List ==
The list of protocanonical books is Genesis, Exodus, Leviticus, Numbers, Deuteronomy, Joshua, Judges, Ruth, 1–2 Samuel, 1–2 Kings, 1–2 Chronicles, Ezra, Nehemiah, Esther, Job, Psalms, Proverbs, Ecclesiastes, Song of Solomon, Isaiah, Jeremiah, Lamentations, Ezekiel, Daniel, Hosea, Joel, Amos, Obadiah, Jonah, Micah, Nahum, Habakkuk, Zephaniah, Haggai, Zechariah, and Malachi.

== Enumeration ==
These books are typically 39 in number in most English-language bibles. Based on the Jewish tradition of the Tanakh, these same books may be counted as 24 books, counting the twelve minor prophets together as one book, one book each for 1 and 2 Samuel, 1 and 2 Kings, and 1 and 2 Chronicles, as well as a single book for Ezra and Nehemiah. In his prologues, Jerome counted the same content as 22 books, combining Jeremiah with Lamentations and Judges with Ruth. The list given in Codex Hierosolymitanus numbers the same books at 27.

These enumerations were sometimes given a numerological significance. The 22-book enumeration was said to represent the number of letters in the Hebrew alphabet; the 5 double books (Judges/Ruth, 1/2 Samuel, 1/2 Kings, 1/2 Chronicles, Ezra/Nehemiah, and Jeremiah/Lamentations) representing the five Hebrew letters that have double forms, chaph, mem, nun, phe, and sade. The 24-book enumeration was said to be represented by the 24 elders who cast down their crowns before the Lamb in the Book of Revelation. The 27-book enumeration balances one-for-one the 27 canonical books of the New Testament.

== Early variants ==
Most of the protocanonical books were broadly accepted among early Christians. However, some were omitted by a few of the earliest canons, The Marcionites, an early Christian sect that was dominant in some parts of the Roman Empire, recognised a reduced canon excluding the entire Hebrew Bible in favor of a modified version of Luke and ten of the Pauline epistles.

Apart from the extreme example of the Marcionites, isolated disagreements over certain books' canonicity continued for centuries. Athanasius, a fourth-century bishop of Alexandria, omitted Esther from his list, potentially having been influenced by an early 22-book Jewish canon, possibly the one mentioned but not specified by Josephus. Theodore of Mopsuestia omitted Song of Songs, Ecclesiastes, Job, and Ezra–Nehemiah to obtain a listing of 22 books.

== New Testament ==
By analogy with the early and broad acceptance of many of the Hebrew and Greek scriptural texts, the term protocanonical is also sometimes used to describe those works of the 27 book New Testament which were the most widely accepted by the early Church (the Homologoumena, a Greek term meaning "confessed and undisputed"), as distinguished from the remaining books (the Antilegomena, "spoken against"). Some of the Antilegomena, such as the Book of Revelation, later joined the protocanonical books in the canon. It may also be used to refer to all 27 books in their entirety, since they all have been recognized for 1500 years by almost all Christians, especially when making a distinction between them and uncanonical writings of the early Church.

== Sources ==
- Ehrman, Bart D. (2005). Lost Christianities: The Battles for Scripture and the Faiths We Never Knew. Oxford University Press. ISBN 9780195182491.
