= Apostolic Fathers =

Early Christian theologians not included in the New Testament

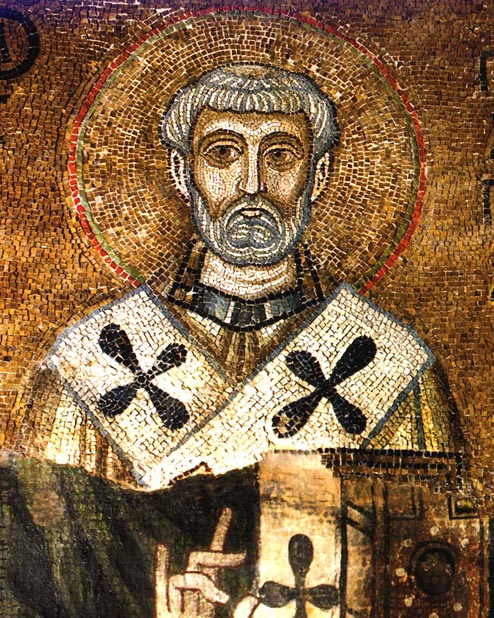
Clement of Rome

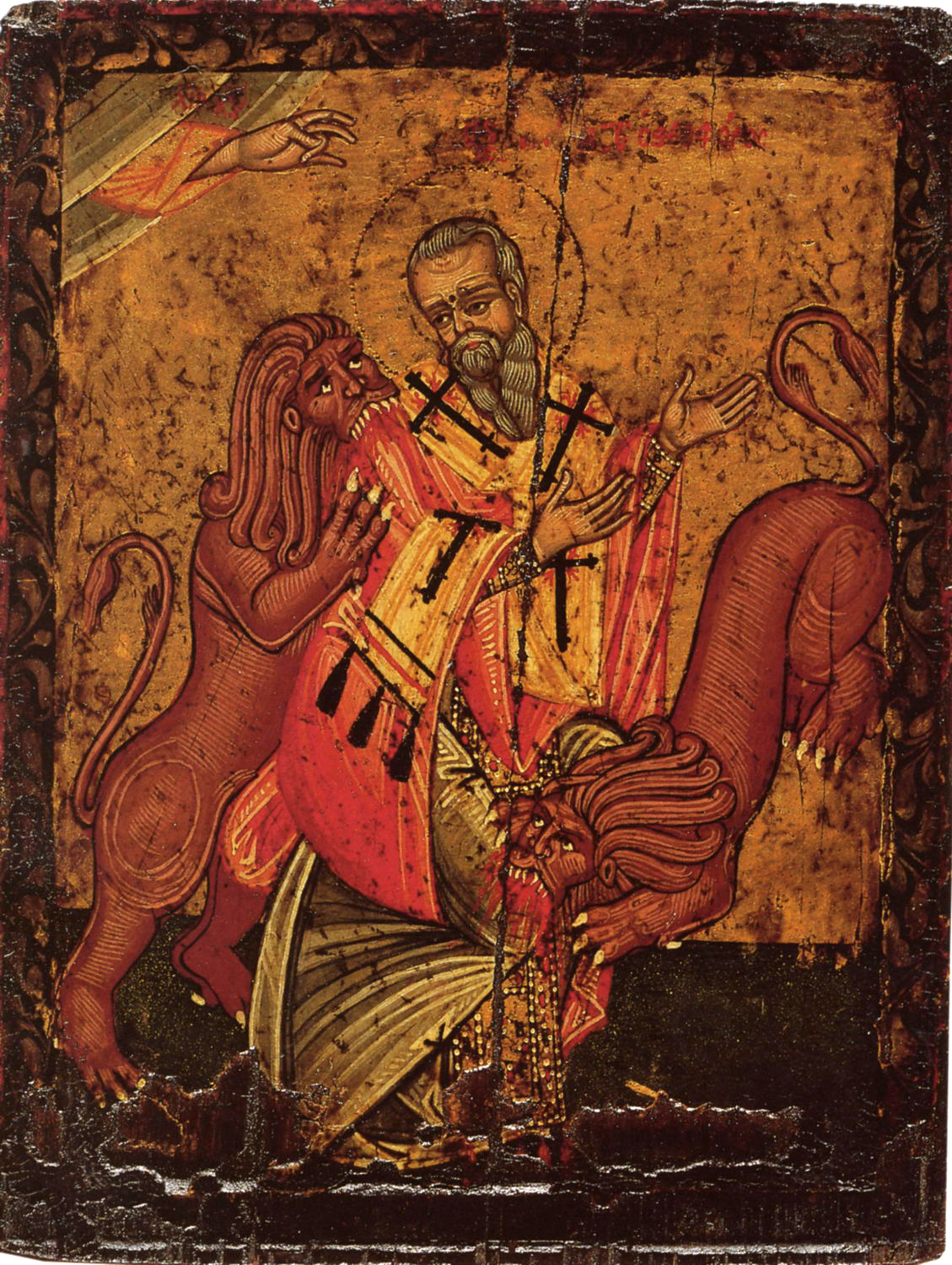
Ignatius of Antioch

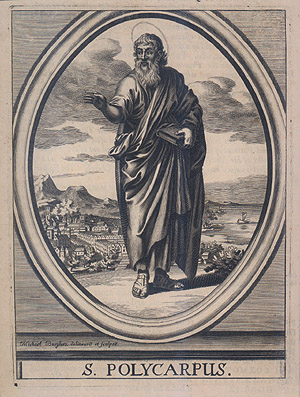
Polycarp of Smyrna

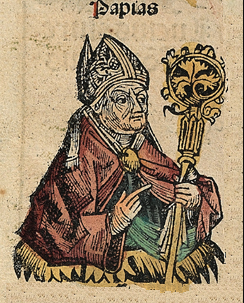
Papias of Hierapolis

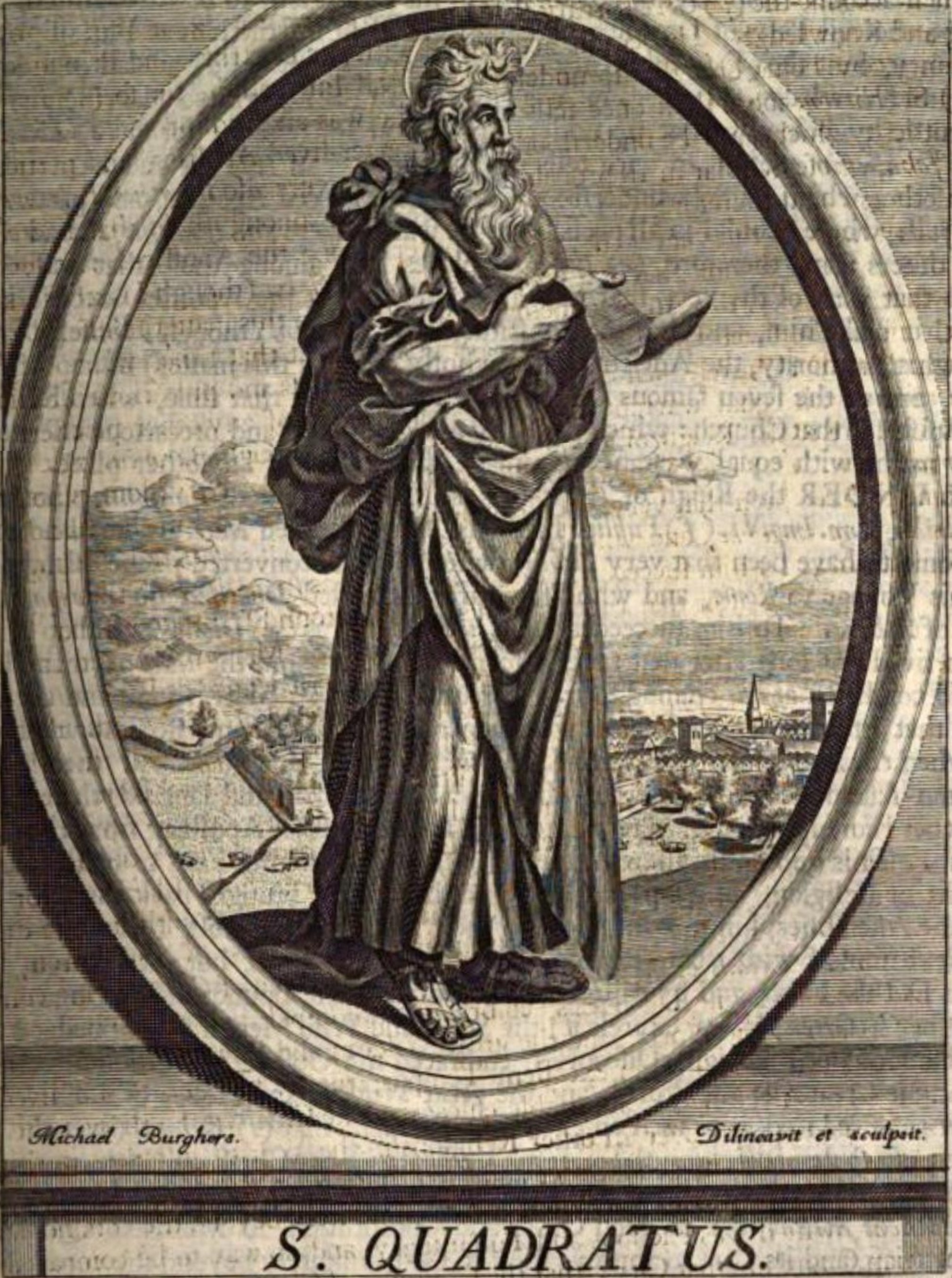
Quadratus of Athens

The Apostolic Fathers were core Christian theologians among the Church Fathers who lived in the 1st and 2nd centuries AD and are believed to have personally known some of the Twelve Apostles or to have been significantly influenced by them. Their writings, though widely circulated in early Christianity, were not included in the canon of the New Testament. Many of the writings derive from the same time period and geographical location as other works of early Christian literature which came to be part of the New Testament.

== Background ==
The label Apostolic Fathers has been applied to these writers only since the 17th century, to indicate that they were thought of as representing the generation that had personal contact with the Twelve Apostles. The earliest known use of the term "Apostolic(al) Fathers" was by William Wake in 1693, when he was chaplain in ordinary to King William and Queen Mary of England. According to the Catholic Encyclopedia, the use of the term Apostolic Fathers can be traced to the title of a 1672 work by Jean-Baptiste Cotelier, SS. Patrum qui temporibus apostolicis floruerunt opera ("Works of the holy fathers who flourished in the apostolic times"), which was abbreviated to Bibliotheca Patrum Apostolicorum (Library of the Apostolic Fathers) by L. J. Ittig in his 1699 edition of the same. The term "apostolic father" first occurs in the Hogedos of Anastasius of the seventh-century, however states that it was never used to refer to a body of writings until later.

The history of the title for these writers was explained by Joseph Lightfoot, in his 1890 translation of the Apostolic Fathers' works:

...[T]he expression ['Apostolic Fathers'] itself does not occur, so far as I have observed, until comparatively recent times. Its origin, or at least its general currency, should probably be traced to the idea of gathering together the literary remains of those who flourished in the age immediately succeeding the Apostles, and who presumably therefore were their direct personal disciples. This idea first took shape in the edition of Cotelier during the last half of the seventeenth century (A.D. 1672). Indeed such a collection would have been an impossibility a few years earlier. The first half of that century saw in print for the first time the Epistles of Clement (A.D. 1633), and of Barnabas (A.D. 1645), to say nothing of the original Greek of Polycarp's Epistle (A.D. 1633) and the Ignatian Letters in their genuine form (A.D. 1644, 1646). The materials therefore would have been too scanty for such a project at any previous epoch. In his title page however Cotelier does not use the actual expression, though he approximates to it, SS. Patrum qui temporibus Apostolicis floruerunt opera; but the next editor [Thomas] Ittig (1699), adopts as his title Patres Apostolici, and thenceforward it becomes common.

== List of works ==
The following writings are generally grouped together as having been written by the Apostolic Fathers (in italics are writings whose authors are unknown):

- Letters attributed to Clement of Rome
  - The First Epistle of Clement
  - The Second Epistle of Clement (contested authorship; see § Clement of Rome)
- Seven epistles of Ignatius of Antioch
- The Martyrium Ignatii
- The Epistle of Polycarp
- The Martyrdom of Polycarp
- Fragments of the writings of Papias of Hierapolis, which have survived as quotations in later writers
- One short fragment of the Apology of Quadratus of Athens
- The Didache
- The Epistle of Barnabas
- The Epistle to Diognetus (Note: Some editors place the Epistle to Diognetus among the apologetic writings, rather than among the Apostolic Fathers (Stevenson, J. A New Eusebius SPCK (1965) p. 400).)
- The Shepherd of Hermas

Additionally some have argued that the Odes of Solomon was written by a student of the Apostle John around the middle of the first century.

All or most of these works were originally written in Greek. Older English translations of these works can be found online in the Ante-Nicene Fathers series on the Christian Classics Ethereal Library website. Published English translations have also been made by various scholars of early Christianity, such as Joseph Lightfoot, Kirsopp Lake, Bart D. Ehrman and Michael W. Holmes. (Note: For a review of the most recent editions of the Apostolic Fathers and an overview of the current state of scholarship, see Timothy B. Sailors, "Bryn Mawr Classical Review: Review of The Apostolic Fathers: Greek Texts and English Translations".) The first English translation of the Apostolic Fathers' works was published in 1693, by William Wake, then rector of Westminster St James, later Archbishop of Canterbury. (Note: The translation was entitled The Genuine Epistles of the Apostolical Fathers, St. Barnabas, St. Clement, St. Ignatius, St. Polycarp, the Shepherd of Hermas, and the Martyrdoms of St. Ignatius and St. Polycarp written by Those who were Present at Their Sufferings.) It was virtually the only English translation available until the mid-19th century. Since its publication many better manuscripts of the Apostolic Fathers' works have been discovered. (Note: Wake's 1693 translation is still available to this day, reprinted in a volume (first published in 1820) now being sold under the title The Lost Books of the Bible and the Forgotten Books of Eden, which is described at length in chapter 15 of Edgar J. Goodspeed, Modern Apocrypha (Boston: Beacon Press, 1956).)

There are several Greek text editions:

- The Apostolic Fathers. Vol. 1. I Clement. II Clement. Ignatius. Polycarp. Didache. Barnabas. Loeb Classical Library. Cambridge: Harvard University Press, 1912 Kirsopp Lake
- The Apostolic Fathers. Vol. 2. Shepherd of Hermas. Martyrdom of Polycarp. Epistle to Diognetus. Loeb Classical Library. Cambridge: Harvard University Press, 1913 Kirsopp Lake
- The Apostolic Fathers. Vol. 1. I Clement. II Clement. Ignatius. Polycarp. Didache. Loeb Classical Library. Cambridge: Harvard University Press, 2003 Bart Ehrman (replaced Lake)
- The Apostolic Fathers. Vol. 2. Epistle of Barnabas. Papias and Quadratus. Epistle to Diognetus. The Shepherd of Hermas. Loeb Classical Library. Cambridge: Harvard University Press, 2005 Bart Ehrman (replaced Lake)
- The Apostolic Fathers: Greek Texts and English Translations. 3rd Edition. Grand Rapids: Baker, 2007 Michael Holmes
- Die Apostolischen Väter. Tübingen: Mohr Siebeck, 1992 Andreas Lindemann and Henning Paulsen (German)

== Fathers ==
=== Clement of Rome ===
Clement of Rome (c. 35–99) was bishop of Rome from 88 to 99. Irenaeus and Tertullian list him as the fourth bishop after Peter, Linus and Anacletus. He was said to have been consecrated by Peter the Apostle, and he is known to have been a leading member of the Church in Rome in the late 1st century.

The First Epistle of Clement (c. AD 96) was copied and widely read and is generally considered to be the oldest Christian epistle in existence outside of the New Testament. The letter is extremely lengthy, twice as long as the Epistle to the Hebrews, (Note: The Lightfoot translation of the First Epistle of Clement is 13,316 words; the Epistle to the Hebrews is only 7,300–7,400 words (depending on the translation).) and it demonstrates the author's familiarity with many books of both the Old Testament and New Testament. The epistle repeatedly refers to the Old Testament as scripture and includes numerous references to the Book of Judith, thereby establishing usage or at least familiarity with Judith in his time. Within the letter, Clement calls on the Christians of Corinth to maintain harmony and order. Tradition identifies the author as Clement, bishop of Rome, and scholarly consensus is overwhelmingly in favor of the letter's authenticity.

The Second Epistle of Clement was traditionally ascribed by some ancient authors to Clement, but it is now generally considered to have been written later, c. AD 140–160, and therefore could not be the work of Clement, who died in 99. Doubts about the authorship of the letter had already been expressed in antiquity by Eusebius and Jerome. Whereas 1 Clement was an epistle, 2 Clement appears to be a transcript of an oral homily or sermon, perhaps making it the oldest surviving Christian sermon outside of the New Testament.

=== Ignatius of Antioch ===
Ignatius of Antioch (also known as Theophorus, from the Greek for God-bearer) (c. 35–110) was bishop of Antioch. He may have known the apostle John directly, and his thought is certainly influenced by the tradition associated with this apostle. En route to his martyrdom in Rome, Ignatius wrote a series of letters which have been preserved as an example of the theology of the earliest Christians. Important topics addressed in these letters include ecclesiology, the sacraments, the role of bishops, and the nature of biblical Sabbath. He clearly identifies the local-church hierarchy composed of bishop, presbyters, and deacons and claims to have spoken in some of the churches through the inspiration of the Holy Spirit. He is the second after Clement to mention the Pauline epistles.

=== Polycarp of Smyrna ===
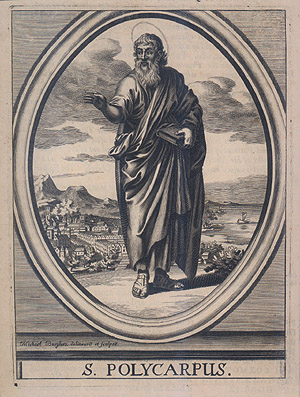
St. Polycarp, depicted with a book as a symbol of his writings.

Polycarp (c. AD 69 – c. 155) was bishop of Smyrna (now İzmir in Turkey). His student Irenaeus wrote that he "was not only instructed by the apostles, and conversed with many who had seen the Lord, but was also appointed bishop by apostles in Asia and in the church in Smyrna", and that he had, as a boy, listened to "the accounts which (Polycarp) gave of his intercourse with John and with the others who had seen the Lord". The options for this John are John the son of Zebedee, traditionally viewed as the author of the Fourth Gospel, or John the Presbyter. Traditional advocates follow Eusebius in insisting that the apostolic connection of Papius was with John the Evangelist, and that this John, the author of the Gospel of John, was the same as the apostle John.

Polycarp tried and failed to persuade Anicetus, bishop of Rome, to have the West celebrate Easter on 14 Nisan, as in the East. He rejected the bishop's suggestion that the East use the Western date. In 155, the Smyrnans demanded Polycarp's execution as a Christian, and he died a martyr. His story has it that the flames built to kill him refused to burn him, and that when he was stabbed to death, so much blood issued from his body that it quenched the flames around him. Polycarp is recognized as a saint in both the Roman Catholic and Eastern Orthodox churches.

=== Papias of Hierapolis ===
Papias of Hierapolis (c. 60 – c. 130) was bishop of Hierapolis (now Pamukkale in Turkey). Irenaeus describes him as "an ancient man who was a hearer of John and a companion of Polycarp". Eusebius adds that Papias was Bishop of Hierapolis around the time of Ignatius of Antioch. The name Papias (Παπίας) was very common in the region, suggesting that he was probably a native of the area.

Papias's major work was the Exposition of the Sayings of the Lord (Greek: Λογίων Κυριακῶν Ἐξήγησις) in five books; it has been lost and only survives in excerpts from Irenaeus and Eusebius. Other fragments come from the works of Philip of Side and George Hamartolos, but the authenticity of those are dubious.

=== Quadratus of Athens ===
Quadratus of Athens (died c. 129) was bishop of Athens. Eusebius reports that he was a disciple of the apostles (auditor apostolorum) and that he was appointed as bishop after the martyrdom of his predecessor Publius. Quadratus's major work is the Apology, which was apparently read to Emperor Hadrian to convince him to improve imperial policy toward Christians. It has been lost and only survives in an excerpt from Eusebius.

== Other sub-apostolic literature ==
=== Didache ===
The Didache (Ancient Greek: Διδαχή, romanized: Didakhé, lit. 'Teaching') is a brief early Christian treatise, dated anywhere from as early as AD 50 to the end of the 1st century. It contains instructions for Christian communities. The text, parts of which may have constituted the first written catechism, has three main sections dealing with Christian lessons, rituals such as baptism and the Eucharist, and church organization. It was considered by some of the Church Fathers as part of the New Testament but rejected as spurious (non-canonical) by others. Scholars knew of the Didache through references in other texts, but the text had been lost; it was rediscovered in 1873 by Philotheos Bryennios, Metropolitan of Nicomedia, in the Codex Hierosolymitanus.

=== Shepherd of Hermas ===
The 2nd-century The Shepherd of Hermas was popular in the early church and was even considered scriptural by some of the Church Fathers such as Irenaeus and Tertullian. It was written in Rome in Koine Greek. The Shepherd had great authority in the 2nd and 3rd centuries. The work comprises five visions, 12 mandates, and 10 parables. It relies on allegory and pays special attention to the Church, calling the faithful to repent of the sins that have harmed it.

=== Epistle to Diognetus ===
The Epistle to Diognetus, sometimes called Mathetes or Epistle of Mathetes to Diogentus, is the first extant Christian apology. In the apology, the anonymous author explains to a pagan friend who wants to know more about the new religion. The epistle talks mainly about the incarnation of Logos (Jesus Christ), the errors of paganism and Judaism, and explain about the Christian lifestyle. This work is thought to have been written around 130 AD.

== Theology ==
The writings of the Apostolic Fathers reveal the development of distinct theological schools or orientations: Asia Minor and Syria, Rome, and Alexandria. The school of Asia Minor (represented by the Johannine literature, Ignatius, Polycarp, and Papias) stressed union with Christ for attaining eternal life. For Ignatius, the eucharist unites the believer to the passion of Christ. He wrote that it was "the medicine of immortality, the antidote which results not in dying but in living forever in Jesus Christ". The writings of Papias taught historic premillennialism—the belief that the Second Coming will inaugurate Jesus' thousand year reign on earth (the millennium).

Roman Christianity (represented by Clement and Hermas) was influenced by Stoicism and stressed ethics and morality. Hermas taught that a person could be forgiven once for postbaptismal sin (sins committed after baptism). Hermas also introduced the idea of works of supererogation (to do more than the commandments of God require). This concept would contribute to the later development of the treasury of merit and the Western Church's penitential system.

The Alexandrian school (represented by the Epistle of Barnabas) was influenced by Middle Platonism and Neoplatonism. It combined a focus on ethics with an allegorical interpretation of the Old Testament in the tradition of Philo. The author of the Epistle of Barnabas used an allegorical interpretation of the Old Testament to harmonize it with Christian teachings. The stories of the Old Testament were understood to be types that point to the saving work of Jesus.

The Apostolic Fathers, all of whom were Gentiles, struggled with the authority of the Old Covenant and the relationship between Judaism and Christianity. The Epistle of Barnabas 14.3-4 claimed the tablets of the covenant were destroyed at Sinai and that Israel had no covenant with God.

The Apostolic Fathers use Trinitarian language, such as that written by Clement: "Have we not one God and one Christ and one Spirit of grace, the Spirit that has been poured out on us?" While Christology remained undeveloped, the Apostolic Fathers agreed on the pre-existence of Christ, as well as both his divinity and humanity. Ignatius referred to Jesus as "our God" and wrote that "The one God manifested himself through Jesus Christ his Son who is his Word that proceeded from silence". When opposing Docetism—a movement that denied the humanity of Jesus and therefore his Incarnation—Ignatius wrote, "There is one Physician: both flesh and spirit, begotten and unbegotten, in man, God, in death, true life, both from Mary and from God, first passible and then impassible, Jesus Christ our Lord". In The Shepherd of Hermas, the pre-incarnation Son of God is referred to as: "the holy pre-existent Spirit which created the whole creation God made to dwell in flesh that he desired. This flesh therefore in which the Holy Spirit dwelt was subject to the Spirit ... He chose this flesh as a partner with the Holy Spirit". The usage of the term "Holy Spirit" in The Shepherd of Hermas is often not specific to the third Person of the Trinity, and sometimes refers to a human spirit made holy by the grace of God.

The Apostolic Fathers do not seem to share a single concept of church polity or organization. In the Didache, prophets are the preeminent leaders of the church with bishops and deacons in subordinate roles. It is possible this arrangement represents "a period of transition between the primitive system of charismatic authority and the hierarchical organization that was slowly developing within the church". Other writers stress the importance of bishops as leaders of the church. In an early articulation of apostolic succession, Clement teaches that the apostles appointed bishops (or presbyters) and deacons to lead the church. Ignatius provided the earliest description of a monarchical bishop, writing that "all are to respect the deacons as Jesus Christ and the bishop as a copy of the Father and the presbyters as the council of God and the band of the apostles. For apart from these no group can be called a church".

The Apostolic Fathers placed great importance on baptism. According to theologian Geoffrey Hugo Lampe, the Fathers considered baptism to be "the seal with which believers are marked out as God's people, the way of death to sin and demons and of rebirth to resurrection-life, the new white robe which must be preserved undefiled, the shield of Christ's soldier, the sacrament of the reception of the Holy Spirit." The Apostolic Fathers also clearly considered the eucharist to be the center of Christian worship. Ignatius identified the eucharist closely with the death and resurrection of Christ—"it is the flesh of our Saviour Jesus Christ, which flesh suffered for our sins and which the Father raised up".

== See also ==
- Christian apologetics
- Doctor of the Church
- Ante-Nicene Fathers (book)
- Ecumenical Councils
- Nicene and Post-Nicene Fathers
