= Meqabyan =

Three Ge'ez Ethiopian biblical books

Meqabyan (Amharic: መቃብያን, romanized: Mek'abiyan, also transliterated as Makabian or Mäqabeyan), also referred to as Ethiopian Maccabees and Ethiopic Maccabees, are three books found only in the Ethiopian Orthodox Old Testament Biblical canon. The language of composition of these books is Geʽez, also called Classical Ethiopic, although they are more commonly found in Amharic today. These books are entirely different in their scope, content and subject from the more well-known books of Maccabees found in Catholic and Eastern Orthodox Bibles.

== Overview ==
The account of the Maccabees described in these sacred texts are not those of the advent of the Hasmonean dynasty of Judea. Neither are they an account of the "Five Holy Maccabean Martyrs", nor the "woman with seven sons", who were also referred to as 'Maccabees' and are revered in Orthodox Christianity as the "Holy Maccabean Martyrs". The Maccabees referred to do not correspond to known martyrology and their identity is never fully clarified by the ancient author. However, they do assume the familiar moniker of being "a Maccabee", the etymological origins of which remain disputed.

Some suggestion has been made that the text of the three books of Ethiopian Maccabees was intended to be read in parallel with the Book of Jubilees found elsewhere in the Ethiopian deuterocanon. Liturgically they are read together within the seasons of the Ethiopian Orthodox Church. There has also been some comparison of the three texts and that of the Book of Josippon, which might be part of the source material for the second and third books. It has been suggested that the Ethiopian church had no knowledge of the deuterocanonical Books of the Maccabees until well into the 14th century, and that the composition of the Meqabyan must have taken place sometime in the high medieval period. Unlike other Ethiopian texts, such as the Book of Enoch, academic scholarship into these texts has been limited; they have only been made available in English recently.

== First Book of Ethiopian Maccabees (1 Meqabyan) ==
The text has 36 chapters in total, and gives the account of two separate revolts against Seleucid rule over Judea. The first account begins by stating that there was an idol-worshipping king of Media and Midian who is devoted to the cult of his idols. Unlike the more familiar narrative found in the books of Maccabees, his name is given as "Tsirutsaydan"; this is possibly a folk memory of the historical Seleucid king Antiochus IV Epiphanes, who held court at the Phoenician cities, after he began minting coins with the names "Tyre and Sidon" (Tsur u Tsaydan) stamped in Punic alongside his image.

According to this book, a certain man from the territory of Benjamin called Maccabeus had three sons: Abijah (Amharic: አብያ), Shelah (Amharic: ሴላ), and Pantera (Amharic: ፓንደር), who opposed the tyrannical policies of the king and refused to worship his idols. Their account consumes only a short section of the book, spanning chapters 1 through chapter 4. They are noted elsewhere in the hagiographical text of the Ethiopian Synaxarion, and hold a feast day within the Ethiopian Church.

A second group of brothers are later introduced in chapter 15. They are called Judah (Amharic: ይሁዳ), Meqabis (Maccabeus) and Mebikyas, and they are said to have led a successful revolt against the ruthless King Akrandis of Midian. This is possibly a historical allusion to the king Alexander I Balas, who ruled the Seleucid Empire after the death of Antiochus IV, and who supported the legitimacy of the Maccabees cause. However, in this folk rendering of history, Mebikyas enters the king's military camp and decapitates him at his dinner table, while his food was still in his mouth.

The rest of the book contains no further narratives about the Maccabeans and offers no further historical narrative, instead focusing on principles such as the primacy of God, the resurrection of the dead, the importance of good works, and the vanity of earthly power, often illustrated using examples from the Old Testament. Much of the text is interested in the judgment of God over the righteous and the unrighteous. Chapters 18 and 19 seem to contradict 1 Enoch regarding the origin of the Nephilim, depicting them as descendants of Cain's sons and Seth's daughters, whereas the Enochian literature identifies their fathers, the Watchers, as fallen angels.

== Second Book of Ethiopian Maccabees (2 Meqabyan) ==
The Second Book of Ethiopian Maccabees contains twenty-one chapters in total. Chapters 1-5 recounts that a man named Maccabeus made war against Israel, which was God's punishment for their sins. He later repents and is taught the law of the God of Israel by the prophet Rei, until the time of his death. Thereafter, his children are attacked by King Tseerutsaydan. Chapters 6–8 and 12–13 recount the same narrative of First Ethiopian Maccabees of the brothers who refuse to worship Tseerutsaydan's idols. Included in the text's more general religious teachings, are a strong emphasis on the doctrine of physical resurrection of the body and the sectarian splits in 1st century Judaism.

== Third Book of Ethiopian Maccabees (3 Meqabyan) ==
The Third Book of Ethiopian Maccabees is the shortest of the three books, containing 10 chapters. At times, within the liturgical practices of the Ethiopian Church, the 2nd and 3rd Books of Meqabyan are collapsed to form a single text. It is a diffuse account of salvation and punishment, and the importance of maintaining faith in God, illustrated from the lives of various Biblical patriarchs, such as Adam, Job, and David. Much of the book is concerned with the Devil and how he tempts humans to sin. It is stated that the Devil was originally an angel who was punished by God for arrogantly refusing to bow down to his creation Adam (this same story appears in various non-canonical Apocryphal works concerning Adam, as well in the Iblis narratives of the Quran).

== Editions ==
=== Ge'ez ===
- British Library Or. 506, an 18th Century Geʽez manuscript containing the three books of Meqabyan from folia 4r to 87r. The 2nd book starts on folio 53r, and the third starts on folio 75r.

=== English ===
- Selassie, Feqade, ed. (2005). "Book of Meqabyan" (in Iyaric). Published online. Archives: 1, 2, 3
- Selassie, Feqade, ed. (2008-01-21). Ethiopian Books of Meqabyan 1–3, in Standard English. Virginia: Lulu.com.
- Curtin, D.P.; Tesfaye, Bekele (2018). First Book of Ethiopian Maccabees: with commentary. Dalcassian Press. ISBN 978-1-960069-20-7. (Excerpt)
- Curtin, D.P.; Tesfaye, Bekele (2023-08-01). Second Book of Ethiopian Maccabees. Dalcassian Press. ISBN 979-8-8692-1148-4.
