= Intertestamental period =

Period between the Old and New Testaments of the Bible

The intertestamental period (Protestant) or deuterocanonical period (Catholic and Eastern Orthodox) is the period of time between the events of the protocanonical books and the New Testament. It is considered to cover roughly 400 years, spanning from the ministry of Malachi (c. 420 BC) to the appearance of John the Baptist in the early 1st century AD. It is roughly contiguous with the Second Temple period (516 BC–70 AD) and encompasses the age of Hellenistic Judaism.

It is known by some Protestants as the "400 Silent Years" because according to their faith, it was a period when no new prophets were raised and God revealed nothing new to the Jewish people. Many of the deuterocanonical books, accepted as scripture by the Catholic Church and Eastern Orthodoxy, were written during this time, as were many pseudepigraphal works, the Biblical apocrypha and Jewish apocrypha. An understanding of the events of the intertestamental period provides historical and literary context for the New Testament.

== Significant events ==
- Beginnings of the Jewish diaspora and Hellenistic Judaism
- Establishment of the first synagogues
- Change in common language from Biblical Hebrew to Aramaic and Hellenistic Greek
- The events of the Maccabean Revolt, as documented in the Books of the Maccabees
- Reign of the Hasmonean and Herodian dynasties, followed by Roman rule
- Production of the Greek Septuagint, the first translation of the Hebrew scriptures into another language
- Writing of the Dead Sea Scrolls, the rediscovery of which became central to modern and contemporary Biblical criticism
- Writing of the deuterocanonical books (biblical apocrypha) and pseudepigrapha

== See also ==
- Babylonian captivity
- Dating the Bible
- Development of the Hebrew Bible canon
- Development of the New Testament canon
- Development of the Old Testament canon
- History of ancient Israel and Judah
- Kings of Judah
- Missing years (Jewish calendar)
- Samaritan Pentateuch
