= First Epistle of Clement =

Letter addressed to the Christians in the city of Corinth

The First Epistle of Clement (Ancient Greek: Κλήμεντος πρὸς Κορινθίους, romanized: Klḗmentos pròs Korinthíous, lit. 'Clement to Corinthians') is a letter addressed to the Christians in the city of Corinth. The work is internally anonymous, but it is attributed to Clement I, the fourth bishop of Rome, which most scholars hold to be true. Based on internal evidence, some scholars say the letter was composed some time before AD 70, but the most common time given for the epistle's composition is at the end of the reign of Domitian (c. AD 96). As the name suggests, a Second Epistle of Clement is known, but this is a later work by a different author.

The letter is a response to events in Corinth, where the congregation had deposed certain presbyters. The author called on the congregation to repent, to restore the presbyters to their position, and to obey their superiors. He said that the Apostles had appointed the church leadership and directed them on how to perpetuate the ministry. In Corinth, the letter was read aloud from time to time. This practice spread to other churches, and Christians translated it from the original Greek into Latin, Syriac, and other languages. The work was lost for centuries, but since the 1600s various copies or fragments have been found and studied. It has provided valuable evidence about the structure of the early church.

Part of the Apostolic Fathers collection, some early Christians treated the work as a sacred text. It was included in some Bibles, such as the Codex Alexandrinus and Codex Hierosolymitanus, but not in the 27-book New Testament canon that is shared across most modern Christian churches. Such works are known as New Testament apocrypha, and 1 Clement ranks with Didache as one of the earliest, if not the earliest, of those that still exist.

== Authorship and date ==
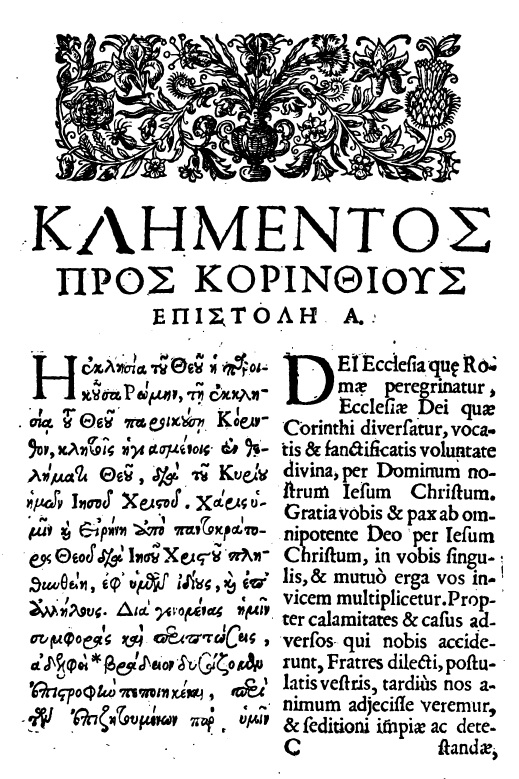
Original Greek and Latin translation

Although traditionally attributed to Clement of Rome, the letter does not include Clement's name, and is anonymous, though scholars generally consider it to be genuine. The epistle is addressed as "the Church of God which sojourneth in Rome to the Church of God which sojourneth in Corinth". Its stylistic coherence suggests a single author.

Scholars have proposed a range of dates, but most limit the possibilities to the last three decades of the 1st century, and no later than AD 140. The most common time given for the epistle's composition is at the end of the reign of Domitian (c. AD 96). The phrase "sudden and repeated misfortunes and hindrances which have befallen us" (1:1) is taken as a reference to persecutions under Domitian. Thus some scholars believe that 1 Clement was written around the same time as the Book of Revelation (c. AD 95–97).

Irenaeus (c. 130 – c. 202 AD) mentions the letter in his book Against Heresies III (180 AD).

In the time of this Clement, no small dissension having occurred among the brethren at Corinth, the Church in Rome dispatched a most powerful letter to the Corinthians, exhorting them to peace, renewing their faith, and declaring the tradition which it had lately received from the apostles, proclaiming the one God, omnipotent, the Maker of heaven and earth, the Creator of man, who brought on the deluge, and called Abraham, who led the people from the land of Egypt, spoke with Moses, set forth the law, sent the prophets, and who has prepared fire for the devil and his angels. From this document, whosoever chooses to do so, may learn that He, the Father of our Lord Jesus Christ, was preached by the Churches, and may also understand the apostolic tradition of the Church, since this Epistle is of older date than these men who are now propagating falsehood, and who conjure into existence another god beyond the Creator and the Maker of all existing things.

— St. Irenaeus, Against Heresies III, Chapter 3:3

== Content ==
The letter was occasioned by a dispute in Corinth, which had led to the removal from office of several presbyters. Since none of the presbyters were charged with moral offences, 1 Clement charges that their removal was high-handed and unjustifiable. The letter is extremely lengthy—twice as long as the Epistle to the Hebrews—and includes many references to the Old Testament.

1 Clement offers valuable evidence about the state of the ministry in the early church. He calls on the Corinthians to repent and to reinstate the leaders that they had deposed. He explains that the Apostles had appointed "bishops and deacons", that they had given instructions on how to perpetuate the ministry, and that Christians were to obey their superiors. The author uses the terms bishops (overseers, episkopos) and elders (presbyters) interchangeably.

New Testament references include admonition to "Take up the epistle of the blessed Paul the Apostle" (xlvii. 1) which was written to this Corinthian audience; a reference which seems to imply written documents available at both Rome and Corinth. 1 Clement also alludes to the first epistle of Paul to the Corinthians; and alludes to Paul's epistles to the Romans, Galatians, Ephesians, and Philippians, Titus, 1 Timothy, numerous phrases from the Epistle to the Hebrews, and possible material from Acts. There is no trace in Clement of a knowledge of 1 and 2 Thessalonians or the epistle of Philemon; (Note: This may be, however, due to the brevity of 1 and 2 Thessalonians and the epistle of Philemon, as well as their particular purpose of writing or their content.) however, Clement may have had indirect knowledge of 2 Corinthians, Colossians, and 2 Timothy because of the relationship with the other epistles alluded to. In several instances, the author asks their readers to "remember" the words of Jesus, although they do not attribute these sayings to a specific written account. These New Testament allusions are employed as authoritative sources which strengthen the letter's arguments to the Corinthian church. According to Bruce Metzger, Clement never explicitly refers to these New Testament references as "Scripture".

Additionally, 1 Clement possibly references the martyrdom of Paul and Peter (sections 5:4 to 6:1).

1 Clement was written at a time when some Christians were keenly aware that Jesus had not returned as they had expected. Like the Second Epistle of Peter, this epistle criticizes those who had doubts about the faith because the Second Coming had not yet occurred.

== Canonical rank ==
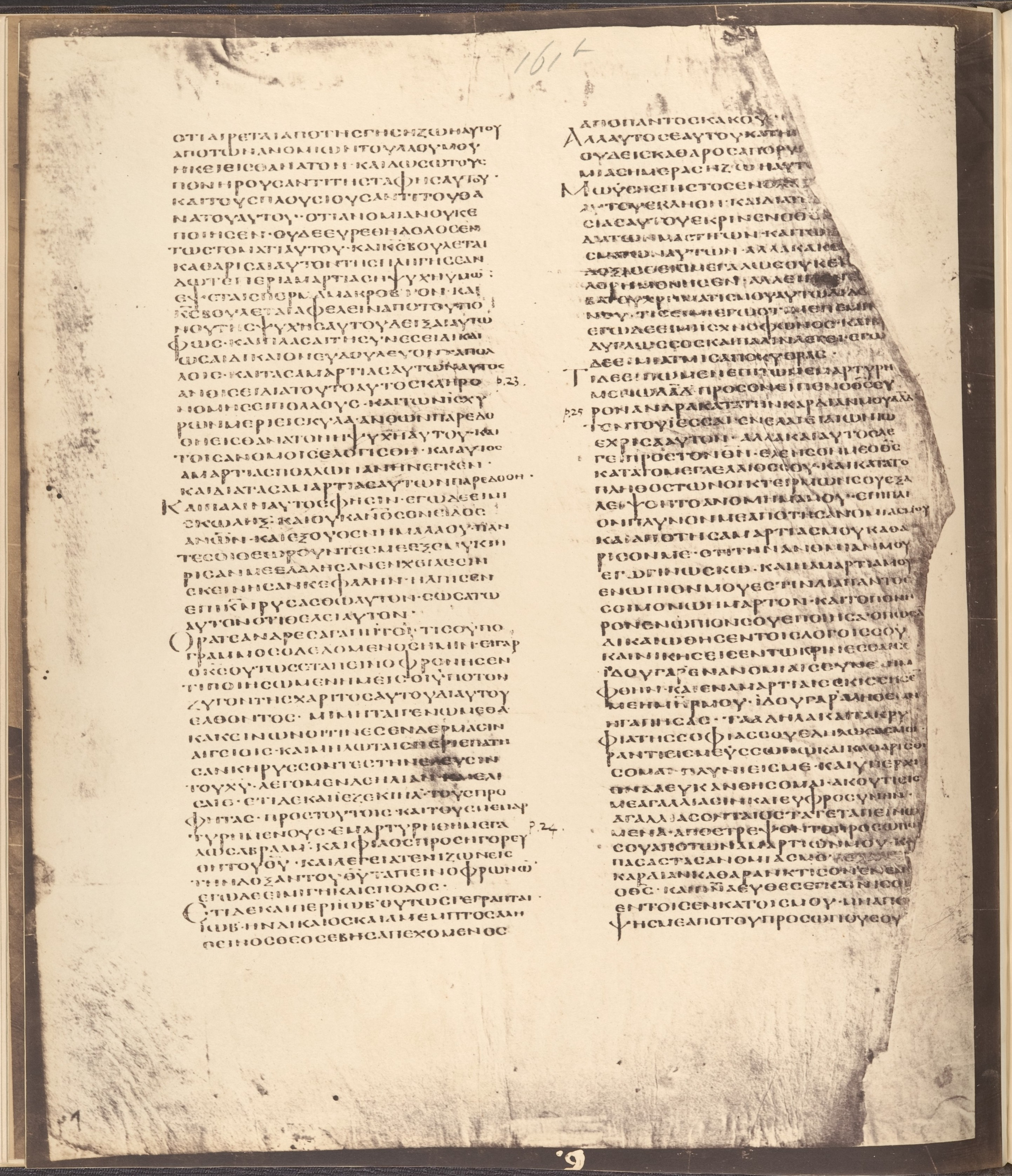
Facsimile of the Epistle of Clement, from the Codex Alexandrinus

The epistle was publicly read from time to time in Corinth, and by the 4th century this usage had spread to other churches. It was included in the 5th century Codex Alexandrinus, which contained the entire Old and New Testaments. It was included with the Gospel of John in the fragmentary early Greek and Akhmimic Coptic papyrus designated Papyrus 6. First Clement is listed as canonical in "Canon 85" of the Canons of the Apostles, showing that First Clement had canonical rank in at least some regions of early Christendom. Ibn Khaldun also mentions it as part of the New Testament, suggesting that the book may have been in wide and accepted use in either 14th century Spain or Egypt.

== Relation with other writings ==
Dale Allison considers 1 Clement 13:2 to be independent of the Synoptic Gospels but closer to Luke than Matthew. Frank Dicken finds a dependence by 1 Clement on Luke-Acts.

== Sources ==
Though known from antiquity, the first document to contain the Epistle of Clement and to be studied by Western scholars was found in 1628, having been included with an ancient Greek Bible given by the Patriarch of Constantinople Cyril I to King Charles I of England. The first complete copy of 1 Clement was rediscovered in 1873, some four hundred years after the Fall of Constantinople, when Philotheos Bryennios found it in the Greek Codex Hierosolymitanus, written in 1056. This work, written in Greek, was translated into at least three languages in ancient times: a Latin translation from the 2nd or 3rd century was found in an 11th-century manuscript in the seminary library of Namur, Belgium, and published by Germain Morin in 1894; a Syriac manuscript, now at Cambridge University, was found by Robert Lubbock Bensly in 1876, and translated by him into English in 1899; and a Coptic translation has survived in two papyrus copies, one published by C. Schmidt in 1908 and the other by F. Rösch in 1910.

The Namur Latin translation reveals its early date in several ways. Its early date is attested to by not being combined with the pseudepigraphic later Second Epistle of Clement, as all the other translations are found, and by showing no knowledge of the church terminology that became current later—for example, translating Greek presbyteroi as seniores rather than transliterating to presbyteri.

== See also ==
- Papyrus 6
- Second Epistle of Clement
