= Jean-Baptiste Cotelier =

Jean-Baptiste Cotelier or Cotelerius (born December, 1629, Nîmes; died 19 August 1686, Paris) was a Patristic scholar and Catholic theologian.

== Life ==
His early education was under the personal direction of his father, at one time a Protestant minister, but later a convert to Catholicism. He was reportedly able to interpret the Bible in the original Hebrew and Greek before the General Assembly of the French clergy in Mantes (1641); he made such a favourable impression on the clergy that they increased his father's pension. During the period of his theological studies at Paris (1641–47), Cotelier's intellectual qualities procured for him an introduction to the king (1644). He graduated as bachelor in theology in 1647 at the Sorbonne, of which he became a member in 1648, though he never received priestly ordination.

In 1654, he accompanied Georges d'Aubusson de la Feuillade, Archbishop of Embrun, to his diocese, and became his counsellor. He returned, in 1659, to Paris and again devoted himself to study. With the philologist Du Cange he was commissioned in 1667 by Minister Colbert to investigate and catalogue the Greek manuscripts of the Royal Library. In 1676 he was appointed professor of the Greek language in the Collège Royal in Paris.

== The Origin of the Term 'Apostolic Fathers' ==
Although the origin of the term 'Apostolic Fathers' has been debated, it is widely traced back to Cotelier's 1672 collection SS. Patrum qui temporibus apostolicis floruerunt ("Works of the holy fathers who flourished in apostolic times"). In his work on Clement of Rome, J.B. Lightfoot noted that, in his title, "Cotelier does not use the actual expression, though he approximates to it ... the next editor, [Thomas] Ittig (1699) adopts as his title Patres Apostolici, and thenceforward it becomes common." On Lightfoot's reading, the terminus technicus is born with Ittig.

The term was used loosely before 1672, however not yet as a terminus technicus. David Lincicum suggests that there is a strong possibility that the birth of the categorisation is owed to varied paratextual attempts to shorten Cotelier's title that can be traced back to at least 1674. He argues that "[t]he birth of the term 'apostolic fathers' (patres apostolici and Latin variants) can now be seen as a sort of polygenetic paratextual phenomenon, as librarians, book-owners and booksellers decided how to shorten Cotelier's long Latin title for display on the spine. These short titles then sometimes became the way in which Cotelier was cited in the following decades ... readers who encountered Cotelier's collected texts as the writings of Patres apostolici might have been moved to consider the collection a discrete set of writings grouped together on the basis of their authors' temporal and, one presumes, theological proximity to the apostles."

== Works ==
The editions of ancient writings prepared by Cotelier were, in chronological order:

1. Homiliæ quatuor in Psalmos et interpretatio prophetiæ Danielis, græce et latine (Paris, 1661). He attributed these unpublished homilies to John Chrysostom; other critics, owing to the diversity of style, have held a different opinion.
2. SS. Patrum qui temporibus apostolicis floruerunt, Barnabæ, Clementis, Hermæ, Ignatii, Polycarpi opera edita et non edita, vera et supposita, græce et latine, cum notis (Paris, 1672). This is Cotelier's principal work. From its title was derived the designation of Apostolic Fathers for the earliest non-inspired Christian writers. Most of the copies of the work were consumed by a fire in the Collège Montaigu in Paris. Two revised editions were published by Jean Leclerc, one in Antwerp (1698), the other in Amsterdam (1724). Reprints of this last edition are found in Migne, P. G., I, II, V.
3. Ecclesiæ Græcæ Monumenta, græce et latine (Paris, 1677, 1681, 1686). The third volume of this series was published two days before the author's death.

He had collected materials for a fourth volume which was edited (1688) by the Maurists, Antoine Pouget, Bernard de Montfaucon, and Lopin, and is sometimes known as Analecta Græca. Cotelier also left several volumes of manuscripts, mainly on Christian antiquities, that were preserved in the Bibliothèque Nationale de France.
