= 5 Maccabees =

Arabic text of Judean history 186-6 BCE

The Fifth Book of the Maccabees, also called "Arabic 2 Maccabees", or "Arabic Maccabees", is an ancient Jewish work relating the history in the 2nd and 1st centuries BC. The book chronicles the events from Heliodorus' attempt to rob the Temple treasury in 186 BC to the death of Herod the Great's two sons about 6 BC.

Unlike the other Books of the Maccabees (with the exception of 3 Maccabees), the book has no relation to the Maccabean Revolt. Rather, this work aims at consoling Jews in their sufferings and encouraging them to be steadfast "in their devotion to the Mosaic law".

== Textual history ==
The book survives in Arabic, but was probably composed in Hebrew, judging from numerous Hebraisms. As no trace of a Hebrew text exists, some scholars (e.g. Zunz, Heinrich Graetz and Samuel Davidson) consider the work to have been in Arabic from Hebrew memoirs. The author probably was a Jew living some time after the destruction of the temple in 70 AD.

Some believe that the work is little more than a summary of the events in the first four Books of Maccabees and the relevant chapters in Flavius Josephus. Only chapter 12 is original. Others hold this to be potentially unlikely, and believe it may have relied upon Jason of Cyrene, Justus of Tiberias, and/or Nicolaus of Damascus.

The book bears some relationship to the history of Josippon, although there is much debate as to what that relation would have been. Many scholars on Josippon believe it is nothing more than an epitome of it. Some scholars think that this is impossible, due to the conclusion that 5 Maccabees predates Josippon, believing it to be the other way around, with Jossippon summarizing multiple works, including 5 Maccabees.

== Title ==
The book was not called "5 Maccabees" until 1832, when the name was first used by Henry Cotton and perpetuated by Samuel Davidson and others. The name "5 Maccabees" is also used to denote a text contained in the Translatio Syra Peshitto, edited by Ceriani, which however is nothing more than a Syriac version of the 6th book of Josephus' Jewish War.

== Content ==
5 Maccabees begins with the account of Heliodorus's attempt to plunder the Jerusalem Temple treasury in 186 BCE. It then traverses significant events in Jewish history, including the persecutions under Antiochus IV Epiphanes, the Maccabean Revolt, the establishment and rule of the Hasmonean dynasty, and concludes with the reign of Herod the Great, notably mentioning the execution of his wife Mariamne and their sons around 6 BCE.

The narrative is primarily a historical summary, drawing from earlier sources such as the first four Books of Maccabees and the works of Flavius Josephus. While much of the content reiterates known historical events, Chapter 12 is noted for its originality, though it contains various inaccuracies.

The overarching theme of 5 Maccabees is to provide consolation to Jews facing hardships, encouraging them to remain faithful to their traditions and laws. This perspective suggests that the author aimed to reinforce religious devotion during times of adversity.

5 Maccabees is not recognized as canonical in Jewish, Catholic, or Protestant traditions. It is considered apocryphal and is primarily of interest to scholars studying Jewish history and literature.
