= Michael W. Holmes =

- Born: Michael William Holmes; California, US
- Education: University of California, Santa Barbara (BA); Trinity Evangelical Divinity School (MA); Princeton Theological Seminary (PhD)
- Occupations: Professor, text critic, author
- Notable work: Apostolic Fathers, SBL Greek New Testament
- Theological work
- Tradition or movement: Evangelical
- Main interests: Patrology, New Testament textual criticism

Michael W. Holmes is the former Chair of the Department of Biblical and Theological Studies at Bethel University in St. Paul, Minnesota and has taught at Bethel since 1982.

== Life ==
Holmes received a BA in history from the University of California, Santa Barbara (1973), an MA in New Testament from Trinity Evangelical Divinity School (1976), and a PhD from Princeton Theological Seminary (1984). He did his PhD work under Bruce Metzger, who was widely considered to be one of the most influential New Testament scholars of the 20th century. Holmes' primary research areas are in New Testament textual criticism and the Apostolic Fathers.

He was previously on the faculty at Trinity Evangelical Divinity School and Princeton Theological Seminary, and has been visiting scholar at Luther Theological Seminary in St. Paul.

His publications include several books, around fifty articles, essays, and chapters in books. He has also written more than 220 book reviews (covering more than 240 books in 23 journals). Holmes has presented papers and invited lectures in the U.S., Canada, England, Germany, France, and Belgium. He speaks and teaches frequently at Twin Cities churches, universities, and seminaries. Holmes has served as an interim pastor at, and is a longtime member of, Trinity Baptist Church in Maplewood, Minnesota.

Holmes is a member of the International Greek New Testament Project, a member of the Editorial Board for New Testament Studies, a book review editor for Religious Studies Review, and chair of the Board of Directors of the Center for the Study of New Testament Manuscripts. He holds membership in the Studiorum Novi Testamenti Societas, the Society of Biblical Literature, the Institute for Biblical Research, and the North American Patristics Society.

Holmes and Jennifer Knust were the New Testament general editors of New Revised Standard Version Updated Edition (NRSVue), a major revision of the New Revised Standard Version (NRSV). The NRSVue project was announced in 2017, and the NRSVue was published in 2021 (digital)/2022 (print).

== Publications ==
- Holmes, Michael (1 November 2007), Apostolic Fathers, The: Greek Texts and English Translations, Grand Rapids: Baker Academic, ISBN 978-0-8010-3468-8
- Holmes, Michael, ed. (30 November 2010), The Greek New Testament: SBL Edition, Society of Biblical Literature, ISBN 978-1-58983-535-1
