= Codex Hierosolymitanus =

11th-century Greek manuscript

Codex Hierosolymitanus (also called the Bryennios manuscript or the Jerusalem Codex, often designated simply "H" in scholarly discourse) is an 11th-century (1056) Greek manuscript. It contains copies of a number of early Christian texts including the only complete edition of the Didache. It was written by an otherwise unknown scribe named Leo, who dated it 1056.

== Physical description & Paleography ==
The Codex Hierosolymitanus is a parchment manuscript produced in the small quarto format, a compact book structure prevalent in the Middle Byzantine period. The manuscript consists of 123 folios (leaves), for a total of 246 pages of text. The text is written in a single column layout, maintaining a consistent density of approximately 25 to 28 lines per page throughout the entire manuscript. The manuscript is made out of parchment, which shows standard wear, aging and minor discoloration consistent with its 11th century origin. The structural integrity of the leaves remains largely intact.

The paleographical style of the codex is a prime example of 11th century Greek minuscule script. Written in a dark brown to black ink, the writing is a fluent, neat and compact cursive minuscule characteristic of monastic scribes of the era. The script includes frequent use of standard Byzantine ligatures, abbreviations and breathing/accent marks. The texts itself shows a process of textual transmission and review; various interlinear squeezes and annotations are visible where the scribe inserted missing words, corrected spelling slips, or provided explanatory glosses alongside the main text block. The manuscript did not originally contain page numbers, but modern archivists have added modern Arabic numerals in the upper right margins for cataloging and referencing purposes.

The defining feature of the manuscript 's paleography is the explicit scribal colophon located near the final folio of the volume (folio 120v). In this final folio the scribe explicitly signs his name as "Leo". Leo recorded the completion of his work using the Byzantine calendar system, dating it to the year 6564, allowing modern historians to securely date the manuscript's creation back to the year 1056 CE.

== Discovery and Provenance ==
Prior to its modern discovery, the Codex Hierosolymitanus was located in the library of the Metochion of the Holy Sepulchre(Panagios Taphos) in the central Phanar(Fener) district of Constantinople. The Patriarchate of Jerusalem maintained three metochia dependencies across the imperial capital at the time, including properties in neighborhoods such as Neochori(Yeni Kioi) to manage its diplomatic affairs under the Ottoman empire rule. The Phanar metochion, where the Codex Hierosolymitanus was discovered, is historically dedicated to Saint George. It served as the central institution for scholars and preserved a significant collection of historical Greek manuscripts.

The manuscript was found in 1873 by Philotheos Bryennios, a highly educated scholar who was serving as a Greek Orthodox metropolitan(later becoming the Metropolitan of Nicomedia). He uncovered the manuscript while cataloging the neglected manuscript collection of the Phanar library. Initially the discovery was overlooked by the scholars, but Bryennios was mainly focused on the manuscript's inclusion of the Epistles of Clement, a set of valuable Apostolic Father texts. Bryennios transcribed the script and published the complete texts of First and Second Clement in 1875. His discovery and transcription of the text filled major gaps previously known but fragmented copies of those texts.

Years later in 1883 Bryennoios re-examined the middle folios of the codex and realized he discovered the only surviving copy of the Didache(The Teachings of the Twelve Apostles). Byrennoios then went on to publish the complete text of the Didache in 1883, causing an immediate sensation across the global academic and theological community. Many 19th century scholars and historians such as Philip Schaff documented the excitements and debates caused by this literal "time capsule" which displays early Christian ritual and community structure. Today, the codex is preserved in the Patriarchal Library of Jerusalem, officially cataloged under the shelfmark Panagios Taphos 54.

The Codex's list of books of the Hebrew Bible has often been taken for the first written Canon of the Old Testament, dating from the early second century. However, Luke J Stevens argues that the list has notable parallels in spelling of the books and in its section title to the eighth-century Doctrina Patrum, which is itself dependent on Eusebius.

== Contents of the Codex ==
The Codex Hierosolymitanus is a composite manuscript, it binds several distinct early Christian and Patristic texts into one single volume. The 11th-century scribe Leo, who originally created the codex, constructed a collection of text specifically related to the Apostolic Fathers and early church administration. This gives modern historians an idea of what an 11th-century scribe deemed important and authoritative for theological preservation.

=== Synopsis of the Old and New Testaments ===
The first section of the codex is the Synopsis of the Old and New Testaments. The text is historically attributed to John Chrysostom. It functions as a comprehensive index and commentary made to guide medieval readers to better understand the biblical canon. This section of the codex goes from folio Ir through folio 32v. The text consists of summaries of each scriptural book's narrative content, historical context, and spiritual utility within the Eastern Orthodox theological tradition. The Synopsis serves as an authoritative biblical preface. It establishes the manuscript's main function as a reference for monastic education, and an orthodox scriptural foundation for the reader before they encounter the non-canonical apostolic treatises included later in the volume.

=== First and Second Epistle of Clement ===
The Codex contains the complete texts of the First Clement and Second Clement. Before Bryennios's discovery, western scholarship only had the fragmented 5th century Codex Alexandrinus as a source, which suffered severe textual gaps and missing pages at the conclusions of both Clement texts. The discovery of the Codex Hierosolymitanus gave textual critics the first complete version of Clement texts. Allowing scholars to finally piece together their final chapters and benedictions.

=== The Epistle of Barnabas ===
In the middle folios of the volume is the Epistle of Barnabas, a late 1st to early 2nd century treatise. Although modern scholars were already familiar with the text of Barnabas through its inclusion in the famous Codex Sinaiticus, the version preserved in the Codex Hierosolymitanus provided an independent and indispensable source for comparison. This gives textual critics the chance to compare spelling variations, correct scribal copy errors, and trace how the text changed over a seven-hundred-year gap.

=== The Didache ===
The most historically significant document preserved within the codex is the Didache(The Teaching of the Twelve Apostles). This late 1st-century text was completely lost to history, known only through brief mentions and quotes in early church historian texts. The text is clearly divided into two parts. With the first part being a moral and ethical guide called "Two Ways", which contrasts the path of life with the path of death. The second part contains the oldest surviving manual for church practices and worship. It gives clear instructions to the early Christian communities on fasting and the exact recitation of the Lord's prayer, rules for performing baptisms, and the earliest Eucharistic prayers.

=== The Ignatian Epistles (Long Recension) ===
The Codex finishes off with the letters of Ignatius of Antioch in a "Long Recension" format. It is an expansion of Ignatius's original 2nd-century letters which includes additional theological phrases inserted by a later editor to address heresies such as Arianism. The expansion of Ignatius's original letters revealed how early Christian texts were altered, expanded, and adapted over time to meet changing theological concerns.

== Scholarly Significance & Impact ==
The discovery of the Codex Hierosolymitanus gave modern academics a better understanding of the sub-apostolic era and development of early Christian identity. It provides a direct, unedited window into the late 1st and early 2nd centuries early church practices and the linear process of Christian theology.

Before the recovery of the Didache from the Codex Hierosolymitanus, scholars possessed only a few primary sources of how the earliest post New Testament Christian communities conducted worship. The manuscript marked a significant shift in liturgical studies by exposing the raw, evolving nature of early church rituals. For example, it is explicitly stated that baptism must be performed in running "living water", the practice of fasting on Wednesdays and Fridays, and its Eucharistic prayers, which does not include the later, formalized sacrificial theology of the institutional church. Showing that early Christian worship was far more localized, flexible, and varied than later centuries have often portrayed.

The unique composition of the codex has been highly influential in the study of canonization, the process of deciding which early Christian books were accepted or excluded from the Bible. The codex including highly revered texts like 1 Clement and the Epistle of Barnabas, The Didache and The Synopsis, reveals how a medieval Byzantine community valued apostolic authority. It has also been crucial for textual critics as it provides complete texts of 1&2 Clement, enabling evaluation of older, fragmentary manuscripts like the Codex Alexandrinus. Its independent preservation of the Epistle of Barnabas and expanded Ignatian Epistles offers a valuable baseline to trace textual changes, glosses, and theological expansions introduced by scribes over centuries.

== Bibliography ==
- Milavec, A. (2003). The Didache: Faith, Hope, & Life of the Earliest Christian Communities, 50-70 C.E. The Newman Press significant scholarly studies. Newman Press. p. 54. ISBN 978-0-8091-0537-3.
