= Melchior Lotter =

German typographer and publisher (c. 1470–1549)

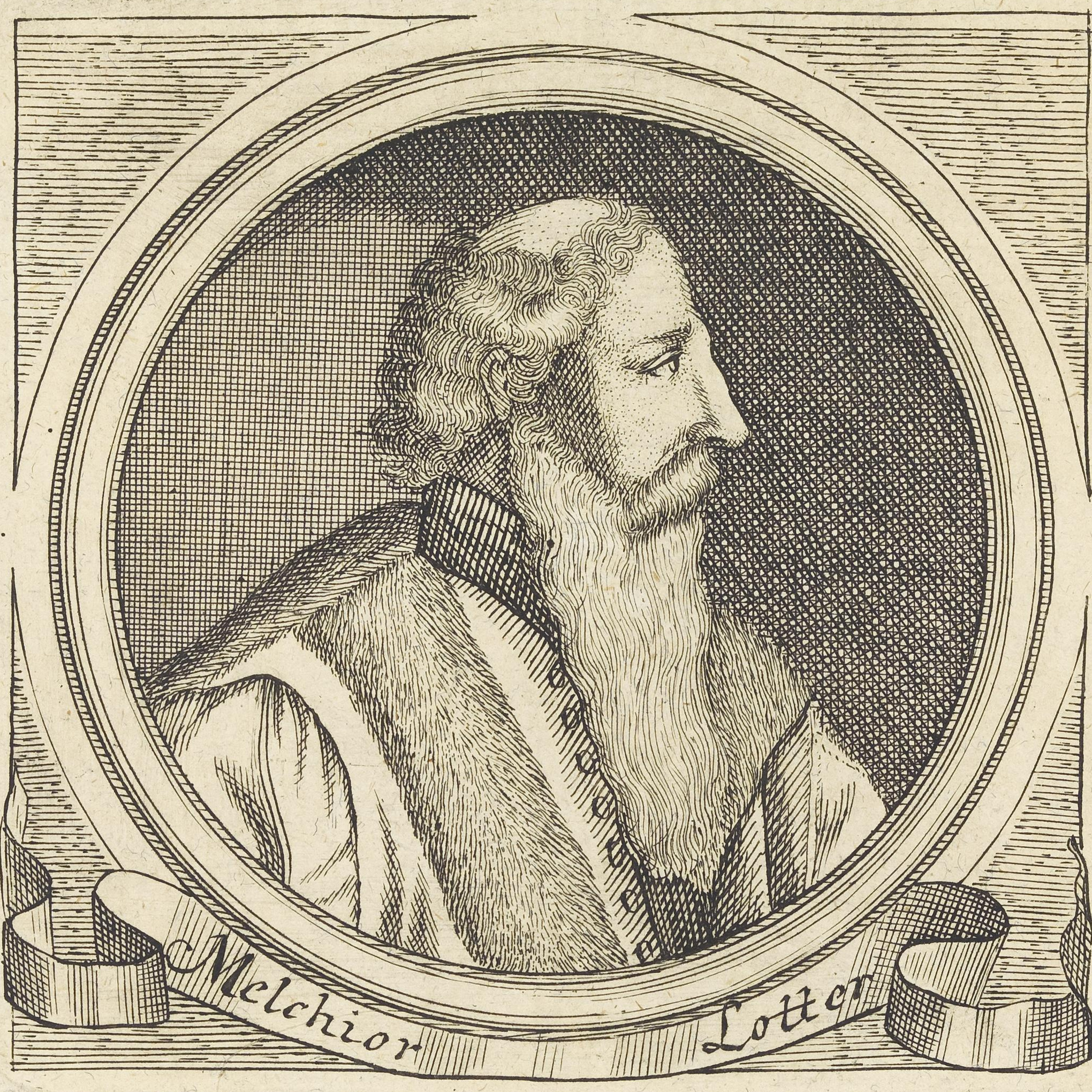
Melchior Lotter the Elder

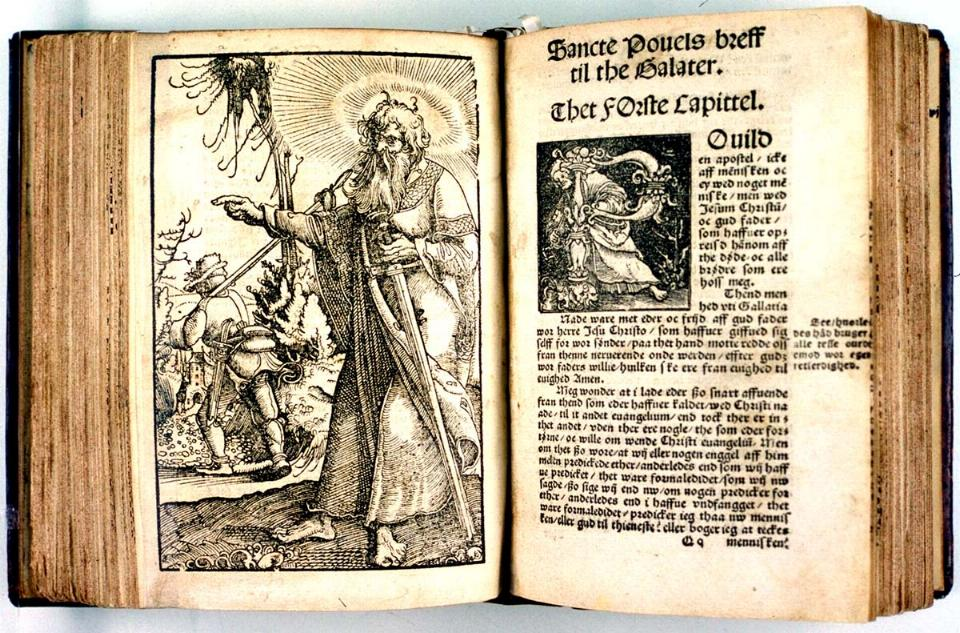
Bible printed by Lotter

Lotter was the last name of a family of German printers, intimately connected with the Reformation.

The founder of the family was Melchior Lotter, the elder, born at Aue, and well-known at Leipzig as early as 1491. He published missals, breviaries, a Persius (1512), Horatii Epistolæ (1522), and Luther Tessaradecos Consolatoria pro Laborantibus (1520). His relations with the Reformation are not perfectly clear, but he seems to have been a sympathizer. An innovation by the elder Lotter was his use of Roman types for Latin, reserving the Gothic types for German.

His son was also named Melchior (died c. 1542), which has resulted in some bibliographical confusion. Melchior, the younger, is best known for printing Martin Luther's Bible, Das Neue Testament (1522), and the impressions of 1523 and 1524 of the Old Testament, which was transferred afterward to Hans Lufft. He published many other German writings of Luther. Only a little less important was his bringing a Greek font to Wittenberg, thus giving Melanchthon the means to carry on classes in Greek. When he returned to Leipzig, about 1525, Lotter carried on his father's business.

== Works ==
Antiqua et insignis Epistola Nicolai Papa I., ad Michaelem Imperatorem. . . https://books.google.com/books?id=GeBKAAAAcAAJ&pg=false
