= Apocrypha controversy =

1820s British biblical publishing debate

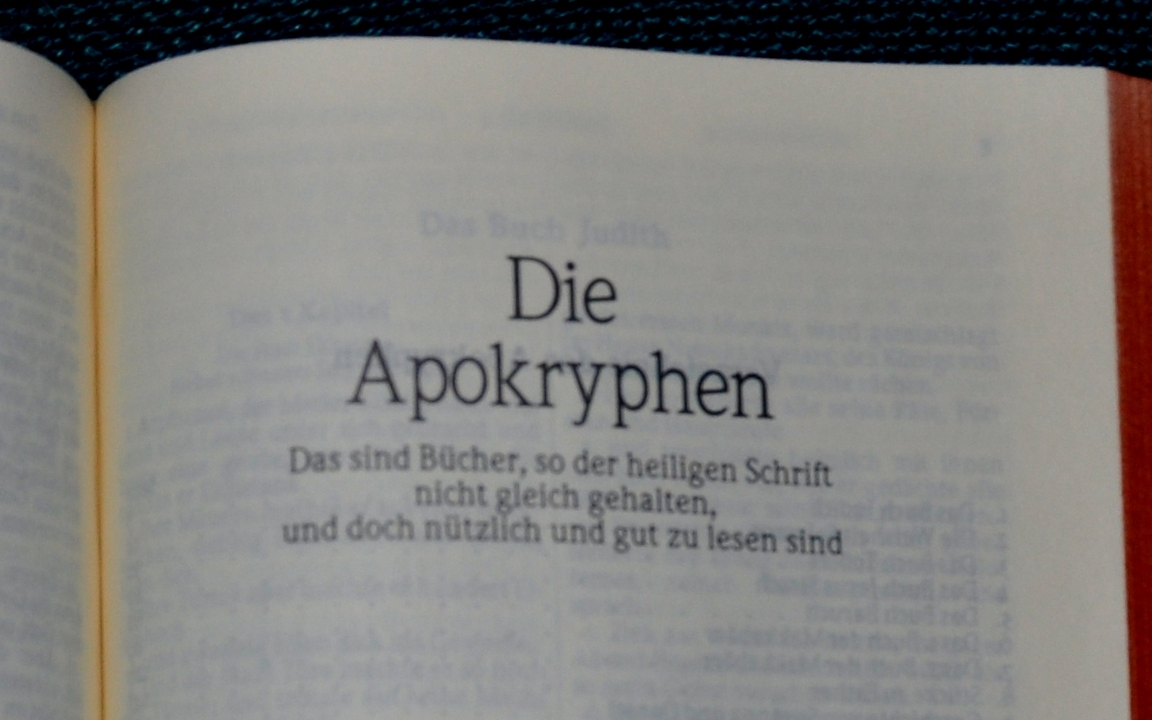
Copies of the Luther Bible include the intertestamental books as a section between the Old Testament and New Testament; they are termed the "Apocrypha" in Christian Churches having their origins in the Reformation.

The contents page in a complete 80 book King James Bible, listing "The Books of the Old Testament", "The Books called Apocrypha", and "The Books of the New Testament".

The Apocrypha controversy of the 1820s was a debate around the British and Foreign Bible Society and the issue of the inclusion of the Apocrypha in Bibles it printed for Christian missionary work.

== History ==
During the Magisterial Reformation (Evangelical-Lutheran, Reformed and Anglican), the biblical apocrypha (deuterocanonical books) were treated as intertestamental books and placed between the Old Testament and New Testament of the Christian Bible; the biblical apocrypha were deemed as non-canonical by the traditions of the Magisterial Reformation, though they were "useful and good to read" by the faithful. It is a common misconception that Martin Luther removed certain books from the Bible; rather, he "collected the apocryphal books and placed them at the end of the Old Testament, rather than have them interspersed among the other books". The Luther Bible influenced the production of Bibles used by the Evangelical-Lutheran Churches worldwide. In the present-day, the official Evangelical-Lutheran Bible translations (such as Bibel 2000) in the Nordic-Baltic region continue to include the Old Testament, Apocrypha, and New Testament, for a total of 77 books in a full Evangelical-Lutheran Bible. To this date, scripture readings from the Apocrypha are included in the lectionaries of the Evangelical-Lutheran Churches and the Anglican Churches.

With respect to English-language Bibles, the British and Foreign Bible Society did include the Apocrypha in Bibles for use in continental Europe, where it was normal for Protestant as well as Catholic readers to have the texts of the Apocrypha. Prior to 1629, all English-language Bibles included the Old Testament, the Apocrypha, and the New Testament; examples include the "Matthew's Bible (1537), the Great Bible (1539), the Geneva Bible (1560), the Bishop's Bible (1568), and the King James Bible (1611)". Robert Haldane criticised this policy.

The Puritan-influenced 'British and Foreign Bible Society' had in fact dropped the Apocrypha from its Bibles published in English in 1804. This decision broke with the tradition of Myles Coverdale, of consolidating the Apocrypha between the two Testaments. They reasoned that by not printing the secondary material of Apocrypha within the Bible, the scriptures would prove to be less costly to produce.

Haldane and William Thorpe began a general campaign in 1821, against all Bibles with the Apocrypha and their printing with funds raised from British sources. The Society was divided over the issue, but the majority view favoured the existing policy of case-by-case inclusion. In Spring 1826 an attempt to reach a compromise with Haldane's view broke down. As a result, the major Scottish branches in Edinburgh and Glasgow left the Society. Most Scottish branches followed, and a few in England.

In the present-day, "English Bibles with the Apocrypha are becoming more popular again", usually being printed as intertestamental books. The Revised Common Lectionary, in use by most mainline Protestants including Methodists and Moravians, lists readings from the Apocrypha in the liturgical calendar, although alternate Old Testament scripture lessons are provided.
