= Luther Bible =

German-language translation of the Bible by Martin Luther

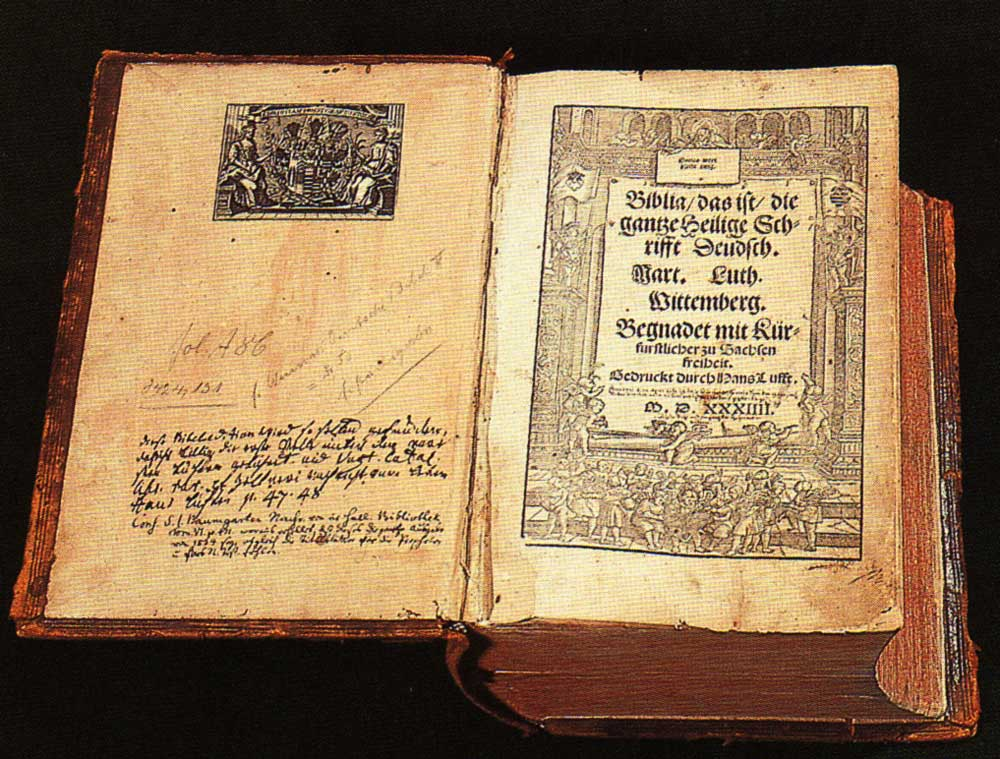
- Martin Luther's 1534 Bible
- Full name: Biblia / das ist / die gantze Heilige Schrifft Deudsch (Biblia / that is / the complete Holy Writing in German)
- Abbreviation: LUT
- OT published: 1534
- NT published: 1522
- Complete Bible published: 1534
- Apocrypha: Deuterocanonical books; Prayer of Manasseh
- Authorship: Martin Luther; Philipp Melanchthon; Caspar Creuziger; Justus Jonas; Johannes Bugenhagen; others
- Textual basis: NT: Textus Receptus (Luther) Vulgate (Bugenhagen); OT: Septuagint (Melanchthon) 2nd Bomberg Edition (Creuziger)
- Version revision: 1984 (last official revision)
- Publisher: Hans Lufft
- Copyright: Public domain due to age
- Religious affiliation: Lutheran churches; Several Reformed churches
- Genesis 1:1–3 Am anfang schuff Gott Himel vnd Erden. Vnd die Erde war wüst und leer / und es war finster auff der Tieffe / Vnd der Geist Gottes schwebet auff dem Wasser. Und Gott sprach / Es werde Liecht / Und es ward Liecht. (1545 revised 5th edition) John 3:16 Also hat Gott die Welt geliebet / das er seinen eingeboren Son gab / Auff das alle die an jn gleuben / nicht verloren werden / sondern das ewige Leben haben. (1545 revised 5th edition)

The Luther Bible (German: Lutherbibel) is a German language Bible translation by the Protestant reformer Martin Luther. A New Testament translation by Luther was first published in September 1522; the completed Bible contained 75 books, including the Old Testament, Apocrypha and New Testament, which was printed in 1534. Luther continued to make improvements to the text until 1545. It was one of the first full translations of the Bible into German that used not only the Latin Vulgate but the original Hebrew and Greek.

Luther did not translate the entire Bible on his own; he relied on a team of translators and helpers that included Philip Melanchthon, a scholar of Koine Greek who motivated and assisted Luther's New Testament translation from Greek, and Matthäus Aurogallus, a linguist and scholar of Hebrew. One of the textual bases of the New Testament translation was the bilingual Latin and Greek version, with its philological annotations, recently published by the Dutch Catholic humanist Erasmus of Rotterdam and called the Novum Testamentum omne (1519).

The project absorbed Luther's later years. The publication of Luther's Bible was a decisive moment in the spread of literacy in early modern Germany, promoting the development of non-local forms of language and exposing all speakers to forms of German from outside their own areas. Thanks to the then recently invented printing press, the result was widely disseminated and contributed significantly to the development of today's modern High German language.

It is a common misconception that Martin Luther removed certain books from the Bible; rather, "Luther collected the apocryphal books and placed them at the end of the Old Testament, rather than have them interspersed among the other books." The Luther Bible influenced the production of Bibles used by the Evangelical-Lutheran Churches worldwide. In the present-day, the official Evangelical-Lutheran Bible translations (such as Bibel 2000) in the Nordic-Baltic region continue to include the Old Testament, Apocrypha, and New Testament, for a total of 77 books in a full Evangelical-Lutheran Bible.

== Previous German translations ==
The Luther Bible was not the first translation or printing of the Bible into German. A number of Bible translations into German, both manuscript and printed, were produced prior to Luther's birth. Historian Margaret O'Rourke Boyle has claimed: "there was no causation between the Lutheran Reformation and the popular reading of Scripture."

- There are still approximately 1,000 manuscripts or manuscript fragments of Medieval German Bible translations extant, mainly from the thirteenth and fourteenth centuries.
- In total, there were at least eighteen complete printed German Bible editions (fourteen in Upper German and four in Low German), ninety editions in the vernacular of the Gospels and the readings of the Sundays and Holy Days, and some fourteen German Psalters by the time Luther first published his own New Testament translation.

=== Translation approaches ===
These previous translations were coupled to the Latin Vulgate and typically word-for-word or literal translations that were not idiomatic in any German dialect, nor necessarily intended to be. One previous word-for-word translation from 1350, printed by Johann Mentelin in 1466, has been called linguistically clumsy and partially incomprehensible.

Luther adopted more of a free phrase-by-phrase or dynamic equivalence translation approach and made key use of some of Erasmus' Greek and philological annotations in his Novum Testamentum omne, where it fitted his theology of law versus faith. However, at least some of Luther's passages can be explained as translations from the Vulgate.

=== Contemporaneous ===
The Zürich Bible was released in stages from 1525 to 1530, made by Zwingli and Leo Jud. It was a High Alemannic (Swiss German) revision of Luther's New Testament altered in word order and vocabulary, with a new Old Testament: the books of the prophets were derived from the 1527 translation of the Anabaptists Ludwig Haetzer and Hans Denck. The publication of the complete Zwinglibibel pre-dates the complete Lutherbibel by four years.

A Catholic revision of Luther's New Testament was issued in 1526 by Hieronymus Emser, and in 1534 Johann Dietenberger released a complete Bible based on Emser's New Testament and the Zwingli/Jud Old Testament.

Johannes Bugenhagen published a Middle Low German version of Luther's New Testament in 1534.

== "September Bible" New Testament (1522) ==
While he was sequestered in the Wartburg Castle for ten months (May 4, 1521 – March 3, 1522), Luther prepared a translation of the New Testament from Latin and Greek and previous German into Saxon German. He produced the initial version in eleven weeks.

One of the textual bases of Luther's New Testament translation was Erasmus' second edition (1519) of the Latin New Testament with Greek (later developed into the Textus Receptus) and annotations. After leaving the castle, Luther revised passages obscure to him with the assistance of Greek specialist Phillip Melanchthon. Like Erasmus, Luther had learned some Greek at the Latin schools led by the Brethren of the Common Life (Erasmus in Deventer, the Netherlands; and Luther in Magdeburg, Germany). These lay brothers had added Greek as a new subject to their curriculum in the late 15th century. At that time Greek was seldom taught even at universities.

Known as the "September Bible", this translation included only the New Testament and was printed in September 1522, six months after he had returned to Wittenberg. Luther also published the Bible in the small octavo format.

In the opinion of the 19th-century Protestant theologian and church historian Philip Schaff:

The richest fruit of Luther's leisure in the Wartburg, and the most important and useful work of his whole life, is the translation of the New Testament, by which he brought the teaching and example of Christ and the Apostles to the mind and heart of the Germans in life-like reproduction. It was a republication of the gospel. He made the Bible the people's book in church, school, and house.

Luther's translation was "remarkably free for its time" as Luther's translation goal was to produce idiomatic Saxon German rather than a literal translation. Schaff notes:

He adapted the words to the capacity of the Germans, often at the expense of accuracy.

— § 63. A Critical Estimate of Luther's Version

For example, he translated δίκαιος -forms with gerecht -words to refer to divine righteousness, but with frum -words in contexts which refer to human goodness, with billig for what is fitting or appropriate, and with recht -words when referring to lawful conduct, to create distinctions that reflected his theological view.

Furthermore, historian Euan Cameron has noted the strong theological agenda:

As other Luther scholars have remarked, there was something of a “feedback loop” at work: Luther’s theology was profoundly scriptural, but having discerned certain messages from Scripture, Luther then led with those messages when interpreting the Bible as a whole. The translation, especially with its comments, served as another vehicle for transmitting the core message of justification. Indeed, the September Testament should be seen as an extension of the controversial theological works of the previous three years, rather than as “just” a translation, standing on its own.

== Complete Bible ==
The translation of the entire Bible into German was published in a six-part edition in 1534, a collaborative effort of Luther and many others such as Johannes Bugenhagen, Justus Jonas, Caspar Creuziger, Philip Melanchthon, Matthäus Aurogallus, and Georg Rörer. Luther worked on refining the translation up to his death in 1546; he had worked on the edition that was printed that year.

The Old Testament was translated using a Jewish Masoretic Text of Soncino, the Vulgate of Jerome, the Septuagint, and, later, Latin versions by Santes Pagnino and by Sebastian Münster.

The 1534 edition issued by the Hans Lufft press in Wittenberg included 117 original woodcuts. This reflected the recent trend (since 1522) of including artwork to reinforce the textual message.

According to Biblical historian W. Gordon Campbell, Lufft's printing of the Bible was introduced for sale at the Michaelmas fair in Wittenberg. The work, was printed on 1,824 pages in two volumes with the addition of the Old Testament and the Apocrypha to Luther's 1522 New Testament, and included woodcut illustrations.

=== Editions during Luther's lifetime ===
Revisions were made during and after Luther's lifetime, sometimes with multiple editions in a single year. The 1530 edition is regarded as his most thoroughgoing revision of the New Testament. The successive revisions were less constrained by Latin and Greek.

Luther's Bible was a bestseller in its time. About 200,000 copies in hundreds of reprinted editions appeared before Luther died in 1546. However, the book remained too expensive for most people; an unbound copy of the complete 1534 Bible cost the equivalent of a month's wages for the average laborer. Instead, the Bible was bought by churches, pastors, and schools.

=== Editions after 1546 ===
Even though the translation and revision work on the Luther Bible ended with Martin Luther's death in 1546, this does not mean that the text of the Luther Bible was no longer changed. It was reprinted and distributed in various places. New adaptations were made time and again. Text changes were part of the everyday business for printers and typesetters. Depending on the region, dialectal idiosyncrasies were incorporated and unfamiliar expressions replaced. Due to its fundamental importance for Protestantism, voices were soon raised that wanted to regulate the content of the Luther Bible, but such initiatives were regionally limited. Three regional versions came to prominence.

- In central Germany, the Normalbibel imposed by Augustus, Elector of Saxony, was the standard text for decades from 1581 onwards.
- The Kurfürstenbibel (Elector's Bible), printed in Nuremberg in 1641, was compiled by a committee of the theological faculty in Jena with the aim of producing an exact reprint of the 1545 edition. By this time, however, everyday language had already clearly moved away from Luther's language. For this reason, more and more Bible editions tried to make the text easier to understand by adding glossaries.
- In 1690, a carefully edited version of the text was also published in northern Germany in the form of the Stader Bibel (Stade Bible), after translations of the Luther Bible into Low German had been common in northern Germany until then. Johannes Diecmann, who studied philology in Bremen, had compared numerous editions of the Bible and was thus able to publish the most reliable edition of the Luther Bible to date. The Stader Bibel also formed the textual basis for the first printing of the Canstein Bible Society. This "Canstein Bible" was the most widely used Luther Bible until the end of the 19th century.

Nevertheless, the number of different versions of the text grew. By the end of the 19th century, there were around ten different versions of the Luther Bible, which contained numerous errors, some of which distorted the meaning. In some editions, for example, the "Sintflut" (Genesis flood narrative) became the "Sündflut" (Flood of Sins), "Osterfest" (Easter) was inadvertently reinterpreted as the "Opferfest" (Feast of Sacrifice) and Luther's now incomprehensible expression "freidig" (courageous, bold) became "freudig" (joyful).

=== Official church revisions ===
In 1863, the Deutsche Evangelische Kirchenkonferenz (EKD, German Protestant Church Conference) decided to prepare a revision of the Luther Bible. Linguistic modernisation was avoided. The explicit aim was to produce a standardised text in which obviously incorrect passages were carefully corrected. The editing lasted until 1892, when the edition was confirmed by the EKD and published by the Bible societies.

Shortly after the first revision, the EKD realised that the Luther Bible contained too many archaisms and that the spelling did not conform to the current rules. With the introduction of the Duden in the German Reich, a binding spelling system was taught in schools for the first time. So it was unacceptable that the Luther Bible, of all things, deviated from this. The text was carefully modernised and adopted and the second official church revision was published in 1912.

The Bible societies were of the opinion that the text was still completely outdated and that the Luther Bible could therefore lose its character as a popular book, but the First and Second World Wars hampered editorial work. Partial revisions were made in 1956, 1964, 1970, and 1975. In 1976, "Luther NT", a very modern version of the New Testament, was published, but it met with much opposition, so that the translation had to be revised again. In 1984, the third official church revision of the Luther Bible was then completed and published. This version was adapted to the new German orthography in 1999. Here also some revisions have taken place, e.g., Weib changed to Frau. In 2017, on the 500th anniversary of Reformation Day and the posting of the Ninety-five Theses, the fourth official revision of the Luther Bible was published. This is the translation currently in use. Some of the text that had been toned down in previous revisions has, in this revision, been reverted to Luther's stronger formulations. The Apocrypha were extensively revised. The Septuagint, the old Greek translation of the Old Testament, was used throughout for the translation of the Apocrypha. As a result, the numbering of the verses had to be revised in some cases.

Despite revisions, the Luther Bible remains challenging for non-native speakers learning German. For this purpose, the 2021 BasisBibel (Basic Bible) is recommended; it uses simple, short sentences and basic vocabulary while maintaining a highly precise translation.

== Books of the Luther Bible ==
The complete 1534 edition of the Luther Bible contains a total of 75 books, including 39 books of the Old Testament, 9 books of the Apocrypha, and 27 books of the New Testament:

Old Testament
Genesis
Exodus
Leviticus
Numbers
Deuteronomy
Joshua
Judges
Ruth
Samuel
Kings
Chronicles
Ezra
Nehemiah
Esther
Job
Psalms
Proverbs
Ecclesiastes
Song of Solomon
Isaiah
Jeremiah
Lamentations
Ezekiel
Daniel
Hosea
Joel
Amos
Obadiah
Jonah
Micah
Nahum
Habakkuk
Zephaniah
Haggai
Zechariah
Malachi

Apocrypha
Judith
Wisdom
Tobit
Sirach
Baruch (including the Letter of Jeremiah)
1 Maccabees
2 Maccabees
Additions to Esther
Additions to Daniel

New Testament
Saint Matthew
Saint Mark
Saint Luke
Saint John
Acts of the Apostles
Romans
First Epistle to the Corinthians
Second Epistle to the Corinthians
Epistle to the Galatians
Epistle to the Ephesians
Epistle to the Philippians
Epistle to the Colossians
First Epistle to the Thessalonians
Second Epistle to the Thessalonians
First Epistle to Timothy
Second Epistle to Timothy
Epistle to Titus
Epistle to Philemon
First Epistle of Peter
Second Epistle of Peter
First Epistle of John
Second Epistle of John
Third Epistle of John
Epistle to the Hebrews
Epistle of James
Epistle of Jude
Book of Revelation

== Mistranslations and controversies ==
Luther controversially added the word "alone" (allein in German) to Romans 3:28 so that it read: "So now we hold, that man is justified without the help of the works of the law, alone through faith". The word "alone" does not appear in the Greek texts, but Luther defended his translation by maintaining that the adverb "alone" was required both by idiomatic German and the apostle Paul's intended meaning according to his interpretation, and that sola had been used in Western theological tradition before him.

Many Protestant and Catholic scholars have noted the bias or methodological flaw in Luther's translation, i.e., using idiomacity as a justification for making explicit a proposition that is, at best, implicit in the text, including Anglican apologist Alister McGrath:

Luther insisted that Paul's doctrine of "justification by faith" was definitive for Christianity. And to make sure that there was no understandings about this, he added the word "alone" lest anyone see faith as one among a number of causes of justification-including works. This addition caused a furor. Catholics pointed out that the NT nowhere taught "justification by faith alone"; indeed, the Letter of James explicitly condemned the idea. Luther responded by making the point that his slogan encapsulated neatly the substance of the NT even if it did not use precisely its original words. And as for the letter of James, was it not "an epistle of straw" that ought not to be in the NT anyway? This second argument caused considerable unease within Protestant circles and was not maintained by Luther's successors.

— Alister McGrath

The 2017 version of the Lutherbibel has added footnotes on Romans 1:17, Romans 2:13, Romans 3:21, and Romans 3:28 which note that German idiom does not, in fact, require alone. While the text of the 2017 version retains the disputed word "alone" (So halten wir nun dafür, dass der Mensch gerecht wird ohne des Gesetzes Werke, allein durch den Glauben), the footnote gives a "literal" translation (Wörtlich: »dass der Mensch aus Glauben gerechtfertigt wird, ohne Werke des Gesetzes«) for the second half of the verse.

Another controversial translation in the 1522 New Testament is 1 Timothy 2:4, which translates that God wills that all men "be helped" (German: geholfen werden) rather than the expected "be saved" for Greek: σωθῆναι.

Karl-Heinz Göttert, a professor of Medieval Studies at the University of Cologne, in reference to his book Luther's Bible - History of a Hostile Takeover noted:

Luther developed a certain theology and now he wants to prove this theology. He wants to show it... You can call that awesome and you can call it wrong. In any case, it does not offer a philologically clean translation of the Bible.

— Karl-Heinz Gottert

An example of this is Gal 5:6, where the usual translation "For in Christ Jesus neither circumcision availeth any thing nor uncircumcision: but faith that worketh by love" is inverted to "love that works by faith": German: "Denn ynn Christo Jhesu gilt widder beschneydung noch vorhaut etwas, ßondern die liebe, die durch den glawben thettig (tätig) ist."

Luther also added German legal terminology which is not found in the original text, for example Denkzettel in Matthew 23:5. There were translations, such as in Psalms 104, 18 where he translated conies (German: Klippschliefer or Klippdachs, the latter used in modern German Bible translations) as rabbits (German: Kaninchen), because there were no conies/hyraxes in Germany and no word for it at the time.

== View of canonicity ==
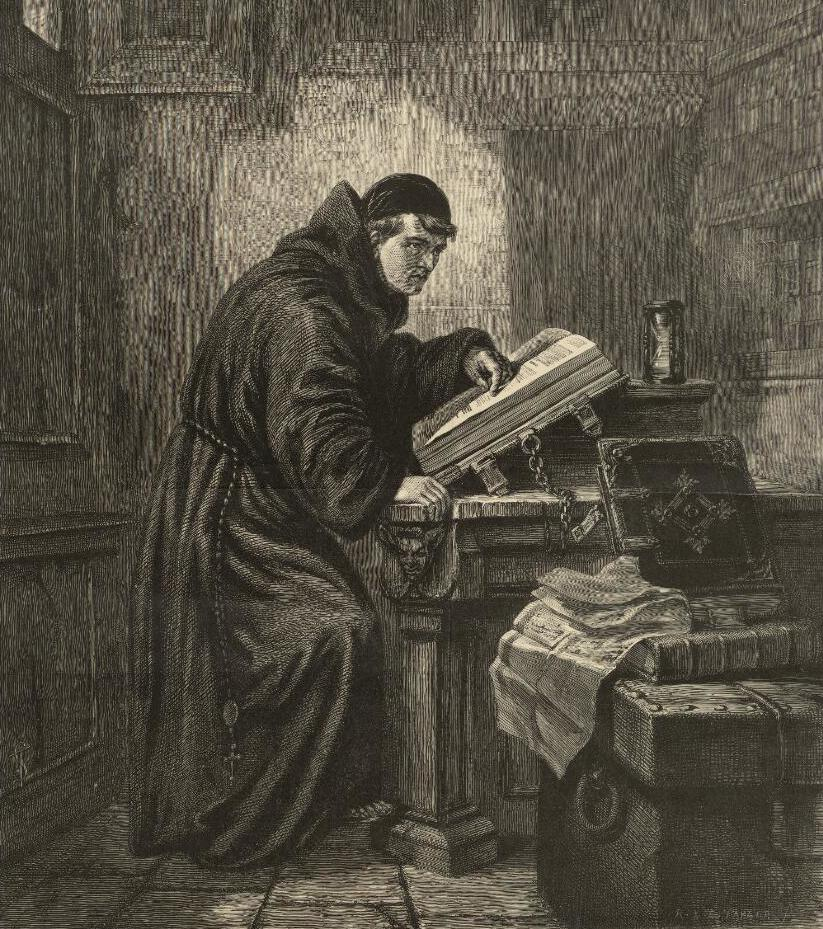
Luther's first study of the Bible

Initially Luther had a low view of the Old Testament book of Esther and of the New Testament books of Hebrews, James, Jude, and the Revelation of John. He called the Letter of James "an epistle of straw", finding little in it that pointed to Christ and his saving work. He also had harsh words for the Revelation of John, saying that he could "in no way detect that the Holy Spirit produced it". In his translation of the New Testament, Luther moved Hebrews and James out of the usual order, to join Jude and the Revelation at the end, and differentiated these from the other books which he considered "the true and certain chief books of the New Testament. The four which follow have from ancient times had a different reputation." His views on some of these books changed in later years, and became more positive.

Luther chose to place the books he considered Biblical apocrypha between the Old and New Testaments. These books and addenda to Biblical canon of the Old Testament are found in the ancient Greek Septuagint but not in the Hebrew Masoretic Text. Luther left the translating of them largely to Philipp Melanchthon and Justus Jonas. Though included, they were not numbered in the table of contents of his 1532 Old Testament, and in the 1534 Bible they were given the well-known title: "Apocrypha: These Books Are Not Held Equal to the Scriptures, but Are Useful and Good to Read". See also Development of the Christian Biblical canon.

== Influence ==
A large part of Luther's significance was in his influence on the emergence of the German language and national identity. This stemmed predominantly from his translation of the Bible into the vernacular, which was potentially as revolutionary as canon law and the burning of the papal bull.

Apart from being used in the Evangelical-Lutheran Churches, those Pennsylvania German-speaking Christians of the Anabaptist traditions continue to use the Luther Bible in the present-day.

=== Publishing success ===
Luther adopted the officially-promoted bureaucratic dialect Saxon Chancery. (Note: "My language is based on that of the Saxon Chancery, which is followed by all the princes and kings in Germany." (Ich rede nach der sächsischen Canzley, welcher nachfolgen alle Fürsten und Könige in Deutschland.)" Luther, Martin (1566). Tischreden 1040) Some writers claim his translation was guided by how people spoke (presumably in the Upper Saxon dialect), and that Luther's faithfulness to the language spoken by the common people was to produce a work which they could relate to. This led later German writers such as Goethe and Nietzsche to praise Luther's Bible.

Moreover, because Luther's Bible was printed, it could spread rapidly and could be read by or to all. Hans Lufft, the Bible printer in Wittenberg, printed over 100,000 copies between 1534 and 1574, and these were read by or to millions. Luther's vernacular Bible came to be present in virtually every German-speaking Protestant's home, and increased the Biblical knowledge of the German common masses. Luther even had large-print Bibles made for those who had failing eyesight.

Luther's goal was to equip every German-speaking Christian with the ability to hear the Word of God, and his completing his translation of the Old and New Testaments from Hebrew and Greek into the vernacular by 1534 was one of the most significant acts of the Reformation. Catholic German humanist Johann Cochlaeus complained that

Luther's New Testament was so much multiplied and spread by printers that even tailors and shoemakers, yea, even women and ignorant persons who had accepted this new Lutheran gospel, and could read a little German, studied it with the greatest avidity as the fountain of all truth. Some committed it to memory, and carried it about in their bosom. In a few months such people deemed themselves so learned that they were not ashamed to dispute about faith and the gospel not only with Catholic laymen, but even with priests and monks and doctors of divinity."

=== Emergence of modern German ===
Luther's German Bible and its widespread circulation facilitated the emergence of a standard, modern German language for the German-speaking people throughout the Holy Roman Empire, an empire extending through and beyond present-day Germany. It is also considered a landmark in German literature, with Luther's vernacular style often praised by modern German sources for the forceful vigor ("kraftvolles Deutsch") with which he translated the Holy Scripture.

The spread of Luther's Bible translation had implications for the German language. The German language had developed into so many dialects that German speakers from different regions could barely understand each other. This led Luther to conclude that "I have so far read no book or letter in which the German language is properly handled. Nobody seems to care sufficiently for it; and every preacher thinks he has a right to change it at pleasure and to invent new terms." Scholars preferred to write in the Latin which they all understood.

Luther's Bible translation, based primarily on Saxon Chancery language used in royal courts and his native Upper Saxon dialect and enriched with the vocabulary of German poets and chroniclers, was a step on the path to a standardized German language, as Early New High German developed into modern "neuhochdeutsch." A contemporary of Luther's, Erasmus Alberus, labeled him the German Cicero, as he reformed not only religion but the German language also.

Luther's Bible has been hailed as the first German "classic", comparable to the English King James Version of the Bible. German-speaking Protestant writers and poets such as Klopstock, Herder, and Lessing owe stylistic qualities to Luther's vernacular Bible. Luther adapted words to the capacity of the German public and through the pervasiveness of his German Bible, created and spread the modern German language.

=== National identity ===
Luther's vernacular Bible also had a role in the creation of a German national identity based on language. Because it penetrated every German-speaking Protestant home, the language of his translation became part of a German national heritage. Luther's program of exposure to the words of the Bible was extended into every sphere of daily life and work, illuminating moral considerations for Germans. It gradually became infused into the culture of the whole nation and has occupied a permanent space in German history.

According to some hagiographers, the popularity and influence of his translation gave Luther confidence to act as a spokesperson of a nation and as the leader of an anti-Roman movement throughout Germany. It made it possible for him to be a prophet of a new German national identity and helped form the spirit of a new epoch in German history. The existence of the vernacular Bible was a public affirmation of empowerment and reform, such as might deprive any elite or priestly class of exclusive control over words, as well as over the word of God.

Through the translation, Luther was intending to make it easier for "simple people" to understand what he was teaching. In some major controversies of the time, even some evangelicals, let alone the commoners, did not understand the reasons for disagreement; and Luther wanted to help those who were confused to see that the disagreement between him and the Roman Catholic Church was real and had significance. So the translation of the Bible would allow the common people to become aware of the issues at hand and develop an informed opinion.

Luther's vernacular Bible broke the domination and unity of the Roman Catholic Church in Western Europe. He had claimed Holy Scripture to be the sole authority, and through his translation every individual would be able to abide by its authority, and might nullify his or her need for a monarchical pope. As Bishop John Fisher put it, Luther's Bible had "stirred a mighty storm and tempest in the church".

=== Literacy and order ===
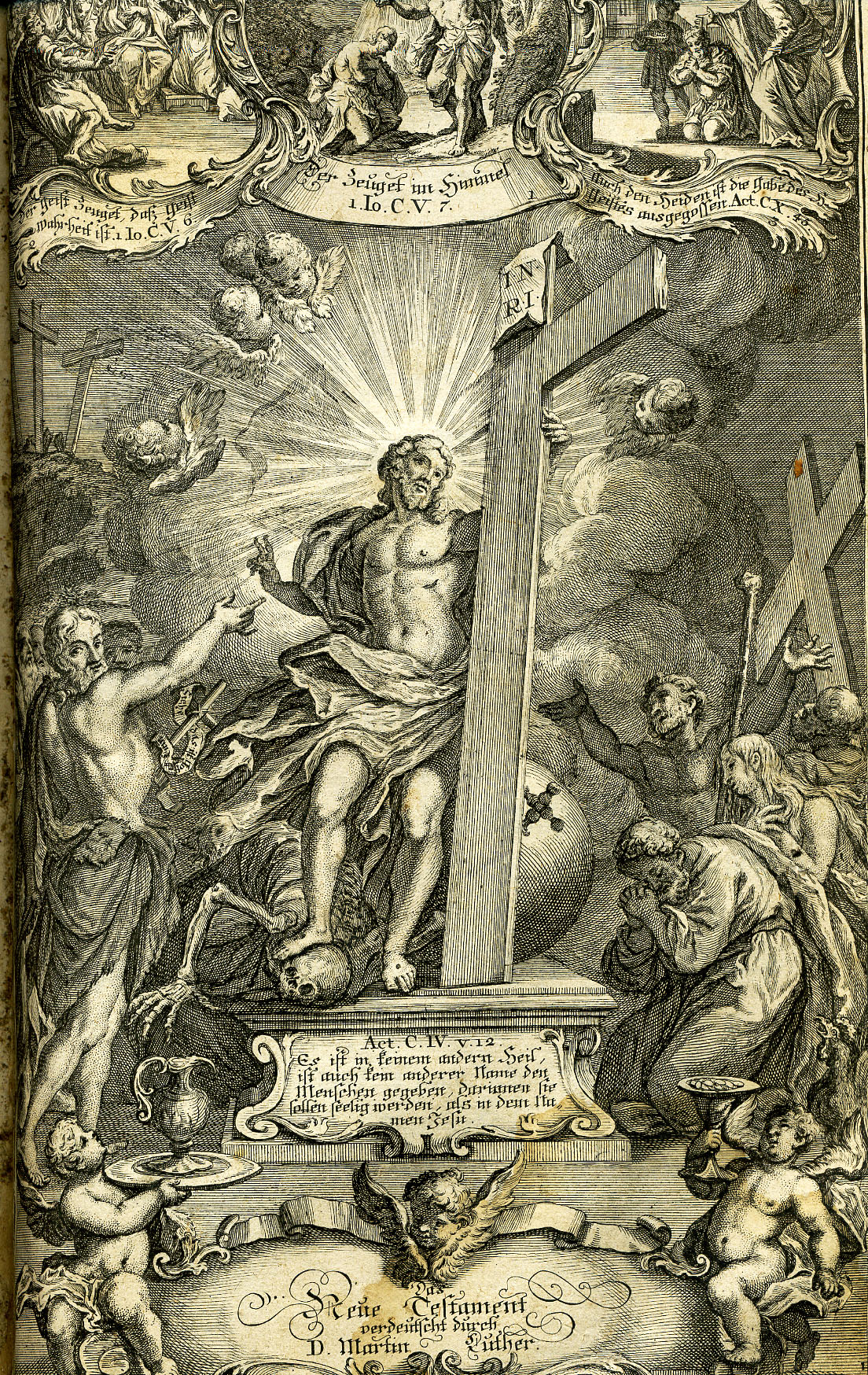
New Testament title-page from a Luther Bible printed in 1769

Although not as significantly as on German linguistics, Luther's Bible also made a large impression on educational reform throughout Germany. Luther's goal of an idiomatic, readable, theologically-accurate translation of the Bible became a stimulus towards universal education, since everyone should be able to read in order to understand the Bible. At the time, only 5% of Germans had good literacy, 30% in the cities, though estimates vary from 1% to 17%. Luther followed Erasmus, who followed Thomas More, on the benefits of educating girls.

Luther believed that mankind had fallen from grace and was ruled by selfishness, but had not lost moral consciousness: all were sinners and needed to be educated. Thus his vernacular Bible could become a means of establishing a form of law, order, and morality which everyone could abide by, if all could read and understand it. The possibility of understanding the vernacular Bible allowed Luther to found a State Church and educate his followers into a law-abiding community. The Protestant states of Germany became educational states, which encouraged the spirit of teaching which was ultimately fueled by Luther's vernacular Bible.

=== Used as basis of other translations ===
Finally, Luther's translated Bible also had international significance in the spread of Protestantism, and far surpassed the expectations of even Luther.

Luther's translation influenced the English translations by William Tyndale and Myles Coverdale, who in turn inspired many other translations of the Bible such as the Bishops' Bible of 1568, the Douay–Rheims Bible of 1582–1609, and the King James Version of 1611. It was the basis of translations in Scandinavia (Gustav Vasa Bible, 1540–1541), Denmark/Norway (Bibles of Christian II and III, 1524–1550), Finland (Se Wsi Testamenti, 1548), and the Netherlands (Liesveltbijbel 1526, Vorstermanbijbel 1528-48, Biestkensbijbel 1560, Deux-Aesbijbel 1562).

== Excerpted examples ==
Verse	Luther Bible	Translation	English versions	Notes
Gen 2:23	"[...] Man wird sie Männin heißen, darum daß sie vom Manne genommen ist."	"One will call her she-man, based on this[:] that she was taken out of the man."	"[...] She shall be called Woman, because she was taken out of Man."	Here Luther tried to preserve the resemblance of Hebrew ish (man) and ishah (woman) by adding the female German suffix -in to the masculine word Mann, because the correct word (at that time), Weib, does not resemble it (as neither does the modern Frau). As with adding she- to man in English, adding -in to Mann in German is considered grammatically awkward.
Matthew 12:34	"[...] Wes das Herz voll ist, des geht der Mund über."	"What the heart is full of, of that the mouth overflows."	"[...] For out of the abundance of the heart the mouth speaks."	Emphasis on conveyance of meaning.
John 11:35	"Und Jesus gingen die Augen über."	"And Jesus' eyes overflowed."	"Jesus wept."	Poetic emphasis.
John 19:5	"[...] Sehet, welch ein Mensch!"	"Behold what a man (this is)!"	"[...] Behold the man!"	Emphasis on Jesus' glory in spite of an ignoble situation; now considered an incorrect translation. See also: Ecce Homo.
Matthew 23:5	"[...] Sie machen ihre Denkzettel breit und die Säume an ihren Kleidern groß."	"They make their slips wide and the hems of their garments large."	"[...] "They make their phylacteries wide and the tassels on their garments long"	Luther used the German legal term Denkzettel in Matthew 23:5 for the translation of the Greek word φυλακτήριον. This Legalistic language does not exist in the Vulgate or any ancient text.

== See also ==
- Bible translations into German
- Elector Bible
- Protestant Bible
- Permanent Exhibition Luther and the Bible at Lutherhaus Eisenach
