= Norwegian Bible Society =

Norwegian Christian foundation

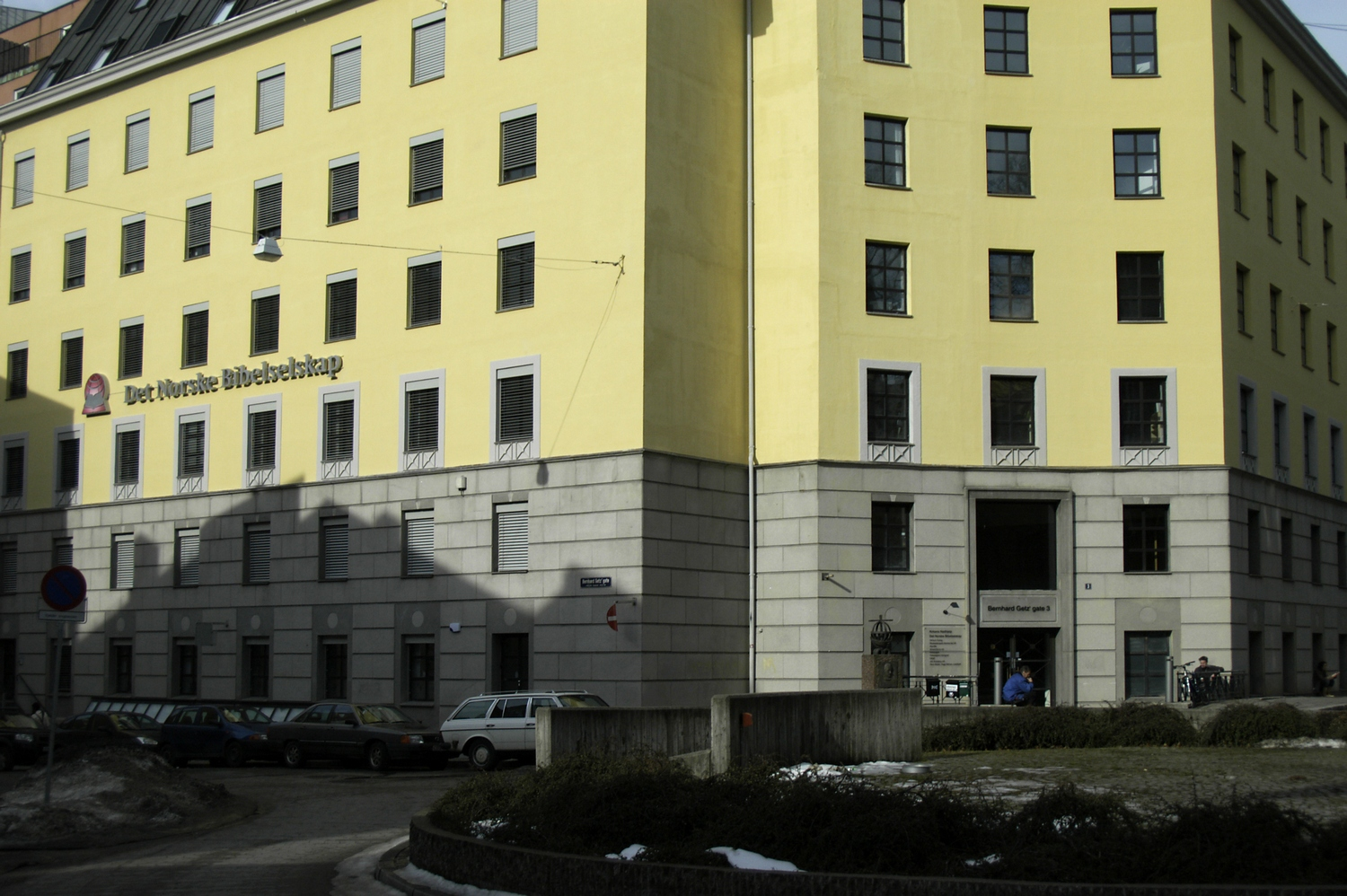
The Norwegian Bible Society's headquarters in Bernhard Getz' gate 3, Oslo

The Norwegian Bible Society (Norwegian: Det Norske Bibelselskap) is a Norwegian Christian foundation which translates, produces, and distributes the Bible in Norway. It is the official Bible society of Norway. The Norwegian Bible Society is organized as a publishing company that distributes the Bible in various editions and other books related to the purpose, as well as a department that finances Bible distribution in other countries. Most of this is done through the United Bible Societies, which operates in over 200 countries and territories and is represented in 145 countries. Most of the denominations in Norway are represented on the board of the foundation.

== History ==
The Norwegian Bible Society was founded on May 26, 1816, and is the oldest interchurch organization in Norway. It was founded as part of a broad international movement that started in England in 1804 and was later established in other countries, including Denmark in 1814. It received support from the Swedish Bible Society, including through the work of Swedish Count Mathias Rosenblad, and the British and Foreign Bible Society. The aim of the movement that arose was to make the Bible available to everyone.

== Translations ==
Initially it primarily focused on publication and distribution of Danish language translations. Only after 1904 were non-Danish translations published. The Bible Society published the first Norwegian language translation of the Bible in 1930. In the 1950s, many considered the language of the 1930 edition to be obsolete, and work began on a complete revision of the Bible. The new translation was published in 1978.

In Nynorsk, the New Testament was published in 1899, and the entire Bible in 1921. A new edition was published in 1938, and in the process of the new translation from the 1950s, work was done in parallel so that a new Nynorsk edition was also published in 1978. It was lightly edited and released in a new edition in 1985.

=== Bibel 2011 ===
Around the turn of the millennium, the society planned a thorough overhaul. Early in this work, a need for a completely new translation from the original language became apparent, and the Norwegian Bible Society involved translators, consultants and advisors in a translation project that would take about eleven years. The new translation of the New Testament (NT) was completed in 2005, and the Society published new two-part editions of the 1985 Old Testament text. In October 2011, the new translation, called Bibel 2011, was published in its entirety, with minor revisions to NT 2005.

The 1930 Bokmål translation, the 1938 Nynorsk translation, and the versions in both target languages with the 78/85 translation will continue to be published, according to the Norwegian Bible Society.

=== Other languages ===
The Norwegian Bible Society has also worked on several translations into Sami, and has been involved in translations and publications of various Sami editions since 1840. The first complete translation of the Bible into Sami came in 1895, translated by Lars Jacobsen Hætta and published by Norsk Finnemisjon. In 1998, The New Testament in Northern Sami was published. In 2003, The New Testament in Lule Sami was published in collaboration between the Norwegian and Swedish Bible Societies.

== Magazine ==
The Norwegian Bible Society publishes Bibelgaven, called Nytt om Bibelen until 2013.

== Staff ==
Magne Lerø served as publishing manager from 1990 to 1992.

== See also ==
- Bible translations in Norway
