= Fredrik Gyllenborg =

Swedish count and politician

Fredrik Gyllenborg (10 December 1767 – 18 August 1829) was Prime Minister for Justice from June 25, 1810 to August 18, 1829.

Preceded by Carl Axel Trolle-Wachtmeister	Prime Minister for Justice; 1810–1829	Succeeded by Mathias Rosenblad
