= Elector Bible =

Lutheran translation of the Bible

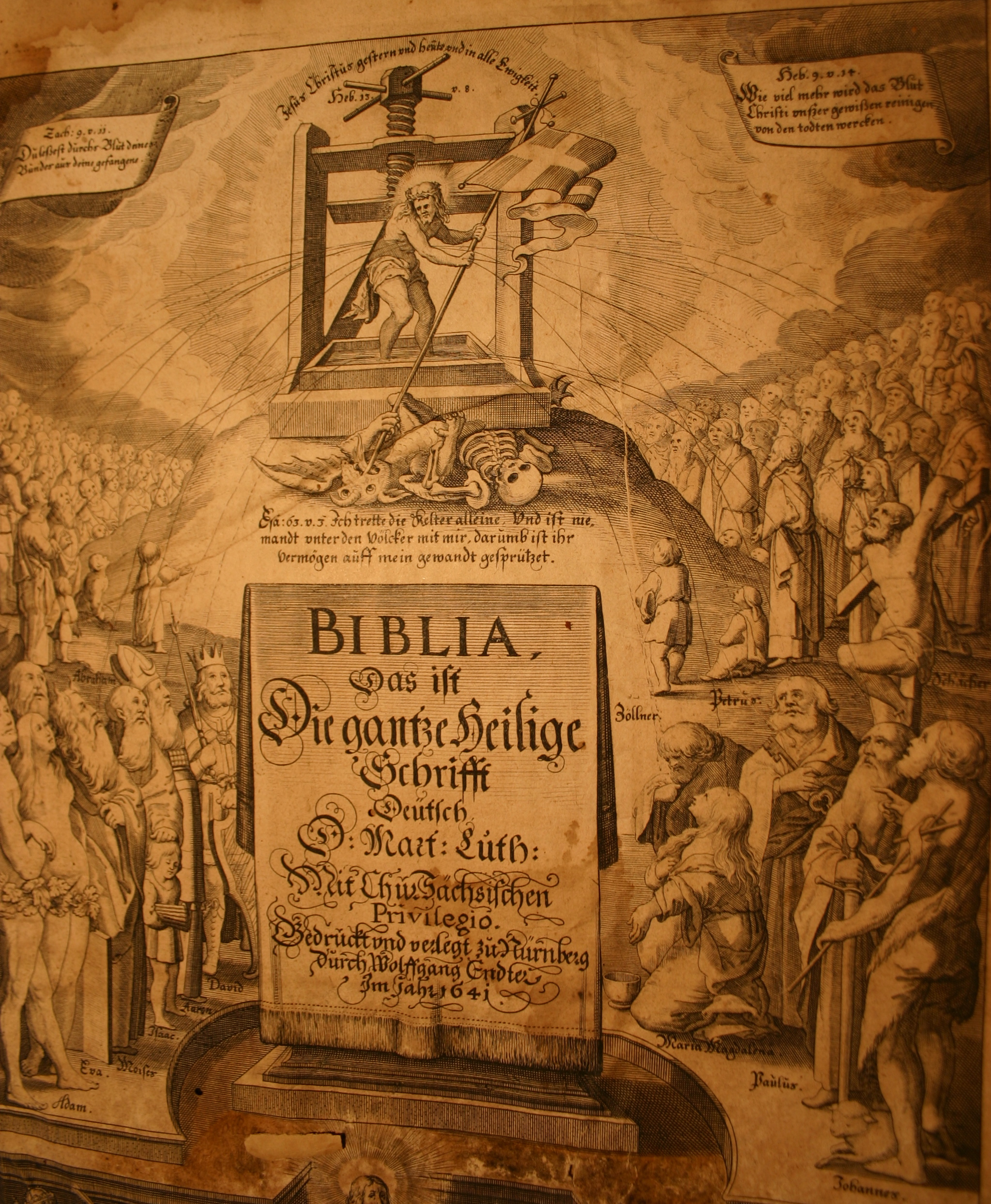
Title page of the Elector Bible (1649). 1758

The Elector Bible (German: Kurfürstenbibel) is a folio-sized Martin Luther translation of the Bible into German, containing both the Old and New Testaments, that was authorized by Ernest I, Duke of Saxe-Gotha and printed by Wolfgang Endter in Nuremberg, Germany from 1641 to 1758. Other names for this Bible are the Weimar Bible (after the city of Weimar) and the Ernestine Bible.

The earliest known edition to have survived to this day is the Detmold edition printed in 1649. There were 14 editions of this Bible.
