= Aue =

Aue may refer to:

- Aue (toponymy), a frequent element in German toponymy meaning "wetland; river island; river"
- Auē, a book by Becky Manawatu

== Places ==
- Aue, Saxony, a mining town in Saxony, Germany
- Aue (Samtgemeinde), a collective municipality in Uelzen District, Lower Saxony, Germany
- Aue, a village in Bad Berleburg, Siegen-Wittgenstein, North Rhine-Westphalia, Germany

== Rivers in Lower Saxony, Germany ==
(each a tributary of the river in brackets)

- Aue (Elbe)
- Aue (Leine)
- Aue (Oste)
- Aue (Suhle)
- Aue (Weser)
- Große Aue

== People ==
- Hartmann von Aue (c. 1160 – c. 1210), medieval German poet of Middle High German literature
- Mary Aue, Nieuan New Zealand STEM advocate, social media specialist
- Paul Aue (1891–1945), World War I aviator and Nazi officer

== Acronyms ==
- A.U.E., a Russian youth criminal subculture
- alt.usage.english, a newsgroup in Usenet
- American University in the Emirates
- Australian English or AuE
- Andrew User Environment, the user interface of the Andrew Project's Andrew User Interface System
- Artists' Union England, trade union in England

== Other uses ==
- Abu Rudeis Airport, IATA code
