= Bibel 2000 =

Swedish translation of the Bible

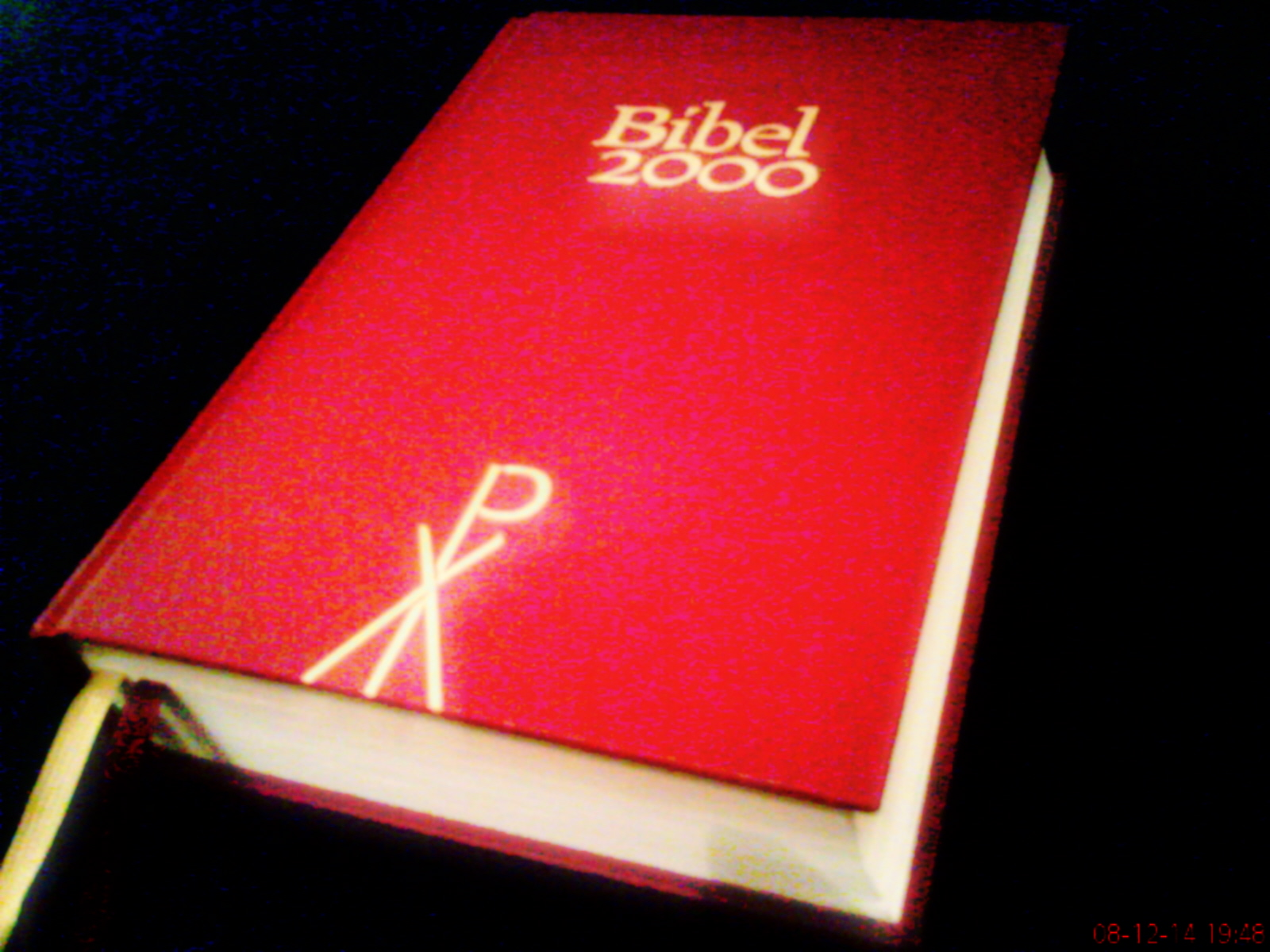
- Front Cover of Bibel 2000
- Abbreviation: B2000
- Complete Bible published: 1999
- Textual basis: OT: Biblia Hebraica Stuttgartensia; Apocrypha: Septuagint (Göttingen); NT: Nestle–Aland Novum Testamentum Graece
- Publisher: Swedish Bible Society (Svenska Bibelsällskapet)
- Religious affiliation: Evangelical-Lutheranism
- Genesis 1:1–3 I begynnelsen skapade Gud himmel och jord. Jorden var öde och tom, och mörker vilade över djupet, och en gudsvind svepte fram över vattnet. Gud sade: ”Ljus, bli till!” Och ljuset blev till. John 3:16 Så älskade Gud världen att han gav den sin ende son, för att de som tror på honom inte skall gå under utan ha evigt liv.

Bibel 2000 is a translation of the Bible into the Swedish language. The Bibel 2000 is the translation of Scripture approved for liturgical and devotional use in the Evangelical-Lutheran Church of Sweden. This full Evangelical-Lutheran translation of the Christian Bible includes a total of 77 books found in the Old Testament, the Apocrypha, and the New Testament. As the Church of Sweden held the status of a state church, Bibel 2000 was prepared through the Bible Commission set up by the Riksdag (Parliament). In addition to its liturgical usage in the Church of Sweden, Bibel 2000 is used ecumenically by other Christian denominations in Sweden, including the Catholic Church in Sweden. Bibel 2000 was published by Advent 1999, the start of the liturgical year. As a scholarly translation, Bibel 2000 contains several footnotes that explicate various verses. Upon publication, Libris bokförlag "printed more than 200,000 copies of the edition, more than ten times the normal print run for a new book."

== History ==
Work on Bibel 2000 began in 1973, though the Evangelical-Lutheran Church of Sweden and the Bible Commission set up by the Riksdag (Parliament). As it was published around the turn of the millennium, it took the name Bibel 2000.

== Books of the Bible 2000 ==
A total of 77 books are found in Bibel 2000, organized in the pattern of the Luther Bible:

Old Testament
Genesis
Exodus
Leviticus
Numbers
Deuteronomy
Joshua
Judges
Ruth
1 Samuel
2 Samuel
1 Kings
2 Kings
1 Chronicles
2 Chronicles
Ezra
Nehemiah
Esther
Job
Psalms
Proverbs
Ecclesiastes
Song of Solomon
Isaiah
Jeremiah
Lamentations
Ezekiel
Daniel
Hosea
Joel
Amos
Obadiah
Jonah
Micah
Nahum
Habakkuk
Zephaniah
Haggai
Zechariah
Malachi

Apocrypha
Tobit
Judith
Greek additions to Esther
1 Maccabees
2 Maccabees
Wisdom of Solomon
Sirach (Ecclesiasticus)
Baruch
Letter of Jeremiah
Additions to Daniel
Prayer of Manasseh

New Testament
Saint Matthew
Saint Mark
Saint Luke
Saint John
Acts of the Apostles
Romans
First Epistle to the Corinthians
Second Epistle to the Corinthians
Epistle to the Galatians
Epistle to the Ephesians
Epistle to the Philippians
Epistle to the Colossians
First Epistle to the Thessalonians
Second Epistle to the Thessalonians
First Epistle to Timothy
Second Epistle to Timothy
Epistle to Titus
Epistle to Philemon
Epistle to the Hebrews
Epistle of James
First Epistle of Peter
Second Epistle of Peter
First Epistle of John
Second Epistle of John
Third Epistle of John
Epistle of Jude
Book of Revelation

== Liturgical use ==
Bibel 2000 is the translation of Scripture used by the Evangelical-Lutheran Church of Sweden, which commissioned its publication. The Catholic Church in Sweden uses readings from Bibel 2000 in its lectionary as well.

== See also ==
- Bible translations into Swedish
- Swedish Bible Society
