= Bible translations in Norway =

Overview of Bible translations into Norwegian

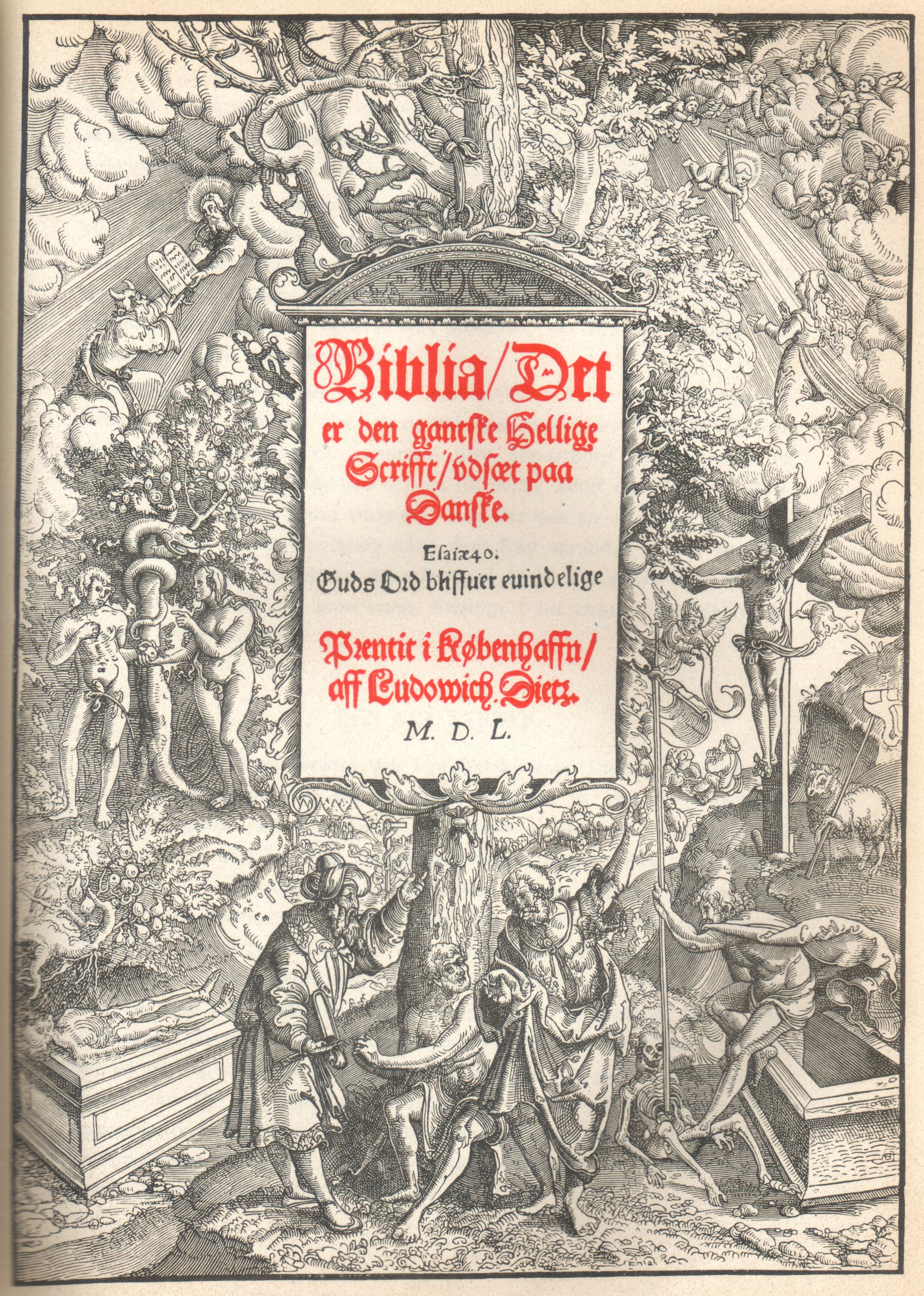
Title page of Christian III's Bible, from 1550

Bible translations in Norway date back to the late 13th century. Since the first spread of Christianity in Norway, numerous translations of the Bible have been published. Translations have appeared in several of the official languages that Norway has had throughout its history, including editions in Old Norse, Danish, and both current standard forms Nynorsk and Bokmål.

== Old Norwegian "Stjórn" ==
At the end of the 13th century, some parts of the Old Testament were translated into Old Norse. This rendering of the text became known as "Stjórn", meaning "Government," because it was most likely done at the court of King Haakon V. It serves as more of a paraphrase of the Bible than as a strict translation.

The text was published in Norway by C. R. Unger in 1862, and the edition influenced later translations of the Bible into Norwegian. Only two manuscripts of the text are known today, neither in Old Norse, but rather having been themselves translated into the Icelandic.

== Danish editions 1524-1873 ==
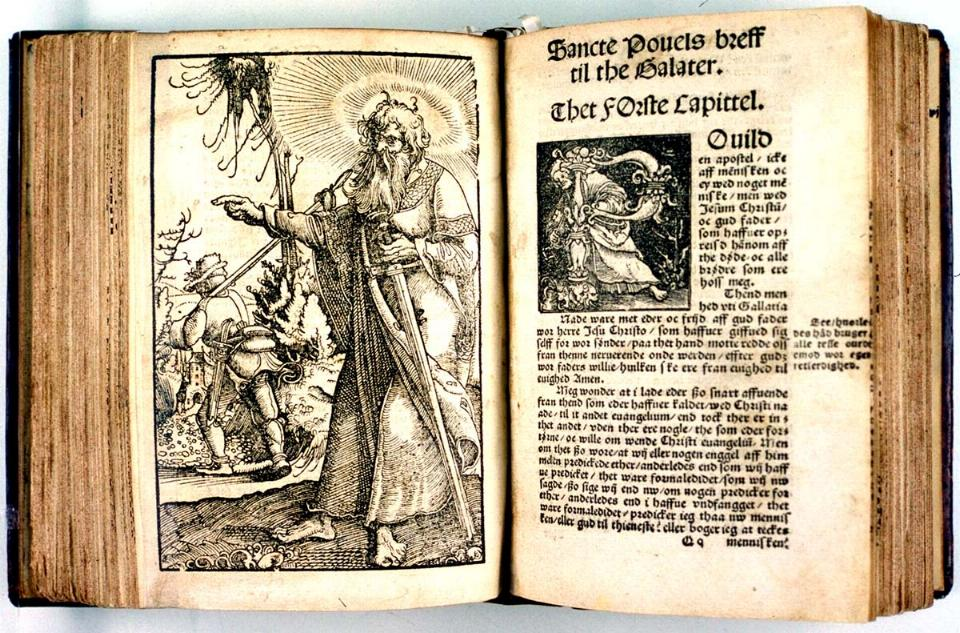
The New Testament of 1524.

In 1524, the exiled King Christian II of Denmark-Norway ordered the publication of the first Danish-language translation of the New Testament. It was given a full title which can be translated as "This is the New Testament in Danish directly from the Latin version," and is often referred to today as the New Testament of King Christian II. The inspiration to publish this translation came from the king's visit to Wittenberg, Germany, a focal point of the Protestant Reformation. The translation work was done by Christiern Winter, Hans Mikkelsen, and Henrik Smith, while Melchior Lotter financed the printing. The translation was based on Erasmus of Rotterdam's Latin Bible translation of 1516 for the Gospels and Acts of the Apostles, and on Martin Luther's German New Testament for the rest.

After publication, the book was subject to harsh criticism. Its Danish was not very fluent, and there was an attack in the preface on King Frederick I (who had previously deposed King Christian II). There was also a petition against the Catholic Church in Denmark, which led to the eventual banning of this translation in Denmark. Only about 40 copies are known to exist today.

Christiern Pedersen's New Testament was a complete translation into Danish, published in Antwerp in 1529. Pedersen used the Vulgate as a starting point, but was also inspired by Luther's German translation of the New Testament. Pedersen was a Reformist Catholic who considered it important for the translation to be in the vernacular; the language used was quite free and accessible, close to everyday vernacular. A revised edition was published in 1531.

=== Christian III's Bible and versions based on this ===
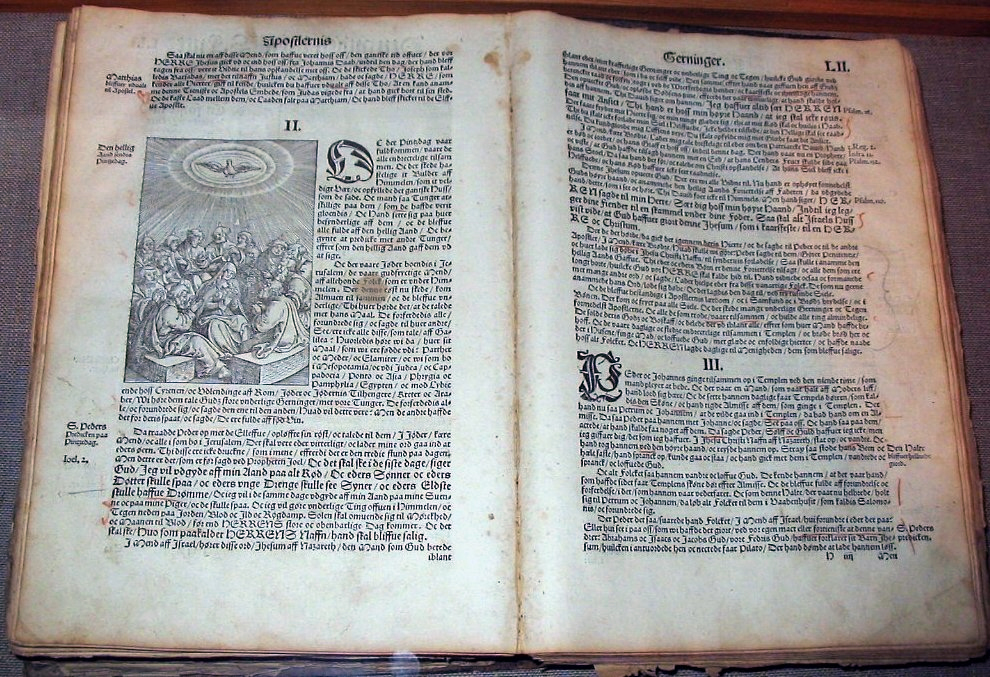
Christian III's Bible posted at Acts Chapter 2 and 3

Christian III's Bible was the first full Danish-language Bible translation, published in 1550. It was commissioned by King Christian III. A commission of theologians compiled this first 1550 edition, largely based on Luther's complete German-language translation of the Bible published five years earlier in 1545. It was also influenced by: Luther's Low German translation of 1534; the Swedish Bible translation named after Gustav Vasa; Pedersen's translations of the New Testament (1529), Psalms (1531) and Genesis (1535); and on two complete, unpublished translations of the Bible, one by Pedersen, and one by Hans Tausen from 1543. A combined emphasis on fluency of the language employed and a translation close to the original texts yielded a result which is considered very good. The Bible was illustrated, and also contained some cross-references. The price of the book was 5 daler, equivalent in price to a good bull or thirty barrels of rye. About 3000 copies were printed, of which 96 came to Norway. The language used in this translation exhibited German influence, but because this book significantly improved access to the Biblical literature for everyday Danes and Norwegians, editions based on this became the dominant Bibles in Denmark and Norway for much of the Reformation era, earning the edition the common name, "The Reformation Bible."

A new edition of the New Testament was published in 1558. This was largely a reprinting of the 1550 edition, but also included Martin Luther's preface to the different texts and expanded the notes.

The Bible of Frederick II was published by King Frederick II in 1589. It was a slightly revised version of the 1550 edition, which contained the revised New Testament translation that was released in 1558, and added Luther's prefaces to the Old Testament, just as they had been added to the New Testament. Luther's chapter summaries and a small Bible dictionary were also included. This edition showed less German language influence than its predecessor, and contained many corrections of translation and typography.

Christian IV's Bible, related to King Christian IV, was published in 1633. It was a revision of the 1589 translation featuring simpler language, done by Hans Poulsen Resen. (See below)

Frederik III's House and Travel-Bible was published in 1670 in a smaller, more convenient format than previous editions. It was based primarily on Luther's 1545 translation, as well as on the Danish translations from 1589 and 1633. The translation was popular, and appeared in several editions, the last in 1802.

=== Resen's Bible and versions based on this ===
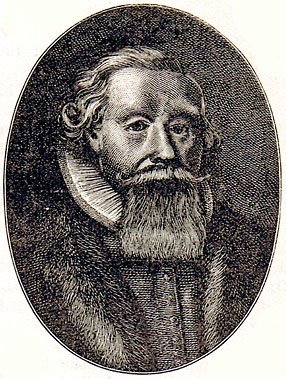
Hans Poulsen Resen

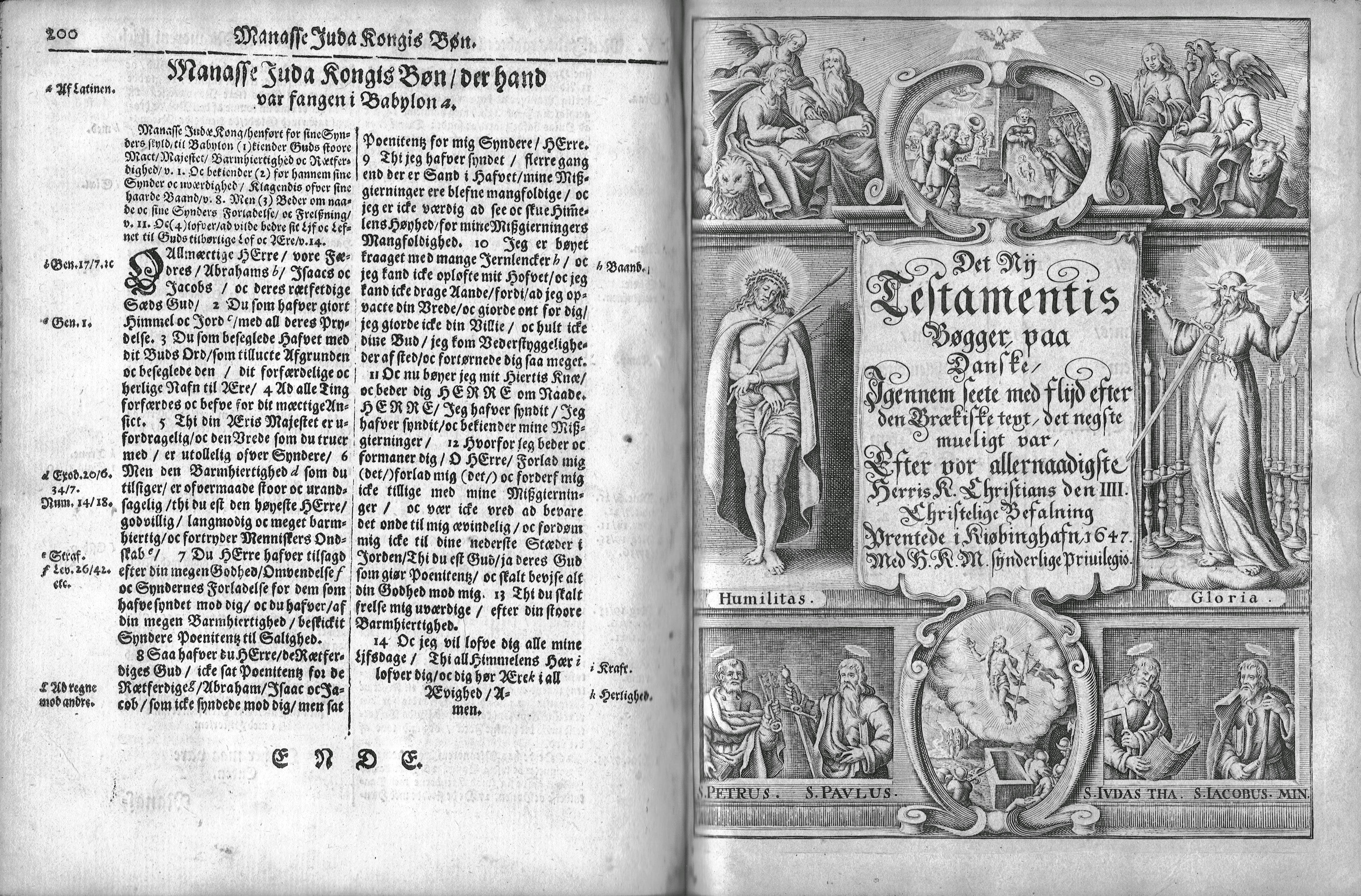
Resen-Svaningske Bible from 1647

A new family of translations, which came to assume a very important position in the Danish-Norwegian biblical tradition, is named after professor of theology Hans Poulsen Resen. Initially, he only meant to revise the translation from 1589, but he eventually went on to translate the Bible wholesale from the original texts. His first translation was published in 1607 and was very accurate, but it was written in an unnatural and difficult language, as he followed the original texts with painstaking accuracy (for example, Resen put Danish words needed for comprehension in parentheses if they were not present in the original text.) This edition was the first Danish-Norwegian translation to include the traditional subdivision into verses. It also contained a lot of explanations of words and interpretations in the margins; altogether, this led to a messy typography.

Resen was mostly interested in the basic text, and the language of the translation has been referred to as "Hebrew-Danish" or "Greek-Danish". The translation received praise in its day for its accuracy, but has been criticized in retrospect for its lack of Danish fluency. Danish translator Tomas Skat Rørdam said of Resen "of all Denmark's renowned men, there has never been anyone who has written such a barbarically struggled Danish as he [did]"

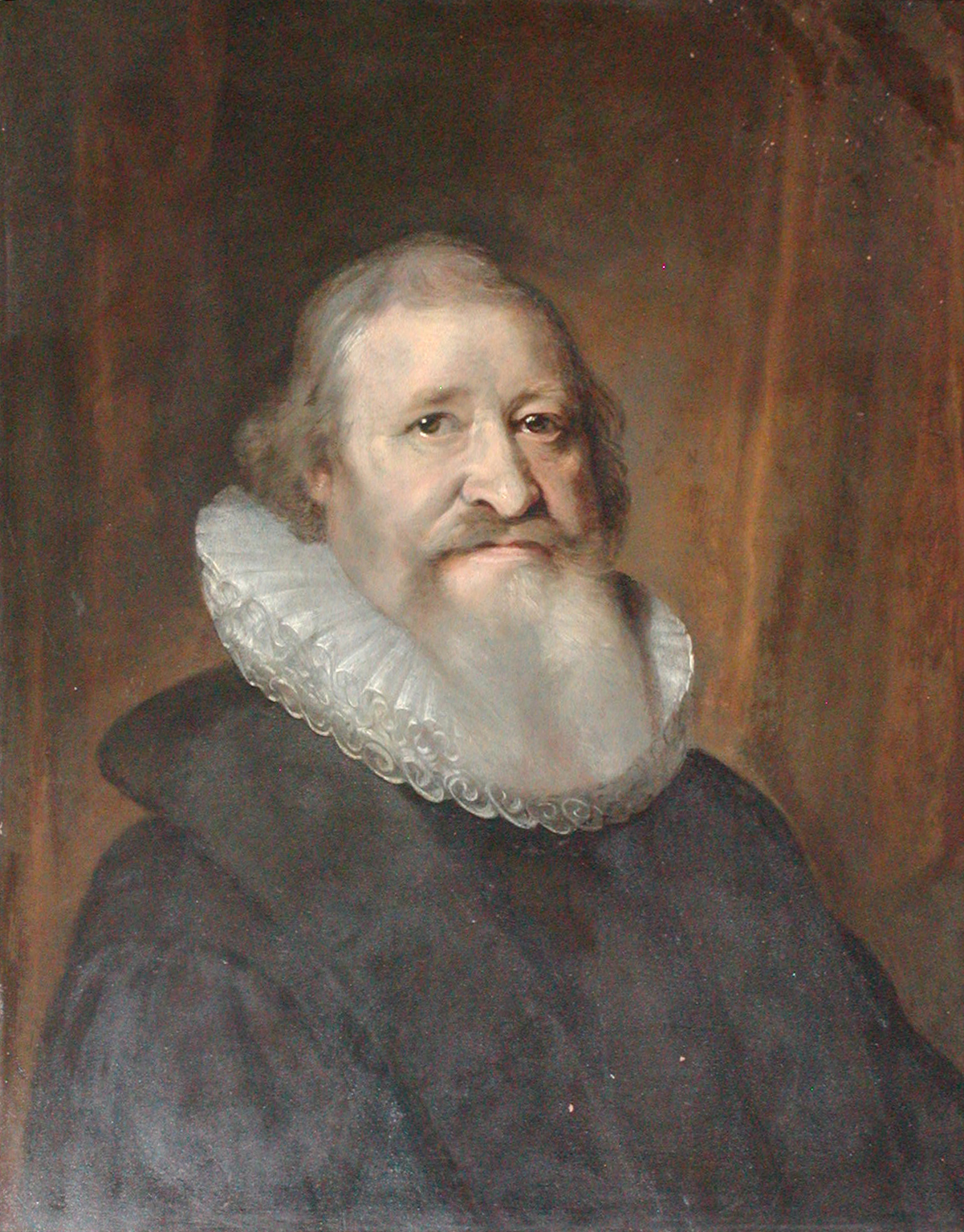
Hans Svane

The Resen-Svaningske Bible was published in 1647 and is a revision of Resen's Bible from 1607. The revision was made by Hans Swan, and has been named after both translators. This translation became the official Church Bible of the Danish-Norwegian church.

The Resen-Svaningske Bible in the revised edition was published in 1740. This version was used as the basis for later printings, and was the dominant translation in Norway until the purely Norwegian translations were made. The Norwegian Bible Society published revised versions of it in 1820 and 1830 and one version of it was edited and published by Olaus Nielsen in 1853.

=== Norwegian Bible Society Bibles in Danish ===
The Norwegian Bible Society was founded in 1816 and saw as its main task the publication of Bibles for the Norwegian market, focusing primarily on revisions of the Danish versions already in existence. In 1820 it released its first volume, a revised edition of the New Testament. This became known as "the revision of 1819," and it was noteworthy for marking in brackets all of the text that was probably not derived from original sources. It also diverges from the Textus Receptus on some points, a choice that was rare at the time. This tradition was continued in an edition published in 1830, where even greater parts of the text were enclosed in brackets, but eventually fell out of favor; in the New Testament edition published in 1848, all traces of textual criticism were removed.

The British and Foreign Bible Society, which at that time also had operations in Norway, published two Bible versions for Norwegian distribution in 1829 and 1834. These differed from the other contemporary Danish and Norwegian Bibles in omitting the Apocrypha. For a long time the British and Foreign Bible Society sold more Bibles in Norway than the Norwegian Bible Society.

The Norwegian Bible of the Norwegian Bible Society was published in 1854, and was the first version of the Bible to be produced in Norway. The New Testament was based on a version of "the Resen-Svaningske", published in 1830, while the Old Testament is based on a Danish version of the "Resen-Svaningske" from 1740. The British and Foreign Bible Society had published an edition similar to the Norwegian Bible Society one. Despite its name, it was in the Danish language, and was very popular in Denmark until a new Danish revision was made in 1871.

The revision of Skaar was a New Testament version published in 1873. The work was revised by the priest Johannes Nilssøn Skaar. This version is known for a strongly Norwegianized language, taking it in a more idiomatic direction and focusing on the importance of the meaning of the original rather than the words themselves.

=== Other versions ===
The Picture-Bible of the Norwegian People, Containing the Canonical Books of the Holy Scripture was published privately in Christiania in 1840. This Bible was illustrated with 100 photographs, and was mainly based on the Reformation Bible (Christian III's Bible).

== Norwegian editions 1873-2011 ==
The first part of the Bible to be published in Norwegian was Apocrypha. These books "fell out" of canon during the Reformation, but are still held high by most Protestant churches. (In the Catholic Church the books are considered fully canon.) The Norwegian language translation of the Apocrypha appeared in 1873, and was a test translation, a revision of a translation from the 1850s that was never published. A new revision was released by the Society in 1887. In 1891 a translation was published of the Old Testament with the Apocrypha, the first official Norwegian-language version of these books from the Bible Society. A revision was then published in 1940, before the next translation was in 1988. In 1994 the Bible Society published a new edition with both the apocryphal and the canonical writings in Norwegian.

=== Landsmål/Nynorsk ===
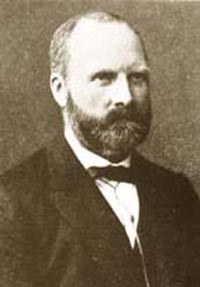
Elias Blix - a pioneer in the Bible work in New Norwegian (Nynorsk).

The first Norwegian biblical text in Nynorsk was Ivar Aasen's translation of the story of the prodigal son, in 1859. By the 1880s, a group of translators had started work on The New Testament in the National Idiom. These first translators were not associated with the linguistically conservative Bible Society, but rather with publishing house the Norwegian Samlaget, which published the first editions of the Bible in a Norwegian written language. Their work was aided by state funding. Beyond the 1880s, they released several books of writings from the New Testament. The first of these was the book of Romans, published in 1882. By 1889 the whole New Testament had been made ready for release. Everything was translated from Greek, and it was titled The New Testament. Translated from the Greek text in Norwegian vernacular and Published by the Prime Cost of the Norwegian Samlaget. This was the first Norwegian translation of the New Testament in any form of Norwegian, and it did not come out before in 1904. Pioneers in this work were minister and professor Elias Blix, text scientist John Belsheim and school man Matias Skard. In addition, Ivar Aasen, FWK Bugge and C.R. Unger formed an advisory committee that aided the project. The translation was based on the Textus Receptus. The language of the translation was characterized by the Danish syntax, with Norwegianization increasingly applied to words rather than sentence structure. The language was also influenced by Old Norse and the Old Norse Stjórn Bible.

The Landsmål/Nynorsk dialect of Norwegian became legally equivalent to Riksmål in 1892. The Bible Society published its own audit of the New Testament in the 1899, mainly audited by Elias Blix. He then went on to work on translating the Psalms into Nynorsk, which he did until he died in 1902. The work was then taken over by Peter Hognestad. Hognestad translated also Proverbs and Ecclesiastes in its entirety to the Norwegian, in addition to many smaller pieces of text.

In 1904, an edition of Psalms was published, titled Psalms. Translated from Hebrew. Psalms 1-51 was translated by Blix and psalms 52-150 by Hognestad. The following year there was an edition that contained both the Psalms and the New Testament, before the Illustrated New Testament was published in 1908.

Alexander Seippel, who had initiated work on the first complete translation of the Bible into Norwegian, began to translate the Old Testament. Seippel used a vibrant and popular language, and said that the language would be "above all down-to-earth... I would never write a sentence unless I knew that a Norwegian farmer could say it." (Rough translation)

As Seippel's work progressed, the biblical books were published in booklet form, first by the Samlaget, then from 1915 onward by Bible Society. The Pentateuch was published from 1905 to 1912, followed by the other biblical books. Seippel has a reputation as a very good translator; Aage Holter says that "Alexander Seippel took Norwegian Bible translation to the greatest heights ever achieved"

The Preliminary Bible, as the first complete Bible translation in Nynorsk, was published in 1921. It was published by the Students Language Association (Studentmållaget), a club that promote the use of Nynorsk. The translation is therefore also called "Studentmållagsbibelen", often abbreviated SMB-1921. Several translators contributed, with Seippel and Hognestad doing most of the translation work, and Gustav Indrebø responsible for legal writing.

Seippel continued efforts to translate Biblical writings into Norwegian. This was necessary, as several writings in the Bible of 1921 were not translated from original sources, but from the other Nordic languages. More individual books of the Bible were published using Seippel's translations, and these were in turn used during the work on the 1978 translation.

The Indrebø translation was published in 1938, the first full Norwegian-Language Bible published by the Norwegian Bible Society. The translation is often abbreviated NO38. It was largely a revision of the 1921 Preliminary Bible, but with much of Seippel's idiomatic language toned down in order to harmonize better with the Bible Society's own Norwegian translation published in 1930. The translation has been nicknamed "Indrebø Bible" or "Indrebø translation" because of two brothers who both played a central role in the work, Ragnvald Indrebø, who later became a bishop in Bjorgvin Diocese, and Gustav Indrebø, a Professor of Norwegian.

=== Bokmål ===
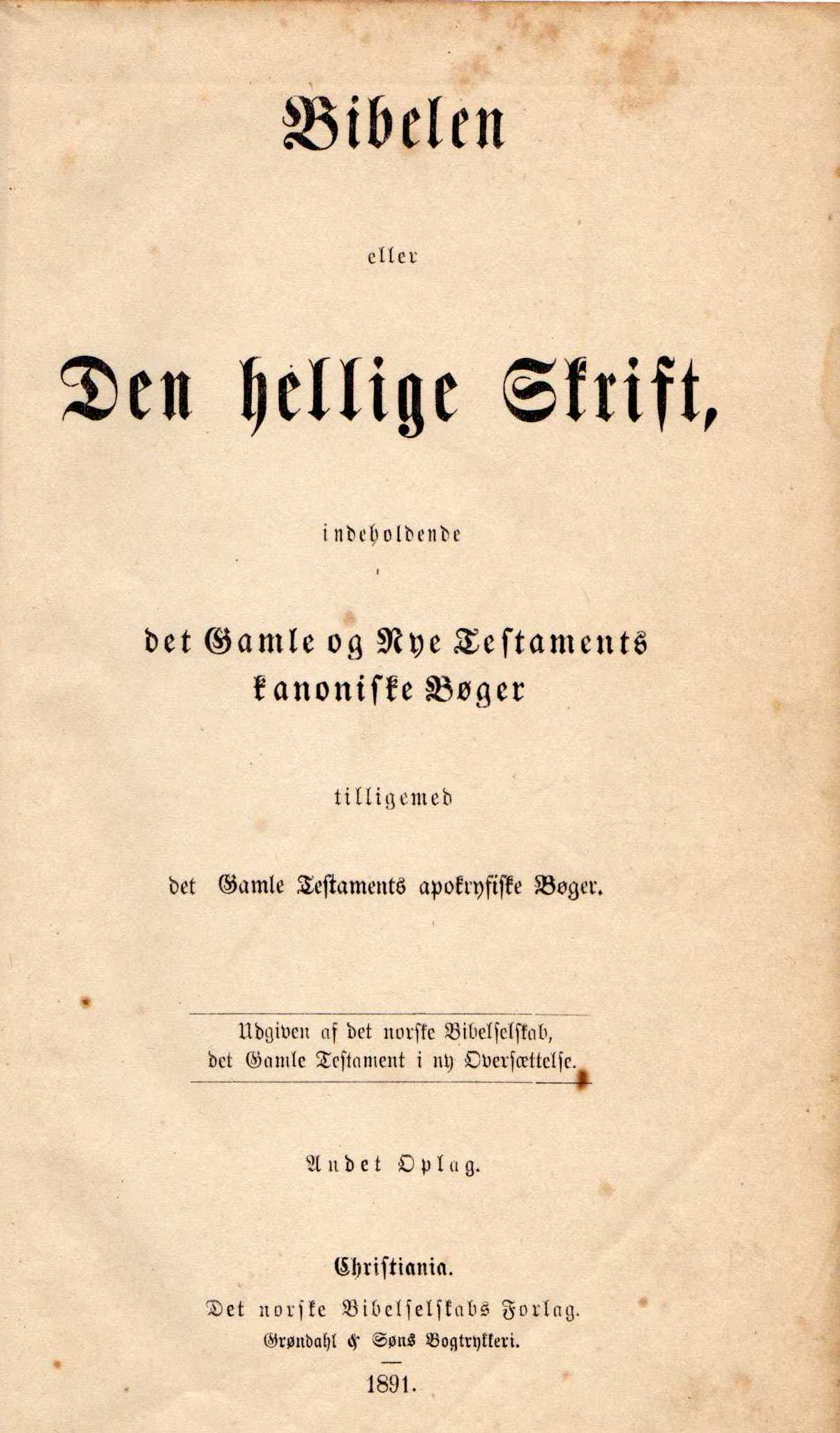
Title Speaking Bible Society edition of 1891.

In 1891 the first full translation of the Old Testament to Bokmål was made directly from the basic languages. This included translation of the Apocrypha, which once published with the Old Testament formed the Bible Society's first official version of these texts. The work of translation was done by Wilhelm Andreas Wexels and Jens Matthias Pram Kaurin. Wexels had previously been behind a British-organized revision published in 1834. These two translators initially estimated that the work would take five years; the project ended up lasting for around fifty. They delivered a draft of the individual books to an audit committee, which then in turn considered the translation. The committee consisted mostly of teachers from the Faculty of Theology, led by Carl Paul Caspari. He contributed to the chapter summaries before each chapter. As the different parts were approved, they came out in the booklets. In 1869 the Old Testament was published as a sample translation. The final version came in 1891, with "the issue" in 1888.

The translation was met with skepticism, both from those who felt that it was bad language in the translation, such as Bishop Anton Christian Bang, and from the Faculty of Theology, which were critical of the choice of base texts for the translation.

In parallel with this work, a second translation of The New Testament was being prepared. This was given in 1870 to a professor of New Testament studies, Jacob Frederick Dietrichson, who died in 1879. He submitted a proposal, and his successor, Frederick William Bugge, was given the task of completing this translation in 1886. Bugge, a champion of the Norwegian language, had to both look over Dietrichson's work and translate the rest. While Dietrichson had strictly followed the Textus Receptus, Bugge chose older texts. When Bugge became Bishop of Oslo in 1893, his translation work was handed over to Sigurd Odland, who, like Dietrichson, remained closer to the Textus Receptus The last ten years of work was carried out by an audit committee consisting of the theological professors Anton Christian Bang, Sigurd Odland, and Elias Blix, as well as linguist Johan Storm.

Thus 1904 saw the publishing of the first official New Testament to have been translated into Bokmål from the basic text. The translation is close to Textus Receptus and there are attempts to render a word in the basic text with the same Norwegian word every time it occurs. In spite of this somewhat strange translation principle, the translation comes across as relatively fluent in the Norwegian language.

The Bible Society's 1930-translation (NO30) was a copy of the full Bible, revising the New Testament translation from 1904 and revising even more strongly the Old Testament translation from 1891. In this edition, the language was further Norwegianized, giving the two Testaments a more unified Norwegian expression. The audit process was led by Bang and Odland, with help from Alexander Seippel, who had worked hard to translate the Bible into Norwegian. The translation follows the orthographic norms of 1917, and stood as the common standard for over 40 years. Despite this opinion by 1939 Eivind Berggrav, bishop of the Diocese of Oslo, felt that the language was not good enough and that it should work with a new translation.

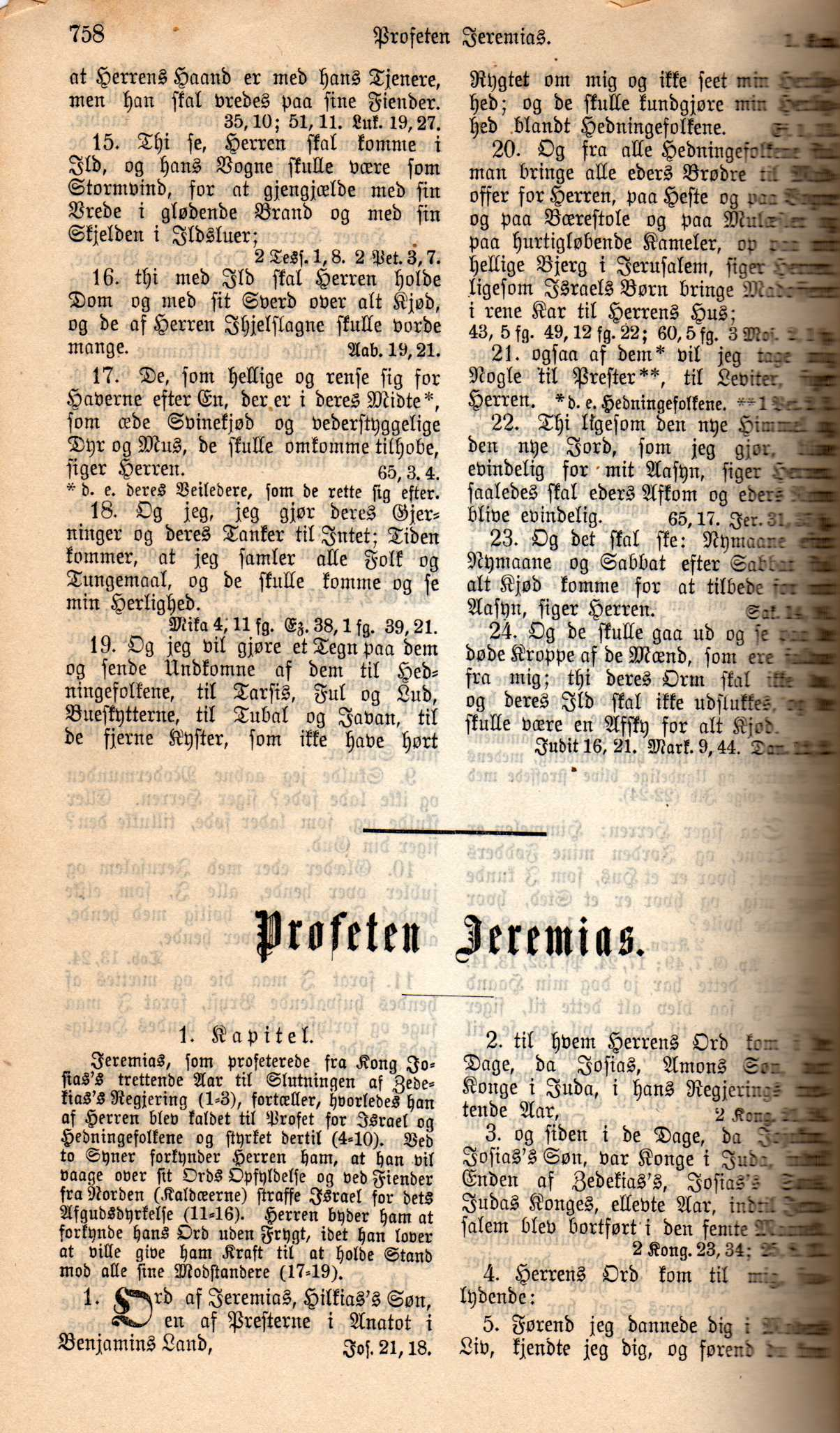
A page from the Bible Society edition of 1891. The picture shows the start of Jeremiah, with chapter summaries.

There have also been translations of the Bible in Bokmål published by people other than the Bible Society. The motivation for, and the results of, these versions have varied; several important ones include:

The "GTMMM", or S. Michl, Sigmund Mowinckel and N. Messel scholarly edition of the Old Testament in five volumes came out from 1929 to 1963. The name "GTMMM" was given by its authors. This is a scholarly edition with text-critical notes and comments, often with textual criticisms not found in the "people issues". This edition follows an idiomatic translation principle, and was important in the work of the 1978 translation.

John Brown Sounds, Professor of New Testament studies, published The New Testament in a new translation. The text has never been used by many, including during the work on the 1978 translation.

From the Catholic communities in Norway, there have been three translations of the New Testament in Norwegian. In 1902 the New Testament was translated from the Latin Vulgate by the priest and later bishop Olaf Offer Dahl. This translation was then revised and came in a new edition of 1938. The full name of this translation was The New Testament canonical books sold after the Vulgate and provided with explanation. This translation included explanations of the ways its Vulgate-based text differed from other Greek-based New Testament texts.

Gunnes' New Testament was in 1968 published by the priest Erik Gunnes. Gunnes had translated the entire New Testament itself, and the translation was approved for use in the Catholic Church. The translation came out in paperback edition in 1969. Gunnes was more academic and conservative in wording than youth translation that had come out earlier. Gunnes' translation was "carefully studied the work of GB 1978-1985"

The so-called Acta-translation of the New Testament was published in 1973, with the goal of publish the New Testament in modern Norwegian. The movement in support of this translation included people with links to Linde publishing and to Gideon's efforts to distribute Bibles in hotels. Individuals who supported this translation often later supported the Norwegian Bible translation.

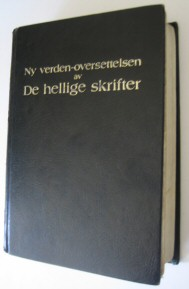
New World Translation of the Holy Scriptures.

The New World Translation of the Holy Scriptures is the Norwegian-language translation used by Jehovah's Witnesses'. The whole Bible was published in Norwegian in 1996, after an edition of the New Testament was published in 1992. The translation into English was made from the original languages by anonymous translators. Translations into other languages are based largely on the English-language version. One way in which the translation differs from other translations is that God's name is rendered Jehovah in both the Old and New Testaments.

The Bible, God's Word, also known as the "Norwegian King James", was published by Bible Publishing House in 1997. The same publishing company had previously released a translation of the New Testament in 1995, a translation that was included in this release. This translation is different from other Norwegian translation by adding the so-called Textus Receptus as a basis for the translation.

Jacob Jervell published a translation of the four Gospels in the series World Scriptures in 2002, on behalf of The Norwegian book clubs. This edition has been known for the debate that arose around Jervell's use of the word Gehenna instead of Hell.

In 2003, Bearing Precious Seed of Milford, Ohio published a Norwegian Bible translated by Morten Gjemlestad directly from the English text of the Authorized (King James) Version. 10,000 copies were printed.

=== Both forms of Norwegian ===
The Youth translation of the New Testament was founded by Eivind Berggrav, who was the bishop of Oslo in 1937, which at the time made him also the chairman of the Bible Society. He believed that the language in translations from the 1930 and '38 were out of touch with the language of Norway's youth, so he initiated a project to create a youth translation. Berggrav suggested that efforts should be made in two stages, first a rapid linguistic revision of the previous translation, and then a new, complete translation from the original languages. War delayed the start of this work, but by 1949 the project was well underway. A trial version of the Gospel of Mark was published in 1951. The youth version of the entire New Testament in Bokmål was published in 1959, the same year Berggrav died, and the version in Nynorsk was published in 1961. Both translations received much praise for good language, and this work, much of the backdrop for the translation, published in 1978. The language's syntax had been deliberately made more Norwegian, contrasting the new youth edition with the Danish language Bibles that had set the tone before this point. More guidance from the Norwegian language was used in this translation than in previous translations.

This translation appeared in 1975 as an illustrated edition under the name Good News. The New Testament for people today. This edition placed an emphasis on readability, and printed, among other things, with larger letters than previous editions. The illustrations of Annie Vallotton were used in several similar Bible editions in several languages. This was a popular translation used in schools, and came out in several editions. It was reprinted in 2005 using the 2005 translation of the New Testament.

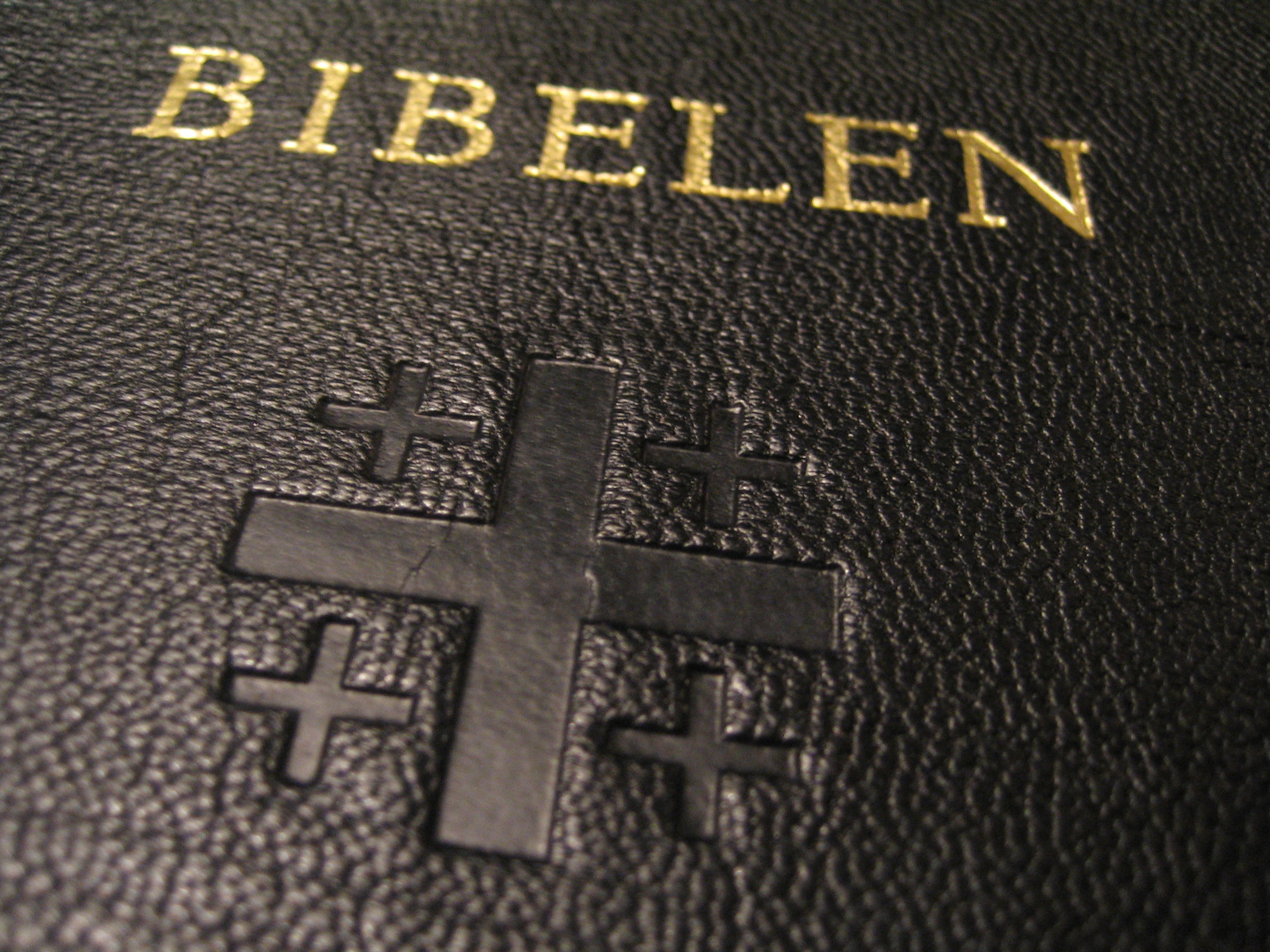
Detail from the cover of an edition of the 1978 translation

Bible Society 1978 translation (NO78) was rooted primarily in the need for youth translation. This translation was a complete revision of previous translations, and was the second part of Berggravs plan. The Bible Society decided to start work in 1954, and by 1956 had formulated the basic principles of the new Bible translation. The next translation was meant to be written in a vibrant and modern language. The translation should this time be idiomatic, putting a greater emphasis on preserving the meaning of the basic text, instead of merely translating word-for-word. After various parts of the Bible were translated, test versions were published. Selections from the Old Testament (1966) was published in both Bokmål and Nynorsk, Psalms was published in Bokmål 1967, and Thus saith the Lord. The twelve prophets (1973) was published in both Bokmål and Nynorsk. These issues were with introduction and notes in the text. Several trial versions of the New Testament were also published before the entire New Testament was published officially in both Bokmål and Nynorsk in 1975, and the whole Bible likewise in 1978. Before the final release in 1978, there were consultations among ministers, theologians and linguists, and some changes were made to test editions. The final approval was made by the Bible Society's central board, which consisted of, among others, all the bishops in The Norwegian Church and representatives of the Evangelical Lutheran Free Church of Norway.

The translation was very well received; Swedish bishop Bo Giertz asserted that it was the best Bible translation. This edition had a great influence on Bible translation in the other Nordic countries, and was important when Sweden and Denmark got new Bible translations, in 2000 and 1992 respectively. The 1978 translation was also one of the first in the world to use gender-inclusive language in places, for example, where the original text had used masculine language like "brother" despite referring to both sexes that translation used "brothers and sisters."

In 1985, there was another revised edition of this translation that is referred to as 1978/85-utgaven.

The newest translation, Bible 2011, called Bibelen 2011 bokmål in Norway, was released on 19 October 2011. The first part of this translation, NT05, was published in 2005 when the Bible Society released its new translation of the New Testament. This translation uses a more literary language rather than focusing on translating each word. Also, it uses more common terms, such as Mary was called a "virgin" in the 1978 version, but in the newest translation she is referred to instead as a "young" woman. The version was the 2012 top selling book in Norway.

== Other languages in Norway ==
The Norwegian Bible Society has also produced translations in Sámi languages and other languages.
