= Mary Aue =

Nieuan New Zealand leader

Mary Aue MNZM
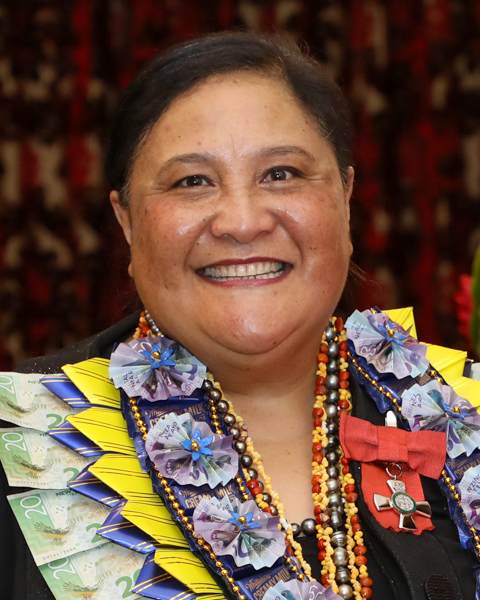
- Education: Mangere College
- Awards: Member of the New Zealand Order of Merit

Mary Puatuki Aue MNZM is a Niuean–New Zealand STEM advocate, social media specialist and Pacific and Māori leader. In 1999 Aue launched the Coconut Wireless community newsletter, which later relaunched as a social media platform, and she also founded the South Auckland STEM group to encourage Pacific and Māori children into technology. In 2023 Aue was appointed a Member of the New Zealand Order of Merit for services to education, technology and Pacific and Māori communities.

== Early life ==
Aue was born in Niue, to Don and Melepepe Aue, and is affiliated with the villages of Hakupu and Vaiea. She grew up in Grey Lynn, Ōtara and Glen Innes, and lives in Mangere.

== Career ==
Aue has led the Accelerating Auckland Youth and Community Engagement Programme since 2005, as a volunteer. In 2019, with assistance from the Ministry for Pacific Peoples' Toloa Community Fund, Aue led the establishment of a group to encourage Māori and Pacific children to study technology, South Auckland STEM. The South Auckland STEM group operates a holiday programme, a mentorship programme and internship programmes with local companies, and has registered more than 200 students.

In 1999 Aue launched a community electronic newsletter, Coconut Wireless, which had over 10,000 subscribers. The newsletter was relaunched a social media platform in 2014, following which it had 900,000 followers and a global reach. Aue trained more than 200 other volunteers to use social media for community connection following the 2022 tsunami in Tonga.

== Honours and awards ==
In the 2023 King's Birthday and Coronation Honours, Aue was appointed a Member of the New Zealand Order of Merit for services to education, technology and Pacific and Māori communities.
