= Swedish Bible Society =

Swedish Christian non-profit organization

The Swedish Bible Society (Swedish: Svenska Bibelsällskapet) is a Swedish Christian non-profit organization founded on 22 February 1815 to spread the Bible to the Swedish people. It was inspired by the British and Foreign Bible Society, which had been founded in 1804. Today, its work is focused on promoting and facilitating Bible reading and use. Bible societies were gradually established in all dioceses in Sweden, but over time the activities have taken different forms. Internationally, the Bible Society has been part of the United Bible Societies (UBS) since 1946.

== History ==
The Swedish Bible Society was founded in large part through the work of Swedish priest Gustaf Brunnmark. He had become a member of the British and Foreign Bible Society in 1804 and looked into the possibility of spreading the Bible more widely in Sweden. With the help of John Paterson and Ebenezer Henderson, the Evangelical Society in Stockholm was soon founded, and Brunnmark started Bible societies in Gothenburg, Visby, and Västerås. In a meeting of the Evangelical Society in 1814, he proposed the founding of the Swedish Bible Society, which took place the following year, although Brunnmark died before its founding. Moravian Gustaf Keyser was also one of the founders of the organization. The royal family donated to it and King Charles XIII declared himself its protector. Count Mathias Rosenblad was actively involved in the organization, leading to the founding of the Norwegian Bible Society in 1816.

== Work ==
The Swedish Bible Society is an ecumenical association and its members include most of the Christian denominations in Sweden, the Finnish Ecumenical Council, the Swedish Royal Academy and the Royal Swedish Academy of Letters.

According to its statutes, it is responsible for translating the Bible, publishing books, distributing Bibles and Bible literature, working with new media, promoting the use of the Bible, fundraising for Bible work in Sweden and abroad, and managing the state fund, the Bible Fund. For reasons of principle, questions of Bible interpretation are left to others, such as the faith communities whose beliefs are based on the Bible. It is stated that the society works in the conviction that the mission is given by God.

The Swedish Bible Society was responsible for the launch of the new translation, Bibel 2000, which began to be used in 1999 and had been developed by the government-appointed 1973 Swedish Bible Commission. The work was completed when Bibel 2000 was presented as the public inquiry SOU 2000:100. The state does not intend to take responsibility for any further Bible translation. The Swedish Bible Society, which has a special translation unit, continues to monitor translation issues and research. The intention is to produce a new, scientifically-based Bible translation that can be put into use when the present one has outlived its usefulness. An entirely new translation of the New Testament is underway, financed by the association's fund, and is planned to be published in 2026. The translation unit also coordinates Swedish translations of the Dead Sea Scrolls.

Internationally, the Bible Society works in collaboration with UBS on the translation of Bibles into languages other than Swedish, as well as the printing and distribution of Bibles. The Swedish Bible Society has also founded its own publishing company to publish Bibles, commentaries, audiobooks, educational materials, and more.

A version of the Bible in Swedish Sign Language was published in 2021.

The headquarters of the Swedish Bible Society are in Uppsala. As of 2020, the chair is Bishop Åke Bonnier. Anders Göranzon, a priest in the Church of Sweden, has been the secretary-general since 2019.

== The Bible Fund ==
Bibelfonden (the Bible Fund), technically Stiftelsen Svenska Bibelsällskapets bibelfond (Swedish Bible Society's Bible Fund Foundation), is a state foundation administered by the Swedish Bible Society. The fund was founded in 1978 by the state in connection with the publication of Bibel 2000 and accrues the royalties from its publication. The fund primarily supports efforts to monitor and work on Bible translation issues and to promote interest in the Bible. The fund will finance the next translation of the Bible. Provisions concerning the Bible Fund are laid down in a special agreement.

The Bible Fund has a special board of trustees that decides on the management of the Fund's resources, as well as on the allocation of funds from the Fund. The members of the board are the board of the Bible Society, with the addition of representatives of Svenska Bokförläggareföreningen (Swedish Publishers' Association) and Kristna Bokförläggareföreningen (Christian Publishers' Association), as well as a member appointed by the government. The board also has the task of safeguarding the rights of the researchers and authors who participated in the work on Bibel 2000.

== See also ==
- Bible translations into Swedish
- The Gideons International
- Colportage
