= Matthäus Aurogallus =

Bohemian linguist

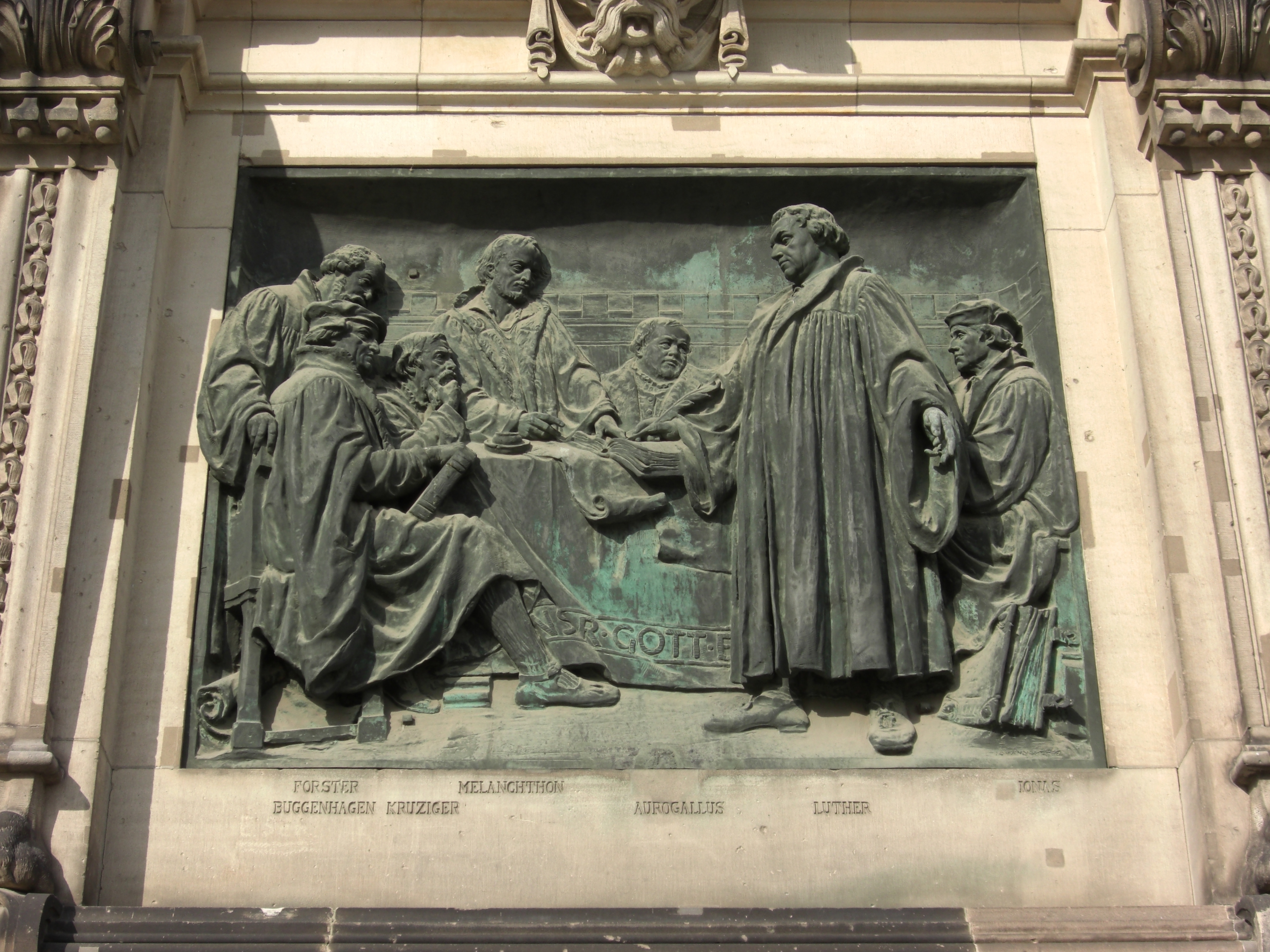
- Relief from the Berlin Cathedral depicting Matthäus Aurogallus, Martin Luther, and Phillip Melanchthon
- Born: Matthäus Goldhahn; 1490; Chomutov, Bohemia, Crown of Bohemia (now the Czech Republic)
- Died: 10 November 1543 (aged 52–53); Wittenberg, Saxony, Holy Roman Empire (now Germany)
- Occupations: professor of Hebrew, linguist

Academic background
- Education: Leipzig University
- Influences: Martin Luther, Rashi, Nicholas of Lyra

Academic work
- Institutions: Wittenberg University
- Main interests: Hebrew, Greek, Aramaic, Theology

Matthäus Aurogallus (1490 – 10 November 1543), born as Matthäus Goldhahn (he latinized his name Aurogallus in the fashion of renaissance humanists), was a Bohemian linguist. Aurogallus served as professor of Hebrew at the University of Wittenberg and was a colleague of Philip Melanchthon and Martin Luther. He assisted Luther in the revision of the reformer's translation of the Old Testament and made valuable contributions to the academic study of Hebrew.

== Early life and education ==
Matthäus Aurogallus was born in Chomutov (German: Komotau) in northeastern Bohemia, where also began his education at nearby humanist school founded by Czech nobleman and writer Bohuslav Hasištejnský z Lobkovic in his family home, Hasištejn Castle. There, Aurogallus studied Latin, Greek, and Hebrew. He then studied Hebrew in Leipzig from 1512 to 1515, where he earned a Bachelor of Arts, before returning to Komotau to teach Latin at his former school.

== Wittenberg and Luther ==
In 1519 Aurogallus left his position and moved to Wittenberg, where he began a friendly relationship with Philip Melanchthon. Melanchthon had recently accepted a position as professor of Greek at the University of Wittenberg on the recommendation of his great-uncle, Johannes Reuchlin. During this time, Melanchthon had the opportunity to observe Aurogallus’ impressive command of Hebrew. Two years later, at the recommendation of Melanchthon and Luther, Aurogallus also joined Wittenberg’s faculty as professor of Hebrew, replacing Matthäus Adrian, who – although he had been recommended for the position by Luther several years earlier – was removed from the post after his vocal opposition to Luther’s religious reforms.

At the time, Wittenburg – under Luther's leadership – was the epicentre of the Protestant Reformation, and Aurogallus was drawn into the movement at least peripherally as a scholar of Hebrew. Aurogallus acted as an adviser to Martin Luther on Hebrew translation while the latter was composing his translation of the Old Testament. He was also able to borrow rare manuscripts from Lobkovic’s extensive library, which he lent to Luther and Melanchthon, further aiding in the translation process. In 1540, Luther published a revision of his translations of the book of Psalms after Aurogallus had reviewed and improved the previous edition.

On 1 May 1542 Aurogallus attained the prestigious position of rector of the University of Wittenberg.

== Contributions to Hebrew Studies ==
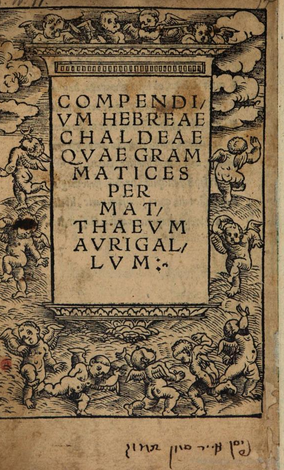
The title page of Aurogallus' Compendium Hebreae Chaldeaequae grammatices (1525)

Aurogallus served as professor of Hebrew in Wittenberg from 1521 until his death on 10 November 1543. During this time, he collaborated with Luther on the latter's translation of the Old Testament. Unlike his predecessor, Matthäus Adrien, Aurogallus' approach to the study of Hebrew matched that of Luther. Both he and Luther considered the primary purpose of the study of Hebrew as a philological means to determine the true meaning of the Scriptures.

Despite this, Aurogallus included a list of common abbreviations found in rabbinical commentaries in his Compendium Hebreae Grammatices. He also based his discussion of the etymology of biblical names in his De Hebraeis, urbium, regionum, populorum, fluminum, montium, & aliorulocorum, nominibus (Names of Hebrew, cities, regions, peoples, rivers, mountains and other places) on Rashi and Targumim, as well as classical and medieval authors, demonstrating a much deeper interest in Hebrew scholarship for its own sake than Luther.

This utilization of rabbinical texts in the study of Hebrew was contrary to Luther’s strict conception of the study of Hebrew in a purely Christian context. It helped move Hebrew studies towards becoming a discipline in its own right, rather than a subcategory of theology. Aurogallus also expanded the consideration of semitic sources of biblical commentary to Aramaic, and wrote a grammar of Chaldean (a Neo-Aramaic language), which was added to his Hebrew grammar in later printings.

== Works ==
- Compendium Hebreae Chaldeaequae grammatices (Compendium of Hebrew and Chaldaic Grammar) (1523–25, 1531 Wittenberg)
- De Hebraeis, urbium, regionum, populorum, fluminum, montium, & aliorulocorum, nominibus (1526 Wittenberg, 1539 & 1543 Basel)
- Chronik der Herzöge uund Könige von Böhmen (Chronicle of the Dukes and Kings of Bohemia (lost)
- Hebräisch historisch-geographisches Reallexicon (Hebrew historical-geographic lexicon) (1526–1539)
