= Mathias Rosenblad =

Swedish count and civil servant (1758–1847)

His Excellency The High Well-born Count Mathias Rosenblad
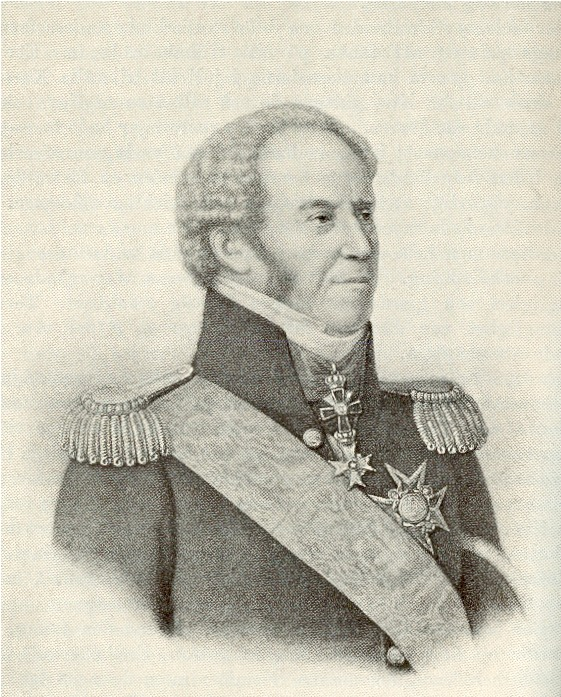

2nd Prime Minister for Justice
- In office 1829–1840
- Preceded by: Fredrik Gyllenborg
- Succeeded by: Arvid Mauritz Posse

Personal details
- Born: 23 June 1758 Lund, Sweden
- Died: 4 September 1847 (aged 89) Ekerö parish, Stockholm County, Sweden

Count Mathias Rosenblad (23 June 1758 – 4 September 1847) was a Swedish count, a Lord of the Realm, civil servant, politician, and minister of justice from 1829 to 1840.

== Biography ==
Mathias Rosenblad was the son of physician Eberhard Rosenblad and Eleonora von Hermansson. He studied at Lund University, where he graduated in law, after which he was employed in the Judicial Commission and the Auditor General Division. From 1780 to 1784 he was secretary to the Chancellor of Justice, and then secretary to the Auditor General.

In 1794 Rosenblad was appointed Secretary of State in the Civil Division, and gained increasing influence in the Chancellery. He was a member of several state committees, was entrusted by the King with positions of trust, and participated in the Riksdag, where he was a member of the secret committee (sekreta utskottet). For his merits he was elevated to the rank of Lord of the Realm, to the rank of baron (friherre), and to that of count (1815).

After the state reform of 1809, which resulted in the 1809 Instrument of Government, he was appointed to the Council of State on 9 June and played a prominent role both in the implementation of the state organisation and later in the union negotiations with Norway in 1814. He was a close associate of Gustav IV Adolf, but when the latter was deposed Rosenblad does not seem to have come to his defence. Liberals, however, considered Rosenblad the embodiment of the blindly obedient yes-men among the royalists.

On 31 August 1829 Rosenblad was appointed Minister of Justice, and remained in that position until 6 February 1840. His bureaucratic and conservative style was disapproved of by Parliament, and in 1834 he was impeached, but acquitted. He resigned in 1840 on the advice of the king, and was then eighty-two years old.

Rosenblad was a Knight in the Order of the Seraphim. In 1797, he was elected a member of the Royal Swedish Academy of Sciences. He was persuaded by Gustaf Brunnmark to become the president of the Evangelical Society of Stockholm, continuing its work after Brunnmark died shortly thereafter. Rosenblad was a member of the Swedish Bible Society and the Swedish Mission Society, and on 21 May 1805 he became an honorary member of the Royal Swedish Academy of Letters, History and Antiquities. From 1804–1806 he was president of the Pro Fide et Christianismo society.

He was a supporter of Scottish Methodist missionary George Scott while Scott was living and preaching in Stockholm.

He married Charlotta Maria Toutin in 1790; they had no children.

Preceded by Fredrik Gyllenborg	Prime Minister for Justice; 1829–1840	Succeeded by Arvid Mauritz Posse
