= Hans Lufft =

German printer and publisher

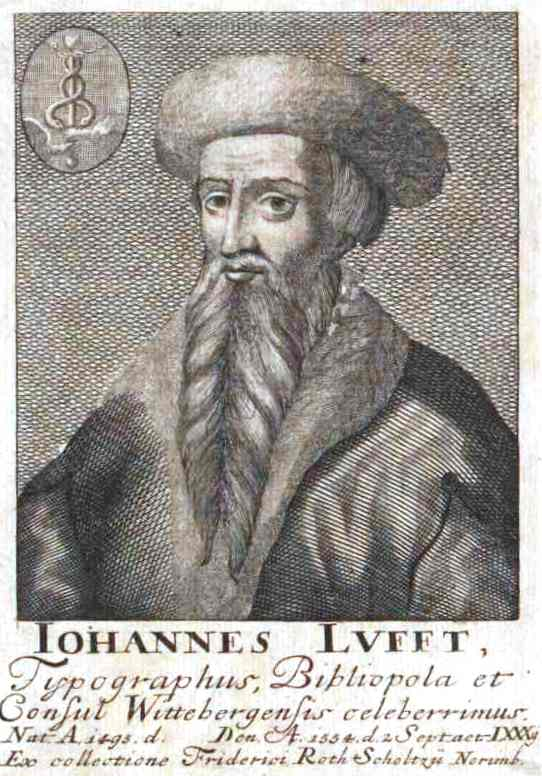
Hans Lufft

Hans Lufft (1495–1584) was a German printer and publisher, commonly called "the Bible Printer," because in 1534 he printed at Wittenberg the first complete edition of Luther's Bible, in two Folio volumes with woodcut illustrations by Lucas Cranach. Lufft printed in the 50 years following more than 100,000 copies of the German Bible. He also printed many of Luther's other works.
