= Authorship of the Epistle to the Hebrews =

Question in biblical authorship

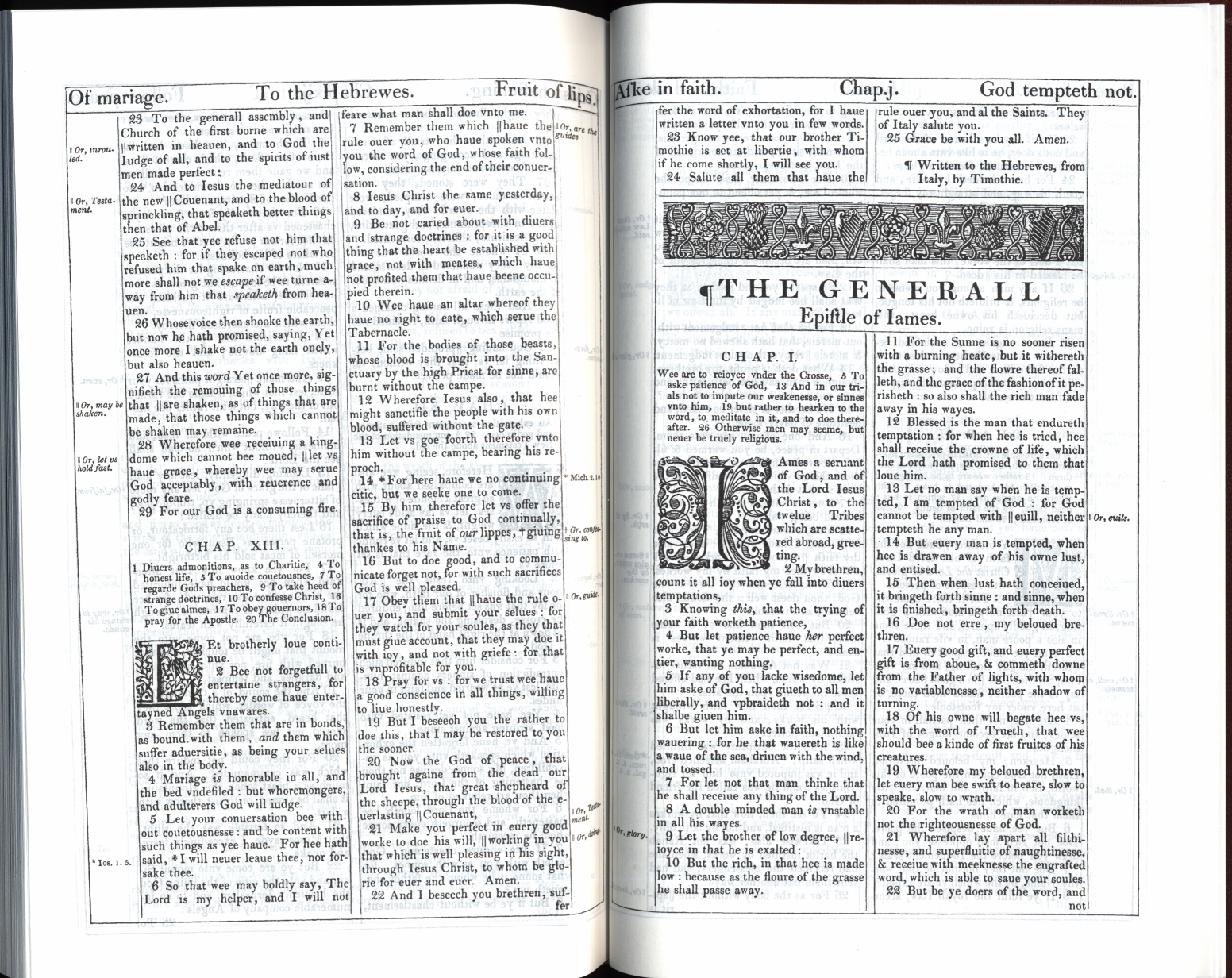
The 1611 edition of the King James Bible ends the Epistle to the Hebrews with "Written to the Hebrewes, from Italy, by Timothie".

The Epistle to the Hebrews of the Christian Bible is one of the New Testament books whose canonicity was disputed. Traditionally, Paul the Apostle was thought to be the author. However, since the third century this has been questioned, and the consensus among most modern scholars is that the author is unknown.

== Ancient views ==
The Epistle to the Hebrews was included in the collected writings of Paul from a very early date. For example, the late second-century or early third-century codex 𝔓^{46}, a volume of Paul's general epistles, includes Hebrews immediately after Romans.

While the assumption of Pauline authorship readily allowed its acceptance in the Eastern Church, doubts persisted in the West.

Eusebius does not list Epistle to the Hebrews among the antilegomena or disputed books (though he included the unrelated Gospel of the Hebrews). He does record, however, that "some have rejected the Epistle to the Hebrews, saying that it is disputed by the church of Rome, on the ground that it was not written by Paul." In response, he endorses the view of Clement of Alexandria: that the epistle was written by Paul in Hebrew (unsigned through modesty), and "translated carefully" into Greek by Luke, a thing demonstrated by its stylistic similarity with Luke's Acts.

Doubts about Pauline authorship were raised around the end of the second century, predominantly in the West. Tertullian attributed the epistle to Barnabas. Both Gaius of Rome and Hippolytus excluded Hebrews from the works of Paul, the latter attributing it to Clement of Rome. Origen noted that others had claimed Clement or Luke as the writer, but he tentatively accepted Pauline origin of the thought in the text and the explanation of Clement of Alexandria, saying that "the thoughts are those of the apostle, but the diction and phraseology are those of some one who remembered the apostolic teachings, and wrote down at his leisure what had been said by his teacher", as quoted by Eusebius.

Jerome, aware of such lingering doubts, included the epistle in his Vulgate but moved it to the end of Paul's writings. Augustine affirmed Paul's authorship and vigorously defended the epistle. By then its acceptance in the New Testament canon was well settled.

== Modern views ==
In general, the evidence against Pauline authorship is considered too solid for scholarly dispute. Donald Guthrie, in his New Testament Introduction (1976), commented that "most modern writers find more difficulty in imagining how this Epistle was ever attributed to Paul than in disposing of the theory." Harold Attridge tells us that "it is certainly not a work of the apostle". Daniel B. Wallace, who holds to the traditional authorship of the other epistles, states that "the arguments against Pauline authorship, however, are conclusive." As a result, although a few people today believe Paul wrote Hebrews, such as theologian R. C. Sproul, contemporary scholars generally reject Pauline authorship. As Richard Heard notes, in his Introduction to the New Testament, "modern critics have confirmed that the epistle cannot be attributed to Paul and have for the most part agreed with Origen's judgement, 'But as to who wrote the epistle, only God knows the truth.'"

Attridge argues that similarities with Paul's work are simply a product of a shared usage of traditional concepts and language. Others, however, have suggested that they are not accidental, and that the work is a deliberate forgery attempting to pass itself off as a work of Paul.

== Internal evidence ==
=== Internal anonymity ===
The text as it has been passed down to the present time is internally anonymous, though some older title headings attribute it to the Apostle Paul.

=== Identification as a second-generation Christian ===
In Hebrews 2:3, the author states that this "great salvation" was "declared at first by the Lord, and it was attested to us by those who heard". This is usually taken to indicate the author was a second-generation Christian.

=== Stylistic differences from Paul ===
The style is notably different from the rest of Paul's epistles, a characteristic noted by Clement of Alexandria (c. 210), who argued, according to Eusebius, that the original letter had a Hebrew audience and so was written in Hebrew and later translated into Greek, "some say [by] the evangelist Luke, others... [by] Clement [of Rome]... The second suggestion is more convincing, in view of the similarity of phraseology shown throughout by the Epistle of Clement and the Epistle to the Hebrews, and in absence of any great difference between the two works in the underlying thought." He concluded that "as a result of this translation, the same complexion of style is found in this Epistle and in the Acts: but that the [words] 'Paul an apostle' were naturally not prefixed. For, he says, 'in writing to Hebrews who had conceived a prejudice against him and were suspicious of him, he very wisely did not repel them at the beginning by putting his name.'"

This stylistic difference has led Martin Luther and Lutheran churches to refer to Hebrews as one of the antilegomena, one of the books whose authenticity and usefulness was questioned. As a result, it is placed with James, Jude, and Revelation, at the end of Luther's canon.

=== Stylistic similarities to Paul ===
Some theologians and groups, such as Jehovah's Witnesses, who continue to maintain Pauline authorship, repeat the opinion of Eusebius that Paul omitted his name because he, the Apostle to the Gentiles, was writing to the Jews. They conjecture that Jews would have likely dismissed the letter if they had known Paul to be the source. They theorize that the stylistic differences from Paul's other letters are attributed to his writing in Hebrew to the Hebrews, and that the letter was translated into Greek by Luke.

Paul is also the only Biblical author, or Jewish author of the same period, to use the analogy of "spiritual milk" negatively contrasted with "solid food" (Hebrews 5:12ff cf. 1 Corinthians 3:2ff). No other author treats spiritual milk negatively, with Old Testament witnesses always speaking milk in a positive sense of nourishment, while Peter employs the term "spiritual milk" as something Christians should "yearn for" in 1 Peter 2:2. The analogy of Christian maturity as moving from milk to meat is unique to Paul’s writing.

In the 13th chapter of Hebrews, Timothy is referred to as a companion. Timothy was Paul's missionary companion in the same way Jesus sent disciples out in pairs. Also, the writer states that he wrote the letter from "Italy", which also at the time fits Paul. The difference in style is explained as simply an adjustment to a more specific audience, to the Jewish Christians who were being persecuted and pressured to go back to old Judaism.

The epistle contains Paul's classic closing greeting, "Grace... be with you..." as he stated explicitly in 2 Thessalonians 3:17–18 and as implied in 1 Corinthians 16:21–24 and Colossians 4:18. This closing greeting is included at the end of each of Paul's letters:

Comparison of Final Greetings
Book	Verse	Greek Text (Uncial Letters)
1. Romans	Rom 16:20	Η ΧΑΡΙϹ ΤΟΥ ΚΥΡΙΟΥ ΗΜⲰΝ ΙΗϹΟΥ ΜΕΘ ΥΜⲰΝ.
2. 1Corinthians	1Cor 16:23	Η ΧΑΡΙϹ ΤΟΥ ΚΥΡΙΟΥ ΙΗϹΟΥ ΜΕΘ ΥΜⲰΝ.
3. 2Corinthians	2Cor 13:13	Η ΧΑΡΙϹ ΤΟΥ ΚΥΡΙΟΥ ΙΗϹΟΥ ΧΡΙϹΤΟΥ ΚΑΙ Η ΑΓΑΠΗ ΤΟΥ ΘΕΟΥ ΚΑΙ Η ΚΟΙΝⲰΝΙΑ
4. Galatians	Gal 6:18	Η ΧΑΡΙϹ ΤΟΥ ΚΥΡΙΟΥ ΗΜⲰΝ ΙΗϹΟΥ ΧΡΙϹΤΟΥ ΜΕΤΑ ΤΟΥ ΠΝΕΥΜΑΤΟϹ ΥΜⲰΝ ...
5. Ephesians	Eph 6:24	Η ΧΑΡΙϹ ΜΕΤΑ ΠΑΝΤⲰΝ ΤⲰΝ ΑΓΑΠⲰΝΤⲰΝ ΤΟΝ ΚΥΡΙΟΝ ...
6. Philippians	Phil 4:23	Η ΧΑΡΙϹ ΤΟΥ ΚΥΡΙΟΥ ΙΗϹΟΥ ΧΡΙϹΤΟΥ ΜΕΤΑ ΤΟΥ ΠΝΕΥΜΑΤΟϹ ΥΜⲰΝ.
7. Colossians	Col 4:18	Η ΧΑΡΙϹ ΜΕΘ ΥΜⲰΝ.
8. 1Thessalonians	1Thes 5:28	Η ΧΑΡΙϹ ΤΟΥ ΚΥΡΙΟΥ ΗΜⲰΝ ΙΗϹΟΥ ΧΡΙϹΤΟΥ ΜΕΘ ΥΜⲰΝ.
9. 2Thessalonians	2Thes 3:18	Η ΧΑΡΙϹ ΤΟΥ ΚΥΡΙΟΥ ΗΜⲰΝ ΙΗϹΟΥ ΧΡΙϹΤΟΥ ΜΕΤΑ ΠΑΝΤⲰΝ ΥΜⲰΝ.
	2Thes 3:17–18	I, Paul, write this greeting with my own hand. This is the sign of genuineness in every letter of mine; it is the way I write. THE GRACE OF OUR LORD JESUS CHRIST BE WITH YOU ALL.
10. 1Timothy	1Tim 6:21	Η ΧΑΡΙϹ ΜΕΘ ΥΜⲰΝ.
11. 2Timothy	2Tim 4:22	Η ΧΑΡΙϹ ΜΕΘ ΥΜⲰΝ.
12. Titus	Titus 3:15	Η ΧΑΡΙϹ ΜΕΤΑ ΠΑΝΤⲰΝ ΥΜⲰΝ.
13. Philemon	Philemon 1:25	Η ΧΑΡΙϹ ΤΟΥ ΚΥΡΙΟΥ ΙΗϹΟΥ ΧΡΙϹΤΟΥ ΜΕΤΑ ΤΟΥ ΠΝΕΥΜΑΤΟϹ ΥΜⲰΝ.
14. Hebrews	Heb 13:25	Η ΧΑΡΙϹ ΜΕΤΑ ΠΑΝΤⲰΝ ΥΜⲰΝ. (Hē charis meta pantōn hymōn)
15. James	-	-
16. 1Peter	1Pet 5:14	ΑϹΠΑϹΑϹΘΕ ΑΛΛΗΛΟΥϹ ΕΝ ΦΙΛΗΜΑΤΙ ΑΓΑΠΗϹ ...
17. 2Peter	2Pet 3:18	ΑΥΤⲰ Η ΔΟΞΑ ΚΑΙ ΝΥΝ ΚΑΙ ΕΙϹ ΗΜΕΡΑΝ ΑΙⲰΝΟϹ.
18. 1John	1John 5:21	ΤΕΚΝΙΑ, ΦΥΛΑΞΑΤΕ ΕΑΥΤΑ ΑΠΟ ΤⲰΝ ΕΙΔⲰΛⲰΝ.
19. 2John	2John 1:13	ΑϹΠΑΖΕΤΑΙ ϹΕ ΤΑ ΤΕΚΝΑ ΤΗϹ ΑΔΕΛΦΗϹ ϹΟΥ ΤΗϹ ΕΚΛΕΚΤΗϹ.
20. 3John	1John 1:15	ΕΙΡΗΝΗ ϹΟΙ. ΑϹΠΑΖΟΝΤΑΙ ϹΕ ΟΙ ΦΙΛΟΙ. ΑϹΠΑΖΟΥ ΤΟΥϹ ΦΙΛΟΥϹ ΚΑΤ ΟΝΟΜΑ.
21. Jude	Jude 1:24	ΤⲰ ΔΕ ΔΥΝΑΜΕΝⲰ ΦΥΛΑΞΑΙ ΥΜΑϹ ΑΠΤΑΙϹΤΟΥϹ ΚΑΙ ϹΤΗϹΑΙ ΚΑΤΕΝⲰΠΙΟΝ ...
23. Revelation	Revelation 22:21	Η ΧΑΡΙϹ ΤΟΥ ΚΥΡΙΟΥ ΥΜⲰΝ ΙΗϹΟΥ ΧΡΙϹΤΟΥ ΜΕΤΑ ΠΑΝΤⲰΝ ΥΜⲰΝ. AMHN

Although the writing style varies from Paul in a number of ways, some similarities in wordings to some of the Pauline epistles have been noted. In antiquity, some began to ascribe it to Paul in an attempt to provide the anonymous work an explicit apostolic pedigree.

== Other possible authors ==
=== Priscilla ===
In more recent times, some scholars have advanced a case for Priscilla having been the author of the Epistle to the Hebrews. This suggestion came from Adolf von Harnack in 1900. Harnack claimed that the Epistle was "written to Rome—not to the church, but to the inner circle"; that the earliest tradition 'blotted out' the name of the author; that "we must look for a person who was intimately associated with Paul and Timothy, as the author" and that Priscilla matched this description.

Ruth Hoppin provides considerable support for her conviction that Priscilla had written the Epistle to the Hebrews. She maintains that Priscilla "meets every qualification, matches every clue, and looms ubiquitous in every line of investigation". She suggests that the masculine participle may have been altered by a scribe, or that the author was deliberately using a neutral participle "as a kind of abstraction".

=== Barnabas ===
Tertullian (On Modesty 20) suggested Barnabas as the author: "For there is extant withal an Epistle to the Hebrews under the name of Barnabas—a man sufficiently accredited by God, as being one whom Paul has stationed next to himself...". Internal considerations suggest the author was male, was an acquaintance of Timothy, and was located in Italy. Barnabas, to whom some noncanonical works have been attributed (such as Epistle of Barnabas), was close to Paul in his ministry.

=== Luke, Clement, Apollos ===
Other possible authors were suggested as early as the third century CE. Origen of Alexandria (c. 240) suggested either Luke the Evangelist or Clement of Rome. Martin Luther proposed Apollos, described as an Alexandrian and "a learned man", popular in Corinth, and adept at using the scriptures and arguing for Christianity while "refuting the Jews".
