= Development of the New Testament canon =

The canon of the New Testament is the set of books many modern Christians regard as divinely inspired and constituting the New Testament of the Christian Bible. For most churches, the canon is an agreed-upon list of 27 books that includes the canonical Gospels, Acts, letters attributed to various apostles, and Revelation.

Initially the canon was a list of the books suited to be read out in church liturgies and used to justify doctrine. The lists initially differed among the geographically-separated churches in antiquity, according to ancient church historian Eusebius. There is a consensus that the 27 books constituting the canon today are the same 27 books generally recognized in the first centuries.

== Overview ==
For historical Christians, canonization was based on whether the material was written by the apostles or their close associates, rather than claims of divine inspiration. However, some biblical scholars with diverse disciplines now reject the claim that any texts of the Bible were written by the earliest apostles (though many of the Pauline letters were likely written by Paul or close associates of his).

For most churches, the canon is an agreed-upon list of 27 books that includes the canonical Gospels, Acts, letters attributed to various apostles, and Revelation. Although there are many textual variations, most scholars believe that the original text of the New Testament can be established with a reasonable degree of accuracy.

- The Catholic Church provided a conciliar definition of its biblical canon in 382 at the (local) Council of Rome (based upon the Decretum Gelasianum, of uncertain authorship) as well as at the Council of Trent of 1545, reaffirming the Canons of Florence of 1442 and North African Councils (Hippo and Carthage) of 393–419.
- For the Church of England, it was made dogmatic on the Thirty-Nine Articles of 1563; for Calvinism, on the Westminster Confession of Faith of 1647.

The core books of the New Testament were completed before 120 AD, with the Gospels being finished slightly earlier (the first of which, Mark, was likely written close to 70 AD). Although the list of what books constituted the canon (i.e., list of books to read out in church) initially differed among the geographically-separated churches in antiquity, according to ancient church historian Eusebius, there is a consensus that the 27 books constituting the canon today are the same 27 books generally recognized in the first centuries.

For the first three hundred years of Christianity, there was no entirely agreed-upon canon. Some of Paul's letters and the four Gospels whose authorship were attributed to Mark, Matthew, Luke and John were read publicly in certain churches. The earliest record of attempt at compiling a canon was made by Marcion, c. 140 AD, who accepted only a modified version of Luke and ten of Paul's letters, while rejecting the Old Testament entirely. Irenaeus (died c. 202) quotes and cites 21 books that would end up as part of the New Testament, but does not use Philemon, Hebrews, James, 2 Peter, 3 John and Jude. By the early 3rd century, Origen of Alexandria may have been using the same 27 books as in the modern New Testament, though there were still disputes over the canonicity of Hebrews, James, 2 Peter, 2 and 3 John, and Revelation (see also Antilegomena). Likewise by 200, the Muratorian fragment shows that there existed a set of Christian writings somewhat similar to what is now the New Testament, which included four gospels and argued against objections to them. Thus, while there was plenty of discussion in the Early Church over the New Testament canon, the "major" writings were accepted by almost all Christian authorities by the middle of the second century.

After the council of Nicaea in year 325, Roman Emperor Constantine instructed Eusebius to put together accepted Christian Scriptures that would be displayed in churches. However, nothing is known if Eusebius was successful in completing the task.

One of the oldest bibles in existence is the Codex Vaticanus which was written around year 350. The Codex is currently kept in the Vatican Library. It has the 27 books of the New Testament which are accepted by all Christian denominations today. The 27 books were canonized in the council of Hippo in year 393. This was later affirmed in the council of Carthage in years 397 and 419. Evidence corroborates the claims of the fourth century church councils that their canonical list are the same 27 books that the church received from the earliest bishops.

The next two hundred years followed a similar process of continual discussion throughout the entire Church, and localized refinements of acceptance. This process was not yet complete at the time of the First Council of Nicaea in 325, though substantial progress had been made by then. Though a list was clearly necessary to fulfill Constantine's commission in 331 of fifty copies of the Bible for the Church at Constantinople, no concrete evidence exists to indicate that it was considered to be a formal canon. In the absence of a canonical list, the resolution of questions would normally have been directed through the see of Constantinople, in consultation with Bishop Eusebius of Caesarea (who was given the commission), and perhaps other bishops who were available locally.

In his Easter letter of 367, Athanasius, Bishop of Alexandria, gave a list of exactly the same books that would formally become the New Testament canon, and was the first to use the word "canonized" (κανονιζομενα) in regard to them. The first council that accepted the present Catholic canon (the Canon of Trent) was the Council of Rome, held by Pope Damasus I (382). A second council was held at the Synod of Hippo (393) reaffirming the previous council list. A brief summary of the acts was read at and accepted by the Council of Carthage (397) and the Council of Carthage (419). These councils took place under the authority of St. Augustine, who regarded the canon as already closed. Pope Damasus I's Council of Rome in 382, if the Decretum Gelasianum is correctly associated with it, issued a biblical canon identical to that mentioned above, or if not the list is at least a 6th-century compilation claiming a 4th-century imprimatur. Likewise, Damasus's commissioning of the Latin Vulgate edition of the Bible, c. 383, was instrumental in the fixation of the canon in the West. In 405, Pope Innocent I sent a list of the sacred books to a Gallic bishop, Exsuperius of Toulouse. When these bishops and councils spoke on the matter, however, they were not defining something new, but instead "were ratifying what had already become the mind of the church." Thus, from the 5th century onward, the Western Church was unanimous concerning the New Testament canon.

The last book to be accepted universally was the Book of Revelation. However, with time all the Eastern Church also agreed. Thus, by the 5th century, both the Western and Eastern churches had come into agreement on the matter of the New Testament canon.

- The Council of Trent of 1546 reaffirmed that finalization for Catholicism in the wake of the Protestant Reformation.
- The Thirty-Nine Articles of 1563 for the Church of England and the Westminster Confession of Faith of 1647 for English presbyterians established the official finalizations for those new branches of Christianity in light of the Reformed faith.
- The Synod of Jerusalem of 1672 made no changes to the New Testament canon for any Orthodox, but resolved some questions about some of the minor Old Testament books for the Greek Orthodox and most other Orthodox jurisdictions (who chose to accept it).

== Early collections ==
Writings attributed to the apostles circulated among the earliest Christian communities. The Pauline epistles were circulating, perhaps in collected forms, by the end of the 1st century AD. (Note: Three forms are postulated, from Gamble, Harry Y, "18", The Canon Debate, p. 300, note 21, "(1) Marcion's collection that begins with Galatians and ends with Philemon; (2) Papyrus 46, dated about 200, that follows the order that became established except for reversing Ephesians and Galatians; and (3) the letters to seven churches, treating those to the same church as one letter and basing the order on length, so that Corinthians is first and Colossians (perhaps including Philemon) is last.") Justin Martyr, in the mid 2nd century, mentions "memoirs of the apostles" as being read on "the day called that of the sun" (Sunday) alongside the "writings of the prophets." A defined set of four gospels (the Tetramorph) was asserted by Irenaeus, c. 180, who refers to it directly.

By the early 3rd century, Origen may have been using the same twenty-seven books as in the present New Testament canon, though there were still disputes over the acceptance of the Letter to the Hebrews, James, II Peter, II John, III John, Jude and Revelation, known as the Antilegomena. Likewise, the Muratorian fragment is evidence that perhaps as early as 200, there existed a set of Christian writings somewhat similar to the twenty-seven book NT canon, which included four gospels and argued against objections to them. Thus, while there was a good measure of debate in the Early Church over the New Testament canon, the major writings are claimed to have been accepted by almost all Christians by the middle of the 3rd century.

In his Easter letter of 367, Athanasius, Bishop of Alexandria, gave a list of the books that form the modern twenty-seven-book canon under the name "New Testament", and was the first to use the word "canonized" (Ancient Greek: κανονιζόμενα kanonizomena) in regard to them. The first council that accepted the present canon of the New Testament may have been the Synod of Hippo Regius in North Africa (393). A brief summary of the acts was read at and accepted by the Councils of Carthage in 397 and 419. These councils were under the authority of St. Augustine, who regarded the canon as already closed. Pope Damasus I's Council of Rome in 382, if the Decretum Gelasianum is correctly associated with it, issued a biblical canon identical to that mentioned above, or, if not, the list is at least a 6th-century compilation. Likewise, Damasus' commissioning of the Latin Vulgate edition of the Bible, c. 383, was instrumental in the fixation of the canon in the West. In c. 405, Pope Innocent I sent a list of the sacred books to a Gallic bishop, Exsuperius of Toulouse. Christian scholars assert that, when these bishops and councils spoke on the matter, however, they were not defining something new but instead "were ratifying what had already become the mind of the Church."

Thus, some claim that, from the 4th century, there existed unanimity in the West concerning the New Testament canon, and that, by the 5th century, the Eastern Church, with a few exceptions, had come to accept the Book of Revelation and thus had come into harmony on the matter of the canon.

Full dogmatic articulations of the canon were not made until the Canon of Trent of 1546 for Roman Catholicism, the Gallic Confession of Faith of 1559 for Calvinism, the Thirty-Nine Articles of 1563 for the Church of England, and the Synod of Jerusalem of 1672 for the Greek Orthodox.

Martin Luther made his own canon, relegating without numbers various "disputed" New Testament books that did not meet his criteria to a section sometimes marked "Apocrypha" at the end of the Bible (German: die Apokryphen) after the "true and certain chief books": these were Hebrews, James, Jude and Revelation.

=== Comparison between earliest biblical lists ===
Books	Marcionite canon	Muratorian fragment	Origen	Cyril of Jerusalem	Athanasius' Easter letter and Modern	Syriac Peshitta	Gothic Bible
Composition date	c. 130–140	c. 170	c. 230	c. 350	367	5th Century	4th Century
Matthew	No	Probably	Yes	Yes	Yes	Yes	Yes
Mark	No	Probably	Yes	Yes	Yes	Yes	Yes
Luke	Marcion	Yes	Yes	Yes	Yes	Yes	Yes
John	No	Yes	Yes	Yes	Yes	Yes	Yes
Acts	No	Yes	Yes	Yes	Yes	Yes	Yes
Romans	Yes	Yes	Yes	Yes	Yes	Yes	Yes
1 Corinthians	Yes	Yes	Yes	Yes	Yes	Yes	Yes
2 Corinthians	Yes	Yes	Yes	Yes	Yes	Yes	Yes
Galatians	Yes	Yes	Yes	Yes	Yes	Yes	Yes
Ephesians	Laodiceans	Yes	Yes	Yes	Yes	Yes	Yes
Philippians	Yes	Yes	Yes	Yes	Yes	Yes	Yes
Colossians	Yes	Yes	Yes	Yes	Yes	Yes	Yes
1 Thessalonians	Yes	Yes	Yes	Yes	Yes	Yes	Yes
2 Thessalonians	Yes	Yes	Yes	Yes	Yes	Yes	Yes
1 Timothy	No	Yes	Yes	Yes	Yes	Yes	Yes
2 Timothy	No	Yes	Yes	Yes	Yes	Yes	Yes
Titus	No	Yes	Yes	Yes	Yes	Yes	Yes
Philemon	Yes	Yes	Yes	Yes	Yes	Yes	Yes
Hebrews	No	No	Yes	Yes	Yes	Yes	
James	No	No	Yes	Yes	Yes	Yes	
1 Peter	No	No	Yes	Yes	Yes	Yes	
2 Peter	No	No	Yes	Yes	Yes	No	
1 John	No	Probably	Yes	Yes	Yes	Yes	
2 John	No	Maybe	Maybe	Yes	Yes	No	
3 John	No	Maybe	Maybe	Yes	Yes	No	
Jude	No	Yes	Yes	Yes	Yes	No	
Revelation	No	Yes	Maybe	No (Secondary Rank)	Yes	No	
1 Clement	No	No	No	No	No	No	
2 Clement	No	No	No	No	No	No	
Shepherd of Hermas	No	No	No	No	No	No	
Epistle of Barnabas	No	No	No	No	No	No	
Apocalypse of Peter	No	Yes	No	No	No	No	
Book of Wisdom	No	Yes	No	No	No	No	

=== Comparison between earliest extant codexes ===
Not all codexes were intended to contain complete New Testaments.

Books	Codex Vaticanus	Codex Sinaiticus	Codex Alexandrinus	Codex Ephraemi Rescriptus	Palimpsest Uncial 048	Codex Washingtonianus and Codex Freerianus fragments	Earliest Vetus Latina codex fragments
Composition date	c. 300–325	c. 330–360	c. 400–440	c. 450	5th Century	5th Century	c. 350-550
Matthew	Yes	Yes	Yes	Yes		Partial (W)	Yes
Mark	Yes	Yes	Yes	Yes		Partial (W)	Yes
Luke	Yes	Yes	Yes	Yes		Partial (W)	Yes
John	Yes	Yes	Yes	Yes		Partial (W)	Yes
Acts	Yes	Yes	Yes	Yes	Partial	Partial (W)	Yes
Romans	Yes	Yes	Yes	Yes	Partial		Yes
1 Corinthians	Yes	Yes	Yes	Yes	Partial	Partial	Yes
2 Corinthians	Yes	Yes	Yes	Yes	Partial	Partial	Yes
Galatians	Yes	Yes	Yes	Yes		Partial	Yes
Ephesians	Yes	Yes	Yes	Yes	Partial	Partial	Yes
Philippians	Yes	Yes	Yes	Yes	Partial	Partial	Yes
Colossians	Yes	Yes	Yes	Yes	Partial	Partial	Yes
1 Thessalonians	Yes	Yes	Yes	Yes	Partial	Partial	Yes
2 Thessalonians	Yes	Yes	Yes	Maybe		Partial	Yes
1 Timothy	No	Yes	Yes	Yes	Partial	Partial	Yes
2 Timothy	No	Yes	Yes	Yes	Partial	Partial	Yes
Titus	No	Yes	Yes	Yes	Partial	Partial	Yes
Philemon	No	Yes	Yes	Yes	Yes	Partial	Yes
Hebrews	Yes	Yes	Yes	Yes	Partial	Partial	Yes
James	Yes	Yes	Yes	Yes	Partial		
1 Peter	Yes	Yes	Yes	Yes	Partial		Yes
2 Peter	Yes	Yes	Yes	Yes	Partial		Yes
1 John	Yes	Yes	Yes	Yes	Partial		Yes
2 John	Yes	Yes	Yes	Maybe	Yes		
3 John	Yes	Yes	Yes	Yes	Yes		
Jude	Yes	Yes	Yes	Yes	Partial		
Revelation	No	Yes	Yes	Yes			Yes
1 Clement	No	No	Yes	No			
2 Clement	No	No	Yes	No			
Shepherd of Hermas	No	Yes	No	No			
Epistle of Barnabas	No	Yes	No	No			
Apocalypse of Peter	No	No	No	No			
Book of Wisdom	No	No	No	No			

== Early Christianity (c. 30–325) ==
=== Clement of Rome ===
By the end of the 1st century, some of Paul's letters were known to Clement of Rome (fl. 96), together with some form of the "words of Jesus"; but while Clement valued these highly, he did not refer to them as "Scripture" ("graphe"), a term he reserved for the Septuagint. Metzger 1987 draws the following conclusion about Clement:

Clement... makes occasional reference to certain words of Jesus; though they are authoritative for him, he does not appear to enquire how their authenticity is ensured. In two of the three instances that he speaks of remembering 'the words' of Christ or of the Lord Jesus, it seems that he has a written record in mind, but he does not call it a 'gospel'. He knows several of Paul's epistles, and values them highly for their content; the same can be said of the Epistle to the Hebrews, with which he is well acquainted. Although these writings obviously possess for Clement considerable significance, he never refers to them as authoritative 'Scripture'.

— page 43

=== Marcion of Sinope ===
Marcion of Sinope, a bishop of Asia Minor who went to Rome and was later excommunicated for his views, may have been the first of record to propose a definitive, exclusive, unique list of Christian scriptures, compiled sometime between 130 and 140 AD. Whether his canon was preceded by that of the Church is debated. Though Ignatius did address Christian scripture, before Marcion, against the perceived heresies of the Judaizers and Docetists, he did not define a list of scriptures. In his book Origin of the New Testament Adolf von Harnack argued that Marcion viewed the church at this time as largely an Old Testament church (one that "follows the Testament of the Creator-God") without a firmly established New Testament canon, and that the church gradually formulated its New Testament canon in response to the challenge posed by Marcion.

Marcion rejected the theology of the Old Testament entirely and regarded the God depicted there as an inferior, evil deity. In the Antithesis, he claimed the theology of the Old Testament was incompatible with the teaching of Jesus regarding God and morality.

Marcion created a definite group of books that he regarded as fully authoritative, displacing all others. This comprised ten of the Pauline epistles (without the Pastorals) and a gospel similar to that of Luke. It is uncertain whether he edited these books, purging them of what did not accord with his views, or whether his versions represented a separate textual tradition. (Note: John Knox (the modern writer, not to be confused with John Knox the Protestant Reformer) proposed that Marcion's Gospel may have preceded Luke's Gospel and Acts, although still maintaining that Marcion edited the sources available to him.)

Marcion's gospel, called simply the Gospel of the Lord, differed from the Gospel of Luke by lacking any passages that connected Jesus with the Old Testament. He believed that the god of Israel, Yahweh, who gave the Torah to the Israelites, was an entirely different god from the Supreme God who sent Jesus and inspired the New Testament. Marcion termed his collection of Pauline epistles the Apostolikon. These also differed from the versions accepted by later Christian Orthodoxy.

Marcionite canon (c. 130–140)		Modern canon (c. 4th century)	
Section	Books	Section	Books
Evangelikon	Gospel of Marcion (close resemblance to Gospel of Luke)	Gospels (Euangelia)	Gospel of Matthew; Gospel of Mark; Gospel of Luke; Gospel of John
(nonexistent)	(none)	Acts	Acts of the Apostles
Apostolikon	Galatians; 1 Corinthians; 2 Corinthians; Romans; 1 Thessalonians; 2 Thessalonians; Laodiceans^{1}; Colossians; Philippians; Philemon	Pauline epistles	Romans; 1 Corinthians; 2 Corinthians; Galatians; Ephesians; Philippians; Colossians; 1 Thessalonians; 2 Thessalonians; 1 Timothy; 2 Timothy; Titus; Philemon; Hebrews
(nonexistent)	(none)	Catholic epistles	James; 1 Peter; 2 Peter; 1 John; 2 John; 3 John; Jude
(nonexistent)	(none)	Apocalypses	Apocalypse of John
1. Contents unknown; some scholars equate it with Ephesians.

Marcion's list and theology were rejected as heretical by the early church; however, he forced other Christians to consider which texts were canonical and why. He spread his beliefs widely; they became known as Marcionism. In the introduction to his book Early Christian Writings, Henry Wace stated:

A modern divine... could not refuse to discuss the question raised by Marcion, whether there is such opposition between different parts of what he regards as the word of God, that all cannot come from the same author.

Ferguson 2002 quotes Tertullian's De praescriptione haereticorum 30:

Since Marcion separated the New Testament from the Old, he is necessarily subsequent to that which he separated, inasmuch as it was only in his power to separate what was previously united. Having been united previous to its separation, the fact of its subsequent separation proves the subsequence also of the man who effected the separation.

Note 61 of page 308 adds:

[Wolfram] Kinzig suggests that it was Marcion who usually called his Bible testamentum [Latin for testament].

Other scholars propose that it was Melito of Sardis who originally coined the phrase Old Testament, which is associated with Supersessionism.

Robert M. Price argues that the evidence that the early church fathers, such as Clement, Ignatius, and Polycarp, knew of the Pauline epistles is unclear, and concludes that Marcion was the first person to collect Paul's writings to various churches and to treat ten Pauline letters, some of them Marcion's own compositions, together with an earlier version of Luke (not the Gospel of Luke as now known):

But the first collector of the Pauline Epistles had been Marcion. No one else we know of would be a good candidate, certainly not the essentially fictive Luke, Timothy, and Onesimus. And Marcion, as Burkitt and Bauer show, fills the bill perfectly.

=== Justin Martyr ===
In the mid-2nd century, Justin Martyr (whose writings span the period from c. 145 to 163) mentions the "memoirs of the apostles", which Christians called "gospels" and which were regarded as on par with the Old Testament. Scholars are divided on whether there is any evidence that Justin included the Gospel of John among the "memoirs of the apostles", or whether, on the contrary, he based his doctrine of the Logos on it. Justin quotes the Letters of Paul, 1 Peter, and Acts in his writings.

In Justin's works, distinct references are found to Romans, 1 Corinthians, Galatians, Ephesians, Colossians, and 2 Thessalonians, and possible ones to Philippians, Titus, and 1 Timothy. In addition, he refers to an account from an unnamed source of the baptism of Jesus which differs from that provided by the synoptic gospels:

When Jesus went down in the water, fire was kindled in the Jordan; and when he came up from the water, the Holy Spirit came upon him. The apostles of our Christ wrote this.

=== Tatian ===
Tatian was converted to Christianity by Justin Martyr on a visit to Rome c. 150 and returned to Syria in 172 to reform the church there.

=== Irenaeus ===
Irenaeus of Lyon referred directly to a defined set of four gospels (the Tetramorph), c. 180. In his central work, Adversus Haereses Irenaeus denounced various early Christian groups that used only one gospel, such as Marcionism which used only Marcion's version of Luke, or the Ebionites which seem to have used an Aramaic version of Matthew, as well as groups that used more than four gospels, such as the Valentinians (A.H. 1.11).

Based on the arguments Irenaeus made in support of only four authentic gospels, some interpreters deduce that the fourfold Gospel must have still been a novelty in Irenaeus's time. Against Heresies 3.11.7 acknowledges that many heterodox Christians use only one gospel while 3.11.9 acknowledges that some use more than four. The success of Tatian's Diatessaron in about the same time period is "...a powerful indication that the fourfold Gospel contemporaneously sponsored by Irenaeus was not broadly, let alone universally, recognized."

Irenaeus apparently quotes from 21 of the New Testament books and names the author he thought wrote the text. He mentions the four gospels, Acts, the Pauline epistles with the exception of Hebrews and Philemon, as well as the first epistle of Peter, and the first and second epistles of John, and the book of Revelation. (Note: * Matthew (Book 3, Chapter 16): Mark (Book 3, Chapter 10); Luke (Book 3, Chapter 14); John (Book 3, Chapter 11); Acts of the Apostles (Book 3, Chapter 14); Romans (Book 3, Chapter 16); 1 Corinthians (Book 1, Chapter 3); 2 Corinthians (Book 3, Chapter 7); Galatians (Book 3, Chapter 22); Ephesians (Book 5, Chapter 2); Philippians (Book 4, Chapter 18); Colossians (Book 1, Chapter 3); 1 Thessalonians (Book 5, Chapter 6); 2 Thessalonians (Book 5, Chapter 25); 1 Timothy (Book 1, Preface); 2 Timothy (Book 3, Chapter 14); Titus (Book 3, Chapter 3); 1 Peter (Book 4, Chapter 9); 1 John(Book 3, Chapter 16); 2 John (Book 1, Chapter 16); Revelation to John (Book 4, Chapter 20)) Irenaeus argued that it was illogical to reject Acts of the Apostles but accept the Gospel of Luke, as both were from the same author; in Against Heresies 3.12.12 he ridiculed those who think they are wiser than the Apostles because the Apostles were still under Jewish influence. He may also refer to Hebrews (Book 2, Chapter 30) and James (Book 4, Chapter 16) and maybe even 2 Peter (Book 5, Chapter 28) but does not cite Philemon, 3 John or Jude.

He does think that the letter to the Corinthians, known now as 1 Clement, was of great worth but does not seem to believe that Clement of Rome was the one author (Book 3, Chapter 3, Verse 3) and seems to have the same lower status as Polycarp's Epistle (Book 3, Chapter 3, Verse 3). He does refer to a passage in the Shepherd of Hermas as scripture (Mandate 1 or First Commandment), but this has some consistency problems on his part.

=== Early proto-Orthodox definition attempts ===
In the late 4th century Epiphanius of Salamis (died 402) Panarion 29 says the Nazarenes had rejected the Pauline epistles and Irenaeus Against Heresies 26.2 says the Ebionites rejected him.

Acts 21:21 records a rumor that Paul aimed to subvert the Old Testament (against this rumor see Romans 3:8, 3:31).

2 Peter 3:16 says his letters have been abused by heretics who twist them around "as they do with the other scriptures."

In the 2nd and 3rd centuries Eusebius's Ecclesiastical History 6.38 says the Elchasai "made use of texts from every part of the Old Testament and the Gospels; it rejects the Apostle (Paul) entirely"; 4.29.5 says Tatian the Assyrian rejected the Letters of Paul and Acts of the Apostles; 6.25 says Origen accepted 22 canonical books of the Hebrews plus Maccabees plus the four Gospels, one epistle of Peter "perhaps also a second, but this is doubtful," the apocalypse of John, by John an "epistle of very few lines; perhaps also a second and third", and the epistles of Paul who "did not so much as write to all the churches that he taught; and even to those to which he wrote he sent but a few lines." In all, Origen's canon is suggested to be identical to that of Athanasius.

Marcion may have been the first to have a clearly defined list of New Testament books, though this question of who came first is still debated. The compilation of this list could have been a challenge and incentive to emerging Proto-orthodoxy; if they wished to deny that Marcion's list was the true one, it was incumbent on them to define what the true one was. The expansion phase of the New Testament canon thus could have begun in response to Marcion's proposed limited canon.

=== Muratorian fragment ===
The Muratorian fragment is the earliest known example of a defined list of mostly New Testament books. It survives, damaged and thus incomplete, as a bad Latin translation of an original, no longer extant, Greek text that is usually dated in the late 2nd century, although a few scholars have preferred a 4th-century date. This is an excerpt from Metzger's translation:

The third book of the Gospel is that according to Luke... The fourth... is that of John... the acts of all the apostles... As for the Epistles of Paul... To the Corinthians first, to the Ephesians second, to the Philippians third, to the Colossians fourth, to the Galatians fifth, to the Thessalonians sixth, to the Romans seventh... once more to the Corinthians and to the Thessalonians... one to Philemon, one to Titus, and two to Timothy... to the Laodiceans, [and] another to the Alexandrians, [both] forged in Paul's name to [further] the heresy of Marcion... the epistle of Jude and two of the above-mentioned (or, bearing the name of) John... and [the book of] Wisdom... We receive only the apocalypses of John and Peter, though some of us are not willing that the latter be read in church. But Hermas wrote the Shepherd very recently... And therefore it ought indeed to be read; but it cannot be read publicly to the people in church.

This is evidence that, perhaps as early as 200, there existed a set of Christian writings somewhat similar to what is now the 27-book NT, which included four gospels and argued against objections to them.

=== Alogi ===
There were those who rejected the Gospel of John (and possibly also Revelation and the Epistles of John) as either not apostolic or as written by the Gnostic Cerinthus or as not compatible with the Synoptic Gospels. Epiphanius of Salamis called these people the Alogi, because they rejected the Logos doctrine of John and because he claimed they were illogical. There may have also been a dispute over the doctrine of the Paraclete. Gaius or Caius, presbyter of Rome (early 3rd century), was apparently associated with this movement.

=== Origen ===
It has recently been suggested that Origen (c. 184 – c. 253) has an identical or nearly identical canon to that of Athanasius in 367. Origen writes in his Homilies on Joshua:

Matthew first sounded the priestly trumpet in his Gospel; Mark also; Luke and John each played their own priestly trumpets. Even Peter cries out with trumpets in two of his epistles; also James and Jude. In addition, John also sounds the trumpet through his epistles, and Luke, as he describes the Acts of the Apostles. And now that last one comes, the one who said, 'I think God displays us apostles last' [1 Cor 4:9], and in fourteen of his epistles, thundering with trumpets, he casts down the walls of Jericho and all the devices of idolatry and dogmas of philosophers, all the way to the foundations.

The list does not specify Revelation, but Origen elsewhere expresses confidence in the canonicity of Revelation. The list also does not specify the number of Johannine epistles as three.

== Period of the Seven Ecumenical Councils (325–787) ==
=== Eusebius ===
Eusebius, in his Church History (c. 330), mentioned the books of New Testament according to him:

1. [...] it is proper to sum up the writings of the New Testament which have been already mentioned. First then must be put the holy quaternion of the Gospels; following them the Acts of the Apostles... the epistles of Paul... the epistle of John... the epistle of Peter... After them is to be placed, if it really seem proper, the Apocalypse of John, concerning which we shall give the different opinions at the proper time. These then belong among the accepted writings [Homologoumena].

3. Among the disputed writings [Antilegomena], which are nevertheless recognized by many, are extant the so-called epistle of James and that of Jude, also the second epistle of Peter, and those that are called the second and third of John, whether they belong to the evangelist or to another person of the same name.

4. Among the rejected [Kirsopp. Lake translation: "not genuine"] writings must be reckoned also the Acts of Paul, and the so-called Shepherd, and the Apocalypse of Peter, and in addition to these the extant epistle of Barnabas, and the so-called Teachings of the Apostles; and besides, as I said, the Apocalypse of John, if it seem proper, which some, as I said, reject, but which others class with the accepted books.

5. And among these some have placed also the Gospel according to the Hebrews... And all these may be reckoned among the disputed books... such books as the Gospels of Peter, of Thomas, of Matthias, or of any others besides them, and the Acts of Andrew and John and the other apostles ... they clearly show themselves to be the fictions of heretics. Wherefore they are not to be placed even among the rejected writings, but are all of them to be cast aside as absurd and impious.

The Apocalypse of John, also called Revelation, is counted as both accepted (Kirsopp. Lake translation: "Recognized") and disputed, which has caused some confusion over what exactly Eusebius meant by doing so. The disputation perhaps attributed to Origen (see also Pamphili c. 330, 3.24.17–18). Pamphili c. 330, 3.3.5 adds further detail on Paul: "Paul's fourteen epistles are well known and undisputed. It is not indeed right to overlook the fact that some have rejected the Epistle to the Hebrews, saying that it is disputed by the Church of Rome, on the ground that it was not written by Paul." Pamphili c. 330, 4.29.6 mentions the Diatessaron: "But their original founder, Tatian, formed a certain combination and collection of the Gospels, I know not how, to which he gave the title Diatessaron, and which is still in the hands of some. But they say that he ventured to paraphrase certain words of the apostle [Paul], in order to improve their style."

=== Codex Claromontanus ===
The Codex Claromontanus , c. 303–67, a page found inserted into a 6th-century copy of the Epistles of Paul and Hebrews, has the Old Testament, including Tobit, Judith, Wisdom, Sirach, 1–2,4 Maccabees, and the New Testament, plus Acts of Paul, Apocalypse of Peter, Barnabas, and Hermas, but missing Philippians, 1–2 Thessalonians, and Hebrews.

Zahn and Harnack were of the opinion that the list had been drawn up originally in Greek at Alexandria or its neighborhood ~300 AD. According to Jülicher the list belongs to the 4th century and is probably of western origin.

=== Constantine the Great ===
In 331, Constantine I commissioned Eusebius to deliver fifty Bibles for the Church of Constantinople. Athanasius (Apol. Const. 4) recorded Alexandrian scribes c. 340 preparing Bibles for Constans. Little else is known, though there is plenty of speculation. For example, it is speculated that this may have provided motivation for canon lists, and that Codex Vaticanus and Codex Sinaiticus may be examples of these Bibles. Together with the Peshitta and Codex Alexandrinus, these are the earliest extant Christian Bibles.

=== Cyril of Jerusalem ===
Cyril of Jerusalem (c. 350) listed the modern New Testament (counting the Epistle to the Hebrews as a writing of Paul) except the Book of Revelation, which would belong to a secondary rank.

Then of the New Testament there are four Gospels only, for the rest have false titles and are harmful. The Manicheans also wrote a Gospel according to Thomas, which being smeared with the fragrance of the name 'Gospel' destroys the souls of those who are rather simple-minded. Receive also the Acts of the Twelve Apostles; and in addition to these the seven Catholic Epistles of James, Peter, John, and Jude; and as a seal upon them all, and the latest work of disciples, the fourteen Epistles of Paul.
But let all the rest be put aside in a secondary rank. And whatever books are not read in the churches, do not read these even by yourself, as you have already heard [me say concerning the Old Testament apocrypha].

— Cyril of Jerusalem, Catechetical Lectures 4.36

=== Council of Laodicea ===
The Council of Laodicea, c. 363, was one of the first councils that set out to judge which books were to be read aloud in churches. The decrees issued by the thirty or so clerics attending were called canons. Canon 59 decreed that only canonical books should be read, but no list was appended in the Latin and Syriac manuscripts recording the decrees. The list of canonical books, Canon 60, sometimes attributed to the Council of Laodicea is a later addition according to most scholars and has a 22-book OT and 26-book NT (excludes Revelation).

=== Athanasius ===
In his Easter letter of 367, Athanasius, Bishop of Alexandria, gave a list of exactly the same books as what would become the 27-book NT canon, and he used the word "canonized" (Ancient Greek: κανονιζόμενα kanonizomena) in regard to them. This is the earliest known list which unambiguously enumerates all books present in the modern canon, though the order differs in that it includes the Pauline epistles last among the letters rather than first.

Athanasius distinguishes between divinely-inspired canonical books, non-canonical books that can still useful for instruction, and "apocryphal" books that ought to be rejected.

=== Cheltenham/Mommsen List ===
The Cheltenham List, c. 365–90, is a Latin list discovered by the German classical scholar Theodor Mommsen (published 1886) in a 10th-century manuscript (chiefly patristic) belonging to the library of Thomas Phillips at Cheltenham, England. The list probably originated in North Africa soon after the middle of the 4th century.

It has a 24-book Old Testament and 24-book New Testament which provides syllable and line counts but omits Jude and James, and perhaps Hebrews, and seems to question the epistles of John and Peter beyond the first.

=== Epiphanius ===
McDonald & Sanders 2002, Appendix D-2, writes the following list for Epiphanius of Salamis (c. 374–77), from his Panarion 76.5:

Gospels (4), Paul's epistles (13), Acts, James, Peter, 1–3 John, Jude, Rev, Wisdom, Sirach

=== Apostolic Canon #85 ===
In c. 380, the redactor of the Apostolic Constitutions attributed a canon to the Twelve Apostles themselves as the 85th of his list of such apostolic decrees:

Canon 85. Let the following books be esteemed venerable and holy by all of you, both clergy and laity. [A list of books of the Old Testament ...] And our sacred books, that is, of the New Testament, are the four Gospels, of Matthew, Mark, Luke, John; the fourteen Epistles of Paul; two Epistles of Peter; three of John; one of James; one of Jude; two Epistles of Clement; and the Constitutions dedicated to you, the bishops, by me, Clement, in eight books, which is not appropriate to make public before all, because of the mysteries contained in them; and the Acts of us, the Apostles.—(From the Latin version.)

It is said that the Coptic translation and some Arabic versions include Revelation.

=== Amphilochius of Iconium ===
Bishop Amphilochius of Iconium, in his poem Iambics for Seleucus written some time after 394, discusses debate over the inclusion of a number of books that should be received, and seems uncertain about the later Epistles of Peter and John, Jude, and Revelation.

=== Pope Damasus I ===
Pope Damasus's commissioning of the Latin Vulgate edition of the Bible to Jerome, c. 383, was instrumental in the fixation of the canon in the West. Pope Damasus I is often considered to be the father of the Catholic canon, since what is thought as his list corresponds to the current Catholic canon. Purporting to date from a "Council of Rome" under Pope Damasus I in 382, the so-called "Damasian list" which some attributed to the Decretum Gelasianum gives a list identical to what would be the Canon of Trent, and, though the text may in fact not be Damasian, it is at least a valuable 6th century compilation.

This list, given below, was purportedly endorsed by Pope Damasus I:

[A list of books of the Old Testament ...], and in the New Testament: 4 books of Gospels, 1 book of Acts of the Apostles, 13 letters of the Apostle Paul, 1 of him to the Hebrews, 2 of Peter, 3 of John, 1 of James, 1 of Jude, and the Apocalypse of John.

The so-called Decretum Gelasianum de libris recipiendis et non recipiendis, is traditionally attributed to Pope Gelasius I, bishop of Rome 492–496 AD. However, upon the whole, it is probably of South Gallic origin (6th century), but several parts can be traced back to Pope Damasus and reflect Roman tradition. The 2nd part is a canon catalogue, and the 5th part is a catalogue of apocryphal writings which are to be rejected. The canon catalogue gives all 27 books of the Catholic New Testament.

=== Jerome ===
McDonald & Sanders 2002, Appendix D-2, lists the following New Testament books according to Jerome, (c. 394), from his Epistle 53:

"Lord's Four": Matt, Mark, Luke, John, Paul's Epistles (14), 1–2 Peter, 1–3 John, Jude, James, Acts, Rev.

=== Augustine and the North African councils ===
Augustine of Hippo declared that one is to "prefer those that are received by all Catholic Churches to those which some of them do not receive. Among those, again, which are not received by all, he will prefer such as have the sanction of the greater number and those of greater authority, to such as are held by the smaller number and those of less authority." (On Christian Doctrines 2.12, chapter 8).

The first council that accepted the present canon of the books of the New Testament may have been the Synod of Hippo in North Africa (393). A brief summary of the acts was read at and accepted by the Synod of Carthage (397) and Council of Carthage (419). These councils were convened under the authority of St. Augustine, who regarded the canon as already closed. This North African canon was reaffirmed at the Council of Trent of 1546.

=== Pope Innocent I ===
In c. 405, Pope Innocent I sent a list of the sacred books to a Gallic bishop, Exsuperius of Toulouse, identical with that of Trent. It states "fourteen" Epistles of Paul, but F.F. Bruce prefers "thirteen" excluding the Hebrews. According to the Catholic Encyclopedia, by the turn of the 5th century, the Western Church under Pope Innocent I recognized a biblical canon including the four gospels of Matthew, Mark, Luke, and John, which was previously established at a number of regional Synods, namely the Council of Rome (382), the Synod of Hippo (393), and two Councils of Carthage (397 and 419).

=== Eastern canons ===
The Eastern Churches had, in general, a weaker feeling than those in the West for the necessity of making a sharp delineation with regard to the canon. They were more conscious of the gradation of spiritual quality among the books that they accepted (e.g. the classification of Eusebius, see also Antilegomena) and were less often disposed to assert that the books which they rejected possessed no spiritual quality at all. Similarly, the New Testament canons of the Syriac, Armenian, Georgian, Egyptian Coptic and Ethiopian Churches all have minor differences.

== Outside the Empire ==
=== Syriac Canon ===
In the 4th century, the Doctrine of Addai lists a 17-book NT canon using the Diatessaron and Acts and 15 Pauline epistles (including 3rd Corinthians). The Syriac Doctrine of Addai (c. 400) claims to record the oldest traditions of the Syriac Christianity, and among these is the establishment of a canon: members of the church are to read only the Gospel (meaning the Diatessaron of Tatian), the Epistles of Paul (which are said to have been sent by Peter, from Rome), and the Book of Acts (which is said to have been sent by John the son of Zebedee, from Ephesus), and nothing else.

By the 5th century, the Syriac Bible, called the Peshitta, was formalized, accepting Philemon, along with James, 1 Peter and 1 John, but excluding 2 John, 3 John, 2 Peter, Jude and Revelation. After the Council of Ephesus, the Church of the East became separated, and retained this canon of only 22-books (the Peshitta) up to the present day. The Syriac Orthodox Church uses this text as well (known in the West Syriac dialect as the Peshitto), but with the addition of the other books normally present in the New Testament canon.

The late-5th or early-6th century Peshitta of the Syriac Orthodox Church includes a 22-book NT, excluding II Peter, II John, III John, Jude, and Revelation. The Lee Peshitta of 1823 follows the Protestant canon.

McDonald & Sanders 2002, Appendix D-2, lists the following Syrian catalogue of St. Catherine's, c. 400:

Gospels (4): Matt, Mark, Luke, John, Acts, Gal, Rom, Heb, Col, Eph, Phil, 1–2 Thess, 1–2 Tim, Titus, Phlm.

The Syriac Peshitta, used by all the various Syriac Churches, originally did not include 2 Peter, 2 John, 3 John, Jude and Revelation (and this canon of 22 books is the one cited by John Chrysostom (~347–407) and Theodoret (393–466) from the School of Antioch). It also includes Psalm 151 and Psalm 152–155 and 2 Baruch. Western Syrians have added the remaining 5 books to their NT canons in modern times (such as the Lee Peshitta of 1823). Today, the official lectionaries followed by the Malankara Syrian Orthodox Church, with headquarters at Kottayam (India), and the Chaldean Syrian Church, also known as the Church of the East (Nestorian), with headquarters at Trichur (India), still present lessons from only the 22-books of the original Peshitta.

=== Armenian canon ===
The Armenian Bible introduces one addition: a third letter to the Corinthians, also found in the Acts of Paul, which became canonized in the Armenian Church, but is not part of the Armenian Bible today. The Book of Revelation was not accepted into the Armenian Bible until c. 1200 AD when Archbishop Nerses arranged an Armenian Synod at Constantinople to introduce the text. Still, there were unsuccessful attempts even as late as 1290 AD to include in the Armenian canon several apocryphal books: Advice of the Mother of God to the Apostles, the Books of Criapos, and the ever-popular Epistle of Barnabas.

The Armenian Apostolic church at times has included the Testaments of the Twelve Patriarchs in its Old Testament and the Third Epistle to the Corinthians, but does not always list them with the other 27 canonical New Testament books.

=== Coptic and Ethiopian canons ===
The canon of the Tewahedo Churches is somewhat looser than for other traditional Christian groups, and the order, naming, and chapter/verse division of some of the books is also slightly different.

The Ethiopian "narrow" canon includes 81 books altogether: The 27 book New Testament; those Old Testament books found in the Septuagint and accepted by the Orthodox; as well as Enoch, Jubilees, 2 Esdras, Rest of the Words of Baruch and 3 books of Meqabyan (these three Ethiopian books of Maccabees are entirely different in content from the four Books of Maccabees known elsewhere).

The "broader" Ethiopian New Testament canon includes four books of "Sinodos" (church practices), two "Books of Covenant", "Ethiopic Clement", and "Ethiopic Didascalia" (Apostolic Church-Ordinances). However, these books have never been printed or widely studied. This "broader" canon is also sometimes said to include, with the Old Testament, an eight-part history of the Jews based on the writings of Flavius Josephus, and known as "Pseudo-Josephus" or "Joseph ben Gurion" (Yosēf walda Koryon).

== Protestant developments (from c. 1517) ==
The Encyclopedia of Theology says that the 27 books which make up the New Testament canon of Scripture are not based on a Scriptural list that authenticates them to be inspired, thus their legitimacy is considered impossible to be distinguished with certainty without appealing to another infallible source, such as the Magisterium of the Catholic Church which first assembled and authenticated this list at the Council of Rome (382). Catholicism considers the Magisterium, i.e. the teaching authority, has equal position and linked together with Sacred Tradition and Sacred Scripture, each acts in its own way for the goodness of the Church. Rejecting these, Protestant reformers focused on the doctrine of sola scriptura, i.e. the supreme authority of Scripture alone. Sola scriptura is one of the five solas, considered by some Protestant groups to be the theological pillars of the Protestant Reformation.

=== Martin Luther ===
Martin Luther was troubled by four books, referred to as Luther's Antilegomena: Jude, James, Hebrews, and Revelation; while he placed them in a secondary position relative to the rest, he did not exclude them. He did propose removing them from the canon, echoing the consensus of several Catholics such as Cardinal Cajetan and Erasmus, and partially because they were perceived to go against certain Protestant doctrines such as sola gratia and sola fide, but this was not generally accepted among his followers. However, these books are ordered last in the German-language Luther Bible to this day. Luther's criterion for what counted as authentic New Testament Scripture was apostolic origin: he held the books which he rejected to have been not been authored by the Apostles or by their contemporaries, but by individuals from a later period.

== Catholic developments (from c. 1546) ==
=== Council of Trent ===
The Council of Trent on April 8, 1546, approved the enforcement of the present Roman Catholic Bible Canon including the Deuterocanonical Books as an article of faith, and the decision was confirmed by an anathema by vote (24 yea, 15 nay, 16 abstain). This is said to be the same list as produced at the Council of Florence (Session 11, 4 February 1442), Augustine's 397-419 Councils of Carthage, and probably Damasus' 382 Council of Rome. Because of its placement, the list was not considered binding for the Catholic Church, and in light of Martin Luther's demands, the Catholic Church examined the question of the Canon again at the Council of Trent, which reaffirmed the canon of previous councils and added the anathema against attempts to change the contents of the canon.

=== Later developments ===
The First Vatican Council on April 24, 1870, approved the additions to Mark (v. 16:9–20), Luke (22:19b–20, 43–44), and John (7:53–8:11), which are not present in early manuscripts but are contained in the Vulgate edition.

Pope Pius XI on June 2, 1927, decreed that the Comma Johanneum was open to investigative scrutiny.

Pope Pius XII on 3 September 1943 issued the encyclical Divino afflante Spiritu, which allowed translations based on texts other than the Latin Vulgate.

In its Dogmatic Constitution on Divine Revelation, Dei Verbum, the Second Vatican Council affirmed that "the Gospels have a special preeminence [in the New Testament], and rightly so", while the remaining parts of canon of the New Testament, including the epistles of St. Paul and other apostolic writings, were "composed under the inspiration of the Holy Spirit, by which, according to the wise plan of God, those matters which concern Christ the Lord are confirmed, His true teaching is more and more fully stated, the saving power of the divine work of Christ is preached, the story is told of the beginnings of the Church and its marvelous growth, and its glorious fulfillment is foretold".

== Orthodox developments (from c. 1672) ==
=== Synod of Jerusalem ===
The Synod of Jerusalem in 1672 decreed the Greek Orthodox Canon which is similar to the one decided by the Council of Trent. They "call[ed] Sacred Scripture all those [books] which Cyril collected from the Synod of Laodicea, and enumerated, adding to Scripture those which he foolishly and ignorantly, or rather maliciously, called Apocrypha; specifically, [List of deuterocanonical books...]."

This was simply an affirmation of tradition, not a new canonization. As the Confession goes on to state, "ancient custom, or rather the Catholic Church, which has delivered to us as genuine the Sacred Gospels and the other Books of Scripture, has undoubtedly delivered these [deuterocanonical books] also as parts of Scripture.... And if, perhaps, it seems that not always have all of these been considered on the same level as the others, yet nevertheless these also have been counted and reckoned with the rest of Scripture, both by Synods and by many of the most ancient and eminent Theologians of the Catholic Church. All of these we also judge to be Canonical Books, and confess them to be Sacred Scripture..."

== See also ==
- Apostolic Fathers
- Biblical apocrypha
- Biblical canon
- List of early Christian writers
- List of Gospels

== Bibliography ==
=== Primary sources ===
- Augustine, Aurelius, De Civitate Dei [On the City of God] (in Latin)
- Pamphili, Eusebius (c. 330), Schaff, Philip (ed.), Ecclesiastical History, The Christian classics ethereal library.

=== Secondary sources ===
- Ackroyd, PR; Evans, CF, eds. (1970), The Cambridge History of the Bible, vol. 1, Cambridge University Press.
- Bauckham, Richard (2006), Jesus and the Eyewitnesses, Cambridge: Eerdmans.
- BeDuhn, Jason (2013), The First New Testament. Marcion's Scriptural Canon, Polebridge Press.
- Bourgel, Jonathan, "Do the Synoptic Narratives of the Passion Contain a Stratum Composed in Judea on the Eve of the Great Revolt?", NTS 58 (2012), 503–21, (French).
- Brakke, David (1994), "Canon Formation and Social Conflict in Fourth Century Egypt: Athanasius of Alexandria's Thirty Ninth Festal Letter", Harvard Theological Review, 87 (4): 395–419, doi:10.1017/S0017816000030200, S2CID 161779697.
- Bruce, FF (1988), The Canon of Scripture, Intervarsity Press.
- de Jonge, HJ (2003), "The New Testament Canon", in de Jonge, HJ; Auwers, JM (eds.), The Biblical Canons, Leuven University Press
- Ferguson, Everett (2002), "Factors leading to the Selection and Closure of the New Testament Canon", in McDonald, LM; Sanders, JA (eds.), The Canon Debate, Hendrickson.
- Gamble, Harry (1985), The New Testament Canon. Its Making and Meaning, Fortress Press.
- Kruger, Michael (2012), Canon Revisited. Establishing the Origins and Authority of the New Testament Books, Crossway.
- Kruger, Michael (2013), The Question of Canon. Challenging the Status Quo in the New Testament Debate, InterVarsity Press.
- Lindberg, Carter (2006), A Brief History of Christianity, Blackwell, ISBN 1-4051-1078-3.
- McDonald, L. M.; Sanders, J. A., eds. (2002), The Canon Debate, Hendrickson.
- Metzger, Bruce (1987), The Canon of the New Testament: Its Origins, Development, and Significance, Oxford: Clarendon.
- Metzger, Bruce M. (1997), The Canon of the New Testament: Its Origin, Development, and Significance, Oxford University Press, ISBN 0-19-826954-4.
- Noll, Mark A (1997), Turning Points.Decisive Moments in the History of Christianity, Baker Academic.
