= Canon of Trent =

List of books officially considered canonical at the Council of Trent

The Canon of Trent is the list of books officially considered canonical at the Roman Catholic Council of Trent. A decree, the De Canonicis Scripturis, from the Council's fourth session (of 8 April 1546), issued an anathema on dissenters of the books affirmed in Trent. The Council confirmed an identical list already locally approved in 1442 by the Council of Florence (Session 11, 4 February 1442), which had existed in the earliest canonical lists from the synods of Carthage and Rome in the fourth century.

The list confirmed that the deuterocanonical books were on a par with the other books of the canon (while Luther placed these books in the Apocrypha of his canon) and ended debate on the Antilegomena and coordinated church tradition with the Scriptures as a rule of faith. It also affirmed Jerome's Latin translation, the Vulgate, to be authoritative for the text of Scripture, contrary to Protestant views that the Greek and Hebrew Masoretic texts were more authoritative. Later, on 3 September 1943, Pope Pius XII issued the encyclical Divino afflante Spiritu, which allowed Catholic translations to be based on original manuscripts and recent discoveries and not only on the Latin Vulgate.

== List ==
=== Old Testament ===
Of the Old Testament: the five books of Moses, to wit, Genesis, Exodus, Leviticus, Numbers, Deuteronomy; Josue, Judges, Ruth, four books of Kings, two of Paralipomenon, the first book of Esdras, and the second which is entitled Nehemias; Tobias, Judith, Esther, Job, the Davidical Psalter, consisting of a hundred and fifty psalms; the Proverbs, Ecclesiastes, the Canticle of Canticles, Wisdom, Ecclesiasticus, Isaias, Jeremias, with Baruch; Ezechiel, Daniel; the twelve minor prophets, to wit, Osee, Joel, Amos, Abdias, Jonas, Micheas, Nahum, Habacuc, Sophonias, Aggaeus, Zacharias, Malachias; two books of the Machabees, the first and the second.

=== New Testament ===
Of the New Testament: the four Gospels, according to Matthew, Mark, Luke, and John; the Acts of the Apostles written by Luke the Evangelist; fourteen epistles of Paul the apostle, (one) to the Romans, two to the Corinthians, (one) to the Galatians, to the Ephesians, to the Philippians, to the Colossians, two to the Thessalonians, two to Timothy, (one) to Titus, to Philemon, to the Hebrews; two of Peter the apostle, three of John the apostle [ 1, 2, 3 ], one of the apostle James, one of Jude the apostle, and the Apocalypse of John the apostle.
