= Diotrephes =

Biblical character in the Third Epistle of John

Diotrephes (Greek: Διοτρεφής, romanized: Diotrephēs) was a man mentioned in the Third Epistle of John (verses 9–11). His name means "nourished by Zeus". As scholar Raymond E. Brown comments, "Diotrephes is not a particularly common name."

In addition to being ambitious, proud, disrespectful of apostolic authority, rebellious, and inhospitable, the author of the letter says that Diotrephes tried to hinder those desiring to show hospitality to the brothers and to expel these from the congregation. Not even the location of Diotrephes' church can be determined from the letter.

Adolf von Harnack was of the view that Diotrephes was the earliest monarchical bishop whose name has survived.

== Biblical passage ==
The following is the passage and notes from the New English Translation.

1:9 I wrote something to the church, but Diotrephes, who loves to be first among them, does not acknowledge us. 1:10 Therefore, if I come, I will call attention to the deeds he is doing – the bringing of unjustified charges against us with evil words! And not being content with that, he not only refuses to welcome the brothers himself, but hinders the people who want to do so and throws them out of the church! 1:11 Dear friend, do not imitate what is bad but what is good. The one who does good is of God; the one who does what is bad has not seen God.

== Subsequent references ==
In 1588, the Elizabethan Puritan John Udall wrote a dialogue with a haughty bishop named Diotrephes. Writing anonymously, Udall claimed that his godly and witty protagonist, Paul, was merely cautioning the English bishops to be wary of false counselors, particularly the Catholics from whom they had inherited the structure of English ecclesiology. Although the dialogue's actual title is The state of the Church of Englande, laide open in a conference betweene Diotrephes a byshop, Tertullus a papist, Demetrius an vsurer, Pandocheus an inne-keeper, and Paule a preacher of the worde of God, it is commonly referred to by scholars as Diotrephes.
