= Easter letter =

Christian letters, especially regarding biblical canon

The Festal Letters or Easter Letters are a series of annual letters by which the Bishops of Alexandria, in conformity with a decision of the First Council of Nicaea, announced the date on which Easter was to be celebrated. The council chose Alexandria because of its famous school of astronomy, and the date of Easter depends on the spring equinox and the phases of the moon.

The most famous of those letters are those authored by Athanasius, a collection of which was rediscovered in a Syriac translation in 1842. Festal Letters of other Bishops of Alexandria, including Cyril have also been preserved.

== The 39th Festal Letter of Athanasius ==
Of the 45 Festal Letters of Athanasius, the 39th, written for Easter of AD 367, is of particular interest as it regards the biblical canon.

In this letter, Athanasius lists the books of the Old Testament as 22 in accordance with Jewish tradition. To the books in the Tanakh he includes both the Book of Baruch and the Letter of Jeremiah in the Book of Jeremiah, and omits the Book of Esther, instead distinguishing the Book of Ruth as separate from the Book of Judges.

He lists the books of the New Testament as the familiar 27: the 4 Gospels, the Acts of the Apostles, the 7 General or Catholic epistles (listed in the order in which they appear in modern editions of the New Testament), the 14 Pauline epistles (listed with the Letter to the Hebrews placed between those to the Thessalonians and the Pastoral epistles), and the Book of Revelation. Although the order in which Athanasius places the books is different from what is now usual, his list is the earliest reference to the present canon of the New Testament.

Athanasius reckons the Book of Wisdom, Sirach, the Book of Esther, Judith, the Book of Tobit, the Teaching of the Apostles, and the Shepherd of Hermas not as part of the canon of Scripture, but as books "appointed by the Fathers to be read by those who newly join us, and who wish for instruction in the word of godliness". Despite this distinction, J. Leemans has argued that there is no difference in the way Athanasius uses these books and the way he uses those he designated as in the New Testament. Furthermore, it has been noted that in his other works, Athanasius is comfortable quoting Deuterocanonical books such as Wisdom, Sirach, and Judith, citing them as "Scripture" or "Holy Scripture".

In addition to the books that he calls either canonical or books to be read, he speaks also of books to be rejected, calling them apocrypha, and describes them as "an invention of heretics, who write them when they choose, bestowing upon them their approbation, and assigning to them a date, that so [sic], using them as ancient writings, they may find occasion to lead astray the simple".

== See also ==
- Development of the New Testament canon
