= Antilegomena =

Biblical books whose authenticity or value is disputed

Antilegomena (from Greek ἀντιλεγόμενα, literally "spoken against") are written texts whose authenticity or value is disputed. Eusebius in his Church History (c. 325) used the term for those Christian scriptures that were "disputed", in Early Christianity before the closure of the New Testament canon.

The antilegomena were widely read in the Early Church and included the Epistle of James, the Epistle of Jude, 2 Peter, 2 and 3 John, the Book of Revelation, the Gospel of the Hebrews, the Epistle to the Hebrews, the Apocalypse of Peter, the Acts of Paul, the Shepherd of Hermas, the Epistle of Barnabas and the Didache. There was disagreement in the Early Church on whether or not the respective texts deserved canonical status.

== Eusebius ==
The first major church historian, Eusebius, who wrote his Church History c. AD 325, applied the Greek term antilegomena to the disputed writings of the Early Church:

Among the disputed writings [των αντιλεγομένων], which are nevertheless recognized by many, are extant the so-called epistle of James and that of Jude, also the second epistle of Peter, and those that are called the second and third of John, whether they belong to the evangelist or to another person of the same name. Among the rejected writings must be reckoned also the Acts of Paul, and the so-called Shepherd, and the Apocalypse of Peter, and in addition to these the extant epistle of Barnabas, and the so-called Teachings of the Apostles; and besides, as I said, the Apocalypse of John, if it seem proper, which some, as I said, reject, but which others class with the accepted books. And among these some have placed also the Gospel according to the Hebrews, with which those of the Hebrews that have accepted Christ are especially delighted. And all these may be reckoned among the disputed books [των αντιλεγομένων].

It is a matter of categorical discussion whether Eusebius divides his books into three groups—homologoumena (from Greek ὁμολεγούμενα, "accepted"), antilegomena, and "heretical"—or into four by adding a notha ("spurious") group.

The Epistle to the Hebrews had earlier been listed:

It is not indeed right to overlook the fact that some have rejected the Epistle to the Hebrews, saying that it is disputed [αντιλέγεσθαι] by the Church of Rome, on the ground that it was not written by Paul.

Codex Sinaiticus, a 4th-century text and possibly one of the Fifty Bibles of Constantine, includes the Shepherd of Hermas and the Epistle of Barnabas. The original Peshitta (NT portion is c. 5th century) excluded 2 and 3 John, 2 Peter, Jude, and Revelation. Some modern editions, such as the Lee Peshitta of 1823, include them.

== Reformation ==
During the Reformation, Luther brought up the issue of the antilegomena. Though he included the Letter to the Hebrews, the letters of James and Jude, and Revelation in his Bible translation, he put them into a separate grouping and questioned their legitimacy. Hence, these books are sometimes termed "Luther's Antilegomena" – a terminology that remains in use today. Current Lutheran usage expands this questioning to also include 2 Peter, 2 John, and 3 John.

F. C. Baur used the term in his classification of the Pauline Epistles, classing Romans, 1–2 Corinthians and Galatians as homologoumena; Ephesians, Philippians, Colossians, 1–2 Thessalonians and Philemon as antilegomena; and the Pastoral Epistles as notha (spurious writings).

== Hebrew Bible ==
The term is sometimes applied also to certain books in the Hebrew Bible.

For instance, the Catholic Encyclopedia and discussions from institutions like Knox Theological Seminary have noted that certain Hebrew Bible books were subject to debate, thus fitting the broader definition of antilegomena.

Books such as Ecclesiastes, Esther, Song of Songs, Ezekiel, and Proverbs were among those whose inclusion in the canon was questioned at various times. Reasons for these debates ranged from theological concerns to perceived inconsistencies. For example, Ecclesiastes was seen by some as too skeptical, while Esther was noted for not mentioning God explicitly.

== See also ==
- Development of the Hebrew Bible canon
- Development of the Old Testament canon
- Development of the New Testament canon
- Luther's canon
- Religious text

== Bibliography ==
- Eusebius of Cæsarea (1904) [325], Philip Schaff; Henry Wace (eds.), Church History, The Nicene and Post-Nicene Fathers, Second Series, vol. 1, translated by Arthur Cushman McGiffert.
- Kalin, Everett R (2002), "23: The New Testament Canon of Eusebius", in McDonald; Sanders (eds.), The Canon Debate, pp. 386–404.
- McDonald; Sanders, eds. (2002), The Canon Debate, Peabody, Mass.: Hendrickson.
