= Great uncial codices =

Four oldest surviving Greek Bibles

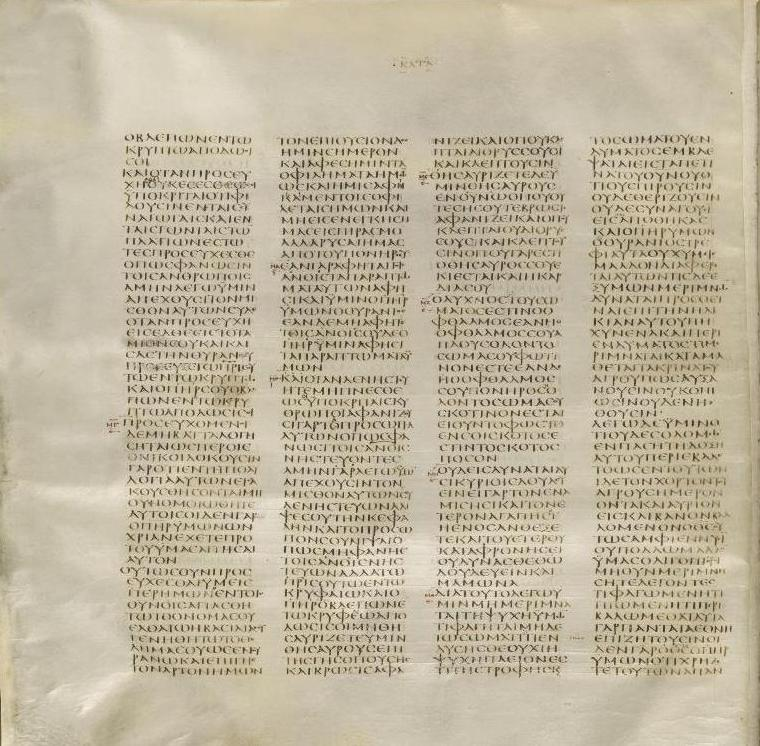
Page from Codex Sinaiticus with text of Matthew 6:4–32

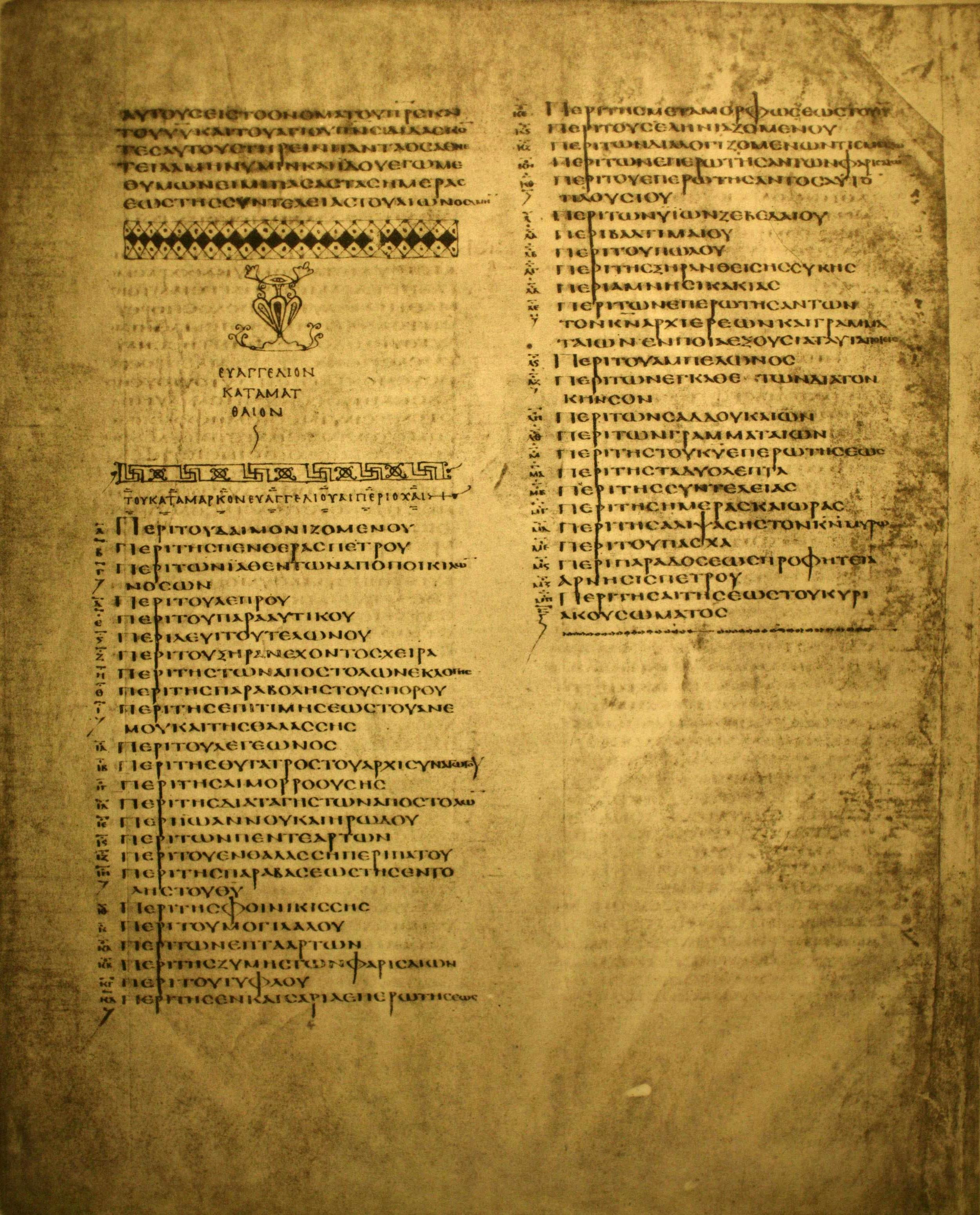
Alexandrinus – Table of κεφάλαια (table of contents) to the Gospel of Mark

The great uncial codices or four great uncials are the only remaining uncial codices that contain (or originally contained) the entire text of the Bible (Old and New Testament) in Greek. They are the Codex Vaticanus in the Vatican Library, the Codex Sinaiticus and the Codex Alexandrinus in the British Library, and the Codex Ephraemi Rescriptus in the Bibliothèque nationale de France in Paris.

Many other fragments exist of approximately 300 Greek New Testament uncial manuscripts on vellum. There are 45 uncials which were given sigla in the Gregory–Aland classification system due to their importance, including all of the great uncials. There are about 140 papyrus Greek New Testament fragments as well. There are old Biblical manuscripts in other languages like Syriac and Latin, but none of them are as old and as important as the oldest uncials, nor are they in the Greek of the New Testament writings.

What sets apart the great uncials are their age, their level of completion, and the opinions of Bible scholars who prefer them over other others, believing them to be closer to the autographs of the authors of the New Testament writings. Their nearly complete texts of the Bible also bears weight on the study of the development of the New Testament canon and how the Old Testament was used in the early Church. Their primary use is in textual criticism of New Testament manuscripts in which scholars study and debate textual variants in the New Testament.

After decades of scholarship in New Testament textual criticism, Kurt Aland and Barbara Aland introduced five categories of New Testament manuscripts in 1981 and placed two of the great uncials completely in Category I, the "manuscripts of a very special quality." Codex Alexandrinus was placed in Category III "manuscripts of a distinctive character" in the Gospels and Category I in the rest of the New Testament. The other, Codex Ephraemi Rescriptus, was placed in Category II, "manuscripts of a special quality" for its entirety.

This places two of the great uncials, Vaticanus and Sinaiticus, in the Alands' method of classification's highest and most important category, shared by only a handful of smaller uncials and a few dozen parchment fragments of this age. The two are often compared with one another due to their relevance.

== Description ==
Only four great codices have survived to the present day: Codex Vaticanus (abbreviated: B), Codex Sinaiticus (א), Codex Alexandrinus (A), and Codex Ephraemi Rescriptus (C). Although discovered at different times and places, they share many similarities. They are written in a certain uncial style of calligraphy using only majuscule letters, written in scriptio continua (meaning without regular gaps between words). Though not entirely absent, there are very few divisions between words in these manuscripts. Words do not necessarily end on the same line on which they start. All these manuscripts were made at great expense of material and labour, written on vellum by professional scribes. They seem to have been based on what were thought to be the most accurate texts of their time.

All of the great uncials had the leaves arranged in quarto form. The size of the leaves is much larger than in papyrus codices:

- B: Codex Vaticanus [03] – 27 × 27 cm (10.6 × 10.6 in); c. A.D. 300–350
- א: Codex Sinaiticus [01] – 38.1 × 34.5 cm (15.0 × 13.6 in); c. 325–360
- A: Codex Alexandrinus [02] – 32 × 26 cm (12.6 × 10.4 in); c. 400–440
- C: Codex Ephraemi [04] – 33 × 27 cm (13.0 × 10.6 in); c. 425-450
- D: In the 19th century, the Codex Bezae [05] (c. ~400), was proposed to be the fifth great uncial. However, in contrast to the original four, it has not been universally accepted, largely due its lack of passages and textual variants, as well as having Western text-type compared to the Alexandrian text-type of the kind preferred by textual criticism scholars. The Alands gave Bezae and similar manuscripts their own Category IV, "Manuscripts of the D text," believing it to be unusual enough as a witness to the Western text type to deserve its own category.

Codex Vaticanus uses the oldest system of textual division in the Gospels. Sinaiticus, Alexandrinus, and Ephraemi have the Ammonian Sections with references to the Eusebian Canons. Codex Alexandrinus and Ephraemi Rescriptus use also a division according to the larger sections – κεφάλαια (kephalaia, chapters). Alexandrinus is the earliest manuscript which uses κεφάλαια. Vaticanus has a more archaic style of writing than the other manuscripts. There is no ornamentation or any larger initial letters in Vaticanus and Sinaiticus, but there is in Alexandrinus. Vaticanus has no introduction to the Book of Psalms, which became a standard after 325 AD, whereas Sinaiticus and Alexandrinus do. The orders of their books differ.

According to Burgon, the peculiar wording in some passages of the five great uncials (א A B C D) shows that they were the byproduct of heresy–a position strongly contested by Daniel B. Wallace.

Alexandrinus was the first of the greater manuscripts to be made accessible to scholars. Ephraemi Rescriptus, a palimpsest, was deciphered by Tischendorf in 1840–1841 and published by him in 1843–1845. Codex Ephraemi has been the neglected member of the family of great uncials.

Sinaiticus was discovered by Tischendorf in 1844 during his visit to Saint Catherine's Monastery in Sinai. The text of the codex was published in 1862. Vaticanus has been housed at the Vatican Library at least since the 15th century, but it became widely available after a photographic facsimile of the entire manuscript was made and published by Giuseppe Cozza-Luzi in 1889–1890 (in three volumes).

It has been speculated that Codex Sinaiticus and Codex Vaticanus were part of a project ordered by Emperor Constantine the Great to produce 50 copies of the Bible.

== See also ==
- Comparison of codices Sinaiticus and Vaticanus
- Codex Alexandrinus
