= Luther's canon =

Biblical canon attributed to Martin Luther

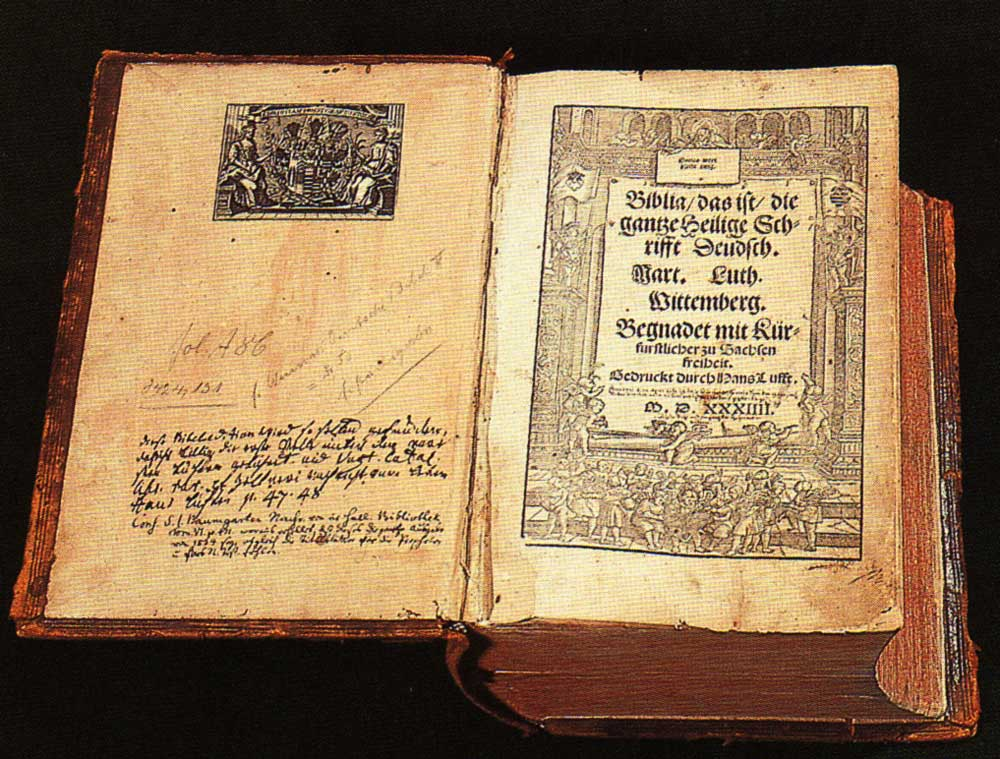
Luther's 1534 Bible

Luther's canon is the biblical canon attributed to Martin Luther, which has influenced Protestants since the 16th-century Protestant Reformation. While the Lutheran Confessions specifically did not define a biblical canon, it is widely regarded as the canon of the Lutheran Church. It differs from the 1546 Roman Catholic canon of the Council of Trent in that it does not accept the deuterocanonical books and questions the authentic origins of seven New Testament books, called "Luther's Antilegomena", four of which are still ordered last in German-language Luther Bibles to this day.

Despite Luther's personal commentary on certain books of the Bible, the actual books included in the Luther Bible that came to be used by the Lutheran Churches do not differ greatly from those in the Catholic Bible, though the Luther Bible places what Catholics view as the deuterocanonical books in an intertestamental section, between the Old Testament and New Testament, terming these as Apocrypha. The books of the Apocrypha, in the Lutheran tradition, are non-canonical, but "worthy of reverence," thus being included in Lutheran lectionaries used during the Divine Service; the Luther Bible is widely used by Anabaptist Christians, such as the Amish, as well.

== Old Testament apocrypha ==
Luther included the deuterocanonical books in his translation of the German Bible, but he did relocate them to after the Old Testament, calling them "Apocrypha, that are books which are not considered equal to the Holy Scriptures, but are useful and good to read." With respect to the Old Testament canon, Luther used the Old Testament canon listed by the early Church Father Jerome.

It is a common misconception that Martin Luther removed certain books from the Bible; rather, "Luther collected the apocryphal books and placed them at the end of the Old Testament, rather than have them interspersed among the other books." While deemed noncanonical, the books of the Apocrypha remained a part of the Lutheran Bible. The Luther Bible influenced the production of Bibles used by the Evangelical-Lutheran Churches worldwide. In the present-day, the official Evangelical-Lutheran Bible translations (such as Bibel 2000) in the Nordic-Baltic region continue to include the Old Testament, Apocrypha, and New Testament.

== New Testament "disputed books": Hebrews, James, Jude, and Revelation ==
In the 4th century the Council of Rome had outlined the 27 New Testament books which now appear in the Catholic canon.

Luther considered Hebrews, James, Jude, and the Revelation to be "disputed books", which he included in his translation but placed separately at the end in his New Testament published in 1522; these books needed to be interpreted subject to the undisputed books, which are called the "canon within a canon." This group of books begins with the book of Hebrews, and in its preface Luther states, "Up to this point we have had to do with the true and certain chief books of the New Testament. The four which follow have from ancient times had a different reputation."

According to some scholars such as Johann Michael Reu, but controversial, Luther did not personally regard these books as canonical: in the September Testament he included them but did not add numbers to them, and in the 1534 Bible he treated them the same as the Old Testament Apocrypha. In the Preface to James of the 1522 September Testament, Luther explicitly stated it was not "apostolic" (which for Luther did not mean being written by the Apostles, but "whatever preaches Christ"):

"I think highly of the epistle of James, and regard it as valuable although it was rejected in early days. It does not expound human doctrines, but lays much emphasis on God's law. [...] I do not hold it to be of apostolic authorship."

Luther goes on to say that it contradicts St Paul and cannot be defended: it teaches "works-righteousness" and does not mention "the Passion, the Resurrection or the Spirit of Christ."

In Luther's preface to the New Testament, Luther ascribed to several books of the New Testament different degrees of doctrinal value:

St. John's Gospel and his first Epistle, St. Paul's Epistles, especially those to the Romans, Galatians, Ephesians, and St. Peter's Epistle—these are the books which show to thee Christ, and teach everything that is necessary and blessed for thee to know, even if you were never to see or hear any other book of doctrine. Therefore, St. James' Epistle is a perfect straw-epistle compared with them, for it has in it nothing of an evangelic kind."

However, in the view of theologian Charles Caldwell Ryrie Luther was comparing (in his opinion) doctrinal value, not canonical validity.

Luther's private antipathy to James continued into the 1530s and 1540s: he added a note to James 2:12 "O this chaos"; in 1540 "Some day I will use James to fire my stove;" (Note: "German: Ich werde ein mal mit dem Jekel den offen hitzen" Weimarer Ausgabe. Tischreden Bd. 5 (1912), S. 382 (IA) apud) in 1542 "The Epistle of James we have thrown out from this school (Wittenberg) because it has no value...I hold it is written by some Jew" (not a Christian.) (Note: Latin: Epistolam Jacobi ejidemus ex hac schola; German: den sie soll nichts...Ich halt, das sie irgendt ein Jude gemacht hatt...)

Theologian Jason Lane has noted "the general perception that Luther could not understand James because the letter failed to fit his conception of Pauline theology."

In response to doubts such as Luther's, the Catholic Church's Council of Trent on April 8, 1546 dogmatically defined the contents of the biblical canon and thus settled the matter for Catholics. This affirmed the canonicity of Hebrews, James, Jude and Revelation, as well as various Deuterocanonical books of the Old Testament.

== Sola fide doctrine ==
In The Protestant Spirit of Luther's Version, Philip Schaff asserts that:

The most important example of dogmatic influence in Luther's version is the famous interpolation of the word alone in Rom. 3:28 (allein durch den Glauben), by which he intended to emphasize his solifidian doctrine of justification, on the plea that the German idiom required the insertion for the sake of clearness. But he thereby brought Paul into direct verbal conflict with James, who says (James 2:24), "by works a man is justified, and not only by faith" ("nicht durch den Glauben allein"). It is well known that Luther deemed it impossible to harmonize the two apostles in this article, and characterized the Epistle of James as an "epistle of straw," because it had no evangelical character ("keine evangelische Art").

Martin Luther's description of the Epistle of James changes. In some cases, Luther argues that it was not written by an apostle; but in other cases, he describes James as the work of an apostle. He even cites it as authoritative teaching from God and describes James as "a good book, because it sets up no doctrines of men but vigorously promulgates the law of God." Lutherans hold that the Epistle is rightly part of the New Testament, citing its authority in the Book of Concord.

Lutheran teachings resolve James' and Paul's verbal conflict regarding faith and works in alternate ways from the Catholics and E. Orthodox:

Paul was dealing with one kind of error while James was dealing with a different error. The errorists Paul was dealing with were people who said that works of the law were needed to be added to faith in order to help earn God's favor. Paul countered this error by pointing out that salvation was by faith alone apart from deeds of the law (Galatians 2:16; Romans 3:21-22). Paul also taught that saving faith is not dead but alive, showing thanks to God in deeds of love (Galatians 5:6 ['...since in Christ Jesus it is not being circumcised or being uncircumcised that can effect anything - only faith working through love.']). James was dealing with errorists who said that if they had faith they didn't need to show love by a life of faith (James 2:14-17). James countered this error by teaching that faith is alive, showing itself to be so by deeds of love (James 2:18,26). James and Paul both teach that salvation is by faith alone and also that faith is never alone but shows itself to be alive by deeds of love that express a believer's thanks to God for the free gift of salvation by faith in Jesus.

== Similar canons at the time ==
In his book Canon of the New Testament, Bruce Metzger notes that in 1596 Jacob Lucius published a Bible at Hamburg which labeled as Apocrypha Luther's four Antilegomena: Hebrews, James, Jude and Revelation; Lucius explained this category of "Apocrypha" as "That is, books that are not held equal to the other holy Scripture". David Wolder, the pastor of Hamburg's Church of St. Peter, published in the same year a triglot Bible which labeled those books as "non canonical". J. Vogt published a Bible at Goslar in 1614 similar to Lucius'. In Sweden, Gustavus Adolphus published in 1618 the Gustavus Adolphus Bible with those four books labeled as "Apocr(yphal) New Testament." Metzger considers those decisions a "startling deviation among Lutheran editions of the Scriptures".

== See also ==
- Apocrypha controversy
