= Third Epistle of John =

Book of the New Testament

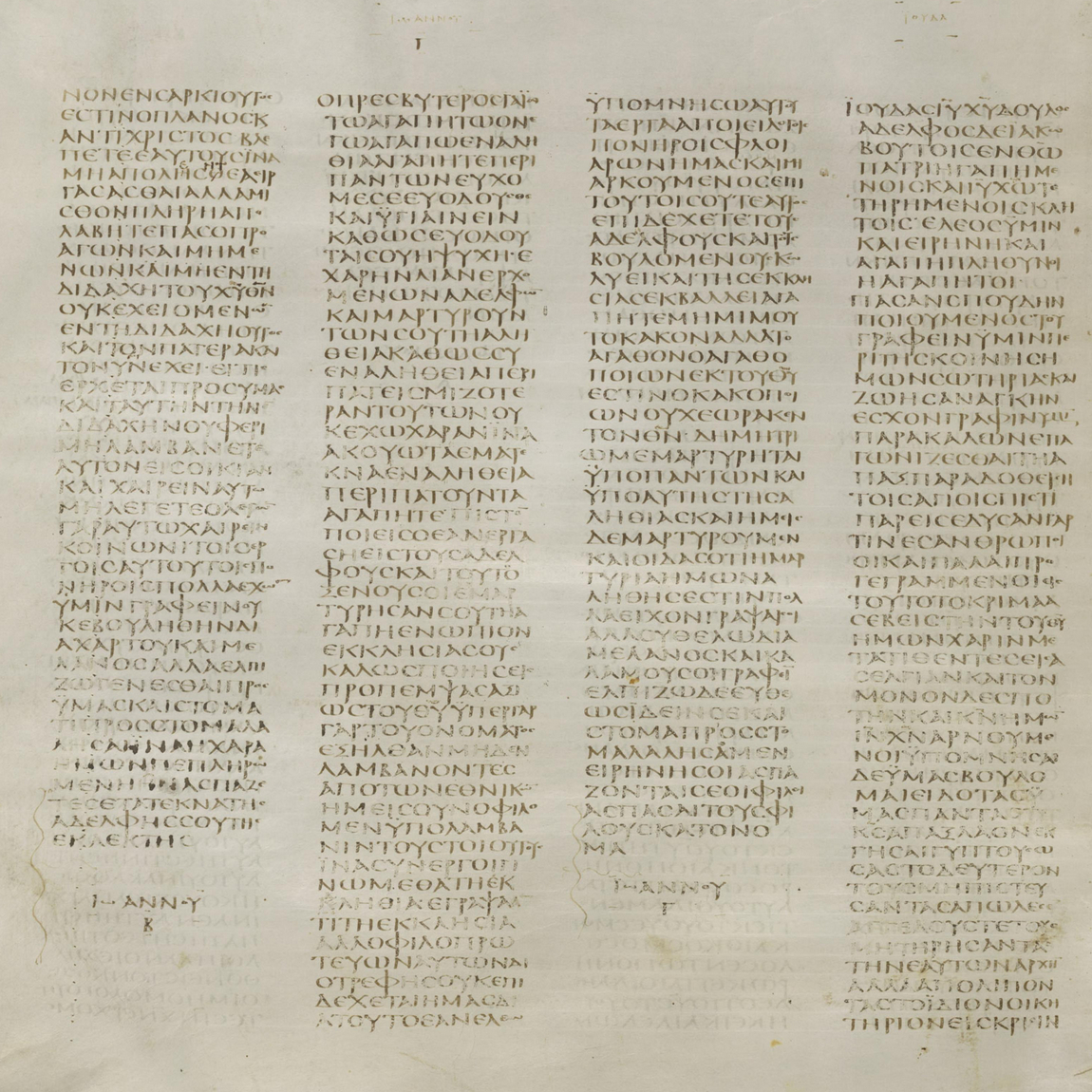
The end of 2 John, continuing on to 3 John, along with the beginning of Jude in Codex Sinaiticus (c. AD 350)

The Third Epistle of John (Note: The book is sometimes called the Third Letter of John, or simply 3 John (which is also its most common form of abbreviation).) is the third-to-last book of the New Testament and the Christian Bible as a whole, and attributed to John the Evangelist, traditionally thought to be the author of the Gospel of John and the other two epistles of John. The Third Epistle of John is a personal letter sent by "the elder" (the presbyter) to a man named Gaius, recommending to him a group of Christians led by Demetrius, which had come to preach the gospel in the area where Gaius lived. The purpose of the letter is to encourage and strengthen Gaius, and to warn him against Diotrephes, who refuses to cooperate with the author of the letter.

Early church literature contains no mention of the epistle, with the first reference to it appearing in the middle of the third century AD. This lack of documentation, though likely due to the extreme brevity of the epistle, caused early church writers to doubt its authenticity until the early 5th century, when it was accepted into the canon along with the other two epistles of John. The language of 3 John echoes that of the Gospel of John, which is conventionally dated to around AD 90, so the epistle was likely written near the end of the first century. Others contest this view, such as the scholar John A. T. Robinson, who dates 3 John to c. AD 60–65. The location of writing is unknown, but tradition places it in Ephesus. The epistle is found in many of the oldest New Testament manuscripts, and its text is free of major discrepancies or textual variants.

== Content ==
3 John is a personal letter: Alfred Plummer notes that it does not fit with the often-used terminology "Catholic epistles". There is no doctrine laid out in 3 John, but the overall theme is the importance of hospitality, especially when it comes to men who were working to spread the gospel. It is the shortest book of the Bible by word count, though 2 John has fewer verses. 3 John has 15 verses in the critical SBL Greek New Testament text, or 14 in the Textus Receptus.

It is the only New Testament book which does not contain the names "Jesus" or "Christ". The original Greek uses the term Ὀνόματος (Onomatos, verse 7) generally translated "Name" and referring specifically to the "Name of Jesus", but the text does not say "Jesus" or "Christ".

=== Greeting and introduction ===
The letter is written to a man named Gaius. Gaius seems to have been a wealthy man, since the epistle's author, who identifies himself only as "the Elder", did not think it would impose unduly on him to host some traveling preachers for a short time. The Elder may have converted Gaius, since he calls Gaius his "child" in the faith. The Apostolic Constitutions VII.46.9 records that Gaius was made bishop of Pergamon, though there is no early support for this statement.

The name Gaius occurs four other times in the New Testament. First, a Christian Gaius is mentioned in Macedonia as a traveling companion of Paul, along with Aristarchus (Acts 19:29). One chapter later, a Gaius from Derbe is named as one of Paul's seven traveling companions who waited for him at Troas (Acts 20:4). Next, a Gaius is mentioned residing in Corinth as being one of only a few people there (the others being Crispus and the household of Stephanas) who were baptised by Paul, who founded the Church in that city (1 Corinthians 1:14). Lastly, a Gaius is referred to in a final greeting portion of the Epistle to the Romans (Romans 16:23) as Paul's "host" and also host of the whole church, in whatever city Paul is writing from at the time (probably Corinth). However, there is no reason to suppose that any of these men were the Gaius of 3 John.

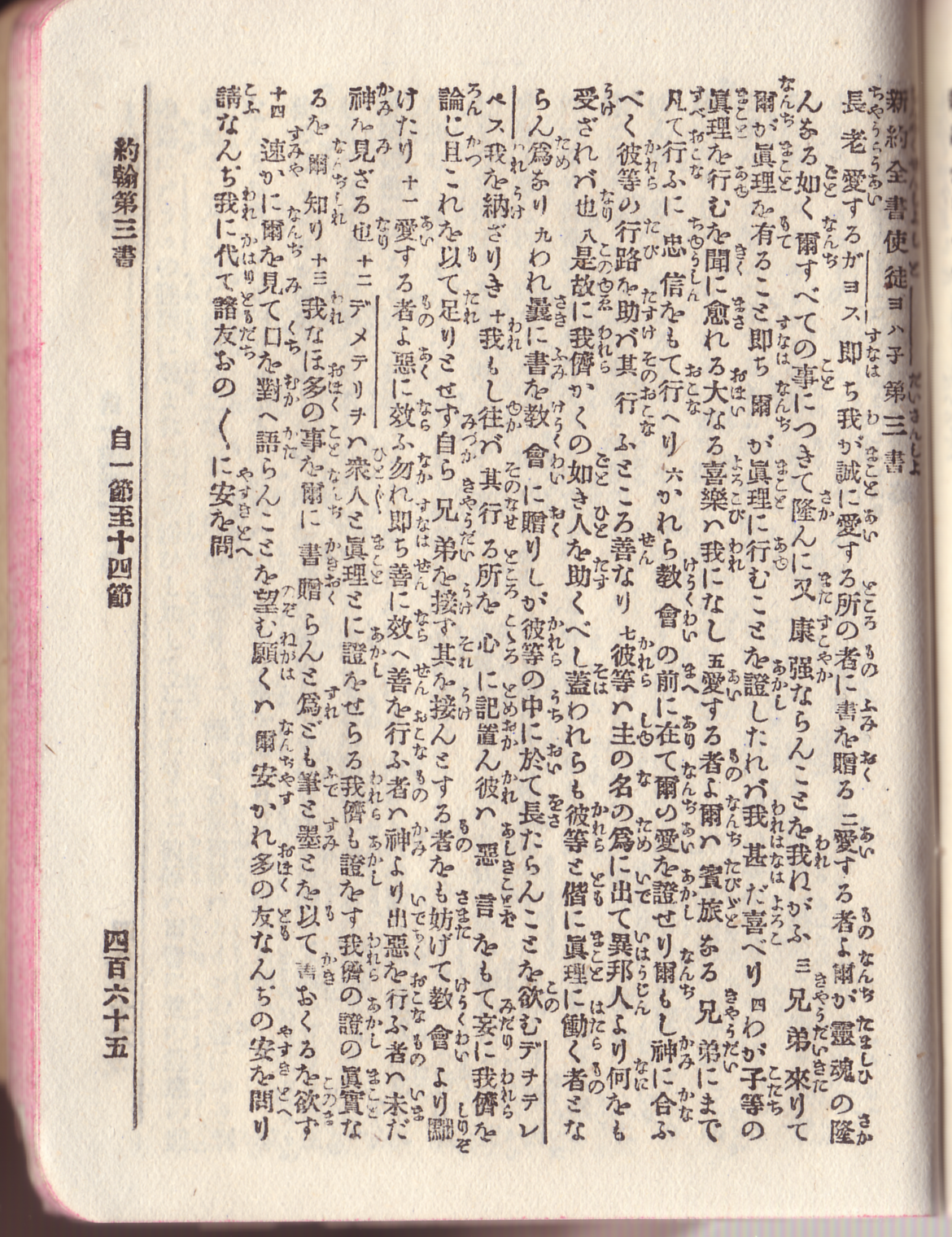
Japanese translation of 3 John (1904)

=== Verse 2 ===
Beloved, I pray that you may prosper in all things and be in health, just as your soul prospers.

This verse, where the author wishes material prosperity upon Gaius similar to the prosperity of his soul, is a commonly used proof text within prosperity gospel teachings; opponents of the prosperity gospel consider the verse to be little more than well-wishing.

=== Missionaries ===
The Elder continues the letter by commending Gaius for his loyalty and his hospitality towards a group of traveling "brothers". The "brothers" are brothers in the faith or missionaries, who in accordance with Jesus's command in Mark 6:8–9 have set out on a journey without any money. The Elder then goes on to request that Gaius provide for the brothers to continue their journey.

=== Opposition of Diotrephes ===
The Elder next describes his conflict with Diotrephes, who does not acknowledge the Elder's authority and is excommunicating those, like Gaius, who welcome missionaries sent by the Elder. In verse 9 the Elder mentions a previous letter which he has written to the church which was suppressed by Diotrephes, and says that he intends to visit the church and to confront Diotrephes. "The church" is apparently known to Gaius, but he is likely not a member of it, since otherwise the Elder would not need to provide him with information about Diotrephes's activities. The dispute between Diotrephes and the Elder seems to be based on church leadership and authority rather than doctrine, since the Elder does not accuse Diotrephes of teaching heresy.

Most scholars do not connect the letter the Elder mentions with 2 John, since 3 John does not contain any reference to the doctrinal controversy described in 2 John, and argue that the Elder is here referring to a previous letter of recommendation. John Painter, however, argues the Elder is in fact referring to 2 John, since there is overlap between 2 John 9 and the theme of hospitality in 3 John.

The Elder closes this section with an entreaty to Gaius: "Beloved, do not imitate evil but imitate good. Whoever does good is from God; whoever does evil has not seen God." This injunction is reminiscent of several passages in 1 John (2:3–5, 3:4–10, 4:7).

=== Final greetings and conclusion ===
Verse 12 introduces another man named Demetrius, who according to the Apostolic Constitutions VII.46.9 was ordained by John as bishop of Philadelphia (modern Amman, Jordan). Demetrius was probably a member of the group of missionaries discussed earlier in the letter, and 3 John likely serves as a recommendation letter to Gaius about Demetrius. Recommendation letters were quite common in the early church, as evidenced by 2 Corinthians 3:1, Romans 16:1–2, and Colossians 4:7–8.

The Elder, before ending the letter, says that he has many other things to tell to Gaius, and plans to make a journey to see him in the near future, using almost the exact language of 2 John 12. The closing verse, "Peace be to you. The friends greet you. Greet the friends, one by one", is typical of contemporary correspondence, with "Peace be to you" a greeting adopted by Christians from the Jews.

== Authorship ==
The author of 2 and 3 John identifies himself as ‘the elder’ in the prescript. Early Christians used the term to describe those from earlier generations, and the parallel with the First Epistle of John suggests the author places himself among those who had personally met Jesus. 3 John was almost certainly written by the same author who wrote 2 John, and likely 1 John as well. This individual may have been John the Evangelist himself or someone else, perhaps John the Presbyter, though according to scholar C. H. Dodd, "If we attempt to ... identify the anonymous author of these epistles with some known individual, we have little but surmise to go on."

There are many similarities between 2 and 3 John. Both follow the format of other personal letters of the era; in both the author self-identifies as "the Presbyter", a term which literally means "the elder"; and both deal with themes of hospitality and conflict within the church. They are also extremely similar in length, probably because they were both written to fit on one papyrus sheet.

3 John is also linguistically similar to both 2 John and other Johannine works. Of 99 different words used, 21 are unimportant words like "and" or "the", leaving 78 significant words. 23 of these do not appear in 1 John or the Gospel of John, of which four are unique to 3 John, one is common to 2 and 3 John, and two are found in both 2 and 3 John as well as in other New Testament writings. Approximately 30% of the significant words in 3 John do not appear in 1 John or the Gospel, compared to 20% for 2 John. These considerations indicate a close affinity between 2 and 3 John, though 2 John is more strongly connected with 1 John than it is with 3 John. A minority of scholars, however, argue against common authorship of 2 and 3 John, and Rudolf Bultmann held that 2 John was a forgery based on 3 John.

If 3 John was written by John the Apostle, however, it is strange that Diotrephes would oppose him since the apostles were highly respected in the early church. One possible alternative view of the epistle's authorship arises from a fragment written by Papias of Hierapolis and quoted by Eusebius which mentions a man named "the Presbyter John". However, since nothing else is known of this individual it is not possible to positively identify him as the author of 3 John.

=== Date and location of writing ===
All three letters of John were likely written within a few years of each other, and internal evidence indicates that they were written after the Gospel of John, placing them in the second half of the first century. This dating makes sense given their allusions and opposition to Gnostic and docetic teaching, which denied the full humanity of Jesus, and which was gaining ascendancy at the end of the first century.

Dodd argues for a date between 96 and 110 A.D., concluding from the absence of references to persecution in the letters that they were probably written after the harsh reign (AD 81–96) of the Roman emperor Domitian, whose persecution of Christians seems to have prompted the writing of the Book of Revelation. Dodd notes, however, that they could have been written in the pre-Domitian era, which is likely if the author was a personal disciple of Jesus. Marshall suggests a date of between the 60s and 90s. Rensberger suggests a dating of around 100, assuming that the Gospel of John was written in the 90s and the letters must have followed after. Brown argues for a date of between 100 and 110, with all three letters composed in close time proximity. A date past 110–115 is unlikely, as parts of 1 John and 2 John are quoted by Polycarp and Papias.

The letters do not indicate the location of authorship, but since the earliest quotations of them (in the writings of Polycarp, Papias, and Irenaeus) come from the province of Asia Minor, it is likely that the epistles were also written in Asia. Church tradition typically places them in the city of Ephesus.

=== Manuscripts ===
3 John is preserved in many of the old manuscripts of the New Testament. Of the Greek great uncial codices, codices Sinaiticus, Alexandrinus, and Vaticanus contain all three Johannine epistles, while Codex Ephraemi Rescriptus contains 3 John 3–15 along with 1 John 1:1–4. Codex Bezae, while missing most of the Catholic epistles, contains 3 John 11–15 in Latin translation. In languages other than Greek, the Vulgate and the Sahidic, Armenian, Philoxenian Syriac, and Ethiopian versions contain all three epistles. Between the different copies there are no major difficulties or differences, meaning that there is very little doubt over determining the original text.

== Canonical history ==
There are some doubtful similarities between passages in the Johannine epistles and the writings of Polycarp and Papias, but the earliest definitive references to the epistles come from the late second century. Irenaeus in Adversus Haereses 3.16.8 (written c. 180), quotes 2 John 7 and 8, and in the next sentence 1 John 4:1, 2, but does not distinguish between 1 and 2 John; he does not quote from 3 John. The Muratorian Canon seems to refer to two letters of John only, though it is possible to interpret it as referring to three. 1 John is extensively cited by Tertullian, who died in 215, and Clement of Alexandria, in addition to quoting 1 John, wrote a commentary on 2 John in his Adumbrationes. All three Johannine epistles were recognized by the 39th festal letter of Athanasius, the Synod of Hippo and the Council of Carthage (397). Additionally Didymus the Blind wrote a commentary on all three epistles, showing that by the early 5th century they were being considered as a single unit.

The first reference to 3 John is in the middle of the third century; Eusebius says that Origen knew of both 2 and 3 John, however Origen is reported as saying "all do not consider them genuine". Similarly, Pope Dionysius of Alexandria, Origen's pupil, was aware of a "reputed Second or Third Epistle of John". Also around this time 3 John is thought to have been known in North Africa as it was referred to in the Sententiae Episcoporum produced by the Seventh Council of Carthage. There was doubt about the authority of 3 John, however, with Eusebius listing it and 2 John as "disputed books" despite describing them as "well-known and acknowledged by most". Although Eusebius believed the Apostle wrote the Gospel and the epistles, it is likely that doubt about the fidelity of the author of 2 and 3 John was a factor in causing them to be disputed. By the end of the fourth century the Presbyter (author of 2 and 3 John) was thought to be a different person than the Apostle John. This opinion, although reported by Jerome, was not held by all, as Jerome himself attributed the epistles to John the Apostle.

== See also ==
- John the Apostle
- Textual variants in the Third Epistle of John

== Bibliography ==
- Brooke, A. E. (1912). A Critical and Exegetical Commentary on the Johannine Epistles. International Critical Commentary. New York: C. Scribner's Sons. OCLC 355394.
- Brown, R. E. (1982). The Epistles of John. Anchor Bible, 30. Garden City, New York: Doubleday. ISBN 9780385056861.
- Dodd, C. H. (1946). The Johannine Epistles. London: Hodder and Stoughton Limited. OCLC 384916.
- Marshall I. H. (1978). The Epistles of John. The New International Commetry on the New Testament. William B. Eerdmans. ISBN 9780802825186. OCLC 3609574.
- Painter, John (2002). Daniel J. Harrington (ed.). 1, 2, and 3 John. Collegeville, Minnesota: Liturical Press. ISBN 0814658121.
- Plummer, A. (1890). The Epistles of St. John. Cambridge University Press.
- Rensberger, D. (1997). 1 John, 2 John, 3 John. Abingdon New Testament Commentaries. Abingdon Press, Nashville. ISBN 9780687057221.
- Robinson, J. A. T. (1976). Redating the New Testament. Wipf & Stock Publishers. ISBN 1-57910-527-0. Archived from the original on 2007-11-20.
- Schnackenburg, Rudolf (1992). The Jonannine Epistles. Translated by Reginald and Ilse Fuller. New York: Crossroads.
- Stott, J. R. W. (1964). The Epistles of John. Grand Rapids, Michigan: Eerdmans. OCLC 814439581.

Third Epistle of John General Epistle
Preceded by Second John	New Testament; Books of the Bible	Succeeded by Jude
