= Fifty Bibles of Constantine =

Set of books commissioned in 331

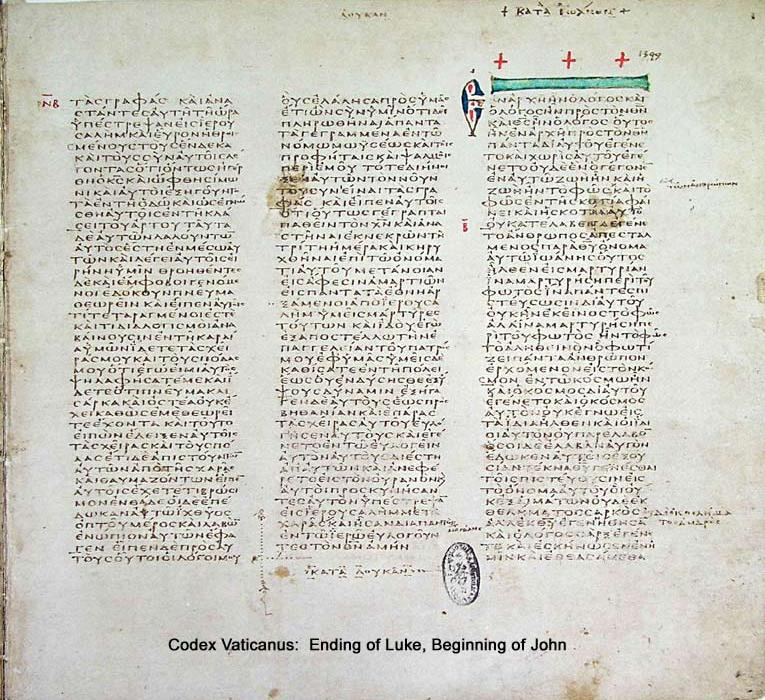
Codex Vaticanus

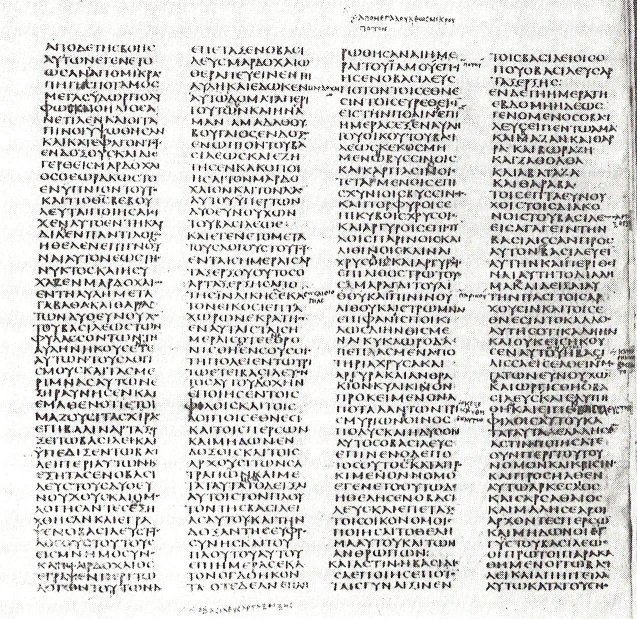
Codex Sinaiticus

The Fifty Bibles of Constantine are said to have been Bibles in the Greek language commissioned in 331 by Constantine I and prepared by Eusebius of Caesarea. They were made for the use of the Bishop of Constantinople in the growing number of churches in that very new city. Eusebius quoted the letter of commission in his Life of Constantine, and it is the only surviving source which attests the existence of the Bibles.

== Biblical canon ==
It is speculated that this commission may have provided motivation for the development of the canon lists and that Codex Sinaiticus and Codex Vaticanus are possible surviving examples of these Bibles. There is no evidence among the records of the First Council of Nicaea of any determination on the canon; however, Jerome, in his Prologue to Judith, makes the claim that the Book of Judith was "found by the Nicene Council to have been counted among the number of the Sacred Scriptures".

== Requisition ==
According to Eusebius, Constantine I wrote him in his letter:

I have thought it expedient to instruct your Prudence to order fifty copies of the sacred Scriptures, the provision and use of which you know to be most needful for the instruction of the Church, to be written on prepared parchment in a legible manner, and in a convenient, portable form, by professional transcribers thoroughly practised in their art.

About accomplishing the Emperor's demand:

Such were the emperor's commands, which were followed by the immediate execution of the work itself, which we sent him in magnificent and elaborately bound volumes of a threefold and fourfold form.

This is the usual way in which Eusebius' text is translated, but there are more possibilities, because the phrase "ἐν πολυτελῶς ἠσκημένοις τεύχεσιν τρισσὰ καὶ τετρασσὰ διαπεμψάντων ἡμῶν" has many potential meanings:

1. Three or four codices were prepared at a time – Kirsopp Lake and Bernard de Montfaucon;
2. Codices were sent in three or four boxes – F. A. Heinichen;
3. Codices were prepared in with three or four folios – Scrivener;
4. Text of the codices was written in three or four columns per page – Tischendorf, Gebhardt, and Gregory, Kirsopp Lake;
5. Codices were sent by threes or fours.
6. Some codices contained three gospels (Matthew, Mark, and Luke) but others included four gospels (including John) - Eduard Schwartz.

Athanasius of Alexandria referred to another request of producing Bible manuscripts: "I sent to him volumes containing the holy Scriptures, which he had ordered me to prepare for him." Athanasius could have received this request between 337 and 339.

== Codex Sinaiticus and Vaticanus ==
Constantin von Tischendorf, discoverer of Codex Sinaiticus, believed that Sinaiticus and Vaticanus were among these fifty Bibles prepared by Eusebius in Caesarea. According to him, they were written with three (as Vaticanus) or four columns per page (as Sinaiticus). Tischendorf's view was supported by Pierre Batiffol.

Frederick Henry Ambrose Scrivener rejected Tischendorf's speculation because of differences between the two manuscripts. In Sinaiticus, the text of the Gospels is divided according to the Ammonian Sections with references to the Eusebian Canons, but Vaticanus used the older system of division. Vaticanus was prepared in a format of 5 folios in one quire, but Sinaiticus had 8 folios. According to Scrivener, Eusebian Bibles contained three or four folios per quire (Scrivener used a Latin version of Valesius). Scrivener stated that the Eusebian is unclear and should not be used for a doubtful theory.

Westcott and Hort argued the order of biblical books on the Eusebian list of the canonical books, quoted by Eusebius in "Ecclesiastical History" (III, 25), is different from every surviving manuscript. Probably none of the 50 copies survive today.

Caspar René Gregory believed that Vaticanus and Sinaiticus were written in Caesarea, and they could belong to the Eusebian fifty.

According to Victor Gardthausen Sinaiticus is younger than Vaticanus by at least 50 years.

Kirsopp Lake states "copies of three and four columns" is grammatically sound, but there appears not to be good evidence for this technical use of the words. "Sending them by threes of fours" is the most attractive, but there is no evidence that τρισσα can denote "three at a time". Regarding "in three or four columns per page," there is only one known manuscript written in that way – Sinaiticus. Sinaiticus has a curious spelling of the word κραβαττος as κραβακτος; Sinaiticus spells Ισραηλειτης as Ισδραηλειτης, Vaticanus as Ιστραηλειτης; these forms have been regarded as Latin, and they can be found in papyri from Egypt. There is no other known Greek district in which these forms were used. The argument for a Caesarean origin of these two manuscripts is much weaker than Egyptian.

According to Heinrich Schumacher, Eusebius instead prepared fifty lectionaries, not Bibles.

Skeat argued that Sinaiticus was a first attempt to produce a full Bible in fulfillment of Constantine's order but was abandoned before completion in favor of a more compact form (then languishing in Caesarea until salvaged in the sixth century), while Vaticanus was one of the fifty Bibles actually delivered to Constantinople.

Kurt Aland, Bruce M. Metzger, Bart D. Ehrman doubt that Sinaiticus and Vaticanus were copied by Eusebius on the Constantine order.

== See also ==
- Differences between codices Sinaiticus and Vaticanus
- Great uncial codices
