= Second Epistle of John =

Book of the New Testament

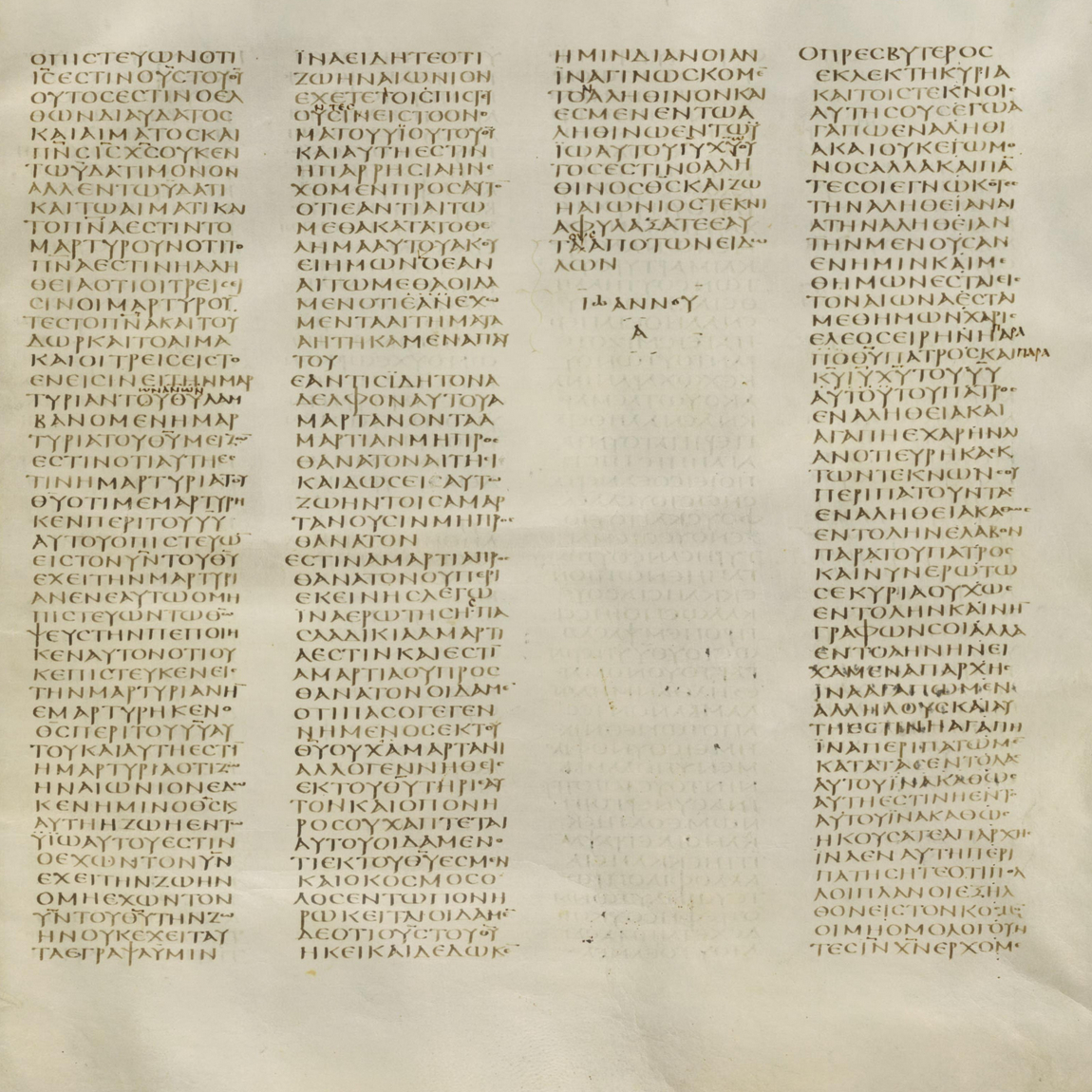
The end of 1 John, continuing on to 2 John 1:1–7 in Codex Sinaiticus (c. AD 350)

The Second Epistle of John (Note: The book is sometimes called the Second Letter of John, or simply 2 John (which is also its most common form of abbreviation).) is a book of the New Testament attributed to John the Evangelist, traditionally thought to be the author of the other two epistles of John, and the Gospel of John (though this is disputed). Most modern scholars believe this is not John the Apostle, but in general there is no consensus as to the identity of this person or group.

== Composition ==
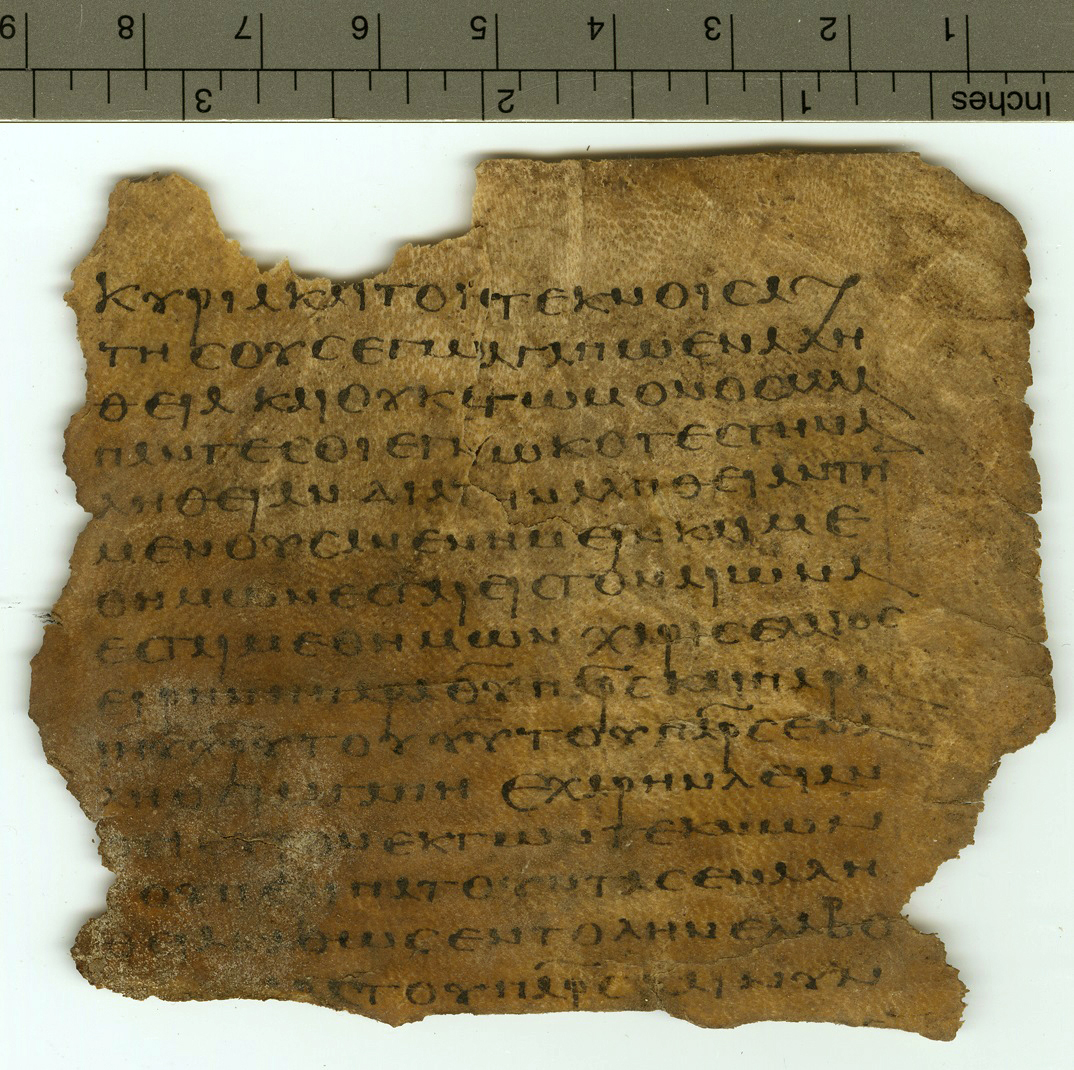
Manuscript of the New Testament with the text of the Second Epistle of John 1–5 (5th or 6th century)

The author of 2 John identifies himself as ‘the elder’ in the prescript. Early Christians used the term to describe those from earlier generations, and the parallel with 1 John 1-3 suggests the author places himself among those who had personally met Jesus. The language of this epistle is remarkably similar to 3 John. It is therefore suggested by a few that a single author composed both of these letters. The traditional view contends that all the letters are by the hand of John the Apostle, and the linguistic structure, special vocabulary, and polemical issues all lend toward this theory.

Also significant is the clear warning against paying heed to those who say that Jesus was not a flesh-and-blood figure: "For many deceivers are entered into the world, who confess not that Jesus Christ is come in the flesh." This establishes that, from the time the epistle was first written, there were those who had docetic Christologies, believing that the human person of Jesus was actually pure spirit or did not come at all.

Alternatively, the letter's acknowledgment and rejection of gnostic theology may reveal a later date of authorship than orthodox Christianity claims. This can not be assured by a simple study of the context. Gnosticism's beginnings and its relationship to Christianity are poorly dated, due to an insufficient corpus of literature relating the first interactions between the two religions. It vehemently condemns such anti-corporeal attitudes, which also indicates that those taking such unorthodox positions were either sufficiently vocal, persuasive, or numerous enough to warrant rebuttal in this form. Adherents of gnosticism were most numerous during the second and third centuries.

== Interpretation of "the lady" ==
The text is addressed "to the elect lady" and her children (Greek: ἐκλεκτῇ κυρίᾳ, romanized: eklektē kyria; some interpretations translate this phrase as "elder lady," "a very special woman," "chosen lady," "dear Lady" etc.), and closes with the words, "The children of thy elect sister greet thee." The person addressed is commended for her piety, and is warned against false teachers.

The lady has often been seen as a metaphor for the church, the church being the body of believers as a whole and as local congregations. The children would be members of that local congregation. The writer also includes a greeting from another church in the final verse, "The children of thy elect sister greet thee." The term the elect (ἐκλεκτοί, eklektoi) was a fairly common term for those who believe in the gospel and follow Christ. Scholar Amos Wilder supports this view, saying the content of the epistle itself shows it was addressed to the church as a whole rather than a single person.

Another interpretation holds that the letter is addressed to a specific individual. Athanasius proposed that Kyria, the Greek word used here which means lady, was actually a name. The Young's Literal Translation of the Bible translates it this way. It is also possible it refers to an individual but simply does not use her name. One theory is that the letter refers to Mary, mother of Jesus; Jesus had entrusted his "beloved disciple" with Mary's life when Jesus was on the cross (John 19:26–27). The children would thus refer to the brothers of Jesus: James, Joses, Simon and Jude, and the sister to Mary's sister mentioned in John 19:25. Mary was likewise never referred to by name in John's gospel. Such an interpretation would assume a much earlier date of composition than modern scholars have suggested.

== Reception history ==
Polycarp demonstrates familiarity with the First Epistle of John and possibly the Second Epistle of John.

== See also ==
- Authorship of the Johannine works
- Textual variants in the New Testament § Second Epistle of John

== Notes ==
Second Epistle of John General Epistle
Preceded by First John	New Testament; Books of the Bible	Succeeded by Third John
