= Hermas (freedman) =

2nd century Roman freedman and writer

- Born: Aquileia, Italy, Roman Empire
- Occupation: Writer
- Notable work: The Shepherd of Hermas
- Parent: Rufinus
- Relatives: Pope Pius I

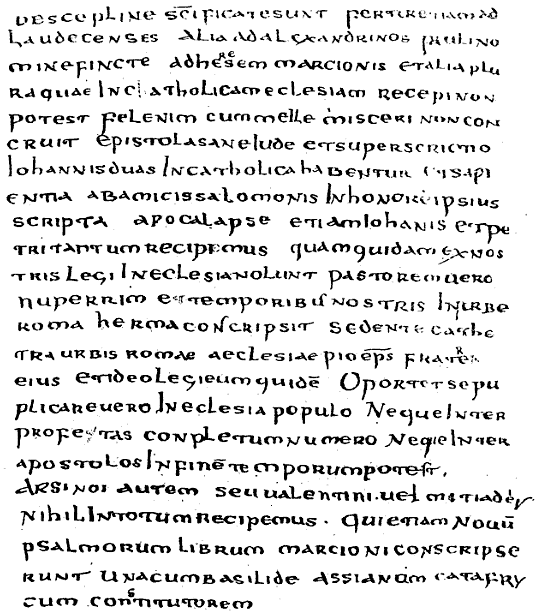
Last page of the Muratorian fragment; Hermas is mentioned near the middle, Pastorem vero nuperrim ettemporibus nostris in urbe Roma Herma conscripsit sedente cathetra urbis Romae aeclesiae Pio Eps fratrer eius ("'The Shepherd', moreover, did Hermas write very recently in our times in the city of Rome, while his brother bishop Pius sat in the chair of the Church of Rome.")

Hermas (Greek: Ερμάς) was a freedman and Christian born in Aquileia, who lived in Ancient Rome. He was a brother of Pius, Bishop of Rome about the middle of the 2nd century. His father was an Italian called Rufinus, and according to the Liber Pontificalis was also a native of Aquileia. Some later writers identify him as Hermas of Dalmatia, mentioned in Romans 16:14. Hermas the freedman was the character and, by some assessments, the author of the work titled The Shepherd of Hermas, which, in the early Church, was sometimes classed among the canonical Scriptures.

== Relationship to Pius I ==
There are three sources indicating Hermas was the brother of Pius I:

- (a) the Muratorian fragment,: "Pastorem vero nuperrime temporibus nostris in urbe Roma Herma conscripsit, sedente cathedra urbis Romae ecclesiae Pio episcopo fratre ejus. Et ideo legi eum quidem oportet, se publicare vero in ecclesia populo neque inter prophetas completos numero, neque inter apostolos in fine temporum, potest" - "And very recently, in our own times, in the city of Rome, Herma wrote the Pastor, when his brother Pius, the bishop, sat upon the chair of the Church of the city of Rome. And therefore that (book) ought to be perused, but it cannot be publicly read to the people assembled in church, neither among the Prophets, whose number is complete, nor among the Apostles (who came) in the end of times."
- (b) the Liberian catalogue of popes, in a portion which dates from 235 (Hippolytus?): "Sub hujus (Pii) episcopatu frater ejus Ermes librum scripsit, in quo mandatum continetur quae (quod) praecepit ei angelus, cum venit ad illum in habitu Pastoris" - "Under his (Pius') episcopate, his brother Ermes wrote a book in which are contained the precepts which the angel delivered to him, coming to him in the guise of a Shepherd."
- (c) the poem of Pseudo-Tertullian against Marcion, of the 3rd or 4th century: "Post hunc deinde Pius, Hermas cui germine frater angelicus Pastor, quia tradita verba locutus." - "Then, after him, Pius, whose brother according to the flesh was Hermas, the angelic shepherd, because he spoke the words given to him."

The statement that Hermas wrote during his brother's Pius pontificate may similarly be an inference from the fact that it was in a list of popes, against the name of Pius, that the writer found the information that Hermas was that pope's brother. He may have been an elder brother of the pope.

== The Shepherd ==
The Shepherd has been viewed as an allegory, similar to Pilgrim's Progress. Apparent autobiographical points "...may be fact, or pure fiction, or fiction founded upon fact." It is not even certain that the writer's name was really Hermas.

== Butler's account ==
The hagiographer Alban Butler (1710–1773) wrote in his Lives of the Fathers, Martyrs, and Other Principal Saints under May 9,

St. Hermas was a Christian of distinction in Rome, whom St. Paul salutes. Origen believes him to have been the author of the book entitled Pastor, and certain modern writers fall in with this conjecture. But that seems rather to have been the work of a later Hermas. Some, indeed, with Tillemont, Ceillier, &c. conclude from the contents, that it was compiled before the persecution of Domitian in 95: but Du Guet, and others think it was only written about the year 142, against the Montanists and their false prophets. It is quoted by St. Clement of Alexandria, Origen, Tertullian, Eusebius, St. Jerom, &c. It is divided into three books; the first contains revelations; the second precepts; and the third similitudes, which resemble the revelations of the first. The author entitles his work Pastor, or the Shepherd, from the angel his monitor, who assumed the appearance of a shepherd, and whose dictates he professes to write. He assigns to every one not only an angel guardian, but also a devil who is his tempter; he recommends prayers, alms-deeds, and other good works on fast days: mentions a state of continency with approbation; says that penance, which is followed by frequent relapses, is generally fruitless. Bishop Wake published an English translation of this work, together with the epistles of St. Clemens, St. Barnabas, St. Ignatius, and St. Polycarp, in 1693, and republished the same in 1710.

== Sources ==
- Herbermann, Charles, ed. (1913). "Hermas" . Catholic Encyclopedia. New York: Robert Appleton Company.
- This article incorporates text from a publication now in the public domain: Gilman, D. C.; Peck, H. T.; Colby, F. M., eds. (1905). New International Encyclopedia (1st ed.). New York: Dodd, Mead.
- Butler, Rev. Alban (1866), The Lives of the Saints, vol. V: May – via Bartleby.com
