= The Shepherd of Hermas =

Christian literary work of the 1st or 2nd century

The Shepherd of Hermas (Ancient Greek: Ποιμὴν τοῦ Ἑρμᾶ, romanized: Poimēn tou Herma; Latin: Pastor Hermae), sometimes just called The Shepherd, is a Christian literary work of the late first half of the second century, considered a valuable book by many Christians, but not considered canonical scripture by the early Church Fathers such as Irenaeus. The Shepherd was popular among Christians in the 2nd, 3rd, and 4th centuries. It is found in the Codex Sinaiticus. The Muratorian fragment identifies the author of The Shepherd as Hermas, the brother of Pope Pius I. The Muratorian fragment also explicitly states that The Shepherd of Hermas is useful for private reading but not to be read publicly in the church because it is not apostolic.

== Language and translation ==
The book was originally written in Rome in Koine Greek. A first Latin translation, the Vulgata (meaning "common language", with no connection to Jerome's Vulgate), was made very shortly afterwards. A second Latin translation, the Palatina (part of the collection of the Bibliotheca Palatina), was made at the beginning of the fifth century. Of the Greek version, the last fifth or so is missing. The Vulgata is therefore the earliest translation and the most complete witness.

The Shepherd was also translated at least twice into the Coptic (Egyptian) language, and fragments of translations in both the Sahidic and Akhmimic dialects survive. Three translations into Ge'ez (Ethiopic) were also made, but none survive complete. The sole surviving Georgian translation seems to have been made from an Arabic version, but no Arabic translation has been preserved. There does not appear to have been a Syriac translation, and no Syriac author shows any awareness of the Shepherd, which was always more popular in the Western Roman Empire and Alexandria than in the East. There was, however, a Middle Persian translation made for a Manichaean readership, which survives in a single fragmentary manuscript found at Turfan in what is now China.

== Contents ==
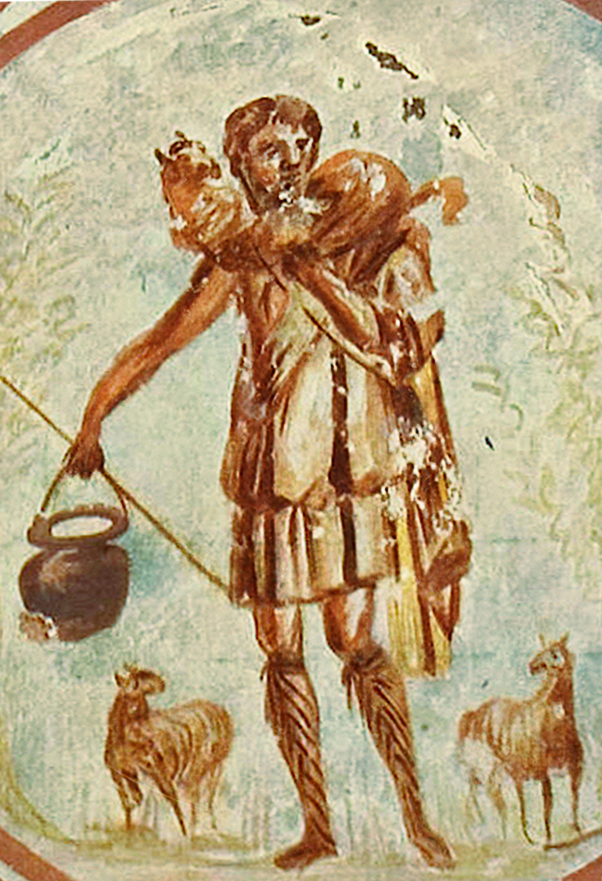
The Shepherd of Hermas, or the Good Shepherd, 3rd century, Catacombs of Rome

The book consists of five visions granted to Hermas, a former slave. This is followed by twelve mandates or commandments, and ten similitudes (that is, parables). It commences abruptly in the first person: "He who brought me up sold me to a certain Rhode, who was at Rome. After many years I met her again, and began to love her as a sister." As Hermas is on the road to Cumae, he has a vision of Rhode. She tells him that she is now his accuser in heaven, on account of unchaste and impure thoughts with which the (now) married narrator once had regarding her. He is to repent and pray for forgiveness, for himself and all his house. He is consoled by a vision of the Church in the form of an elderly woman, weak and helpless from the sins of her unfaithful children, who tells him to bear fruits of repentance and to correct the sins of his children. Subsequently, after his repentance he sees her made younger, yet still wrinkled and with white hair; later yet, she appears as quite young but still with white hair; and lastly, she shows herself as a glorious Bride.

This allegorical language continues through the other parts of the work. In the second vision, the old woman gives Hermas a book, which she later takes back in order to add to it. The fifth vision, which is represented as taking place 20 days after the fourth, introduces "the Angel (Messenger) of repentance" in the guise of a shepherd, from whom the whole work takes its name. He delivers to Hermas a series of precepts (Latin: mandata; Greek: ἐντολαί, entolai), which form an interesting development of early Christian ethics. One point which deserves special mention is the instruction of a Christian husband's obligation to forgive and take back an adulterous wife upon her repentance. The eleventh mandate, on humility, is concerned with false prophets who desire to occupy the primary or best seats (that is to say, among the presbyters). Some have seen here a reference to Marcion, who came to Rome c. 140 and desired to be admitted among the priests (or possibly even to become bishop of Rome).

After the mandates come ten similitudes (Latin: similitudines; Greek: παραβολαί, parabolai) in the form of visions (Latin: visiones; Greek: ὁράσεις, horaseis) which are explained by the angel. The longest of these (Similitude 9) is an elaboration of the parable of the building of a tower, which had formed the matter of the third vision. The tower is the Church, and the stones of which it is built are the faithful. In the third vision it looks as though only the holy are a part of the true Church; in Similitude 9 it is clearly pointed out that all the baptized are included, though they may be cast out for grave sins, and can be readmitted only after repentance.

== Authorship and date ==
Textual criticism, the nature of the theology, and the author's apparent familiarity with the Book of Revelation and other Johannine texts are thought to set the date of composition in the 2nd century. However, several ancient witnesses support an early dating and there is internal evidence for the place and date of this work in the language and theology of the work. The reference to an unknown Clement is presumed by some to be Clement of Rome; if this is that Clement, it would suggest a date c. 90 for at least the historicised setting of the first two visions. Since Paul sent greetings to a Hermas, a Christian of Rome (Romans 16:14), a minority have followed Origen of Alexandria's opinion that he was the author of this religious allegory.

Three ancient witnesses claim to identify the author of this writing. These authorities may be citing the same source, perhaps Hegesippus, whose lost history of the early Church provided material for Eusebius of Caesarea. The witnesses are the Muratorian fragment, the Liberian Catalogue of Popes (a record that was later used in the writing of the Liber Pontificalis) and a poem written by "Pseudo-Tertullian" in the 3rd or 4th century AD.

The Muratorian fragment—generally considered to have been written c. AD 170 (although a few scholars disagree with this dating)—may be the earliest known canon of New Testament writings. It identifies Hermas, the author of The Shepherd, as the brother of Pius I, bishop of Rome:

But Hermas wrote The Shepherd very recently, in our times, in the city of Rome, while bishop Pius, his brother, was occupying the chair of the church of the city of Rome. And therefore it ought indeed to be read; but it cannot be read publicly to the people in church either among the Prophets, whose number is complete, or among the Apostles, for it is after their time.

== Theology ==
In parable 5, the author mentions a Son of God as a virtuous man filled with a holy "pre-existent spirit" and adopted as the Son. In the 2nd century, adoptionism (the view that Jesus Christ was, at least initially, only a mortal man) was one of two competing doctrines about Jesus's true nature, the other being that he pre-existed as the Word (Logos) or only-begotten Son of God and is to be identified as such from his conception; Christ's identity as the Logos (John 1:1), in which the Logos is further understood to be uncreated and coessentially divine with God (that is, the Father), was affirmed in AD 325 at the First Council of Nicaea. Bogdan G. Bucur says the document was widely accepted among orthodox Christians, yet was not criticized for apparently exhibiting an adoptionistic Christology. He says that the passage in question should be understood as Jesus making his dwelling within those who submit to his spirit, so that the adoption that takes place is not of Jesus, but of his followers.

Some believe that Hermas has a binitarian understanding of God, as it appears to identify the Holy Spirit with the Son of God; there is, however, disagreement upon this point. Kelly calls the Christology of Hermas "an amalgam of binitarianism and adoptionism".

Hermas has a synergist understanding of soteriology, where both works and faith are needed to be saved. For Hermas baptism is necessary to be saved and warns those who undergo baptism by the danger of postbaptismal sins. The Shepherd of Hermas possibly supports delaying baptism for practical reasons which is because of the fear of post-baptismal sins. According to Hermas, those who fall into sin after baptism have only one chance of penance.

The book has a high emphasis on morals and the work is an indication of Jewish Christianity—still keeping the Law of Moses.

Hermas has some similarities to Montanism, such as a support of a belief in prophetic gifts and disciplinarian rigorism, however a direct connection does not exist.

The principles which Novatian formulated have their origin in the Shepherd of Hermas.

Some have argued that Hermas is the first example of pre-tribulational rapture. Though Hermas does not mention a rapture, he writes of believers that "have escaped from great tribulation on account of [their] faith" and that others could also escape "the great tribulation that is coming".

== Place in Christian literature ==
Tertullian implies that Pope Callixtus I had quoted it as an authority (though evidently not as one of the books of the Bible), for he replies: "I would admit your argument, if the writing of The Shepherd had deserved to be included in the Divine Instrument, and if it were not judged by every council of the Churches, even of your own Churches, among the apocryphal." And again, he says that the "Epistle of Barnabas", which is Tertullian's name for the New Testament Epistle to the Hebrews, is "more received among the Churches than the apocryphal epistle of the Shepherd".

== Editions ==
The Greek text is edited by Gebhardt and Harnack (Leipzig, 1877), by Funk (Tübingen, 1901), and, with its English translation, by Lightfoot, Apostolic Fathers, edited by Harmon (London, 1893); the Codex Sinaiticus of Hermas was edited by Lake (Oxford, 1911). The English translation by William Wake (Archbishop of Canterbury 1716–1737) is given in W. Hone & J. Jones's Apocryphal New Testament (London, 1820). An English translation is also in Volume II of the American edition of Ante-Nicene Fathers, edited by Roberts & Donaldson (Buffalo, New York, 1886). Other English translations are by Kirsopp Lake, The Apostolic Fathers (Harvard Univ. Press, Loeb Classical Library, 1913), and Edgar J. Goodspeed, The Apostolic Fathers (New York, Harper & Bros., 1950). In general, consult:

- Cruttwell, Literary History of Early Christianity, Volume II (London, 1893).
- Krüger, History of Early Christian Literature (New York, 1897).
- Harnack, Chronologie der altchristlichen Literatur, Volume I (Leipzig, 1897).
- Taylor, The Shepherd of Hermas (New York, 1901).

== See also ==
- Confession in the first two centuries
- Hermas of Philippopolis
- Papyrus 129
- Shoulder angel
