= Anvil firing =

Launching an anvil into the air with gunpowder

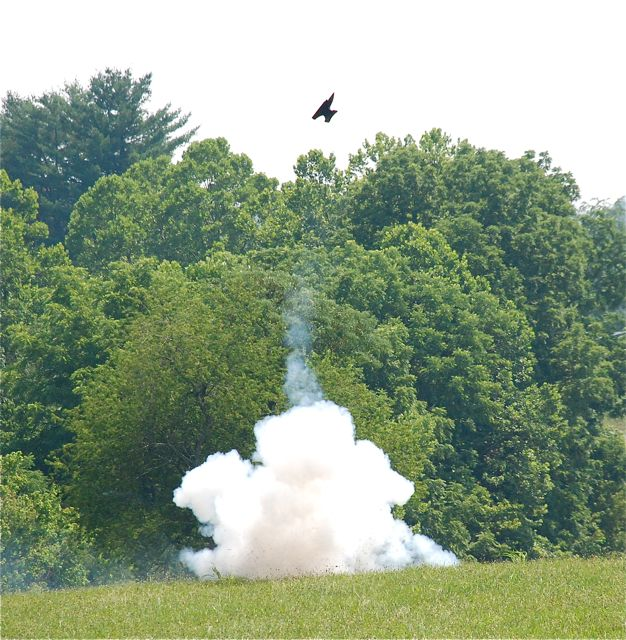
An anvil being fired

Anvil firing (also known as anvil launching or anvil shooting) is the practice of firing an anvil into the air with gunpowder.

It is a traditional event held in New Westminster to celebrate Queen Victoria's birthday.

In the United Kingdom, the term refers to a method of testing anvils. Black powder was poured onto the top of the anvil and ignited. If the anvil did not shatter, it was deemed safe to use.

== Method ==
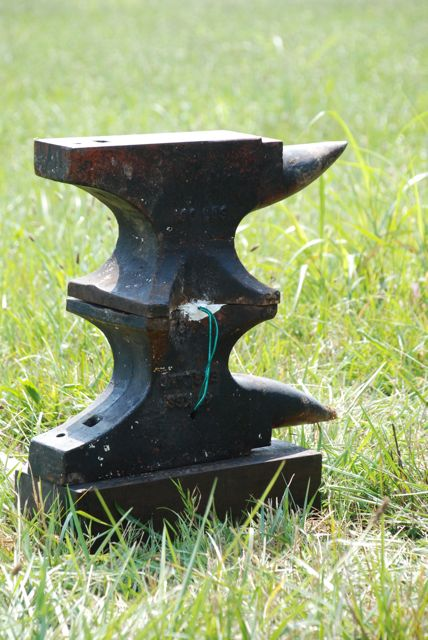
A prepared anvil. Gunpowder is in a chamber between the anvils and visco fuse

Typically, two anvils are used: one as a base (placed upside down), and another one (also known as the "flier") as the projectile (placed right-side up, atop the base). An alternative method is to place the bottom anvil upright, and fill the hardy hole with black powder. A torus or washer, often made from a playing card, is placed over the hole, with a space for a fuse or powder trail. The top anvil is placed upside down, face to face with the bottom anvil.

A technique for firing a single anvil uses a stone base. The space formed by the anvil's concave base is filled with black powder. Modern double-base powders have much higher energy densities, making them unsuitable. A fuse is made to project out, then lit, and the resulting deflagration sends the projectile anvil several feet into the air.

Anvils were traditionally fired on St. Clement's Day, honoring Pope Clement I, the patron saint of blacksmiths and metalworkers.

Although its practice has lessened in recent years, enthusiasts still participate in anvil launching events and competitions. On September 5, 2011, The Science Channel premiered Flying Anvils, a reality television series about anvil firing.

== Dangers ==
Individuals may be crushed by falling anvils. The black powder can also prematurely ignite when the top anvil is placed. As in any case where an explosive is confined on all sides by metal, shrapnel presents a hazard. If a damaged or structurally weak anvil is used, the anvil base may shatter upon ignition.

== Physics and chemistry ==
The technique depends on the fact that black powder is a low explosive, which burns more rapidly when under pressure.

== Historical uses ==
A “21-anvil salute” replaced the traditional 21-gun salute on Victoria Day 1860 in New Westminster, British Columbia, after the town's cannon and status as capital of British Columbia was taken away.

On November 7, 1864, during the American Civil War, the commander of the Iowa Home Guard militia in Davis County, Iowa, having no artillery piece at his disposal, ordered a local citizen to fire an anvil in the county seat at Bloomfield to alert militiamen in outlying townships in response to intelligence received of the presence of Confederate bushwhackers in Davis County. This was in response to a report of two suspected Confederate guerrillas at a residence in the neighborhood where they had demanded money and food and had terrorized the occupants, a Mr. and Mrs. Gore. The private citizen who carried out the order to fire the anvil was seriously injured.

One noteworthy celebration was held on the day the State of Texas voted to secede from the Union. On February 23, 1861, Texas Ranger and prominent Union supporter Thomas Lopton Campbell Jr. was held captive and forced to "fire the anvils" in the streets of Austin.

== Sources ==
- Postman, Richard (1998). Anvils in America. Berrien Springs, Michigan: Postma. ISBN 978-0-9663256-0-7. OCLC 40130801.
