= Pope Anacletus =

Head of the Catholic Church from c. 80 to c. 92

Pope Saint Anacletus
- Bishop of Rome
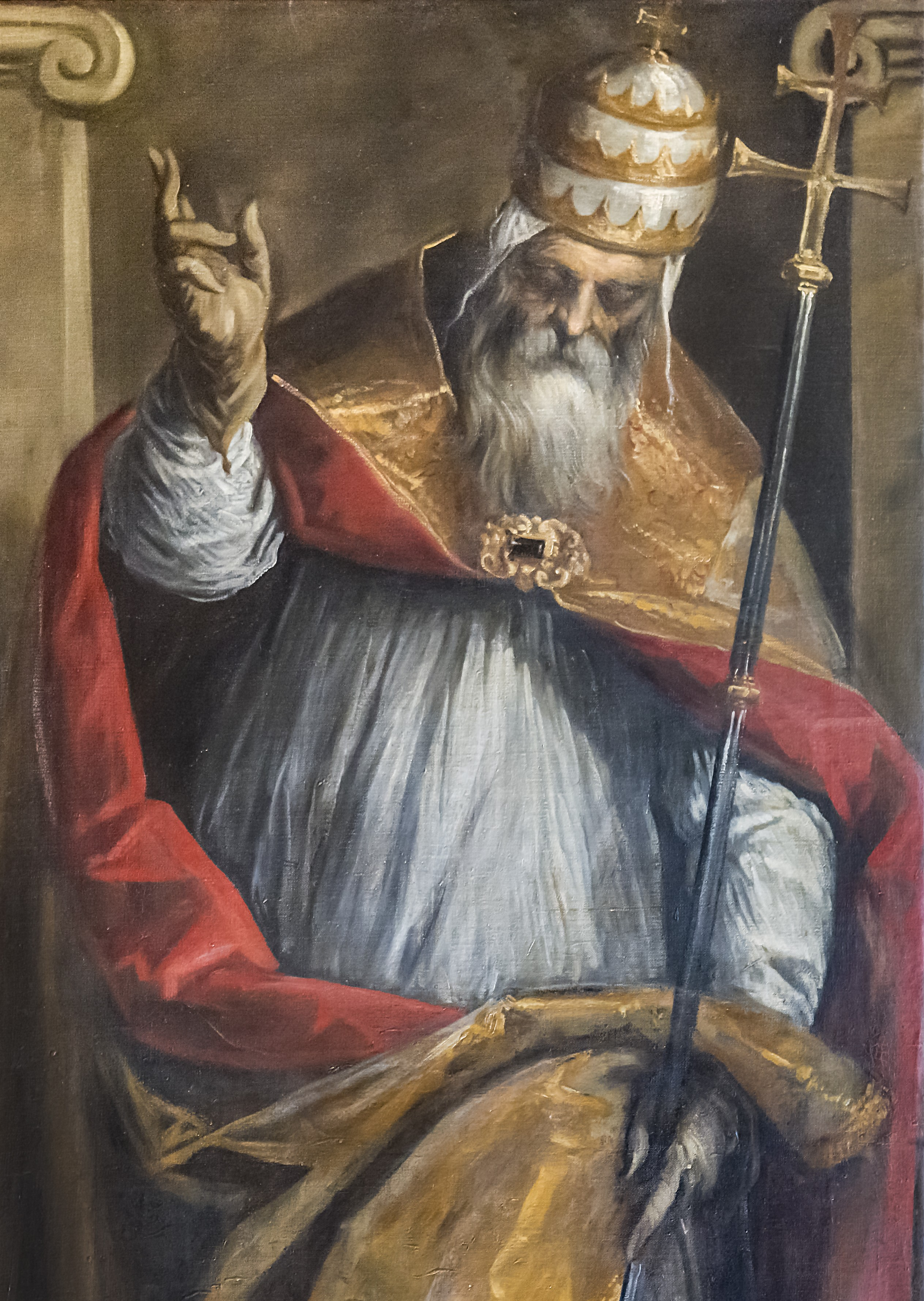
- 16th century painting of Anacletus, in the I Gesuiti, Venice, by Palma il Giovane, with anachronistic papal tiara
- Church: Early Church
- Papacy began: c. 80
- Papacy ended: c. 92
- Predecessor: Linus
- Successor: Clement I

Orders
- Consecration: by Peter

Personal details
- Born: c. 15 Rome, Italy, Roman Empire
- Died: c. 92 Rome, Italy, Roman Empire

Sainthood
- Feast day: 26 April; 13 July (additional on Tridentine calendar)
- Venerated in: Catholic Church; Eastern Orthodox Church
- Canonized: by The Roman Catholic Church

Pope Anacletus (born c. AD 15 – died c. AD 92), also known as Cletus, was the bishop of Rome, following Peter and Linus. Anacletus served between c. AD 80 and his death, c. AD 92. Cletus was a Roman who, during his tenure as pope, ordained a number of priests and is traditionally credited with setting up about 25 parishes in Rome. Although the precise dates of his pontificate are uncertain, he "died a martyr, perhaps about 91". Cletus is mentioned in the Roman Canon of the mass; his feast day is April 26.

== Name and etymology ==
The name "Cletus" (Ancient Greek: Κλητος, romanized: Klētos) means "one who has been called", and "Anacletus" (Ancient Greek: Ἀνάκλητος, romanized: Anaklētos) means "one who has been called back". Also "Anencletus" (Ancient Greek: Ἀνάγκλητος) means "unimpeachable" or "blameless".

The Roman Martyrology mentions the pope as "Cletus". The Annuario Pontificio gives both forms. Eusebius, Irenaeus, Augustine of Hippo and Optatus all suggest that both names refer to the same individual, while the Liberian Catalogue counts Cletus and Anacletus as separate popes.

== Papacy ==
As with many of the early popes, little is known of Anacletus' pontificate. Earlier historical records are inconsistent in their usage of the names Cletus, Anacletus, and Anencletus and in the placement of these names in the order of succession. Generally, the order used by Irenaeus is used today, wherein Cletus and Anacletus refer to the same person, who succeeded Linus and preceded Clement. Traditionally, it was accepted that he reigned for 12 years, though the dates of that reign are questionable. The 2012 Annuario Pontificio states, "For the first two centuries, the dates of the start and the end of the pontificate are uncertain", before placing Anacletus' pontificate from 80 to 92. These are the years given by Eusebius and Jerome. However, 76 to 88 are also frequently cited.

According to tradition, Pope Anacletus divided Rome into twenty-five parishes. One of the few surviving records concerning his papacy mentions him as having ordained an uncertain number of priests.

Pope Anacletus was martyred, ending his pontificate. A tomb ascribed to Anacletus is located near St. Peter's tomb in the Vatican Necropolis field P, underneath St. Peter's Basilica. This tomb is located with tombs ascribed to Linus, Evaristus, Telesphorus, Hyginus, Pius I, Anicetus, and Victor I. Little epigraphic evidence exists to support the ascription of these tombs to the early popes. His name (as Cletus) is included in the Roman Canon of the Mass.

== Veneration ==
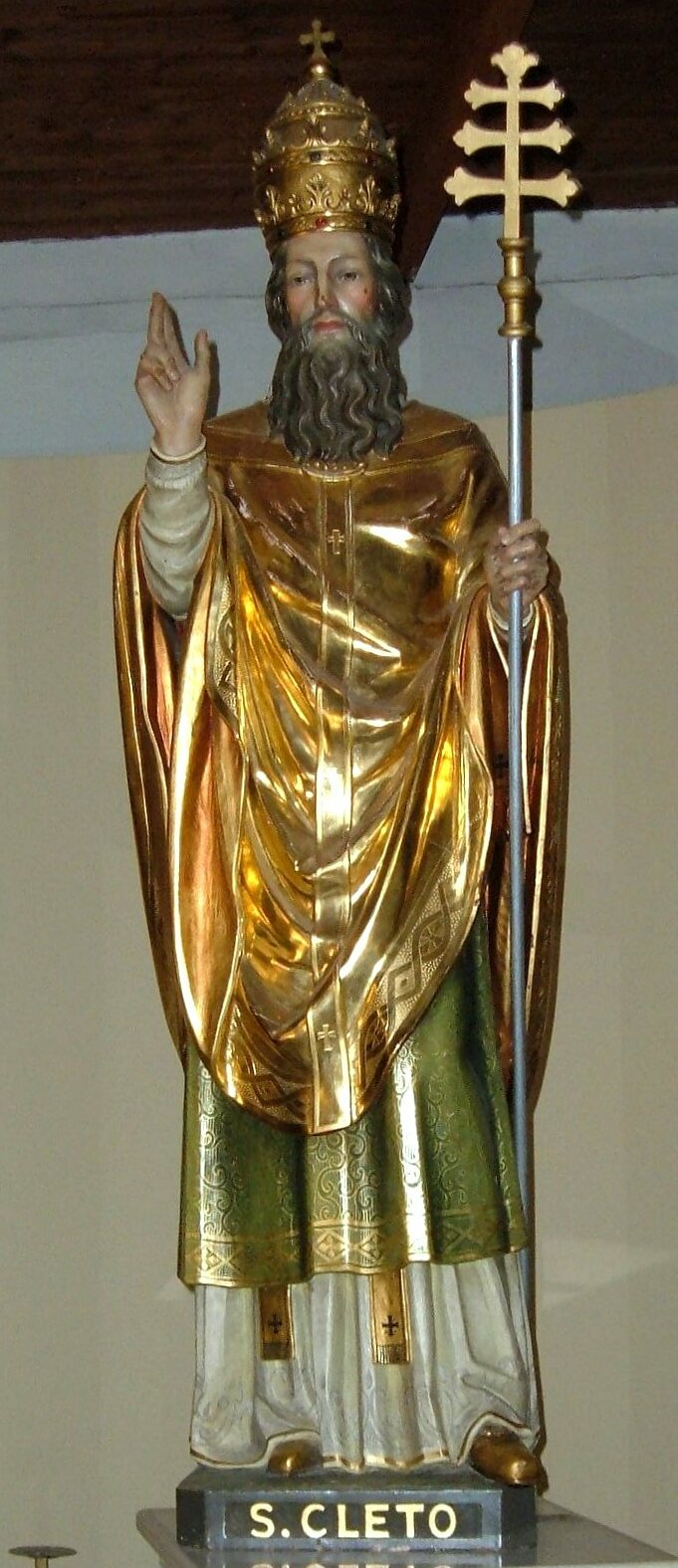
Statue of Pope Anacletus, from Church of San Cleto, in Rome

The Tridentine calendar reserved 26 April as the feast day of Saint Cletus, whom the church honoured jointly with Pope Marcellinus, and 13 July for solely Saint Anacletus. In 1960, Pope John XXIII, while keeping the 26 April feast, which mentions the saint under the name given to him in the Canon of the Mass, removed 13 July as a feast day for Saint Anacletus. The 14 February 1961 Instruction of the Congregation for Rites on the application to local calendars of Pope John XXIII's motu proprio Rubricarum instructum of 25 July 1960, decreed that "the feast of 'Saint Anacletus', on whatever ground and in whatever grade it is celebrated, is transferred to 26 April, under its right name, 'Saint Cletus'". Priests who celebrate Mass according to the General Roman Calendar of 1954 keep the July 13th feastday; but the feast has been removed from the General Roman Calendar since 1960, and as such is not kept even in the 1962 Missal. Although the day of his death is unknown, Saint Cletus continues to be listed in the Roman Martyrology among the saints of 26 April.

== In literature ==
In the Divine Comedy, Dante mentions him as being placed in the "Heaven of the Fixed Stars" (Paradiso 27.41).

== Notes ==
Catholic Church titles
Preceded by Linus	Bishop of Rome; 79–92	Succeeded by Clement I
