= Saint Clement's Day =

Feast of Saint Clement I

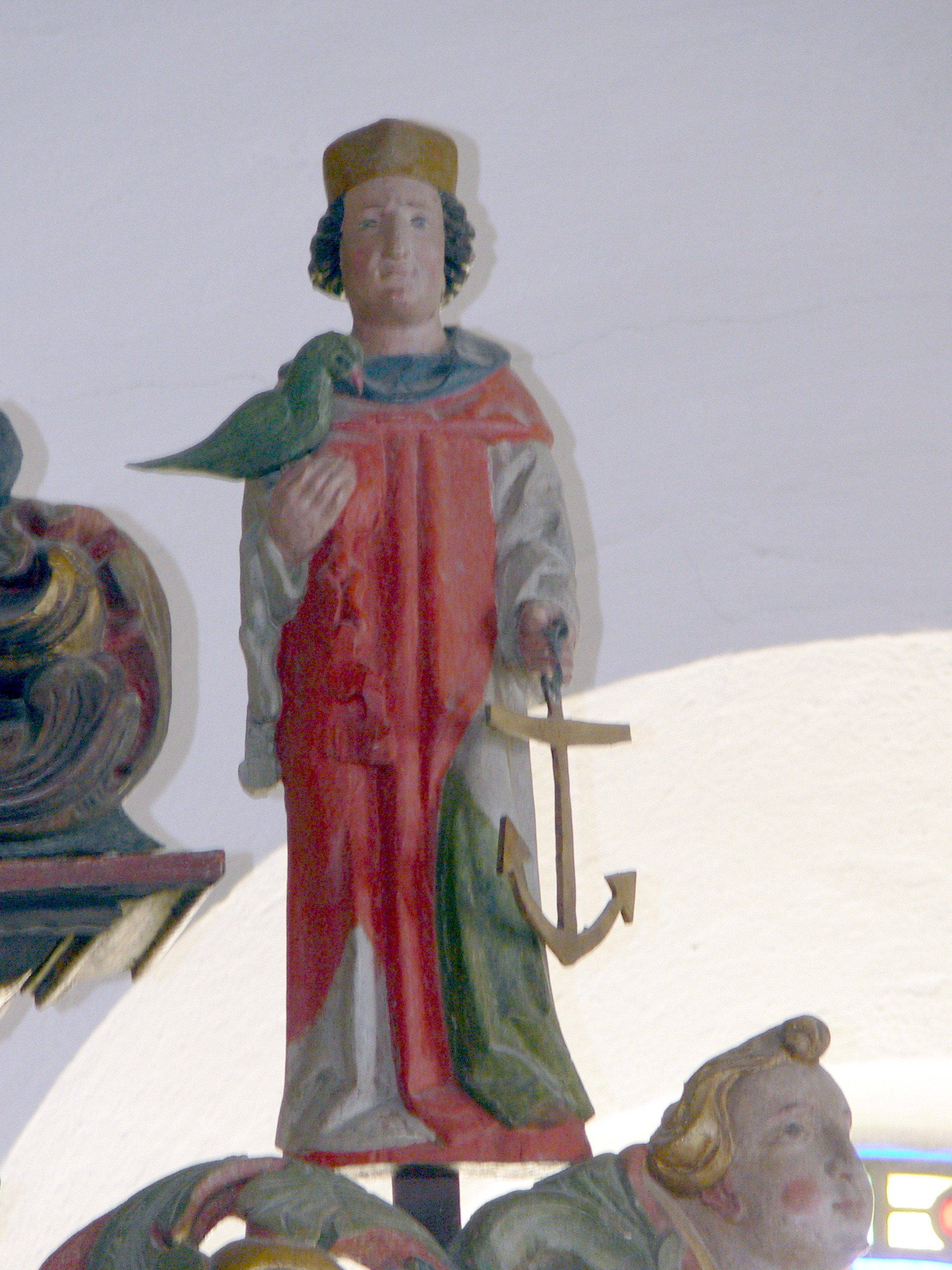
- Statue of Saint Clement
- Also called: Old Clem's Night
- Observed by: Christian cultures
- Type: Christian
- Significance: special holiday for metalworkers and blacksmiths
- Observances: clementing for apples and pears; processions and effigies associated with "Old Clem"; the firing of the anvil
- Date: 23 November
- Next time: 23 November 2025
- Frequency: annual

Saint Clement's Day was traditionally, and in some places still is, celebrated on 23 November, a festival between Halloween and Christmas. Pope Clement I is the patron saint of metalworkers and blacksmiths, and so these workers traditionally enjoyed a holiday on his feast day.

== Festivities ==
"Old Clem's Night" started literally with a bang and showers of sparks during the ritual "firing of the anvil." The smith packed gunpowder into a small hole in an anvil, and then struck it soundly with a hammer, causing a small explosion. Anvil firing was also a test of the anvil's durability: weak anvils would break under pressure, and had to be re forged.

The smith, or apprentice, dressed up in wig, mask and cloak to represent "Old Clem", led a procession of smiths through the streets, stopping at taverns along the way. Boisterous singing was followed by demands for free beer or money for the "Clem feast". Traditional toasts included "True hearts and sound bottoms, check shirts and leather aprons" and "Here's to old Vulcan, as bold as a lion, A large shop and no iron, A big hearth and no coal, And a large pair of bellowses full of holes".

In the nineteenth century at Bramber in West Sussex an effigy of Old Clem was propped up in the public bar while the smiths enjoyed their dinner. This was rounded off with the blacksmiths' anthem, "Twanky Dillo":

Health to the jolly blacksmith, the best of all fellows Who works at his anvil while the boy blows the bellows!

=== Urban festivities ===
Such celebrations were not restricted to rural areas. Ironworkers' apprentices at Woolwich Dockyard disguised one of their fellows to play the part of Old Clem. Wielding a hammer and tongs, the tools of his trade, he was carried aloft by his comrades through the town. In the streets and taverns apprentices shouted and sang the praises of Old Clem and repeatedly toasted his name: "To the memory of Old Clem, and prosperity to all his descendants!" Again, the allegedly generous cash donations received paid for the apprentices' holiday dinner.

In some rural areas smiths visited homes to beg for beer or wine. To encourage largesse, sometimes an iron pot was passed around; the day was represented on old calendars with the figure of a cauldron. This custom expanded into the visiting custom of "clementing" or "clemening" whereby children called door-to door requesting apples, pears and other sweet treats in exchange for singing traditional songs associated with the night, such as "Clementsing, clementsing, apples and pears", or "Clemany clemany clemany mine, a roasted apple and some good red wine!"

The old begging song "Cattern and Clemen, be here be here! Some of your apples and some of your beer!" refers to the combination with the "catterning" custom two days later on St Katherine's Day (25 November). Again children sang for fruit, nuts, or money until 1541 when Henry VIII passed a law forbidding children to beg in this way within the London churches of Saints Clement, Catherine, and Nicholas. This rule did not apply outside the church buildings, and the custom cheerfully continued.

== Ancient origins ==
Many legends surround Saint Clement, some suggest he was the first man to refine iron from ore, and to shoe a horse. Clementine customs may be survivals of earlier pagan rituals, a confusion of Saint Clement with the early Saxon Wayland, or Wayland the smith, a mythical metalworker. He shares this feast day, which marks the beginning of winter, with the saint.

== Literary references ==
In Charles Dickens's Great Expectations Miss Havisham insists Pip sing for her and her ward Estella, and Pip responds with a ditty from Joe's forge "that imitated the measure of beating upon iron": "... hammer boys round – Old Clem! With a thump and a sound – Old Clem! Beat it out, beat it out – Old Clem! With a clink for the stout – Old Clem! Blow the fire, blow the fire – Old Clem! Roaring dryer, soaring higher – Old Clem!"

== Modern survival of the custom ==
Clementing had more or less died out by the 20th century, but Saint Clement's Day is still celebrated in a few rural parishes in England, although nowadays donations tend to be for charity. At Burwash, East Sussex, an effigy of Old Clem is still mounted above the door of an inn for the annual Clem Feast every 23 November. Similarly, Old Clem and Saint Dunstan, another blacksmith saint, said to have pulled off the devil's nose with hot tongs, used to meet together on the same day at nearby Mayfield accompanied by blacksmiths, devils and morris dancing, but sadly this custom has fallen into abeyance. A local smith played Old Clem for the day and was pulled around in a cart collecting money and firing off his anvil. In Hastings Saint Clement and Saint Catherine (whose feast day is 24 November) are pulled around on a cart in a procession from St Clement's Church, firing his anvil, singing songs and selling Cattern cakes. Ironworkers gather from all over the Britain to celebrate Saint Clement's Day at Finch Foundry near Okehampton in Devon. Smiths demonstrate their art and display decorative ironware as part of a national competition, and they and the public can enjoy Morris dancing, mince pies and mulled wine.

Saint Clement is also commemorated every April at St Clement Danes church in London, a modern clementine custom/revival. Reverend William Pennington-Bickford initiated the service in 1919 to celebrate the restoration of the famous church bells and carillon, which he had had altered to ring out the popular nursery rhyme (although this might refer to a different church). This special service for children ends with the distribution of oranges and lemons to the boys and girls.
