= Rhode (Hermas) =

Supposed master of Hermas in the Shepherd of Hermas

Rhode (in ancient Greek: Ῥόδη) or the young woman (in ancient Greek: κόρη) is a Christian who is one of the main characters in the Greek and Christian novel known as The Shepherd of Hermas. Her name and historical existence are far from certain.

== Novel ==
=== Onomastic issues ===
The name of this character is difficult to restore because it is located in a lacuna in the surviving manuscripts of the text. When the novel was discovered by Adolf Hilgenfeld in the 19th century, he proposed the reading Ῥόδη (Rhódē) in the lacuna and thus attributed this name to the character. However, in more recent times, this reading has been questioned; the lacunar passage does not seem to give an obvious name. More recent scholars have proposed the reading κόρη (kórē) instead, which means "young woman".

=== Narrative of the novel ===
In The Shepherd of Hermas, she is presented as a former mistress of Hermas, her former slave, whom she supposedly freed. However, if the lacuna is restored differently, she would not be his former mistress but a fellow slave. In any case, in The Shepherd, as in other Ancient Greek novels, this female character is central. In the story, the wandering Hermas encounters her, naked, bathing, and desires her. This initial sin is the catalyst for the novel, with Hermas subsequently receiving visions, including from Rhode, never named as such, urging him to repent.
