= Epistle to the Alexandrians =

Pseudepigraphical epistle

The Epistle to the Alexandrians is a pseudepigraphical epistle attributed to Paul the Apostle that is mentioned in the Muratorian fragment, one of the earliest lists of the canonical texts of the New Testament. The anonymous author of the Muratorian canon considered this epistle as spurious, along with the Epistle to the Laodiceans, and both of them are stated to have been "forged in Paul's name to [further] the heresy of Marcion." Its text has been lost and nothing is known about its content.

Theologian Theodor Zahn believed himself to have found a fragment of the Epistle to the Alexandrians in the shape of a lesson – a liturgical Epistle – in the (eighth century) Sacramentary and Lectionary of Bobbio (Paris Bib cat., Lat. 13246). It is headed Epistle of Paul the Apostle to the Colossians, but it is not from that letter or any other known Pauline epistle. Other scholars consider that it is simply an alternative title to the Epistle to the Hebrews, but they have been unable to convince their colleagues. M. R. James argued that the word 'fincte' might be a scribal error, as many others in the Muratorian Fragment, and that it should be singular instead of plural, and so only the letter to the Alexandrians should be associated with the Marcionites, not the one to the Laodiceans. Joseph Lightfoot suggested there was hiatus after 'Pauli nomine', and that 'fincte' does not apply to the epistles to the Laodiceans nor the Alexandrians, but to mutilated epistles of Marcion, so that the author considered neither to be a forgery.

== See also ==
- Authorship of the Pauline epistles
- Development of the New Testament canon
- Marcionism § Marcionite canon
- Pauline epistles
