= Pope Pius I =

Head of the Catholic Church from c. 140 to c. 154

Pope Saint Pius I
- Bishop of Rome
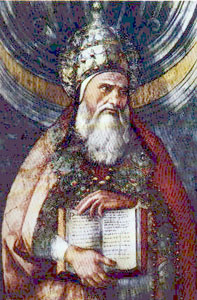
- 15th century portrayal of Pope Pius I by Pietro Perugino
- Church: Early Church
- Papacy began: c. 140
- Papacy ended: c. 154
- Predecessor: Hyginus
- Successor: Anicetus

Personal details
- Born: Pius c. late 1st century Aquileia, Italy, Roman Empire
- Died: c. 154 Rome, Italy, Roman Empire
- Parents: Rufinus

Sainthood
- Feast day: 11 July
- Venerated in: Catholic Church; Eastern Orthodox Church

Pius I (Italian: Pio I, Greek: Πίος) was the bishop of Rome from c. 140 to his death c. 154, according to the Annuario Pontificio. His dates are listed as 142 or 146 to 157 or 161, respectively. He is considered to have opposed both the Valentinians and Gnostics during his papacy. He is considered a saint by the Eastern Orthodox Church and the Catholic Church with a feast day on 11 July, but it is unclear if he died as a martyr.

== Early life ==
Pius is believed to have been born at Aquileia, in Northern Italy, during the late 1st century. His father was an Italian called Rufinus, and according to the Liber Pontificalis was also a native of Aquileia. According to the 2nd-century Muratorian Canon and the Liberian Catalogue, Pius was the brother of Hermas, author of the text known as The Shepherd of Hermas. Its author identifies himself as a former slave, a fact which has led to speculation that both Hermas and Pius were freedmen. However Hermas' statement that he was a slave may just mean that he belonged to a low-ranking plebeian family.

== Pontificate ==
According to Catholic tradition, Pius I governed the church in the middle of the 2nd century during the reigns of the Emperors Antoninus Pius and Marcus Aurelius. He is held to be the ninth successor of Saint Peter, and to have decreed that Easter should only be kept on a Sunday. Although he is said to have ordered the publication of the Liber Pontificalis, in fact compilation of that document was not started before the beginning of the 6th century. Pius is also said to have built one of the oldest churches in Rome, Santa Pudenziana.

Justin Martyr taught Christian doctrine in Rome during the pontificate of Pius I but the account of Justin's martyrdom does not name Pius. Given the brevity of the account this is hardly remarkable. The heretics Valentinus, Cerdon, and Marcion visited Rome in Pius' time, and he is believed to have excommunicated both groups. Catholic apologists see this as an argument for the primacy of the Roman See during the 2nd century.

There is some conjecture that Pius was a martyr in Rome, a conjecture that entered earlier editions of the Roman Breviary. The study that had produced the 1969 revision of the General Roman Calendar stated that there were no grounds for his being considered a martyr, and he is not presented as such in the current Roman Martyrology.

== Feast day ==
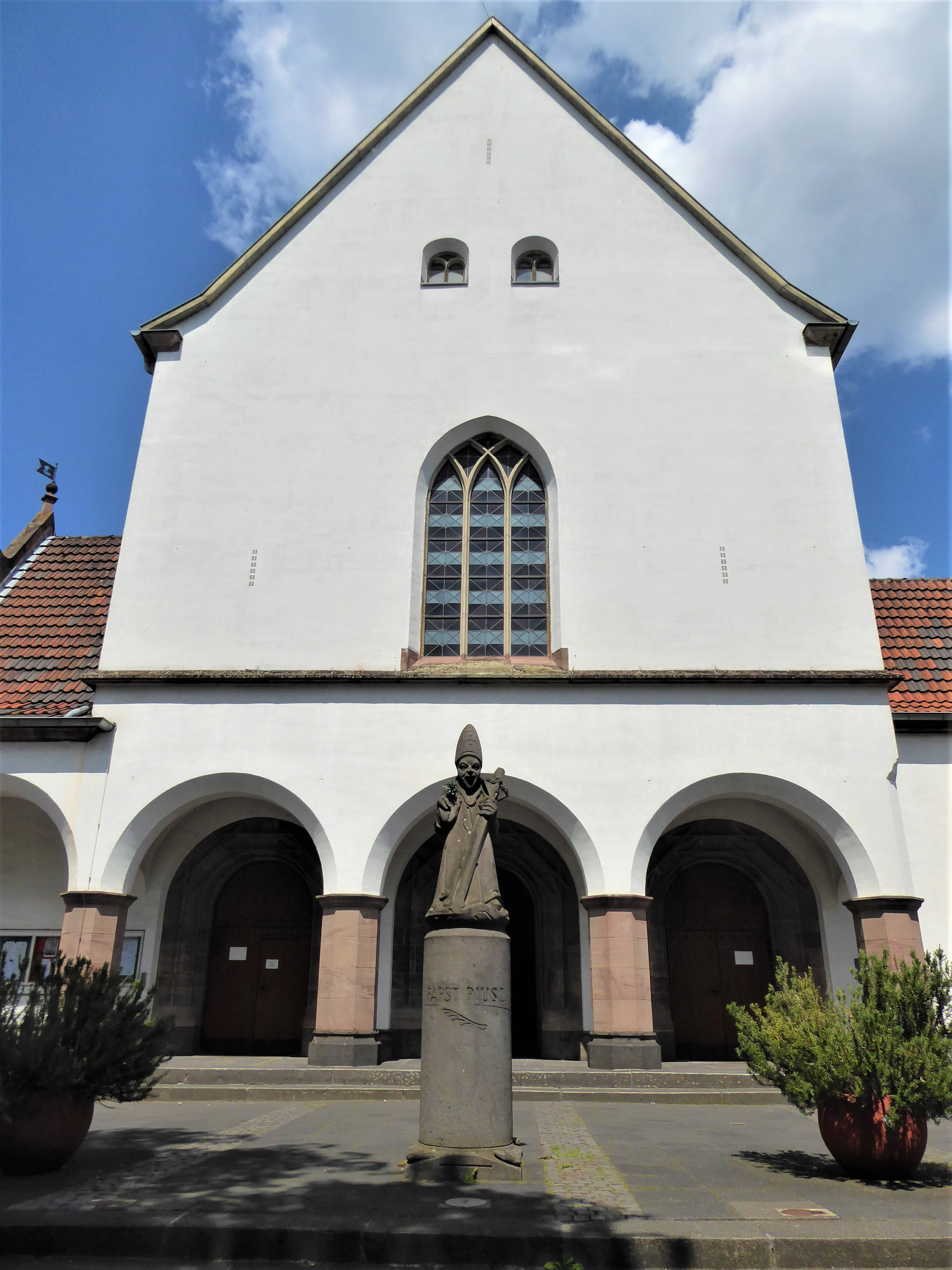
Church dedicated to St Pius in Zollstock, Germany, with statue of the saint

Pius I's feast day is 11 July. In the Tridentine calendar it was given the rank of "Simple" and celebrated as the feast of a martyr. The rank of the feast was reduced to a Commemoration in the 1955 General Roman Calendar of Pope Pius XII and the General Roman Calendar of 1960.

== See also ==
- List of Catholic saints
- List of popes

Titles of the Great Christian Church
Preceded by Hyginus	Bishop of Rome; 140–154	Succeeded by Anicetus
