= Thomas Lopton Campbell Jr. =

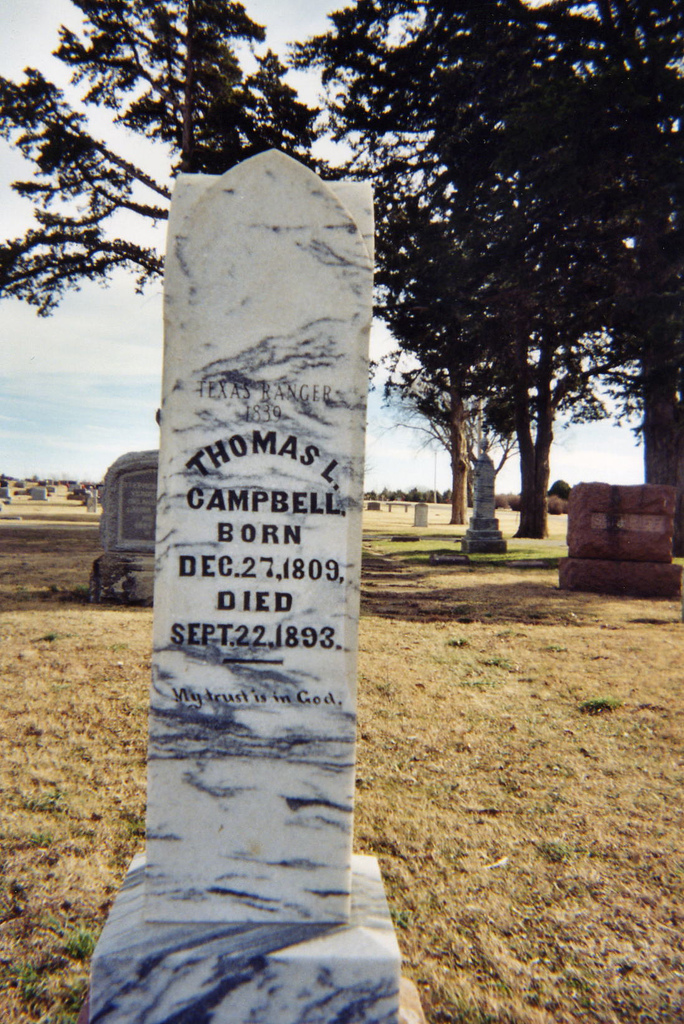
- Born: December 27, 1809; Oneida County, New York (US)
- Died: September 22, 1893 (aged 83); Guthrie, Oklahoma
- Military career
- Allegiance: United States of America; Republic of Texas
- Branch: Texas Rangers, Republic of Texas Militia
- Service years: 1839-1861
- Unit: volunteer army
- Conflicts: Black Hawk War Mexican-American War East Texas Indian War

Thomas Lopton Campbell Jr. (December 27, 1809 – September 22, 1893) was a nineteenth-century American pioneer and Texas Ranger. Campbell pioneered the American frontier in New York, Ohio, Illinois, Missouri, Texas, Kansas, and Oklahoma. He fought in the Black Hawk War and served as a Texas Ranger from 1839 until the secession of Texas from the Union. Campbell, along with Texas Governor Sam Houston, was a prominent spokesman for remaining in the Union prior to the Civil War. Targeted as the most widely known Union supporter in the Austin area, on the day Texas voted to secede from the Union Campbell was publicly humiliated on the streets of the Capitol when a crowd of Secessionists held him captive and forced him to "fire" the anvils in celebration of secession. Campbell and his family left Texas the next day to run supply routes for the Union and pioneer lands in Missouri and Kansas. Later, at the age of 79, Campbell would pioneer a claim in the Land Run of 1889 in Oklahoma.

== Early life ==
Thomas Lopton Campbell Jr. was born on December 27, 1809, in Oneida Co., New York. His father, Thomas Lopton Campbell, had served in the War of 1812 and his grandfather, John Campbell of the Argyll Campbells of Scotland, was a soldier in the American Revolution and a member of Clan Campbell. No record of his mother exists but "family tradition in the Henry Clay Campbell family says that either Thomas Sr.'s wife or the wife of ... John Campbell was of Indian blood." After the War of 1812, while Campbell was a boy, his family took flatboats down the Ohio River to pioneer in lands being settled in southern Ohio. The Campbells settled along the west bank of the Hocking River in 1823.

In 1831, Campbell married Clarissa Witter. The Witter family had arrived in America in 1639 and had suffered religious persecution at the hands of the Puritans, fighting for civil liberties in the New World. Thomas and Clarissa were always on the frontier, traveling in covered wagons west and giving birth to 12 children - three sets of twins included.

== Texas Pioneer Family and Texas Ranger ==
After their marriage Thomas and Clarissa followed the frontier westward, first to Illinois where Thomas fought in the Black Hawk War, and then to the Republic of Texas. The Campbell family arrived in Upshur County of northeast Texas in early 1839. They had followed the Mississippi River to the mouth of the Red River then up the Red River across Louisiana. They settled on the west fork of Glade Creek about six miles (9.7 km) North of the Sabine River. Campbell served as a Texas Ranger during the East Texas Indian War in July of his first year in Texas. He subsequently served as a Ranger during the Mexican-American War and when emergencies arose, serving stints of three to six months at a time.

Due to their distaste for the predominance of slave trade in East Texas, the Campbells left Texas for Missouri in 1847. Traveling in wagons, they crossed the Indian Territory up the Old Texas Road to Pettis County in north central Missouri. They stayed only a short time before returning to Texas and immediately moved west to the Austin, Texas area. Here they settled on Walnut Creek above the Colorado River and, on December 7, 1849, gave birth to twins - a boy Lafayette and a girl California Campbell.

Campbell was a farmer and cattleman. The 25th brand registered in Travis County belonged to Campbell and is the numeral 5. The family lived in the Austin area where Thomas was a prominent cattleman and Texas Ranger from 1849 until the secession of Texas from the Union in 1861. During this time he traveled back and forth across the Indian Territory to Missouri and east Texas. It was during one of these journeys back to east Texas for a reunion with her brother and sister that Clarissa died and was buried in an unmarked grave at the base of a pine tree by the trail. The family returned to Missouri in 1855, stayed there 4 years and then relocated south of Austin in 1859.

== Union supporter In Texas ==
When the Campbells returned to the Austin area in 1859 the pre-civil war unrest had divided the citizens into three camps. Some advocated siding with the Union and Campbell was one of the most vocal supporters of this group. Others wanted to join the Southern Confederacy. Still others demanded that Texas resume its independence as a Republic. The question was hotly debated during 1860 throughout the state with Governor Sam Houston and Thomas L. Campbell, two of the strongest supporters of staying with the Union. However, on February 23, 1861, the state of Texas voted to join the Confederacy.

On that day Campbell and his eleven-year-old son Lafayette were in Austin. A group of Secessionists celebrating in the streets of Austin spotted Thomas and Lafayette. They immediately seized Thomas and held him captive all day, forcing him to "fire the anvils" as they celebrated the entry of Texas into the Confederate states.

From "Tumbleweed Treck":

To "fire the anvil" meant that two large anvils were brought from a blacksmith shop. One was placed on a box or stump. At one side on top of the anvil was a hole used by the smithy to place the handle of a chisel for certain operations such as the cutting of a metal bar. This hole was filled with gunpowder and then the second anvil was placed atop the first with just a corner of the hole exposed. Then a short trail of gunpowder was poured leading to the hole. Next, a red-hot iron from the coals of a nearby fire would be touched to the powder trail. A loud boom would result and the top anvil would be blown into the air and fall to the ground as the powder exploded. The milling crowd cheered with every boom.

All day long smoke from the gunpowder explosions filled the town. The booming of the anvils, the shouts and screams of the crowd, the frightened startled horses, the captive Ranger firing the anvils, all lay before the eyes of eleven-year-old Lafayette. At the end of the day Tom drove Lafayette home and ordered his family to pack their belongings for a long trip. They loaded up the wagons and headed North. Tom's oldest son David Witter Campbell drove the herd South to Mexico in order to deny the Confederacy use of the cattle. Thomas L. Campbell was 51 years old. His oldest son Witter was 29. The youngest, Texanna was 8 years old. The family would not learn what happened to Witter for over four years.

== Missouri During the Civil War ==
The Campbell family never returned to Texas. Along the way North one of the sons, Henry, went off in search of a few missing horses and disappeared. Two of the daughters had stayed in Austin with their husbands to join the Confederacy. After a long hard journey the family settled seven or eight miles (13 km) south of Sedalia, Missouri. Here they found the turmoil and conflict of the Civil War even more intense than it was in Texas. Clashes between Union and Confederate soldiers were frequent. Further, Missouri was the center of roving guerrilla bands of outlaws - some dressed in military uniforms - raiding, looting, and plundering the countryside.

Thomas and Lafayette drove supply wagons for the Union as the family persevered in Sedalia during the war. Thomas's son, George Washington Campbell, joined the Union forces when he turned 18 and served in the Missouri Militia and Missouri Volunteer Cavalry until his discharge in September 1865. During his service George was hospitalized in St. Louis, Missouri where he somehow found his brother David Witter Campbell. David had successfully driven the Campbell herd south into Mexico where it had been confiscated by the Mexican police. He took a ship around the Gulf and a river boat up the Mississippi to St. Louis where he enlisted in the Union army.

In 1866 and 1867 disease swept through Missouri. A cholera epidemic in 1866 took as many as 200 persons a day in St. Louis alone. In 1867 Lafayette's twin sister California (or "Forney" as she had always been called) became ill and died at the age of 18.

== Pioneering Kansas and The Little House On The Prairie ==
In 1870, Campbell and his family left Sedalia and moved to Cherokee County in the southeastern corner of Kansas. Disgusted here by garrisons of soldiers swindling and stealing land for the railroads, Thomas moved his family once again in 1871 to the area around Sedan, Kansas in Chautauqua County. It was during this time that the family lived near the Ingalls family who later became famous in the Little House books. Now in his 60s Thomas L. Campbell had seen the frontier from New York to Athens County in Ohio to Missouri and Texas and now Kansas. More pioneering was to come.

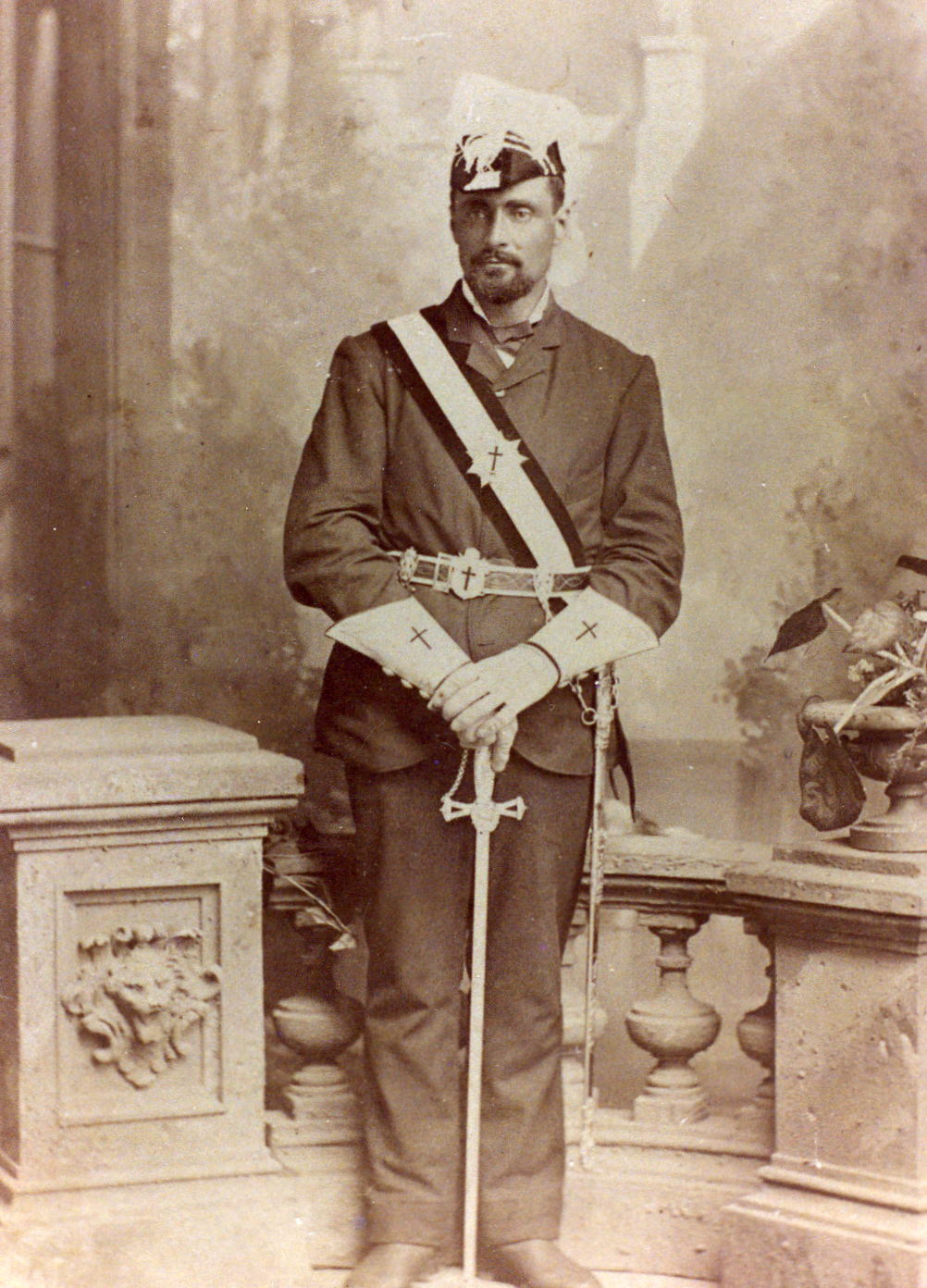
Lafayette Campbell

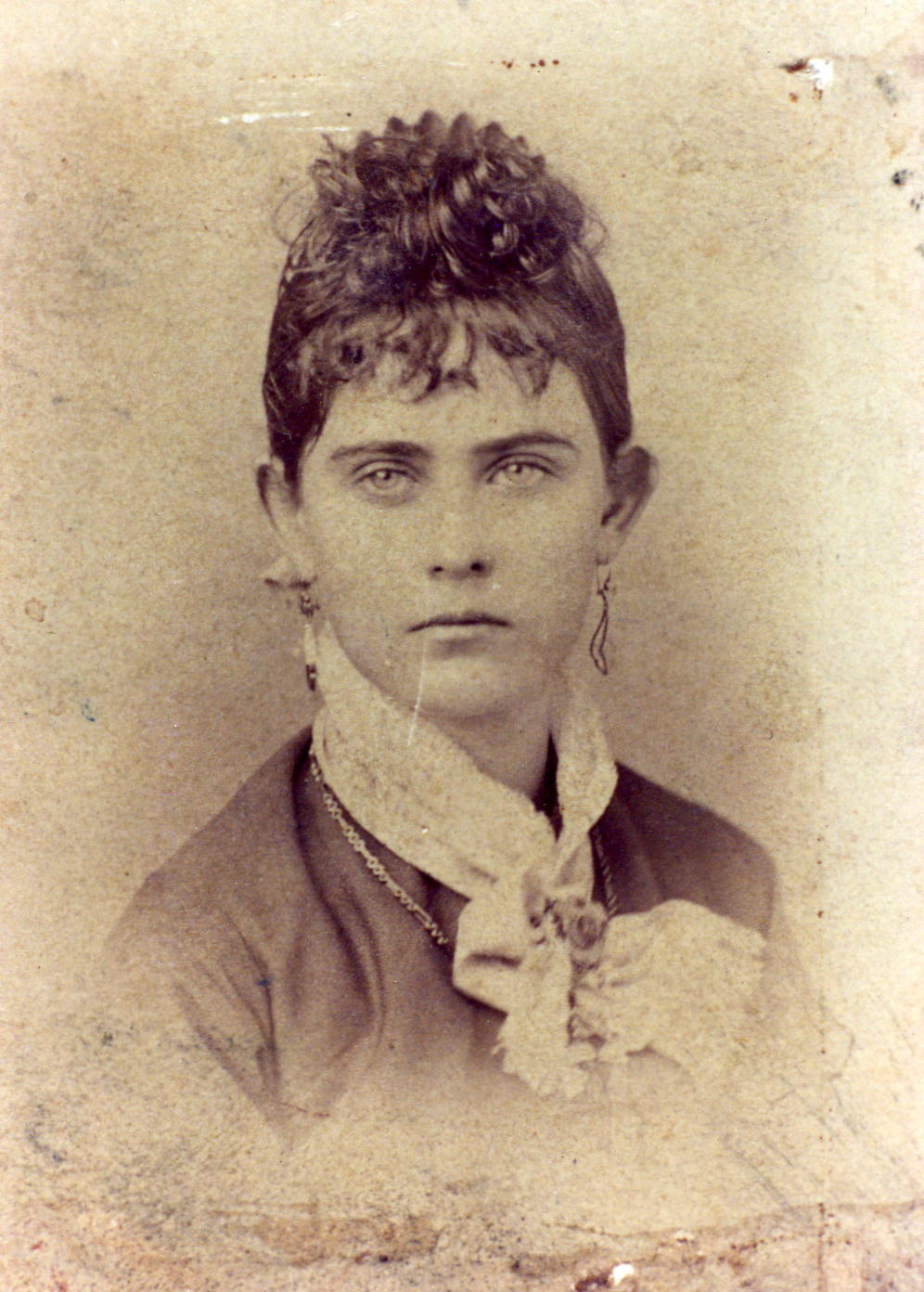
Ida Alice Crews (Allie)

In 1883 the 32-year-old Lafayette would marry Ida Alice Crews (Allie), an 18-year-old native Kansan and school teacher. Allie taught school and Lafayette would give lectures at the local Literary Society meetings. He also taught at the Mt. Vernon School as most of the members of the family taught at one time or another.

== Oklahoma Land Run and Cowboy Flat ==
News of the "deep red loam" just south in The Unassigned Lands of Indian Territory often reached southern Kansas and on April 22, 1889, Lafayette Campbell rode in the land run, staking a claim in an area that has since become known as "Cowboy Flat" about 8 miles (13 km) northeast of what would become the territorial capital of Guthrie, Oklahoma. Thomas L. Campbell drove a team of horses hitched to a wagon and staked a claim just south of that of his son. It was said the grass in Cowboy Flat was tall enough to tie the tops together over the back of a horse. The first land broken in the Antelope Creek area was in April 1889 when Lafayette plowed 5 acres (20,000 m^{2}) for his father then plowed a field on his own claim. Lafayette spent the summer building a log cabin for his family and a half-dugout home for his father Thomas Lopton Campbell now 80 years old and pioneering still.

In 1892 word came of Henry, the son who had gone off in search of the missing horses back in 1861 during the Campbell's trek north out of Texas. Henry Clay Campbell was alive and living in Greer County, now in southwestern Oklahoma but claimed by Texas at that time. Henry had served in the Confederate army during the Civil War. This was great news for the family - Lafayette and George Washington rode 300 miles (480 km) south for a reunion with their brother who had been lost and thought dead for 30 years.

On September 22, 1893, Campbell died at the age of 83. He is buried in the historic Summit View Cemetery in Guthrie, Oklahoma where his headstone reads "Texas Ranger 1839, Thomas L. Campbell, Born Dec. 27, 1809, Died Sept. 22, 1893, My Trust Is In God"
