= Pope Linus =

Head of the Catholic Church from c. 68 to c. 80

Pope Saint Linus
- Bishop of Rome
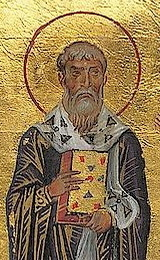
- 10th-century Byzantine portrait of Linus from Menologion of Basil II in the Vatican Library
- Church: Early Church
- Papacy began: c. 68
- Papacy ended: c. 80
- Predecessor: Peter
- Successor: Anacletus

Orders
- Ordination: c. 67 by Paul the Apostle

Personal details
- Born: c. 10 Volterra, Italy, Roman Empire
- Died: c. 80 Rome, Italy, Roman Empire
- Buried: possibly Vatican Hill
- Parents: Herculanus

Sainthood
- Feast day: 23 September
- Venerated in: All Christian denominations that venerate saints
- Canonized: Pre-Congregation
- Attributes: Papal vestments and pallium
- Patronage: Patronage list

Pope Linus (/ˈlaɪnəs/; Greek: Λῖνος, Linos; died c. 80) was the bishop of Rome from c. 68 to his death in 80. He is generally regarded as the second bishop of Rome, after Saint Peter. As with nearly all the early popes, he was canonized.

According to Irenaeus, Linus is the same person as the one mentioned in the New Testament. Linus is mentioned in the valediction of the Second Epistle to Timothy (2 Timothy 4:21) as being with Paul the Apostle in Rome near the end of Paul's life.

== Background ==
The earliest reference to the episcopate of Linus was Irenaeus, who in c. 180 wrote that "the blessed apostles, then, having founded and built up the Church, committed into the hands of Linus the office of the episcopate".

According to the earliest succession lists of bishops of Rome, passed down by Irenaeus and Hegesippus and attested by the historian Eusebius, Linus was entrusted with his office by the apostles Peter and Paul after they had established the Christian church in Rome. By this reckoning he might be considered therefore the first pope, but from the late 2nd or early 3rd century the convention began of regarding Peter as the first pope.

Jerome described Linus as "the first after Peter to be in charge of the Roman Church" and Eusebius described him as "the first to receive the episcopate of the church at Rome, after the martyrdom of Paul and Peter". Optatus and Augustine likewise list Linus immediately after Peter, while Epiphanius places him after Peter and Paul.

John Chrysostom wrote that "this Linus, some say, was second bishop of the Church of Rome after Peter", while the Liberian Catalogue described Peter as the first bishop of Rome and Linus as his successor in the same office.

The Liber Pontificalis also enumerated Linus as the second bishop of Rome after Peter, and stated that Peter consecrated two bishops, Linus and Anacletus, for the priestly service of the community, while devoting himself instead to prayer and preaching, and that it was Clement I to whom he entrusted the universal Church and whom he appointed as his successor. Tertullian also wrote of Clement as the successor of Peter. Jerome named Clement as "the fourth bishop of Rome after Peter, if indeed the second was Linus and the third Anacletus, although most of the Latins think that Clement was second after the apostle".

The Apostolic Constitutions note that Linus, whom Paul the Apostle consecrated, was the first bishop of Rome and that he was succeeded by Clement I, whom Peter the Apostle ordained and consecrated.

== Episcopate ==
The chronology of the early popes is heavily disputed. Eusebius and Jerome dated Linus' episcopate between the years 68 and 80. The Liberian Catalogue and the Liber Pontificalis date it as 56 to 67, during the reign of Nero. This is most likely a mistake, as all four sources give Peter an episcopate of 25 years in Rome, and the Liber Pontificalis even records that Peter died 38 years after Jesus' death, that is, 67–68. The Catholic Encyclopedia gives his years as c. 64–76 or c. 67–79.

Linus is named in the valediction of the Second Epistle to Timothy. In that epistle, Linus is noted as being with Paul the Apostle in Rome near the end of Paul's life. Irenaeus stated that this is the same Linus who became Bishop of Rome.

According to the Liber Pontificalis, Linus was an Italian born in Volterra in Tuscany. His father's name was recorded as Herculanus. The Apostolic Constitutions denominated his mother Claudia; immediately after the name Linus in 2 Timothy 4:21 a Claudia is named, but the Bible does not explicitly identify Claudia as Linus' mother. According to the Liber Pontificalis, Linus decreed that women should cover their heads in church, created the first 15 bishops, and died a martyr. It dated his burial as 23 September, on which date he is still commemorated. His name is included in the Roman Canon of the Mass.

With respect to Linus' purported decree prescribing the covering of women's heads, J.P. Kirsch commented in the Catholic Encyclopedia that "without doubt this decree is apocryphal, and copied by the author of the Liber Pontificalis from Paul's First Epistle to the Corinthians (11:5) and arbitrarily attributed to the first successor of the Apostle in Rome. The statement made in the same source, that Linus suffered martyrdom, cannot be proved and is improbable. For between Nero and Domitian there is no mention of any persecution of the Roman Church; and Irenaeus (1. c., III, iv, 3) from among the early Roman bishops designates only Telesphorus as a glorious martyr." The Roman Martyrology does not categorize Linus as a martyr as does the Liber Pontificalis; the current entry in the former regarding him states: "At Rome, the commemoration of Saint Linus, Pope, to whom, as Saint Irenaeus narrates, the blessed Apostles entrusted the responsibility of the episcopate of the Church founded in the City, and whom the blessed Paul the Apostle mentions as a companion of his."

== Legacy ==
A tomb that Torrigio discovered in Saint Peter's Basilica in 1615 and which was inscribed with the letters LINVS was assumed to be the tomb of Pope Linus. However, a note by Torrigio records that these were merely the final five letters of some unknown longer name, such as "Aquilinus" or "Anullinus". A letter on the martyrdom of Peter and Paul was attributed to Linus, but in fact it was determined to date to the 6th century. The Liber Pontificalis asserts that Linus was buried on the Vatican Hill adjacent to Peter the Apostle in what is now known as the Vatican Necropolis beneath Saint Peter's Basilica in Vatican City.

The city of Saint-Lin–Laurentides in Canada is named in his honour.

== See also ==
- List of Catholic saints
- List of popes
- Papal selection before 1059

Catholic Church titles
Preceded by Peter	Bishop of Rome; 67/68–79/80	Succeeded by Anacletus
