= Francesco Maria Torrigio =

Italian archaeologist

Francesco Maria Torrigio (1580 – 1649) was an Italian ecclesiastical historian and erudite scholar.

== Biography ==
Torrigio was born in Rome, ordained, and became a canon in the church of San Nicola in Carcere. He participated in and wrote about the 1615 inspection and exhumation of tombs in the crypt of St Peter's Basilica. This apparently proceeded under the supervision of the archpriest of St Peter's, Giovanni Evangelista Cardinal Pallotta. One of the sarcophagi had the lettering Linus and was attributed to belong to St Linus (pope from AD 67-76). However, later scholars have surmised that these were only a portion of a longer name, for example Aquilinus. Vatican scholars of the time sought physical evidence that the papacy was linked to St Peter's since the first century.

== Works ==
The publications of Torrigio, include:

- Torriggio, Francesco Maria (1618). Le sacre Grotte Vaticane. Viterbo.
- Torriggio, Francesco Maria (1643). Historia del Martirio di S Teodoro Soldato seguito en la citta d'Amasia. Rome. Note: refers to Theodore Tiron of Amasya.
- Torriggio, Francesco Maria (1644). I sacri trofei romani del trionfante prencipe degli apostoli san Pietro gloriosissimo.. Rome. Note: overlaps with Le Sacre Grotte.
- Torriggio, Francesco Maria (1649). Historica narratione della chiesa parocchiale, et archiconfraternità del santissimo corpo di Christo posto in S. Giacomo apostolo in Borgo. Rome.
- Torriggio, Francesco Maria (1641). Historia della veneranda immagine di Maria Vergine posta nella chiesa del monastero delle RR. monache di Santi Sisto, e Domenico di Roma. Rome. Note: refers to icon in Santi Domenico e Sisto.
