= Clement of Rome =

Bishop of Rome from 88 to 99

Pope Saint Clement I
- Bishop of Rome
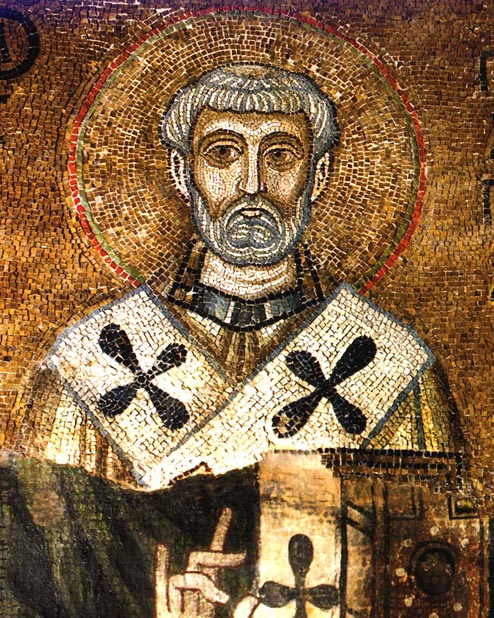
- c. 1000 portrayal at Saint Sophia's Cathedral, Kyiv
- Church: Early Church
- Papacy began: c. 92
- Papacy ended: c. 100
- Predecessor: Anacletus
- Successor: Evaristus

Orders
- Consecration: by Saint Peter

Personal details
- Born: Rome, Italy, Roman Empire
- Died: c. 100 Chersonesus, Taurica, Bosporan Kingdom, Crimea, Roman Empire

Sainthood
- Feast day: 23 November (Catholic Church, Lutheran Church); 24 November (most Byzantine Churches); 25 November (Russian Orthodox Church); 29 Hathor (Oriental Orthodox Churches)
- Venerated in: Catholic Church; Anglican Communion; Lutheran Church; Eastern Orthodoxy; Oriental Orthodoxy; Church of the East
- Attributes: Papal vestments; Mariner's cross; Anchor tied to the side; Palm of martyrdom
- Patronage: Angono, Rizal; Mariners; Stone-cutters
- Shrines: Basilica di San Clemente, Rome; Church of St Clement, Nantes; St Clement's Church, Moscow; Diocesan Shrine and Parish of St. Clement, Angono, Rizal, Philippines

Clement of Rome (Latin: Clemens Romanus; Ancient Greek: Κλήμης Ῥώμης, romanized: Klēmēs Rōmēs; died c. 100), also known as Pope Clement I, was the bishop of Rome in the late first century. He is considered to be the first of the Apostolic Fathers of the Church.

Little is known about Clement's life. Tertullian claimed that Clement was ordained by Saint Peter. Early church lists place him as the second or third (Note: Campbell 1907 details the debate regarding whether there was one pope with two names, or two distinct popes. Ancient sources are contradictory, and modern scholarship is divided.) bishop of Rome. Eusebius, in his book Church History mentioned Clement as the third bishop of Rome and as the "co-laborer" of Paul. In Against Heresies, Irenaeus described Clement as the successor to Anacletus, who was the third bishop of Rome, and as a personal acquaintance of the Apostles. According to the Annuario Pontificio, Clement was the fourth bishop of Rome, holding office at the very end of the 1st century. (Note: The 2008 Annuario pontificio gives the dates as either 92–99 or 68–76. However, the 2012 edition settles for 92 as the beginning date, following Eusebius and Jerome. The date of 68–76 is given by the later Catalogus Liberianus and Liber Pontificalis, which are not trustworthy for the chronology of the first popes. All four sources give Peter an episcopate of 25 years in Rome, and the Liber Pontificalis even records that Peter died 38 years after Jesus' death, that is, 67–68. However, the Catalogus and Liber counted Peter's episcopate from 30 and thus arrived to 55, as Pope Linus is said to have succeeded in 56. The author thus "gives two incompatible traditions." The year of Clement's death is disputed, it was 99 according to Jerome and 100 according to Eusebius (and the Liber Pontificalis, despite previously stating that his tenure ended in 76). All four sources give him a tenure of 9 years, which would place his death in 100/101.) It is likely that Clement died in exile, and was possibly martyred. According to apocryphal stories dating back to the 4th century by authors such as Rufinus, Clement was imprisoned by Roman Emperor Trajan, and was executed by being tied to an anchor and thrown into the sea. The Liber Pontificalis states that Clement died in Greece in the third year of Trajan's reign, or 100.

The only known genuine extant writing of Clement is his letter to the church at Corinth (1 Clement) in response to a dispute in which certain presbyters of the Corinthian church had been deposed. He asserted the authority of the presbyters as rulers of the church because they had been appointed by the Apostles. His letter, which is one of the oldest extant Christian documents outside the New Testament, was read in the church at Corinth, along with other epistles, some of which later became part of the Christian canon. This letter is considered to be the earliest affirmation of the principle of apostolic succession. A second epistle, 2 Clement, was once controversially attributed to Clement, although recent scholarship suggests it to be a homily by another author. In the pseudo-Clementine Writings, Clement is the intermediary through whom the apostles teach the church.

Clement is recognized as a saint in many Christian churches and a patron saint of mariners. He is commemorated on 23 November in the Catholic Church, the Anglican Communion, and the Lutheran Church. In Eastern Orthodox Christianity his feast is kept on 25 November.

== Life ==
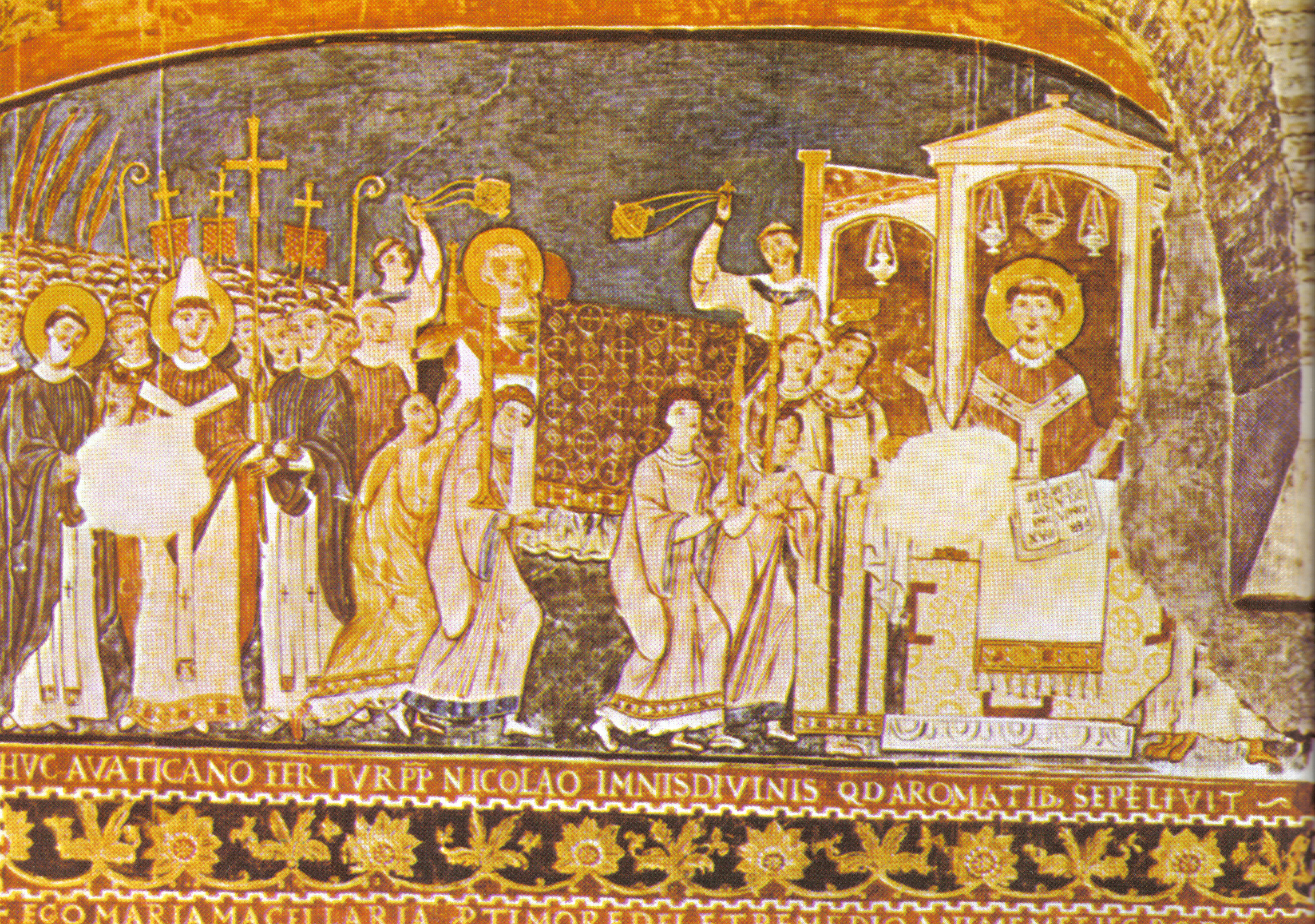
11th-century fresco in the Basilica of San Clemente, Rome: Saints Cyril and Methodius bring Saint Clement's relics to Rome

The Liber Pontificalis presents a list that makes Linus the second in the line of bishops of Rome, with Peter as first; but at the same time it states that Peter ordained two bishops, Linus and Anacletus, for the priestly service of the community, devoting himself instead to prayer and preaching, and that it was to Clement that he entrusted the Church as a whole, appointing him as his successor. Tertullian considered Clement to be the immediate successor of Peter. In one of his works, Jerome listed Clement as "the fourth bishop of Rome after Peter, if indeed the second was Linus and the third Anacletus, although most of the Latins think that Clement was second after the apostle." Clement is put after Linus and Cletus/Anacletus in the earliest (c. 180) account, that of Irenaeus, who is followed by Eusebius of Caesarea.

Early succession lists name Clement as the first, (Note: Like Schaff, the Holy See's Annuario Pontificio, gives Clement as "supreme pontiff of Rome" in either 92–99 or 68–76, making him either the first or the third successor of Saint Peter, but not the second.(Libreria Editrice Vaticana 2008, p. 7)) second, or third (Note: The Catholic Encyclopedia article says that only on the false assumption that "Cletus" and "Anacletus" were two distinct persons, instead of variations of the name of single individual, did some think that Clement was the fourth successor of Saint Peter.) successor of Peter. However, the meaning of his inclusion in these lists has been very controversial. Some believe there were presbyter-bishops as early as the 1st century, but that there is no evidence for a monarchical episcopacy in Rome at such an early date. There is also, however, no evidence of a change occurring in ecclesiastical organization in the latter half of the 2nd century, which would indicate that a new or newly-monarchical episcopacy was establishing itself.

The 2nd-century Shepherd of Hermas mentions a Clement whose office it was to communicate with other churches; most likely, this is a reference to Clement I. A tradition that began in the 3rd and 4th century, has identified him as the Clement that Paul mentioned in Philippians 4:3, a fellow laborer in Christ. (Note: Kelly & Walsh 2005, p. 7 note that "Writers of the 3rd and 4th centuries, like Origen, Eusebius, and Jerome, equate him (St. Clement I), perhaps, correctly, with the Clement whom St. Paul mentions (Phil 4:3) as a fellow worker.") While in the mid-19th century it was customary to identify him as a freedman of Titus Flavius Clemens, who was consul with his cousin, the Emperor Domitian, this identification, which no ancient sources suggest, afterwards lost support. Modern scholars, such as Ralph P. Martin, Gerald F. Hawthorne, and F. F. Bruce, say that the Clement mentioned in Philippians by Paul cannot be identified with anyone specific, other than saying he was a Philippian Christian.

A large congregation existed in Rome c. 58, when Paul wrote his Epistle to the Romans. Paul arrived in Rome c. 60 (Acts). Paul and Peter were said to have been martyred there. Nero persecuted Roman Christians after Rome burned in 64, and the congregation may have suffered further persecution under Domitian (81–96). Clement was the first of early Rome's most notable bishops. The Liber Pontificalis, which documents the reigns of popes, states that Clement had known Peter.

Clement is known for his epistle to the church in Corinth (c. 96), in which he asserts the apostolic authority of the bishops/presbyters as rulers of the church. The epistle mentions episkopoi (overseers, bishops) or presbyteroi (elders, presbyters) as the upper class of minister, served by the deacons, but, since it does not mention himself, it gives no indication of the title or titles used for Clement in Rome.

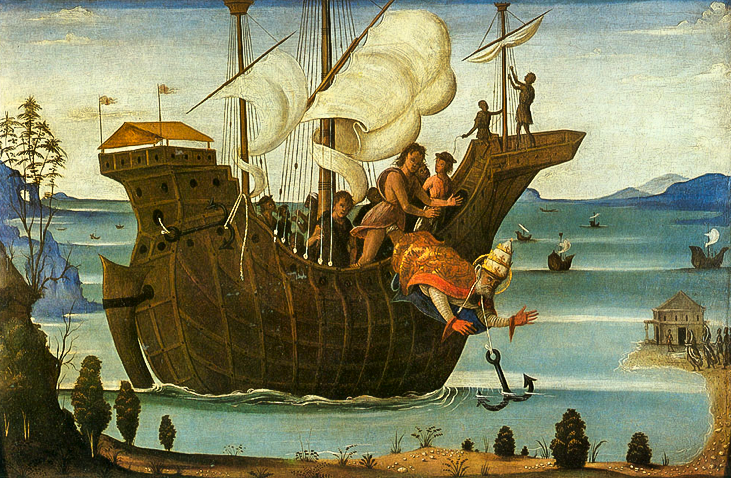
Martyrdom of St Clement by Fungai

== Death and legends of final days ==
According to apocryphal Acta dating to the 4th century at earliest, Clement was banished from Rome to the Chersonesus during the reign of the Emperor Trajan and was set to work in a stone quarry. Finding on his arrival that the prisoners were suffering from lack of water, he knelt down in prayer. Looking up, he saw a lamb on a hill, went to where the lamb had stood and struck the ground with his pickaxe, releasing a gushing stream of clear water. This miracle resulted in the conversion of large numbers of the local pagans and his fellow prisoners to Christianity. As punishment, Clement was martyred by being tied to an anchor and thrown from a boat into the Black Sea. The legend recounts that every year a miraculous ebbing of the sea revealed a divinely built shrine containing his bones. However, the oldest sources on Clement's life, Eusebius and Jerome, note nothing of his martyrdom.

The Inkerman Cave Monastery marks the supposed place of Clement's burial in Crimea. A year or two before his own death in 869, Cyril brought to Rome what he believed to be the relics of Clement, bones he found in Crimea buried with an anchor on dry land. They are now enshrined in the Basilica di San Clemente. But there are also other traditions about an ancient veneration of the relics in Chersonesus and the translation of the head to Kyiv. Other relics of Clement, including his head, are claimed by the Kyiv Monastery of the Caves in Ukraine.

== Writings ==
The Liber Pontificalis states that Clement wrote two letters (though the second letter, 2 Clement, is no longer ascribed to him by many modern scholars).

=== Epistle of Clement ===
Clement's only extant, uncontested text is a letter to the Christian congregation in Corinth, often called the First Epistle of Clement or 1 Clement. The history of 1 Clement clearly and continuously shows Clement as the author of this letter. It is considered the earliest authentic Christian document outside the New Testament.

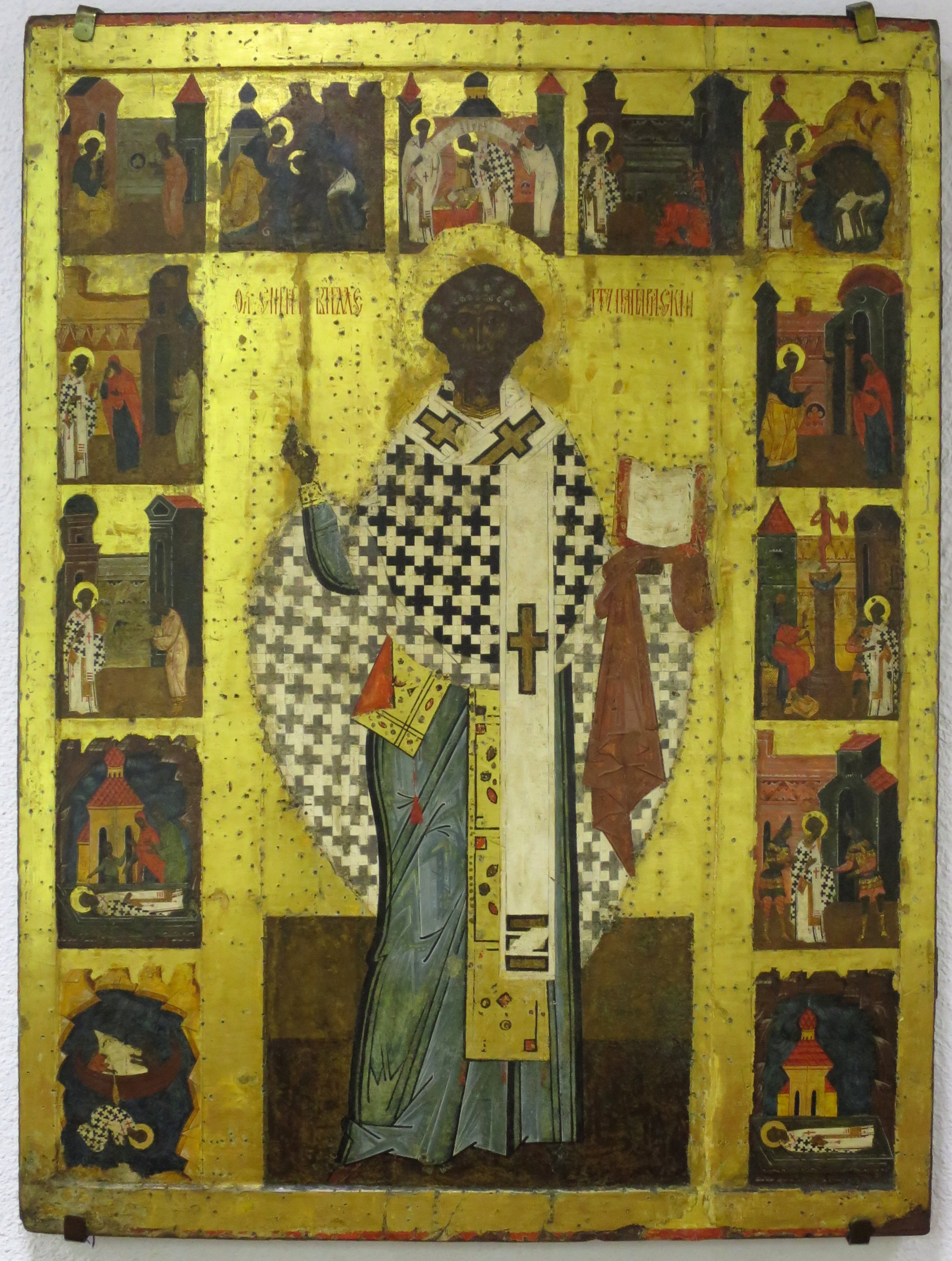
Russian icon of Saint Clement

Clement writes to the troubled congregation in Corinth, where certain "presbyters" or "bishops" have been deposed (the class of clergy above that of deacons is argued by certain historians to be designated indifferently by the two terms). Clement calls for repentance and reinstatement of those who have been deposed, in line with maintenance of order and obedience to church authority, since the apostles established the ministry of "bishops and deacons." He mentions "offering the gifts" as one of the functions of the higher class of clergy. The epistle offers valuable insight into Church ministry at that time and into the history of the Roman Church. It was highly regarded, and was read in church at Corinth along with the Scriptures c. 170.

We should be obedient unto God, rather than follow those who in arrogance and unruliness have set themselves up as leaders in abominable jealousy.... For Christ is with them that are lowly of mind, not with them that exalt themselves over the flock.

— Clement of Rome 1885b, 1 Clem 14:1; 16:1

Do we then think it to be a great and marvelous thing, if the Creator of the universe shall bring about the resurrection of them that have served Him with holiness in the assurance of a good faith, seeing that He showeth to us even by a bird the magnificence of His promise?

— Clement of Rome 1885b, 1 Clem 26:1

In the epistle, it is argued by some that Clement uses the terms "bishop" and "presbyter" interchangeably for the higher order of ministers above deacons. In some congregations, particularly in Egypt, the distinction between bishops and presbyters seems to have become established only later. But by the middle of the second century all the leading Christian centres had bishops. Scholars such as Bart Ehrman treat as significant the fact that, of the seven letters written by Ignatius of Antioch to seven Christian churches shortly after the time of Clement, the only one that does not present the church as headed by a single bishop is that addressed to the church in Rome, although this letter did not refer to a collective priesthood either.

Clement's letter also contains historical references, it mentions persecutions of Christians, records the martyrdom of the Apostle Peter and suggests that the apostle Paul traveled to Spain.

==== Theology ====
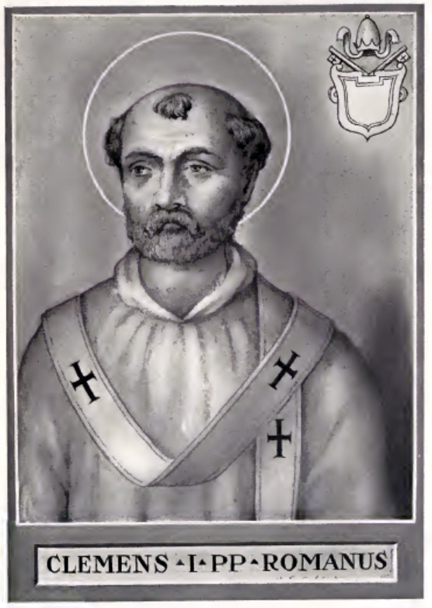
Clement of Rome

Clement's view on justification has had much scholarly discussion, as he is sometimes argued to have believed sola fide, though others believe him as having synergist views. Debate exists, because Clement directly stated that "we are not justified by ourselves but by faith", however in other places of the letter, he stresses judgement on sin. The Protestant scholar Tom Schreiner argued that Clement of Rome believed in a grace oriented justification by faith, which will cause the believer to do works as a result. Philip Schaff, however, held that the Protestant doctrine of justification by faith alone is not found in any of the church fathers, though he noted that perhaps Clement, unlike most early writers, kept Paul's doctrine of justification in view while joining it "with the doctrine of James". The Catholic Encyclopedia likewise wrote that Clement believed works to be part of justification. Rudolf Knopf and Rudolf Bultmann also believed that Clement believed in synergism, and that the believer needs to cooperate with the grace of God to be saved. Rudolf Knopf in his commentary on the letter of Clement to the Corinthians stated that: "Pre-Christian sins are wiped out by baptism. For those sins that follow, a person must have faith in divine mercy and, at the same time, that person must exhibit his or her own good deeds, apart from which the person cannot be saved." David Downs argued against the view that Clement of Rome holds synergist views; he argued that Clement did not write a letter about deep soteriology, but instead to provide moral guidance to the Corinthians, David Downs stated: "According to the soteriological economy of Clement everything rests on the goodness, mercy, and election of the Creator, which have befitted the 'chosen portion' through Jesus."

Fresco from Santa Maria Antiqua

Thomas Schreiner argued that Clement taught that faith was enough to be saved because of 1 Clement 32:4, where he stated:

And so we, having been called through His will in Christ Jesus, are not justified through ourselves or through our own wisdom or understanding or piety or works which we wrought in holiness of heart, but through faith, whereby the Almighty God justified all men that have been from the beginning; to whom be the glory for ever and ever. Amen.

— 1 Clement 32:4)

The epistle has been cited as the first work to establish Roman primacy, because he wrote to settle a problem in the church, but most scholars see the epistle as more fraternal than authoritative, (Note: Phan 2000, p. 32 writes, "Most scholars would now regard 1 Clement as an impressive example of fraternal correction rather than an authoritative intervention.") and Orthodox scholar John Meyendorff sees it as connected with the Roman church's awareness of its "priority" (rather than "primacy") among local churches. It has also been argued by Dave Armstrong, that Clement supported Papal infallibility in Letter to the Corinthians 1, 63. Because of him speaking of the Corinthians to "being obedient" to the things he has "written through the Holy Spirit" in order to correct and "root out the wicked passion of jealousy".

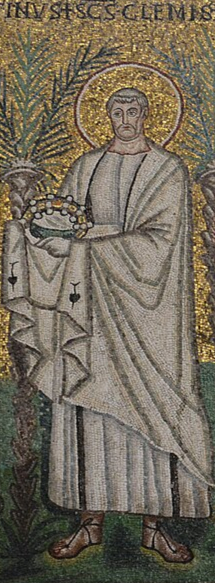
Mosaic of Saint Clement of Rome from the Basilica of Sant'Apollinare Nuovo in Ravenna

It has also been argued that the epistle may contain early evidence for belief in universal salvation.

According to the Catholic Encyclopedia, the letter of Clement has Trinitarian theology and Christ is frequently called the high priest by him.

=== Writings formerly attributed to Clement ===
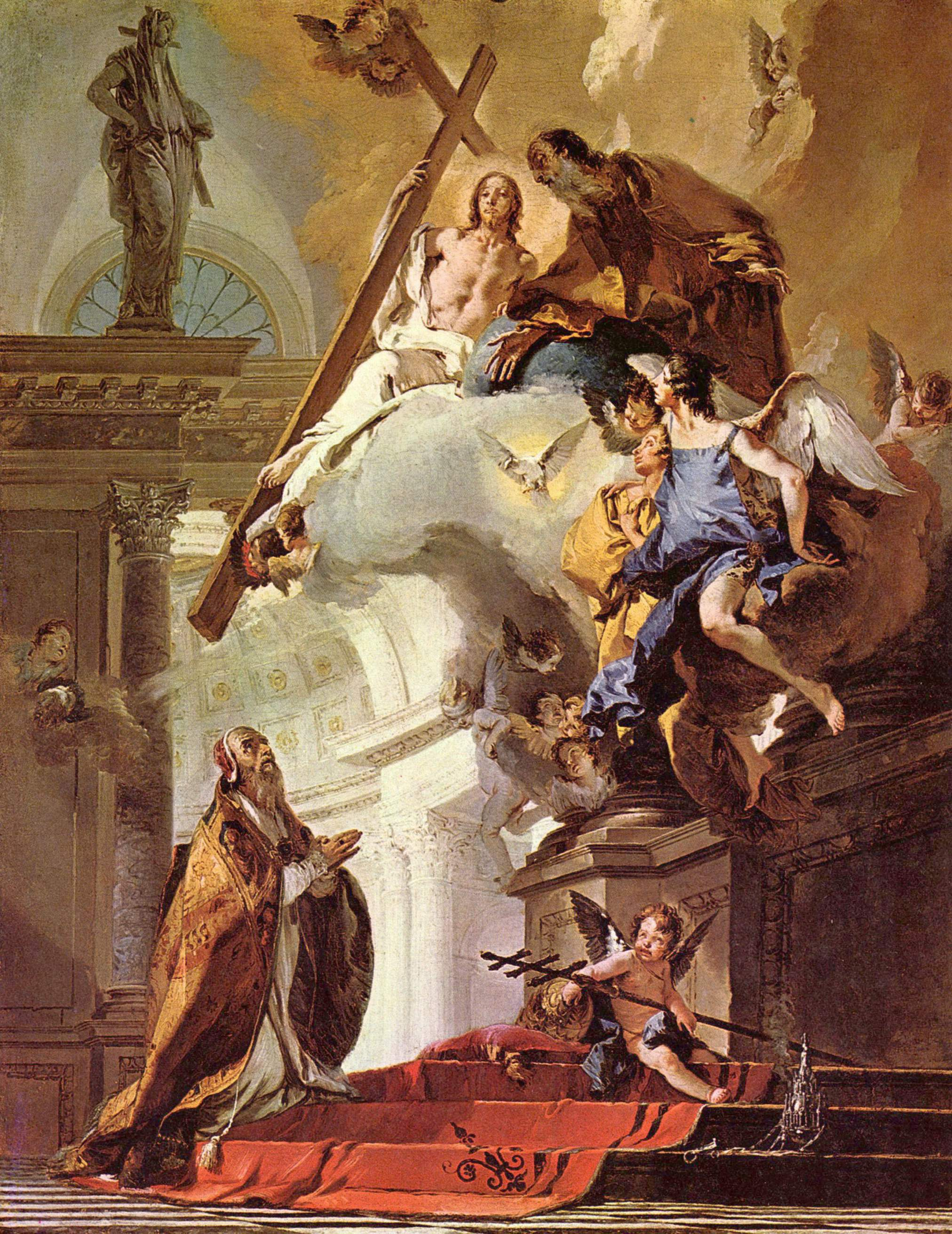
Saint Clement, by Tiepolo

==== Second Epistle of Clement ====
The Second Epistle of Clement is a homily, or sermon, likely written in Corinth or Rome, although it is doubtful it was written by Clement. Early Christian congregations often shared homilies to be read. The homily describes Christian character and repentance. It is possible that the Church from which Clement sent his epistle had included a festal homily to share in one economical post, thus the homily became known as the Second Epistle of Clement.

While 2 Clement has been traditionally ascribed to Clement, most scholars believe that 2 Clement was written in the 2nd century based on the doctrinal themes of the text and a near match between words in 2 Clement and in the Greek Gospel of the Egyptians. Doubts about the authorship were already expressed in antiquity by Eusebius and Jerome.

==== Epistles on Virginity ====
Two "Epistles on Virginity" were traditionally attributed to Clement, but now there exists almost universal consensus that Clement was not the author of those two epistles.

==== False Decretals ====
A 9th-century collection of church legislation known as the False Decretals, which was once attributed to Isidore of Seville, is largely composed of forgeries. All of what it presents as letters of pre-Nicene popes, beginning with Clement, are forgeries, as are some of the documents that it attributes to councils; (Note: The Encyclopædia Britannica places the Donation of Constantine in this section; the Oxford Dictionary of the Christian Church places it in the section of the pre-Nicene Popes.) and more than forty falsifications are found in the decretals that it gives as those of post-Nicene popes from Sylvester I (314–335) to Gregory II (715–731). The False Decretals were part of a series of falsifications of past legislation by a party in the Carolingian Empire whose principal aim was to free the church and the bishops from interference by the state and the metropolitan archbishops respectively.

Clement is included among other early Christian popes as authors of the Pseudo-Isidoran (or False) Decretals, a 9th-century forgery. These decrees and letters portray even the early popes as claiming absolute and universal authority. (Note: Durant 2011, p. 525 writes, "These early documents were designed to show that by the oldest traditions and practice of the Church no bishop might be deposed, no Church councils might be convened, and no major issue might be decided, without the consent of the pope. Even the early pontiffs, by these evidences, had claimed absolute and universal authority as vicars of Christ on Earth.") Clement is the earliest pope to whom a Pseudo-Isidoran text is attributed.

=== Clementine literature ===
Clement is also the hero of an early Christian romance or novel that has survived in at least two different versions, known as the Clementine literature, where he is identified with Emperor Domitian's cousin Titus Flavius Clemens. Clementine literature portrays Clement as the Apostles' means of disseminating their teachings to the Church.

== Sainthood ==
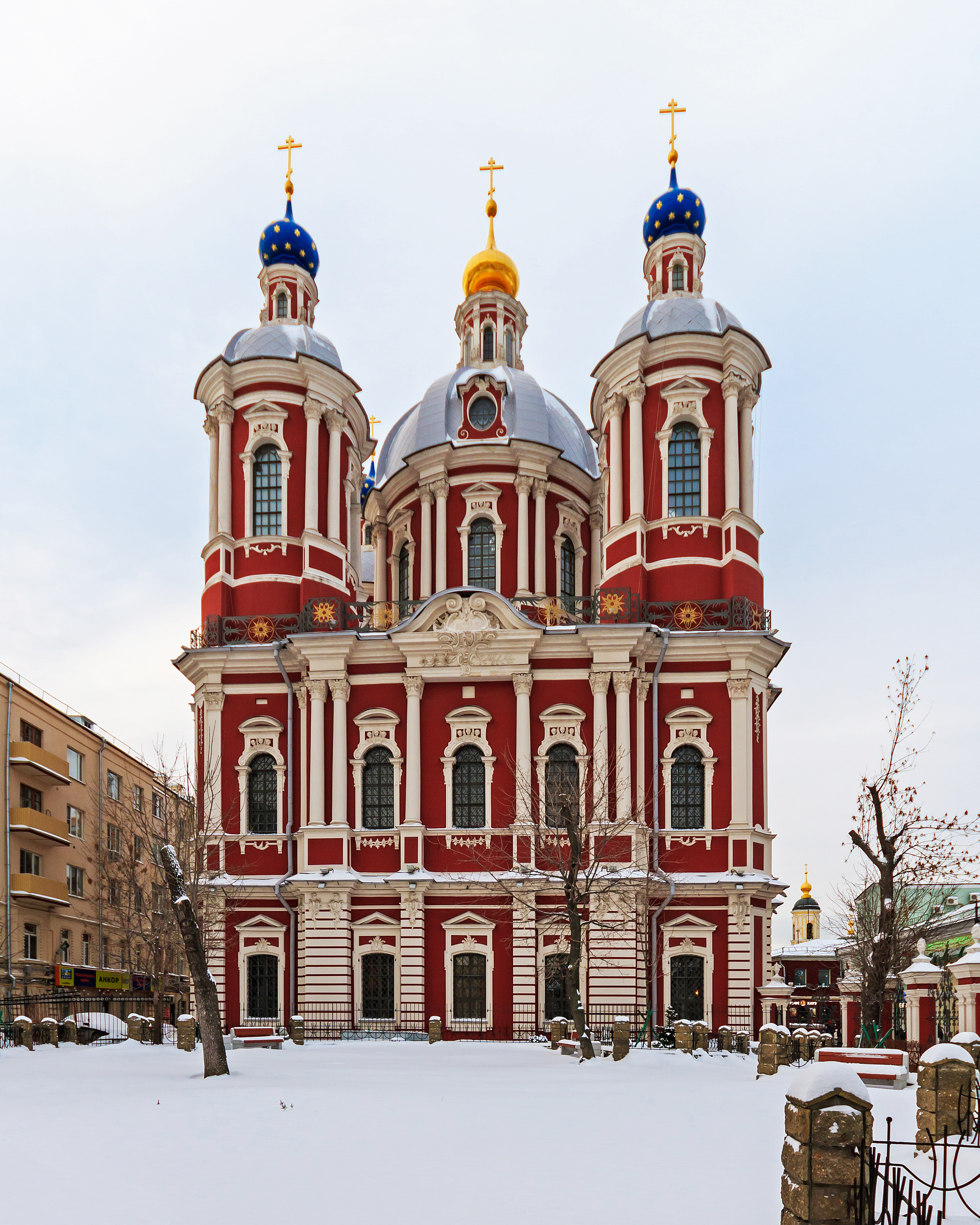
St. Clement is one of the few Roman popes to have a Russian Orthodox church dedicated in his name.

Clement's name is in the Roman Canon of the Mass. He is commemorated on 23 November as a pope and martyr in the Catholic Church as well as within the Anglican Communion and the Lutheran Church. The Syriac Orthodox Church, the Malankara Orthodox Syrian Church, the Macedonian Orthodox Church and the Greek Orthodox Church, as well as the Syriac Catholic Church, the Syro-Malankara Catholic Church and all Byzantine Rite Eastern Catholic Churches commemorate Clement of Rome (called in Syriac "Mor Clemis") on 24 November; the Russian Orthodox Church commemorates Clement on 25 November. Clement is honored in the Church of England and in the Episcopal Church on 23 November.

The St Clement's Church in Moscow is renowned for its glittering Baroque interior and iconostasis, as well as a set of gilded 18th-century railings. The parish was disbanded in 1934 and the original free-standing gate was demolished. The Lenin State Library stored its books in the building throughout the Soviet period. It was not until 2008 that the building reverted to the Russian Orthodox Church.

Clement of Rome is commemorated in the Synaxarium of the Coptic Orthodox Church of Alexandria on the 29th of the month of Hatour [25 November (Julian) – equivalent to 8 December (Gregorian) due to the current 13-day Julian–Gregorian Calendar offset]. According to the Coptic Church Synaxarium, he suffered martyrdom in 100 during the reign of Emperor Trajan (98–117). He was martyred by tying his neck to an anchor and casting him into the sea. The record of the 29th of the Coptic month of Hatour states that this saint was born in Rome to an honorable father whose name was Fostinus and also states that he was a member of the Roman senate and that his father educated him and taught him Greek literature.

=== Relics ===
Besides relics venerated in Rome and Kyiv (see above), in the city of Santa Cruz de Tenerife in Spain, the shinbone of Clement is kept. It was a gift of Sidotti, Patriarch of Antioch, to the Church of the Immaculate Conception. Historically, this was a highly revered relic in the city.

=== Symbolism ===
Anchored Cross, also known as Mariner's or Saint Clement's cross.

In workings of art, Clement can be recognized by having an anchor at his side or tied to his neck. He is most often depicted wearing papal vestments, including the pallium, and sometimes with a papal tiara but more often with a mitre. He is also sometimes shown with papal symbols such as the papal cross and the Keys of Heaven. In reference to his martyrdom, he often holds the palm of martyrdom.

Clement can be seen depicted near a fountain or spring, relating to the incident from his hagiography, or lying in a temple in the sea. The Anchored Cross or Mariner's Cross is also referred to as St. Clement's Cross, in reference to the way he was martyred.

== See also ==
- List of popes
- List of Catholic saints
- Pope Saint Clement I, patron saint archive
- St Clement's Day
- Saint Clement and Sisinnius inscription – 11th-century Romance and Latin inscription

Catholic Church titles
Preceded by Anacletus	Bishop of Rome; 92–100	Succeeded by Evaristus
