= Muratorian fragment =

Ancient list of books of the New Testament

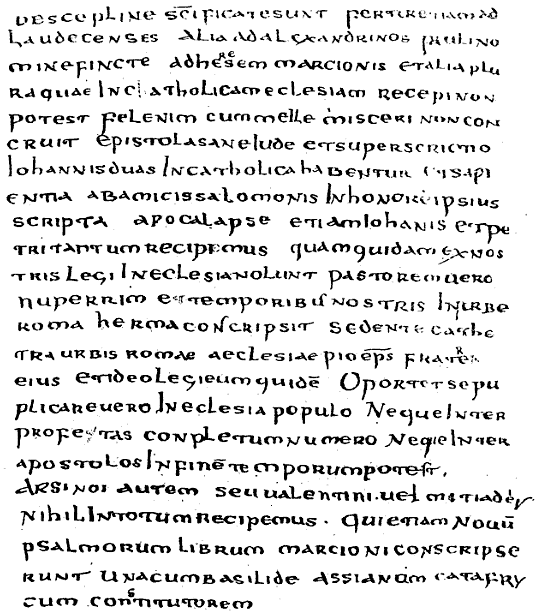
Last page of the Canon Muratori, as published by Tregelles in 1868

The Muratorian fragment, also known as the Muratorian Canon (Latin: Canon Muratori), is a copy of perhaps the oldest known list of most of the books of the New Testament. The fragment, consisting of 85 lines, is a Latin manuscript bound in a roughly 8th-century codex from the library of Columbanus's monastery at Bobbio Abbey; it contains features suggesting it is a translation from a Greek original written in the late 2nd century (c. 170–200). Other scholars suggest it might have been originally written as late as the 4th century, although this is not the consensus opinion. Both the degraded condition of the manuscript and the poor Latin in which it was written have made it difficult to translate. The beginning of the fragment is missing, and it ends abruptly. The fragment consists of all that remains of a section of a list of all the works that were accepted as canonical by the churches known to its original compiler.

During the time period of early Christianity, there was no accepted "New Testament", merely books considered of greater or lesser value. While likely not intended strictly as a canon list, the fragment is evidence of the first attempts to systemize such a group of approved writings, at least if it indeed dates to the 2nd century. Debates on what works should be accepted as scripture would continue. The earliest version of the eventual consensus New Testament canon did not occur until 367, when bishop Athanasius of Alexandria in his annual Easter letter composed a list that is still recognized today as the canon of 27 books. However, it would take several more centuries of debate until agreement on Athanasius' canon was reached within all of Christendom.

== Manuscript history ==
The Muratorian fragment was discovered in the Ambrosian Library in Milan by Father Ludovico Antonio Muratori (1672–1750), the most famous Italian historian of his generation. Realizing its significance and antiquity, he published it in 1740. The manuscript was likely copied sometime during or near the 8th century at Bobbio Abbey. A few lines of the Muratorian fragment were later found preserved in some codices of Paul's Epistles at the Benedictine abbey of Monte Cassino. These documents date from the 11th and 12th centuries, and the copied lines largely concur with the Bobbio version with minor variations.

== Authorship and date ==
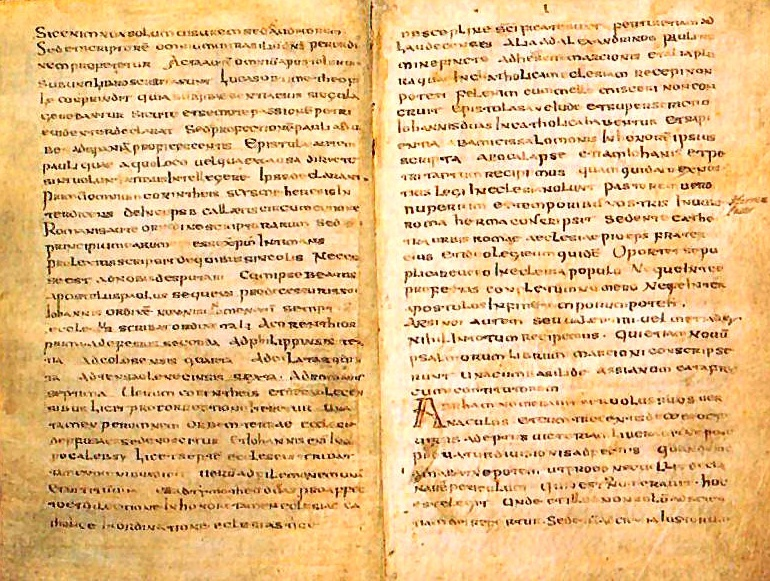
Muratorian fragment preserved in Milan, Bibliotheca Ambrosiana, Cod. J 101 sup.

The original author of the fragment is unknown. The text of the list itself is traditionally dated to the second half of the second century because the author refers to Pius I, bishop of Rome (140—155), as recent:

But Hermas wrote The Shepherd "most recently in our time", in the city of Rome, while bishop Pius, his brother, was occupying the chair of the church of the city of Rome. And therefore it ought indeed to be read; but it cannot be read publicly to the people in church either among the Prophets, whose number is complete, or among the Apostles, for it is after their time.

Another reason suggesting a date toward the end of the second century is the concern with denouncing Marcion, a Christian bishop whose influence was the strongest in the second century, as well as Gnostics, who were also more prominent in the 2nd century than at later dates.

The document contains a list of books the Roman church of his era considered authoritative — a predecessor to what would become the New Testament. A similar list concerning the Old Testament likely preceded it, but if such a section was written, it was not preserved in the fragment. The fragment is in barbarous Latin which has probably been translated from an original in Greek, the language prevailing in the second century Christian community of Rome. Bruce Metzger has advocated the traditional dating, as has Charles E. Hill. A reason to suspect an origin in the Western church, other than the obvious of the manuscript being found in Italy, is the absence of the Epistle to the Hebrews in the list, which appears to have been more widely accepted in the Greek-speaking east of the Roman Empire than in the Western, Roman church.

Other scholars disagree with this dating, however. Albert Sundburg proposed a rival interpretation in 1973: that the fragment did not originate from Roman Christians, but rather the Greek-speaking east of the empire, and is dated to the fourth century due to its mention of the Apocalypse of Peter. In this interpretation, the reference to the Shepherd of Hermas merely meant "recently" in a broader sense of "not stretching all the way back to the 1st century", in this view. Another option propounded by Clare Rothschild is that the fragment was written in Latin originally in the 4th century, possibly even later, and the reason for the awful Latin style was not poor translation but rather the copyist being unfamiliar with the abbreviation style used in the older manuscript. Rothschild also sees the fragment as a forgery attempting to portray itself as being written in the 2nd century, to explain the reference to the Shepherd and Pius. As an example, most scholars do not believe the Gelasian Decree to have been written by Pope Gelasius or even during his reign; similarly, it is possible that the writer was merely backdating their work by saying Pius was recent.

The theories for a later composition date have in general not prevailed over the existing scholarly consensus suggesting a second century date as the most likely. The Rothschild theory in particular has been criticized by scholar Christophe Guignard on many aspects.

== Contents ==
=== Acceptance of the Gospels of Luke and John ===
The unidentified author accepts four Gospels, the last two of which are Luke and John, but the names of the first two at the beginning of the list are missing. Scholars find it highly likely that the missing two gospels are Matthew and Mark, although this remains uncertain. Also accepted by the author are the "Acts of all Apostles" and 13 of the Pauline Epistles (the Epistle to the Hebrews is not mentioned in the fragment). The author considers spurious the letters claiming to have Paul as author that are ostensibly addressed to the Laodiceans and to the Alexandrians. Of these he says they are "forged in Paul's name to [further] the heresy of Marcion."

=== Epistles ===
Of the General epistles, the author accepts the Epistle of Jude and says that two epistles "bearing the name of John are counted in the catholic church". 1 Peter, 2 Peter, and James are not mentioned in the fragment. It is clear that the author assumed that the author of the Gospel of John was the same as the author of the First Epistle of John, for in the middle of discussing the Gospel of John he says "what marvel then is it that John brings forward these several things so constantly in his epistles also, saying in his own person, "What we have seen with our eyes and heard with our ears, and our hands have handled that have we written," (1 John 1:1) which is a quotation from the First Epistle of John. It is not clear whether the other epistle in question is 2 John or 3 John. Another indication that the author identified the Gospel writer John with two epistles bearing John's name is that when he specifically addresses the epistles of John, he writes, "the Epistle of Jude indeed, and the two belonging to the above mentioned John." In other words, he thinks that these letters were written by the John whom he has already discussed, namely John the gospel writer. He gives no indication that he considers the John of the Apocalypse to be a different John from the author of the Gospel of John. The author also includes the Book of Wisdom, "written by the friends of Solomon in his honor" [line 70] in the canon, and places the reference next to the epistles.

=== Apocalypses of John and Peter ===
The fragment mentions two approved works of apocalyptic literature: the Apocalypse of John and the Apocalypse of Peter. The Apocalypse of John would go on to be better known as "Revelation" in the modern New Testament, while the Apocalypse of Peter would eventually fall out of favor in the 4th and 5th centuries. The author seems to think that the author of the Apocalypse of John (see debate on the authorship of Revelation) was a "predecessor" of Paul and wrote his epistles to the 7 churches first, although this dating does not match later scholarship, which believes Paul's epistles predate the Apocalypse. The author also remarks that "some of us will not allow [the Apocalypse of Peter] to be read in church". This hesitation with the Apocalypse of Peter would manifest in later centuries with it not being included in later canons. As the manuscript legacy for the Apocalypse of Peter is more sparse than books that made it into the New Testament, it is difficult to know how closely the Apocalypse of Peter read by the author of the fragment matches the few surviving manuscripts of it.

== Canon list ==
Book	Muratorian Canon	Present canon (Note: The Assyrian Church of the East does not recognise the following books: 2 Peter, 2 and 3 John, Epistle of Jude, Apocalypse of John. It also rejects certain verses of books as non-canonical: Matthew 27:35(b), Luke 22:17-18, John 7:53, 8:1-11, Acts 8:37, 15:34 and 28:29, and 1 John 5:7.)
Gospel of Matthew	Probably (Note: The beginning of the Muratorian Canon is lost; the fragment that has survived, starts by listing "the third book of the Gospel, that according to Luke, […] the fourth Gospel is that of John, one of the disciples". Historians therefore assume that the first two gospels would have been Matthew and Mark, although this remains uncertain.)	Yes
Gospel of Mark	Probably	Yes
Gospel of Luke	Yes	Yes
Gospel of John	Yes	Yes
Acts of the Apostles	Yes	Yes
Romans	Yes	Yes
1 Corinthians	Yes	Yes
2 Corinthians	Yes	Yes
Galatians	Yes	Yes
Ephesians	Yes	Yes
Philippians	Yes	Yes
Colossians	Yes	Yes
1 Thessalonians	Yes	Yes
2 Thessalonians	Yes	Yes
1 Timothy	Yes	Yes
2 Timothy	Yes	Yes
Titus	Yes	Yes
Philemon	Yes	Yes
Hebrews	No	Yes (Note: Martin Luther doubted the canonicity of Hebrews, James, Jude and the Apocalypse of John. He showed this by the way in which he ordered them. However, he did incorporate the books in his canon, and all Lutheran communities have done so since.)
James	No	Yes
1 Peter	No	Yes
2 Peter	No	Yes
1 John	Probably (Note: The Muratorian fragment mentions two letters by John, but gives little clues as to which ones. Therefore, it is not known which of the three was excluded that would later be considered canonical. Bruce Metzger thought that the Muratorian fragment cites 1 John 1:1-3 when it says: "What marvel is it then, if John so consistently mentions these particular points also in his Epistles, saying about himself, 'What we have seen with our eyes and heard with our ears and our hands have handled, these things we have written to you?'".)	Yes
2 John	Maybe	Yes
3 John	Maybe	Yes
Jude	Yes	Yes
Apocalypse of John	Yes	Yes
Apocalypse of Peter	Yes (Note: With some reservation however: "though some amongst us will not have [the Apocalypse of Peter] read in the Church.")	No
Wisdom of Solomon	Yes	Varies by denomination (Note: The Wisdom of Solomon is accepted as a canonical part of the Old Testament by Roman Catholic, Eastern Orthodox, and Oriental Orthodox churches and also by the Assyrian Church of the East. Most Protestants consider it apocryphal.)

=== Rejected works ===
Book	Muratorian Canon	Comments
Shepherd of Hermas	Recommended	The author admires it and suggests it should be read, but does not consider it a work of scripture as it was "recently written," and the author considered only works from prophets or apostles to be worthy of canonicity.
Epistle to the Laodiceans	No	Called a forgery of Marcion of Sinope and his followers. A lost work.
Epistle to the Alexandrians	No	Called a forgery of Marcion of Sinope and his followers. A lost work.
Works of Arsinous, Valentinus, Miltiades, and Basilides	No	Many of these were figures in Gnosticism, a major sect of Christianity in the second century. The manuscript becomes impossible to read afterward, providing no explanation for why they were condemned.
