= Liberian Catalogue =

4th-century list of Christian popes

The Liberian Catalogue (Latin: Catalogus Liberianus) is a list of the bishops of Rome from Peter to Liberius (died 366). For each bishop, the list gives the lengths of his episcopate, the corresponding consular dates and the names of the reigning emperors. In many cases there are other details. The catalogue is found in copies of the Chronography of 354, a "collection of tracts .. edited (apparently by one Furius Dionysius Philocalus) in 354".

The Liberian Catalogue is clearly the work of a compiler using earlier texts. It has been suggested that it is largely dependent on a work of Bishop Hippolytus of Rome (died 235), and is his lost Chronica. The character of the entries changes after Pontian. There are a number of "strange errors" (Edmundson 1913, lecture VIII) in the Liberian Catalogue, some of which may be the product merely of copyist errors. The texts in the Chronography do display damage in transmission.

== Anomalies in the Liberian Catalogue ==
George Edmundson pointed out a number of anomalies. "The deaths of St. Peter and St. Paul are stated to have taken place in A.D. 55 Clement succeeds Linus in A.D. 67, and Anencletus, the real successor of Linus, is duplicated and follows Clement, first as Cletus, then as Anacletus. Clement’s death is recorded as having occurred sixteen years before he became bishop according to the generally received date." Nor were the errors confined to the first-century episcopates. The Hippolytean source is not even accurate about Pope Pius himself, who in the words of the Muratorian fragment lived "very recently in our own times". Hegesippus and Irenaeus, both of whom stayed some time in Rome soon after the death of Pius, both give the order of succession as Pius, Anicetus, Soter, Eleutherus. The Liberian Catalogue makes Pius the successor of Anicetus instead of the predecessor.

== Depositio martyrum and the Depositio episcoporum ==
Two other lists are associated, in the sense that they occur in the same manuscript (the Chronographus anni 354). These are the Depositio martyrum and Depositio episcoporum. While these names could be generic, for lists of martyrs and bishops, scholarly usage without qualification tends to mean these lists.

== See also ==
- List of lists of ancient kings
- List of popes
