= Acts 11 =

- ← chapter 10 chapter 12 →
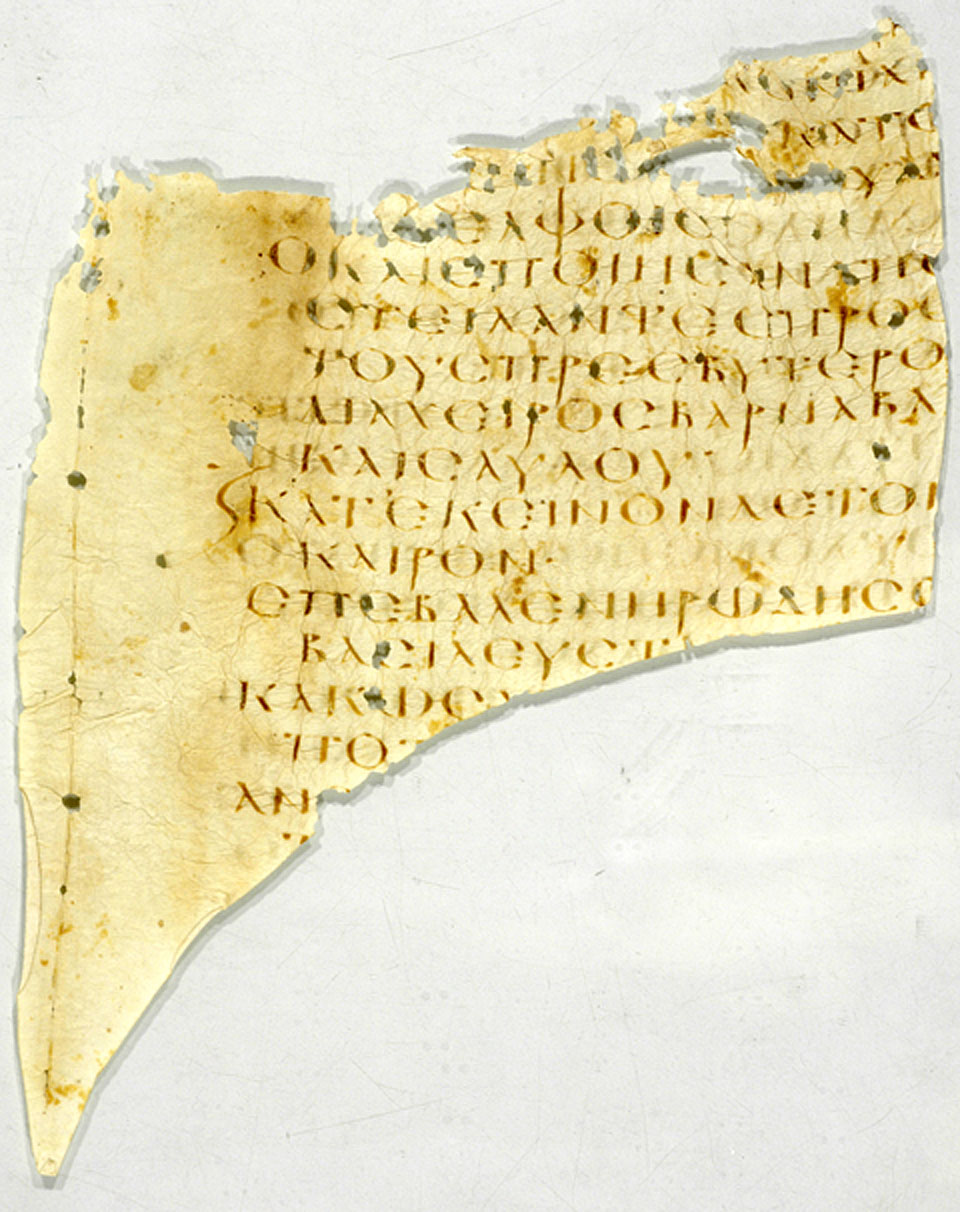
- Acts 11:29–12:2 on the recto side of Uncial 0244 (Gregory-Aland) from the 5th century.
- Book: Acts of the Apostles
- Category: Church history
- Christian Bible part: New Testament
- Order in the Christian part: 5

Acts 11 is the eleventh chapter of the Acts of the Apostles in the New Testament of the Christian Bible. It records that Saint Peter defends his visit to Cornelius in Caesarea and retells his vision prior to the meeting as well as the pouring of Holy Spirit during the meeting. Early Christian tradition uniformly affirmed that Luke composed this book as well as the Gospel of Luke. Critical opinion on the tradition was evenly divided at the end of the 20th century.

== Text ==
The original text was written in Koine Greek. This chapter is divided into 30 verses.

=== Textual witnesses ===
Some early manuscripts containing the text of this chapter are:

In Greek

- Codex Vaticanus (AD 325–350)
- Codex Sinaiticus (330–360)
- Codex Bezae (~400)
- Codex Alexandrinus (400–440)
- Papyrus 127 (5th century; extant verses 2–5, 30)
- Codex Laudianus (~550)

In Latin

- León palimpsest (7th century; extant verses 1–13)

=== New Testament references ===
- Acts 11:15: Acts 1:4
- Acts 11:16: John 1:26
- Acts 11:19: Acts 8:1

== Locations ==
Places mentioned in (blue) and related to (black) this chapter.

This chapter mentions the following places:

- Antioch
- Caesarea
- Joppa
- Jerusalem
- Judea
- Tarsus

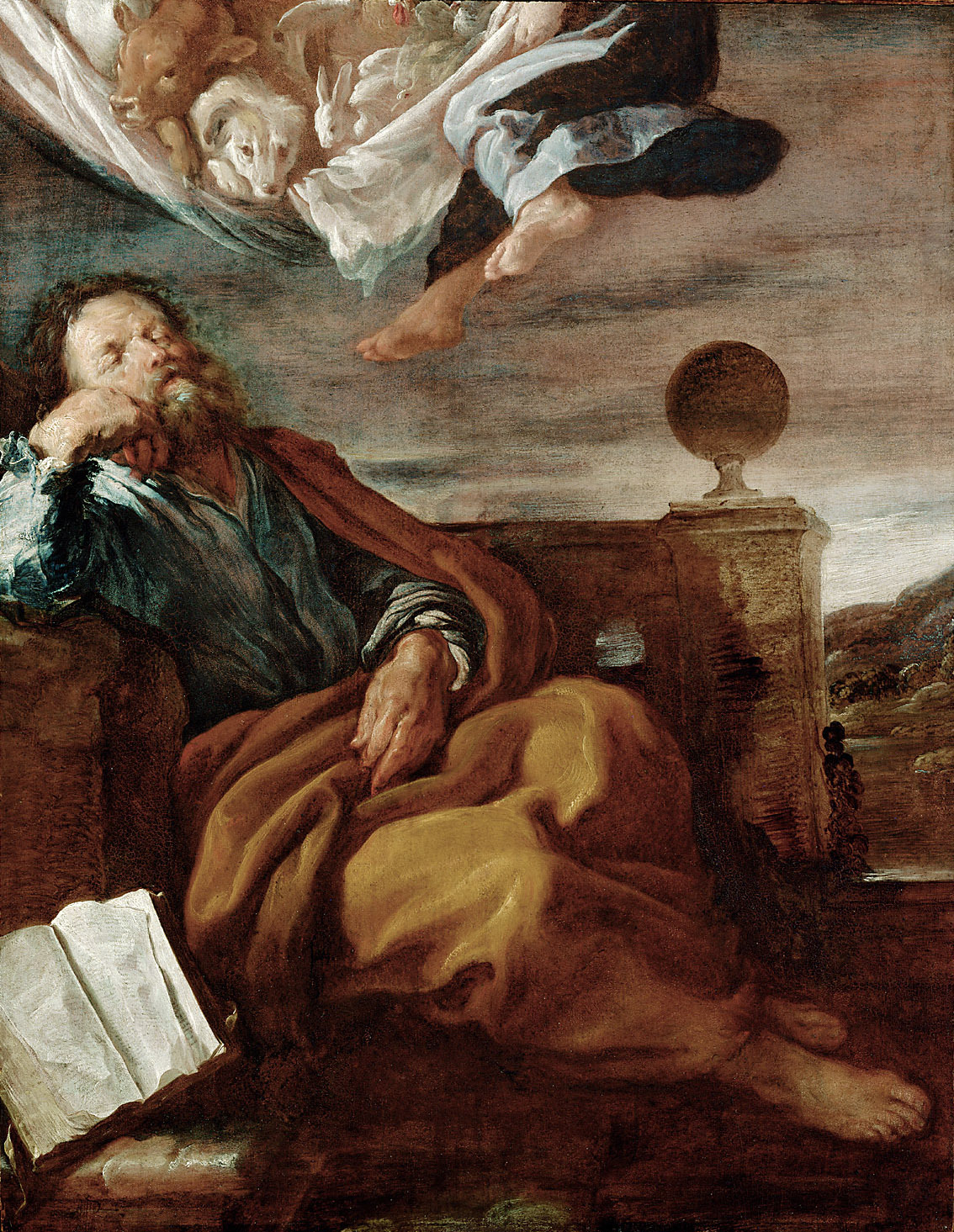
The vision of Peter, painted by Domenico Fetti.

== Ratification in Jerusalem (verses 1–18) ==
Some church members, identified as 'circumcised believers' (Acts 11:2), objected to the reception of Gentiles into the church, using precisely the kind of 'discrimination' that Peter was warned against in Acts 10:20 (cf. Acts 11:12), on the issue of the 'traditional restrictions on table-fellowship between Jews and Gentiles' (as Peter himself referred in Acts 10:28), that was significant in the early church as written by Paul in Galatians 2:11–14. Peter emphasizes 'the role of the Spirit, the importance of not 'making a distinction' (verse 12), and the parallel with Pentecost (verse 15)' in relation to Jesus' words (verse 16; cf. Acts 1:5). He warns that 'withholding baptism from the Gentiles would be tantamount to hindering God' (verse 17), because each step in the development of the church is initiated by God.

=== Verse 12 ===
The Spirit told me to have no hesitation about going with them. These six brothers also went with me, and we entered the man's house.

These six fellow believers are not identified, but John Gill suggests it was "a very wise and prudential step" on Peter's part to take them with him from Joppa to Caesarea and from there to Jerusalem, anticipating that once in Jerusalem he might "be called to an account for his conduct".

=== Verse 17 ===
[Simon Peter said to the assembly:] “If therefore God gave them the same gift as He gave us when we believed on the Lord Jesus Christ, who was I that I could withstand God?”

The words "them" and "us" emphasize the parallel of the two cases (cf. Acts 11:15), for just as faith existed before the gift of the Spirit in the case of Peter and the Apostles, so in the case of Cornelius and his companions there should exist a degree of faith, otherwise the gift was not manifested in them.

=== Verse 18 ===
When they heard these things they became silent; and they glorified God, saying, "Then God has also granted to the Gentiles repentance to life."

This concludes the "unified and tightly constructed episode of Cornelius' conversion".

== The church in Antioch (verses 19–26) ==
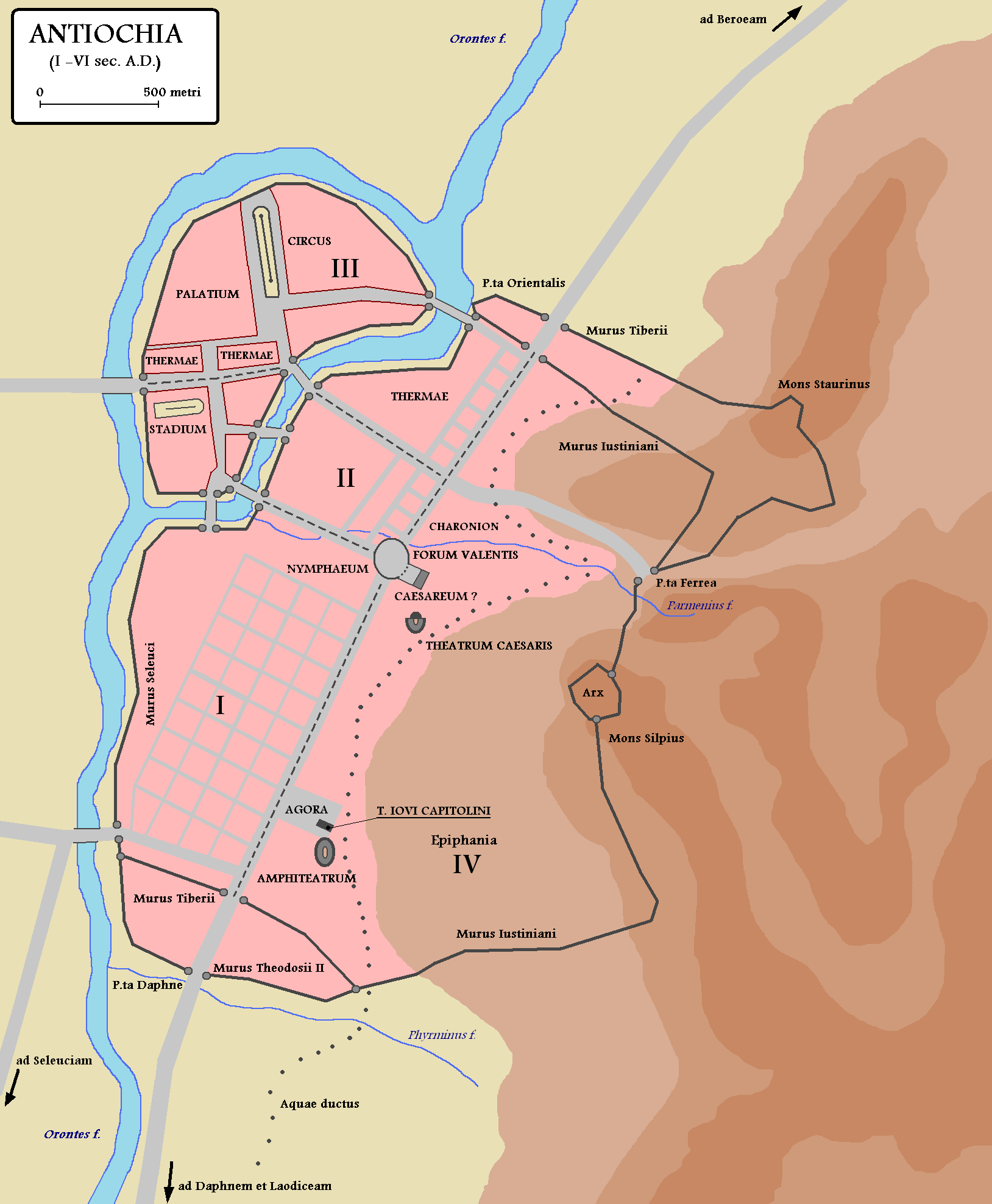
Map of Antiochia (Antioch) in Roman and early Byzantine times

This section extends Acts 8:1 ("those who were scattered", following Stephen's death), as the traveling disciples "[speak] the word" or "preach the word" (verse 19; cf. Acts 8:4) to the Jewish population over a wide region (Phoenicia, Cyprus). It then focuses on the development of the early church in Antioch in Syria (c. 300 miles (480 km) north of Jerusalem).

The reference to "the persecution that followed Stephen's death", picks up the Greek wording ἐπὶ Στεφάνῳ (epi Stephanō), which has been interpreted as meaning either "after" or "on account of" the stoning of Stephen.

In Antioch, some of the believers started preaching also to "Greeks" (verse 20; Greek: Ἑλληνιστάς, Hellēnistas, "Hellenists"; some manuscripts, such as Papyrus 74, have Ἑλληνάς, Hellēnas, "Grecians"), a development from the earlier Cornelius episode. The apostles reacted to the news (verse 22) similar to that in Acts 8:14, but this time they first sent Barnabas (introduced in Acts 4:36) who plays important roles as the liaison to the church in Jerusalem and as the one who brings Saul (or Paul) from Tarsus (verses 25–26) to spend a year quietly engaged in 'teaching'.

=== Verse 26 ===
And when he (Barnabas) had found him (Saul or Paul of Tarsus), he brought him to Antioch. So it was that for a whole year they assembled with the church and taught a great many people.

And the disciples were first called Christians in Antioch.

- "Christians": This is the first mention of the term "Christian" in the New Testament. It is followed by a second mention by Herod Agrippa II (Acts 26:28) and by Simon Peter in his first epistle (1 Peter 4:16). All three occasions are considered to reflect a derisive element referring to the followers of Christ who did not acknowledge the emperor of Rome.

== Famine relief measures (verses 27–30) ==
The sending of help for the famine in Judea (during the reign of Claudius, 41-54 CE) raises up some historical difficulties:

1. The placement of the narrative before the death of Herod Agrippa I (44 CE; cf. Acts 12:20–24), seems to be in conflict with the date 46—48 CE given by Josephus (Ant. 20.101). However, Acts also records the return of the relief party to Antioch after Herod's death (Acts 12:25).
2. It appears to contradict Paul's claim that he visited Jerusalem only once before he attended the council there (Galatians 2:1-10; Acts 15). If Paul's first visit was the one recorded in Acts 9, then Paul would have made an extra visit to Jerusalem against his statement in Galatians 1:17–24, or it is possible the epistle to the Galatians was written before the council in Jerusalem (which clarifies why Paul does not mention it) and this visit is the "private" one mentioned in the epistle

== See also ==
- Antioch
- Barnabas
- Caesarea Maritima
- Claudius Caesar
- Cornelius the Centurion
- Joppa
- Jerusalem
- Peter's vision of a sheet with animals
- Simon Peter
- Tarsus
- Acts 9, Acts 10, and Acts 15

== Sources ==
- Alexander, Loveday (2007). "62. Acts". In Barton, John; Muddiman, John (eds.). The Oxford Bible Commentary (first (paperback) ed.). Oxford University Press. pp. 1028–1061. ISBN 978-0199277186.
- Coogan, Michael David (2007). Coogan, Michael David; Brettler, Marc Zvi; Newsom, Carol Ann; Perkins, Pheme (eds.). The New Oxford Annotated Bible with the Apocryphal/Deuterocanonical Books: New Revised Standard Version, Issue 48 (Augmented 3rd ed.). Oxford University Press. ISBN 9780195288810.
- Wuest, Kenneth Samuel (1973). Wuest's word studies from the Greek New Testament. Vol. 1. ISBN 978-0-8028-2280-2.
