= Acts 10 =

- ← chapter 9 chapter 11 →
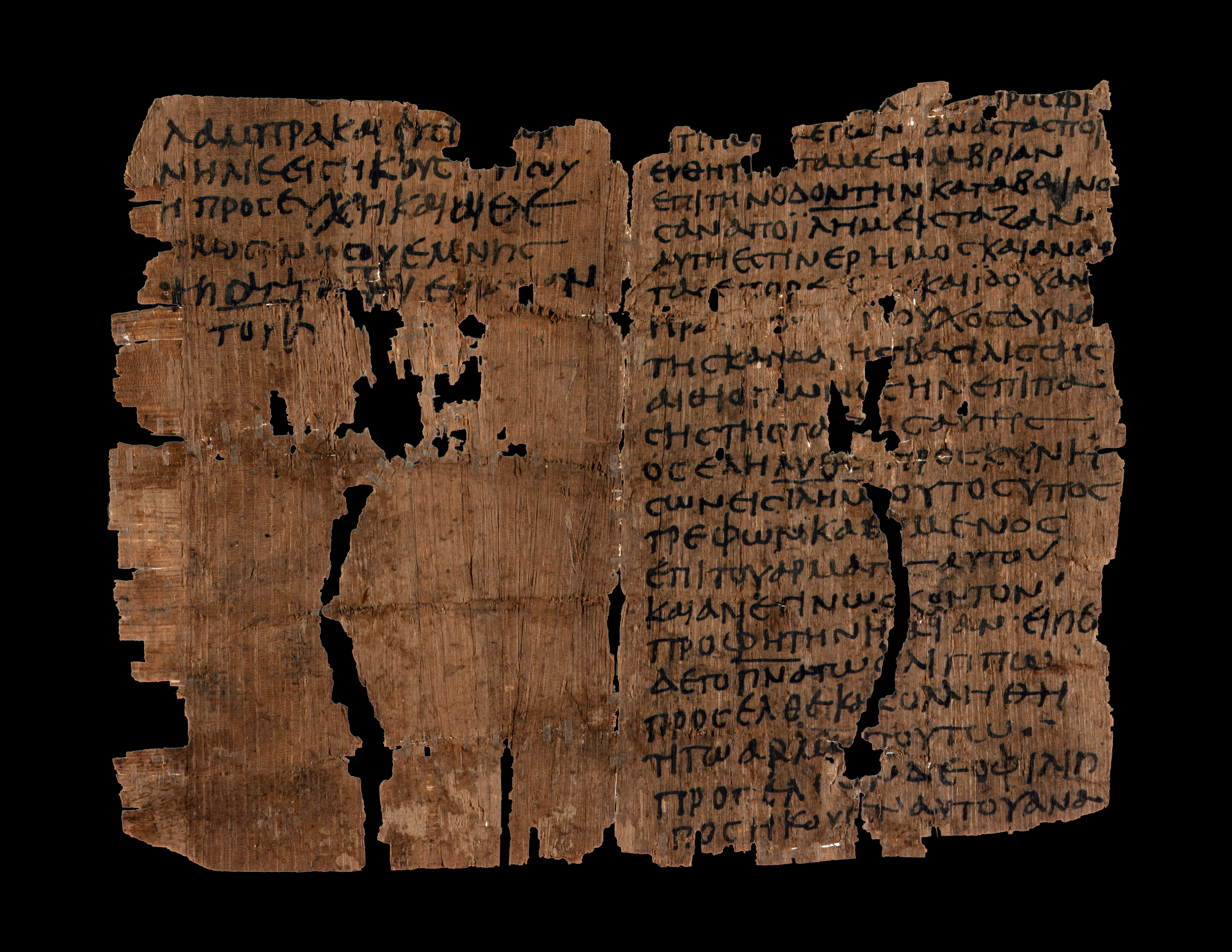
- Acts 10:31 on Papyrus 50, written in 3rd century.
- Book: Acts of the Apostles
- Category: Church history
- Christian Bible part: New Testament
- Order in the Christian part: 5

Acts 10 is the tenth chapter of the Acts of the Apostles in the New Testament of the Christian Bible. Early Christian tradition uniformly affirmed that Luke composed this book as well as the Gospel of Luke. Critical opinion on the tradition was evenly divided at the end of the 20th century. This chapter records the vision of Saint Peter and his meeting with Cornelius in Caesarea.

== Text ==
The original text was written in Koine Greek. This chapter is divided into 48 verses.

=== Textual witnesses ===
Some early manuscripts containing the text of this chapter are:

In Greek

- Papyrus 50 (3rd century; extant verses 26–31)
- Papyrus 53 (3rd century; extant verse 1)
- Codex Vaticanus (325–350)
- Codex Sinaiticus (330–360)
- Codex Bezae (c. 400)
- Codex Alexandrinus (400–440)
- Codex Ephraemi Rescriptus (c. 450; extant verses 1–42)
- Papyrus 127 (5th century; extant verses 32–35, 40–45)
- Codex Laudianus (c. 550)

In Latin

- León palimpsest (7th century; complete)

=== Old Testament references ===
- Acts 10:34: Deuteronomy 10:17
- Acts 10:43: Jeremiah 31:34 and Micah 7:18

=== New Testament references ===
- Acts 10:34: Romans 2:11 and 1 Peter 1:17

== Locations ==
Places mentioned in this chapter (with Jerusalem as reference)

This chapter mentions the following places:

- Joppa
- Caesarea

== Cornelius' vision (10:1–8) ==
Like the story of Saul's conversion, two visionary experiences are involved in the story of Cornelius, each confirming the other. While Peter remained in Joppa (9:43), the focus moves to Caesarea, 32 miles (51 km) north up the coast, to a Roman called Cornelius, belonging to the 'non-commissioned officer class who were the backbone of the Roman army', the 'Italian Cohort' (10:1). Inscriptional evidence shows that this cohort had been in Syria before 69, although there are no precise details about its stationing. Cornelius is 'characterized as a pious man with a godfearing household' (verses 2, 7), and 'his piety is borne out by actions both charitable and religious' (10:2).

=== Verse 2 ===
A devout man, and one that feared God with all his house, which gave much alms to the people, and prayed to God alway.

- "Devout" is translated from the Greek term ευσεβης (eusebēs), which is used rather loosely in Lukan literature to characterize "gentiles who were attracted to the religious practice of Judaism", perhaps from dissatisfaction with Roman polytheism, "but shrank from the rigours of full conversion" (generally called "Godfearers" to distinguish them from "Gentile proselytes who had converted fully to Judaism").
- "Alms": or "charitable gifts".

=== Verse 7 ===
And when the angel who spoke to him had departed, Cornelius called two of his household servants and a devout soldier from among those who waited on him continually.

These "three men" become the emissaries who Peter recognises as "sent by God" in verse 19.

== Peter's vision (10:9–16) ==
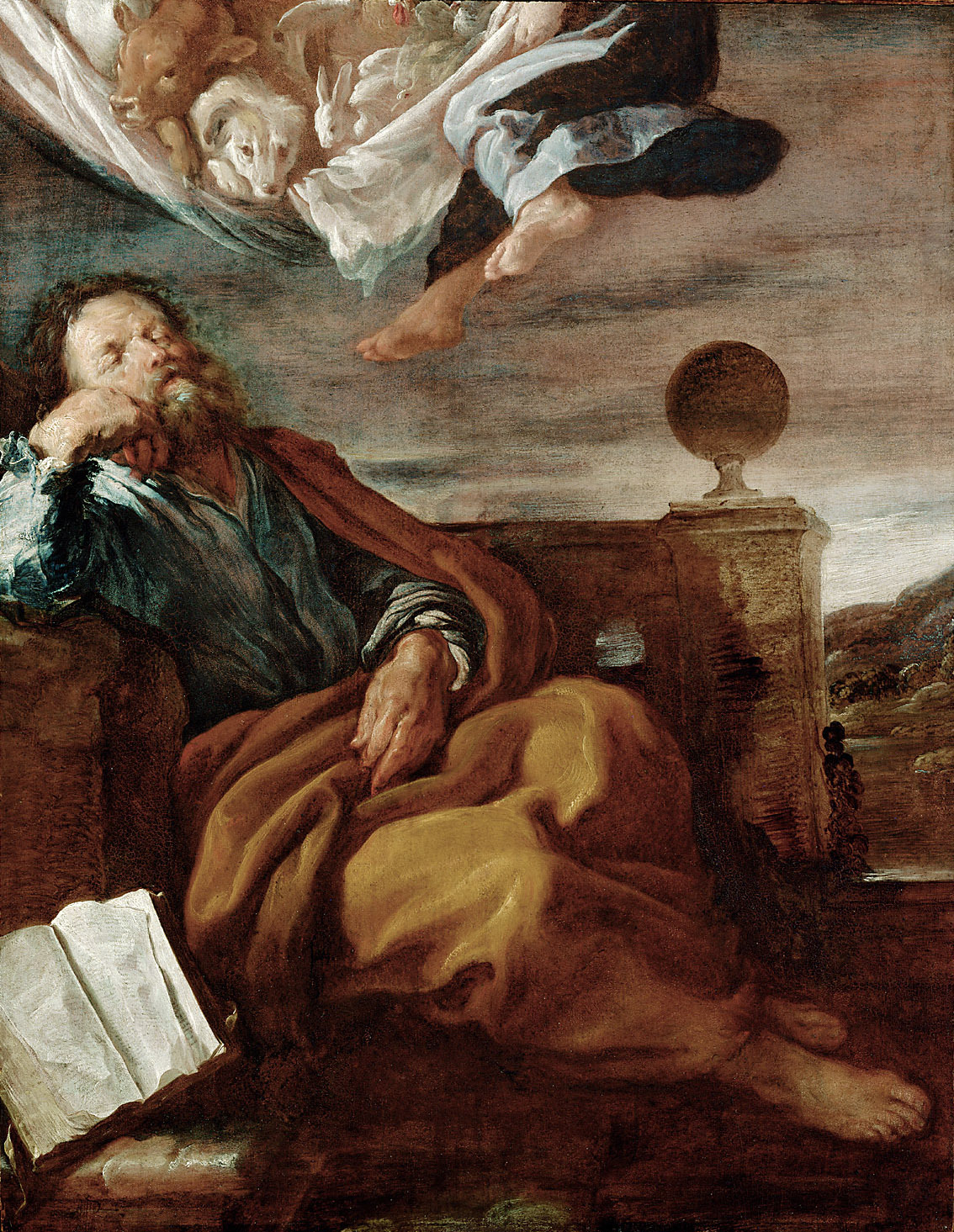
The vision of Peter, painted by Domenico Fetti.

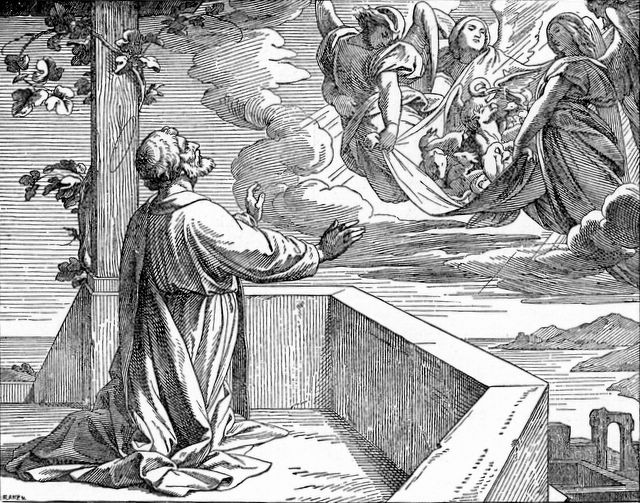
"Peter's vision of the sheet with animals". Illustration from Treasures of the Bible by H. D. Northrop, 1894.

In the story recorded in this section, Saint Peter had a vision of a sheet full of animals being lowered from heaven. A voice from heaven told Peter to kill and eat, but since the sheet contained unclean animals, Peter declined. The command was repeated two more times, along with the voice saying, "What God hath cleansed, that call not thou common" (verse 15) and then the sheet was taken back to heaven (Acts 10:16). The triple refusal here echoes the denial of Peter described in the Synoptic Gospels. At this point in the narrative, messengers sent from Cornelius the Centurion arrive and urge Peter to go with them. He does so, and mentions the vision as he speaks to Cornelius, saying "God hath shewed me that I should not call any man common or unclean" (Acts 10:28, KJV). Peter related the vision again in Acts 11:4–9.

Simon J. Kistemaker suggests that the lesson God taught Peter in this vision is that "God has removed the barriers he once erected to separate his people from the surrounding nations." Kistemaker argues that it means Peter has to accept Gentile believers as full members of the Christian Church, but also that God has made all animals clean, so that "Peter with his fellow Jewish Christians can disregard the food laws that have been observed since the days of Moses." Luke Timothy Johnson and Daniel J. Harrington write that this episode heralds a radical change in Peter's "identity as a member of God's people", but also that "the implication is that all things God created are declared clean by him, and are not affected by human discriminations."

== Peter summoned to Caesarea (10:17-23) ==
Unaware of the vision received by Cornelius, Peter was still up on the roof-top, puzzling over the meaning of the vision he had just seen (10:17,19), when the emissaries of Cornelius knocked at the door downstairs. The Spirit's "direct intervention" leads Peter to go downstairs to meet them (verse 19). Peter, directed that "I have sent them", recognises that these visitors have been sent by God (verse 20), although the connection to his vision was not yet clear.

Peter is instructed to "go with them, doubting nothing" (Greek: μηδεν διακρινομενος, mēden diakrinomenos, in verse 20), an ambiguous verb with double meaning which can simply mean 'without hesitation' (as rendered in the New Revised Standard Version), or without doubt as to the lawfulness of doing so, but also has the sense 'without making distinctions', 'without discrimination' (already implicit in Peter welcoming his gentile guests in verse 23). The messengers convey the message from Cornelius, basically repeating (and therefore reinforcing) the record in the earlier passage, with the additional information that Cornelius was 'well spoken of by the whole Jewish nation' (like the centurion mentioned in Luke 7:5) to underline the fact that he is a Gentile.

== Peter meets Cornelius (10:23-33) ==
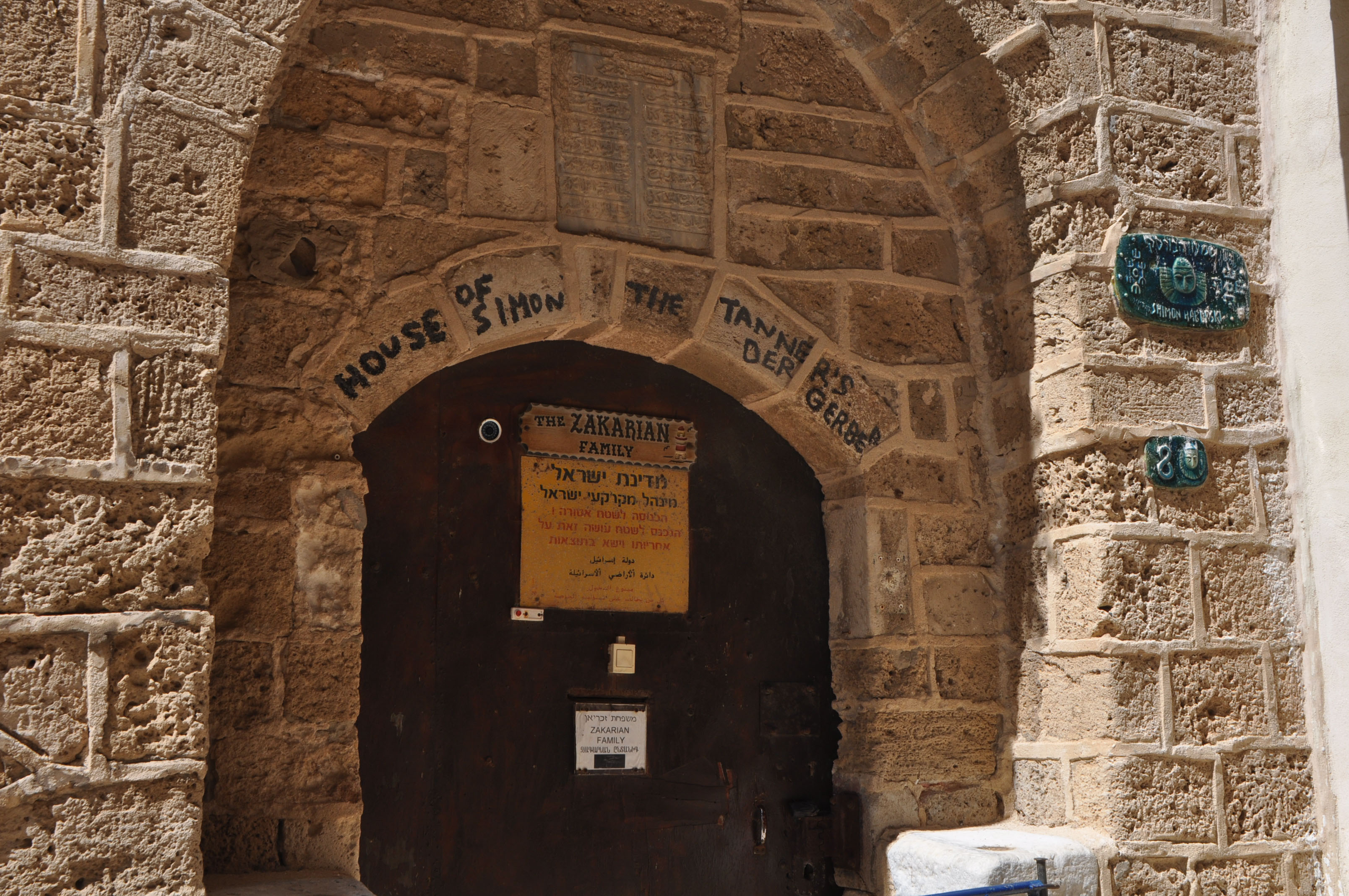
The entrance to Simon the Tanner's house in Joppa (Jaffa), where Peter stayed (Acts 10:32).

The constant repetition of narrative detail emphasizes Peter's dilemma (as in his vision) and helps readers to unfold with him the gradual steps of the new stage in God's plan for the non-Jews. Peter took with him some of the 'brothers' from Joppa (verse 23) to Caesarea which was a full day journey (verse 24). Initially Peter only met the Gentile soldier (verse 7) and the house-servants (probably also Gentile) sent by Cornelius, then in Caesarea he saw a houseful of the centurion's 'relatives and close friends' assembled in his honor (verse 24) and had to take the next decisive step in 'entering a Gentile household' (verse 27). By then, Peter had already made the connection with the animal vision, that the prohibition against calling anything 'common or unclean' is not about food but about people he associates with (verse 28). Cornelius gave a recapitulation of his own vision (verses 30–33) setting up the listeners, poised and expectant 'in the presence of God', to hear what God has commissioned Peter to say (verse 33).

== Peter preaches to the Gentiles (10:34—43) ==
This part records Peter's last evangelistic speech in the book of Acts, comparable to those he spoke in Jerusalem, with the specific burden that God shows no 'partiality' (no preferential treatment between Jew and Gentile) and that people 'in every nation' can be acceptable before God (verse 35; cf. Romans 2:10-11, with the same word) as a subtle adaption for the Caesarean setting. This is the fullest summary of the gospel in Acts: starting in Galilee after John's baptism (verse 37), to the main story of the charismatic power of Jesus' healing ministry (verse 38; only here Luke makes it clear that all healing is seen as liberation from demonic power). As in his Jerusalem speeches (cf. Acts 2:14—36; 3:11—26), Peter repeated the charge that Jesus was 'put to death' (verse 39), without specifying who was responsible (for 'hanging on a tree' cf. Acts 5:30), but with more emphasis on his resurrection (verses 40–41), including a 'reprise of the apostolic commission' (verse 42). God's message is sent first to Israel (verse 36) in form of a small group of witnesses (verse 41) for 'the people' (verse 42, that is, people of Israel), but the message itself is universal, as the final judgement is of 'the living and the dead' (verse 42: cf. 17:31) and the forgiveness of sins is for 'everyone who believes in' Jesus (verse 43), setting the stage for 'an extension of the word of God' to the Gentiles (verse 33).

== The coming of the Spirit in Caesarea (10:44–48) ==
At a precise concluding point of the sermon, the Holy Spirit intervened that 'all who heard the word' (verse 44) experienced the same charismatic experience as the Jewish disciples. This brought an 'astounded' reaction of Peter's Jewish Christian companions from Joppa that 'even Gentiles' (verse 45) can receive the spiritual gift of 'speaking in tongues' (verse 46), which has not been mentioned since the Pentecost experience (Acts 2:4), 'just as we have' (verse 47) to underline the parallel. The logical follow-up was to baptize the Gentile believers (verse 48) as the initiative was God's. The form of the question ('Can anyone withhold?', verse 47) recalls the Ethiopian's question about baptism in Acts 8:37.

=== Verse 48 ===
And he commanded them to be baptized in the name of the Lord. Then they asked him to stay a few days.

- "He commanded them to be baptized": The Greek construction (passive infinitive with accusative subject) could be translated either "he ordered them (that is, 'the Gentiles in Cornelius' house') to be baptized" or "he ordered that they be baptized," that is, Peter was ordering those Jewish Christians who accompanied him to baptize the new Gentile converts.

== See also ==
- Caesarea Maritima
- Cornelius the Centurion
- Joppa
- Peter's vision of a sheet with animals
- Simon Peter
- Related Bible parts: Acts 9, Acts 11, Acts 15

== Sources ==
- Alexander, Loveday (2007). "62. Acts". In Barton, John; Muddiman, John (eds.). The Oxford Bible Commentary (first (paperback) ed.). Oxford University Press. pp. 1028–1061. ISBN 978-0-19-927718-6.
- Coogan, Michael David (2007). Coogan, Michael David; Brettler, Marc Zvi; Newsom, Carol Ann; Perkins, Pheme (eds.). The New Oxford Annotated Bible with the Apocryphal/Deuterocanonical Books: New Revised Standard Version, Issue 48 (Augmented 3rd ed.). Oxford University Press. ISBN 978-0-19-528881-0.
- Johnson, Luke Timothy (1992). Harrington, Daniel J. (ed.). The Acts of the Apostles. Collegeville, MN: Liturgical Press. ISBN 978-0-8146-5807-9.
