= Acts 16 =

- ← chapter 15 chapter 17 →
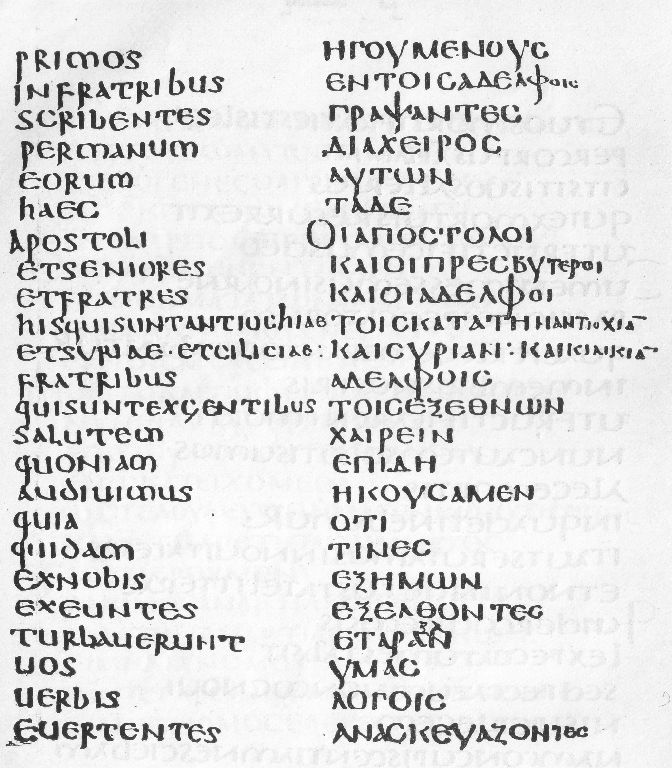
- Acts 15:22–24 in Latin (left column) and Greek (right column) in Codex Laudianus, written about AD 550.
- Book: Acts of the Apostles
- Category: Church history
- Christian Bible part: New Testament
- Order in the Christian part: 5

Acts 16 is the sixteenth chapter of the Acts of the Apostles in the New Testament of the Christian Bible. It records the start of the second missionary journey of Paul, together with Silas and Timothy. Early Christian tradition uniformly affirmed that Luke composed this book as well as the Gospel of Luke. Critical opinion on the tradition was evenly divided at the end of the 20th century.

== Text ==
The original text was written in Koine Greek. This chapter is divided into 40 verses.

=== Textual witnesses ===
Some early manuscripts containing the text of this chapter are:

In Greek

- Codex Vaticanus (AD 325–350)
- Codex Sinaiticus (330–360)
- Codex Bezae (c. 400)
- Codex Alexandrinus (c. 400–440)
- Codex Ephraemi Rescriptus (c. 450; extant verses 1–36)
- Papyrus 127 (5th century; extant verses 1–4, 13–40)
- Codex Laudianus (c. 550)

In Latin

- Codex Laudianus (~550; complete)
- León palimpsest (7th century; complete)

=== New Testament references ===
- Acts 16:1: Romans 16:21
- Acts 16:5: Acts 15:28
- Acts 16:25: 2 Corinthians 11:25 and 1 Thessalonians 2:1

== Locations ==
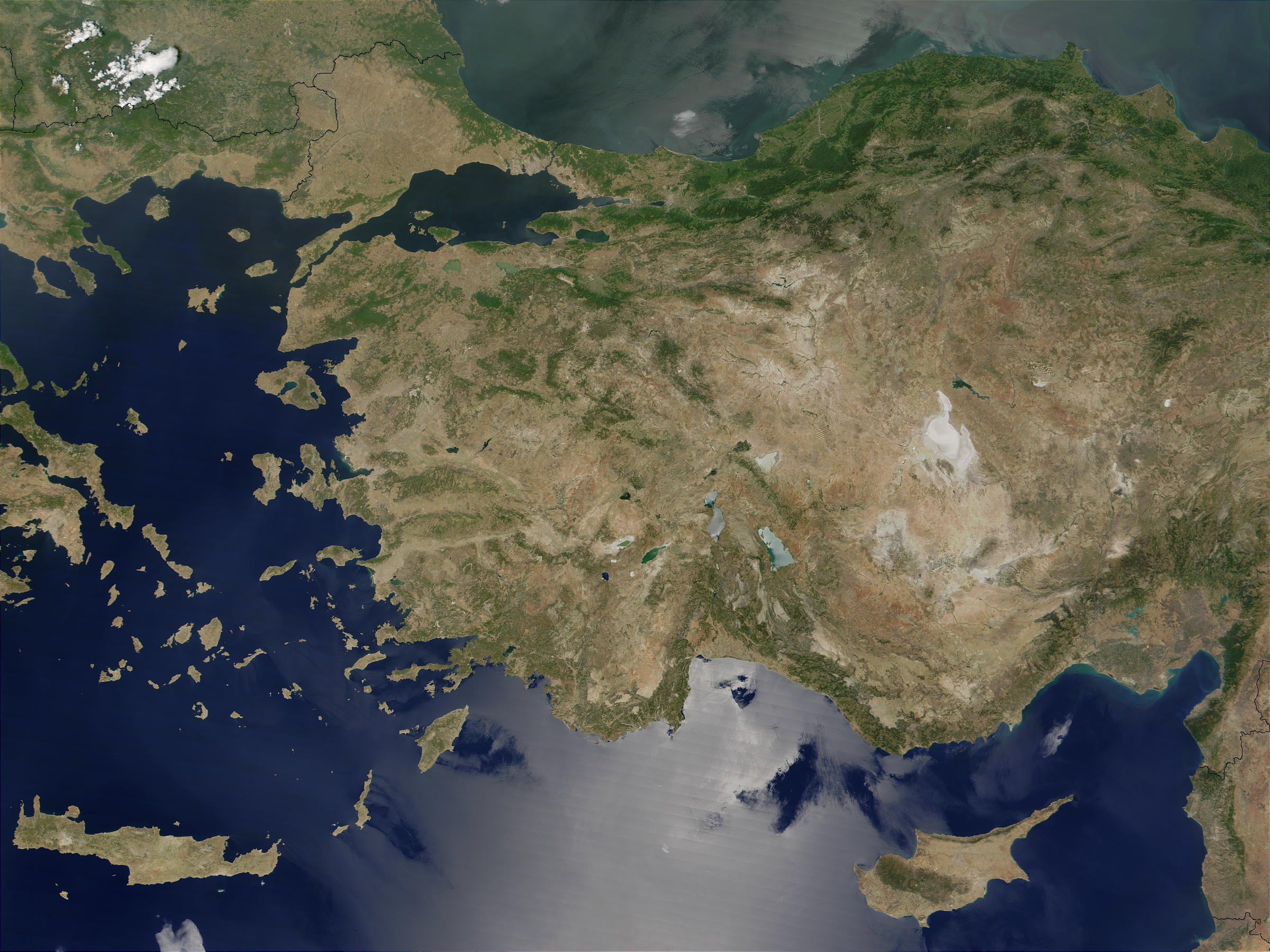
Places mentioned in (blue dots) and related to (red dots) this chapter.

This chapter mentions the following places (in order of appearance):

- Derbe
- Lystra
- Iconium
- Phrygia
- Galatia
- Asia (Roman province)
- Mysia
- Bithynia
- Troas
- Macedonia
- Samothrace
- Neapolis
- Philippi
- Thyatira

== Timeline ==
The second missionary journey of Paul started around AD 49.

== Timothy joins the group (16:1–5) ==
One of Paul's most trusted and well-known co-workers (Romans 16:21), Timothy is mentioned in the epistles to the churches in Rome and Corinth, to the Hebrews and cited as co-author of the letters to Philippi, Thessalonica (2 epistles), Philemon, and Colossae.

=== Verse 1 ===
Then he came to Derbe and Lystra. And behold, a certain disciple was there, named Timothy, the son of a certain Jewish woman who believed, but his father was Greek.

- "Timothy" or "Timotheus" is the son of Eunice, a Jewish woman whose name is mentioned in 2 Timothy 1:5.

=== Verse 4 ===
And as they went through the cities, they delivered to them the decrees to keep, which were determined by the apostles and elders at Jerusalem.

The apostolic decree from the Council of Jerusalem (Greek plural: δογματα (dogmata), commonly used for a "formal decision by a civic assembly") is mentioned for the last time. The decree itself was addressed to "the Gentiles in Antioch, Syria, and Cilicia", but Luke also considered it relevant to the churches in this wider area.

== Journey from Phrygia to Troas (16:6–8) ==
This section records the journey out of Paul's previous mission area ('region of Phrygia and Galatia' in verse 6) in the center and southern part of Anatolia, approaching the north-west corner of Asia Minor following ancient trade routes, one of which reached north of Antioch, leading "westwards down the Lycus Valley towards Ephesus". The Roman roads north of Antioch in Pisidia were built in a later period. At two points, the direction of the travel was determined by the Holy Spirit (verse 6); the term is "clearly interchangeable" with "the Spirit of Jesus" (verse 7): firstly, not to take the road that could lead westward to Smyrna, and secondly not to take the other road leading northwards to Bithynia and Pontus, but to follow the road towards Troas.

The absence of a preaching account along this part of the journey indicates that they were continually waiting for guidance, which finally came to Paul when they arrived in the port city of Troas, in a vision of a call for help from the man of Macedonia.

== The man of Macedonia (16:9–10) ==
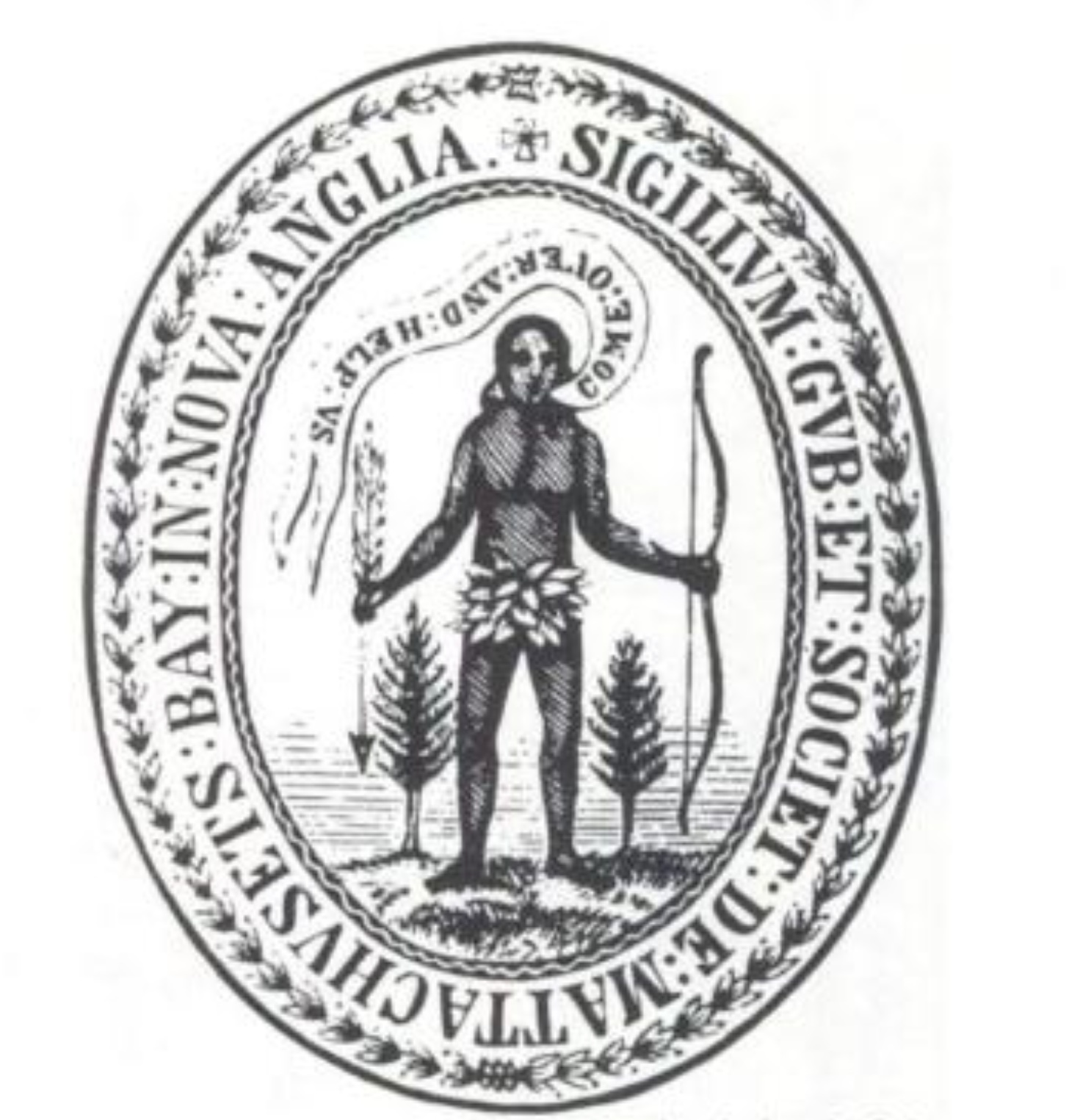
Seal of the Massachusetts Bay Colony, (1629–1686, 1689–1691)

Verse 9 records a vision in which the Paul is said to have seen a 'man of Macedonia' pleading with him to "come over to Macedonia and help" them. Although it came at night, Paul is said to have a "vision", not a dream (in New Testament, dreams were only linked to Joseph and Pontius Pilate's wife). The passage reports that Paul and his companions responded immediately to the invitation. It is considered to echo Joshua 10:6 in which the men of Gibeon sent to Joshua saying " ... come up to us quickly, save us and help us". The first seal of Massachusetts Bay Colony had an American Indian with a scroll coming out over his mouth with the words "Come over and help us", also said to echo the words of the man of Macedonia.

=== Verse 9 ===
And a vision appeared to Paul in the night. A man of Macedonia stood and pleaded with him, saying, "Come over to Macedonia and help us."

- "Macedonia": probably the same region as later applied to the Roman province, which included the ancient Macedonia, Illyricum, Epirus, and Thessaly. This was the door for Paul to bring the faith of Christ from Asia to Europe, and the cry, "Come over and help us," could be considered by Paul as a call from the whole western world.

== Journey from Troas to Philippi (16:11-15) ==
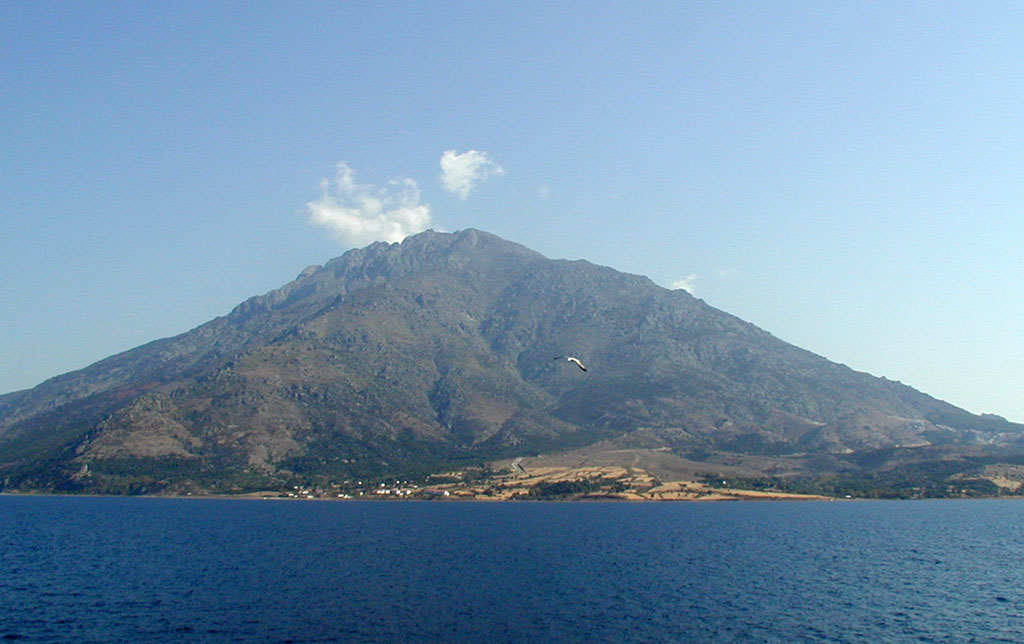
Samothrace, with Mount Fengari in the background.

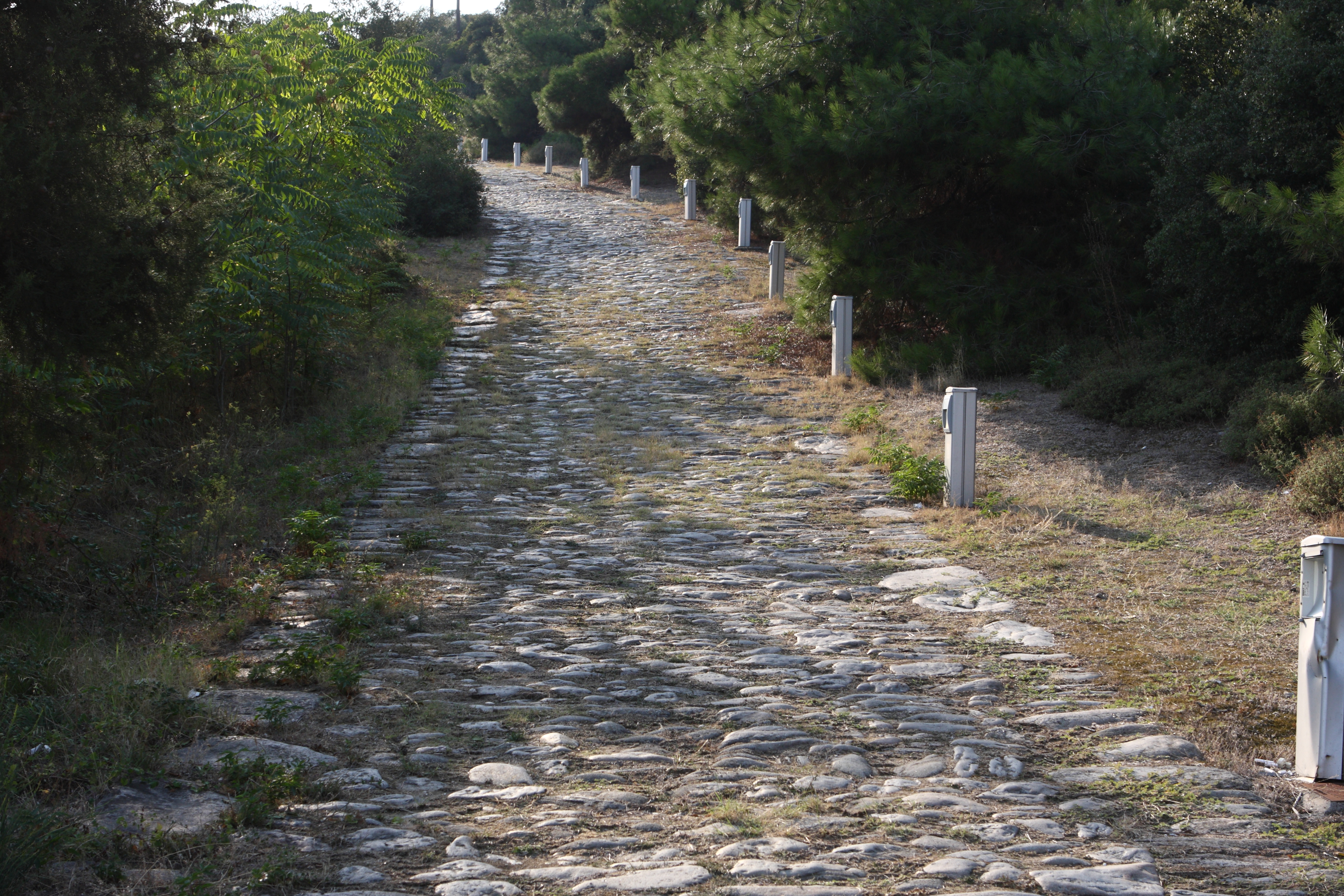
Ancient Via Egnatia in Kavala (ancient Neapolis).

The details of sea travel include the specific jargon of seafaring ('set sail', 'took a straight course', verse 11) and every port of call (Samothrace, Neapolis). From Neapolis, the journey is by land along Via Egnatia, the Roman road connecting the northern Aegean cities (Philippi, as well as Amphipolis, Apollonia, and Thessalonica in Acts 17:1) to the ports at Adriatic Sea.

=== Verse 12 ===
and from there to Philippi, which is the foremost city of that part of Macedonia, a colony. And we were staying in that city for some days.

Philippi was a Roman colony, originally settled by Roman army veterans with Roman magistrates and laws.

- "Foremost": translated from Greek πρώτη, prōtē, which also means "first".

=== Verse 13 ===
And on the Sabbath day we went outside the gate to the riverside, where we supposed there was a place of prayer, and we sat down and spoke to the women who had come together.

- "Place of prayer": translated from Greek: προσευχή, proseuché , also meaning "prayer", which may indicate a synagogue, but if the Jewish community there was not large enough to establish a synagogue, it may mean a 'less formal meeting-place' of prayer. Evidence from first-century writings indicates that Jewish communities usually meet 'close to running water' (cf. Josephus. Ant. 14:258).

=== Verse 14 ===
And a certain woman named Lydia, a seller of purple, of the city of Thyatira, which worshipped God, heard us: whose heart the Lord opened, that she attended unto the things which were spoken of Paul.

The independent status of Lydia as a trader and householder (verse 15) was not unusual for women among the 'traveling merchants and artisans' in most Greek cities of the ancient world and such women often became 'patron and benefactor to Jewish and other immigrant communities'.

== The woman of Philippi and the spirit of divination (16:16–24) ==
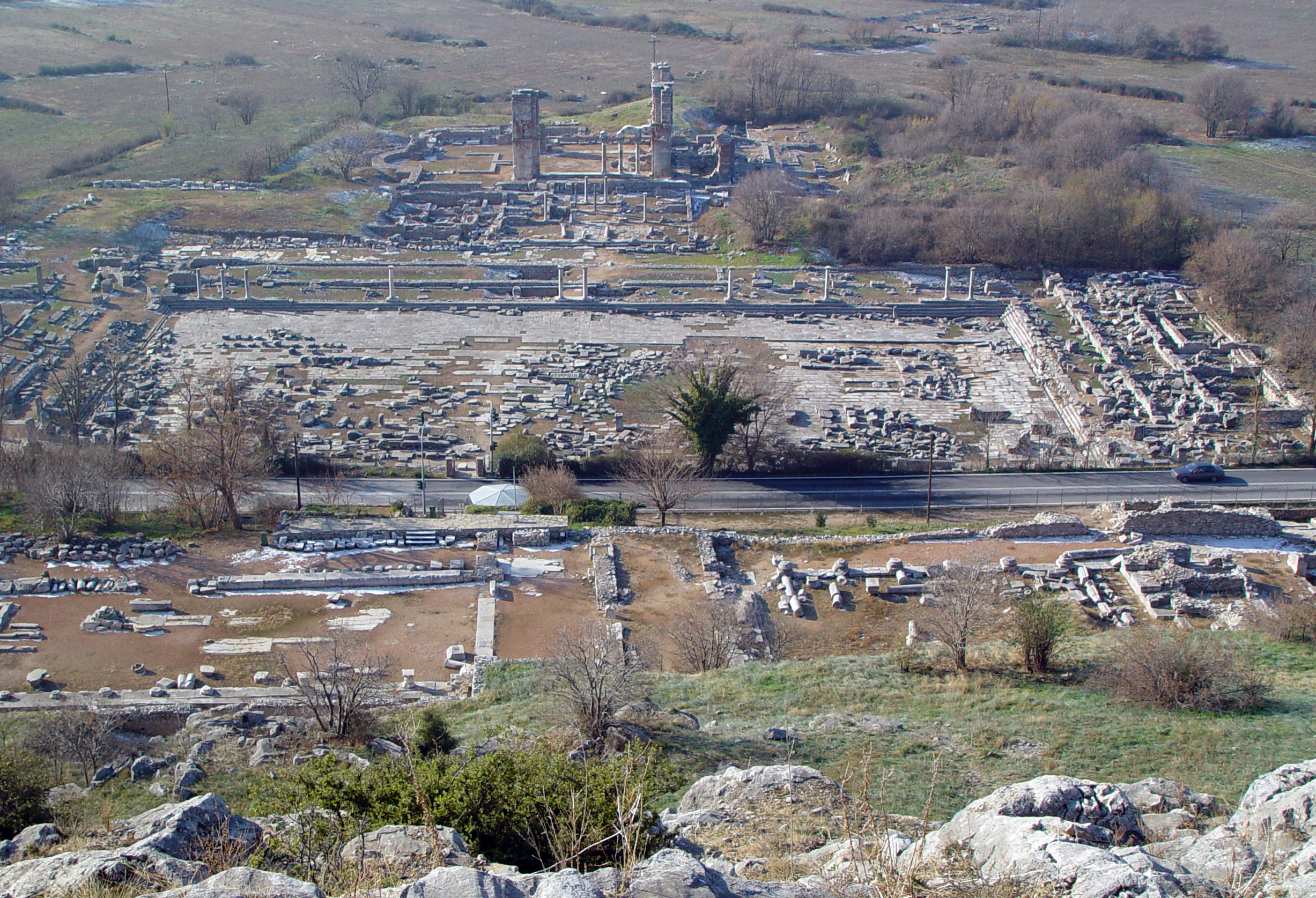
Ruins of the ancient Philippi city center; the Forum in the foreground, the market and the Basilica in the background.

=== Verses 16 to 18 ===
Now it happened, as we went to prayer, that a certain slave girl possessed with a spirit of divination met us, who brought her masters much profit by fortune-telling. This girl followed Paul and us, and cried out, saying, "These men are the servants of the Most High God, who proclaim to us the way of salvation." And this she did for many days. But Paul, greatly annoyed, turned and said to the spirit, "I command you in the name of Jesus Christ to come out of her." And he came out that very hour.

The passage refers of woman who was possessed by a spirit of divination, whose nature remains unclear. Paul ordered to the spirit to come out of her and this happened in the Name of Jesus Christ, like apostles were called to do against demons (Mark 16:16–18). Nevertheless, the spirit of divination (Ancient Greek: πνεῦμα Πύθωνα, romanized: pneuma Pythōna) affirmed for some days that Paul and Silas were servants of the Most High God.

== The saving of the jailer in Philippi (16:25—34) ==
The dramatic scenes of Paul's imprisonment and escape in Philippi mirrors Peter's experience in Jerusalem (Acts 12:6—17). The singing hymn in prison is similar to the act of the philosopher Socrates (Epict. Diss. 2.6.26—7) and the rescue by divine intervention because of faithfulness to God is like that of the prophet Daniel and his friends (cf. Daniel 3, Daniel 6). Instead of escaping during earthquake, Paul honorably stayed inside (by implication also keeping the other prisoners in place) so he could prevent the jailer to commit a shame-induced suicide (verse 28) and brought change in this person's life: treating his prisoners with honor (verse 30; disregarding his original orders in verse 23), washing their wounds (verse 33) and inquiring them about salvation (verse 30). Paul's 'shameful experience of prison' was turned into a successful mission (verse 32), even in the middle of the night (verses 25, 33), that the jailer 'with his entire household' became a 'paradigmatic convert' (stressed three times in verses 32, 33, 34), baptized, 'sharing table-fellowship', and 'rejoicing' (verses 33, 34).

=== Verse 31 ===
So they said, “Believe on the Lord Jesus Christ, and you will be saved, you and your household.”

== The shaming of the magistrates (16:35-40) ==
When the 'police' (Greek: rhabdouchoi, "lictors", verse 35) came to order the jailer to release him, Paul chose this time to reveal his Roman citizenship (cf. Acts 22:22–29; 25:1–12), which higher standards of legal treatment than other people in the empire should prevent him and his companion to be publicly humiliated, and the violation of this could result in severe punishment for the magistrates (verse 37). A complete role-reversal then happened with the magistrates coming to 'apologize' to Paul (better translation: "implore", from Greek: parekalesan, verse 39), vindicating Paul's faithfulness to God who can turn around potentially humiliating situations into honor.

== See also ==
- Lydia of Thyatira
- Paul the Apostle
- Silas
- Timothy
- Acts 14, Acts 15, Second Letter to Timothy

== Sources ==
- Alexander, Loveday (2007). "62. Acts". In Barton, John; Muddiman, John (eds.). The Oxford Bible Commentary (first (paperback) ed.). Oxford University Press. pp. 1028–1061. ISBN 978-0199277186.
- Coogan, Michael David (2007). Coogan, Michael David; Brettler, Marc Zvi; Newsom, Carol Ann; Perkins, Pheme (eds.). The New Oxford Annotated Bible with the Apocryphal/Deuterocanonical Books: New Revised Standard Version, Issue 48 (Augmented 3rd ed.). Oxford University Press. ISBN 9780195288810.
