= Acts 12 =

- ← chapter 11 chapter 13 →
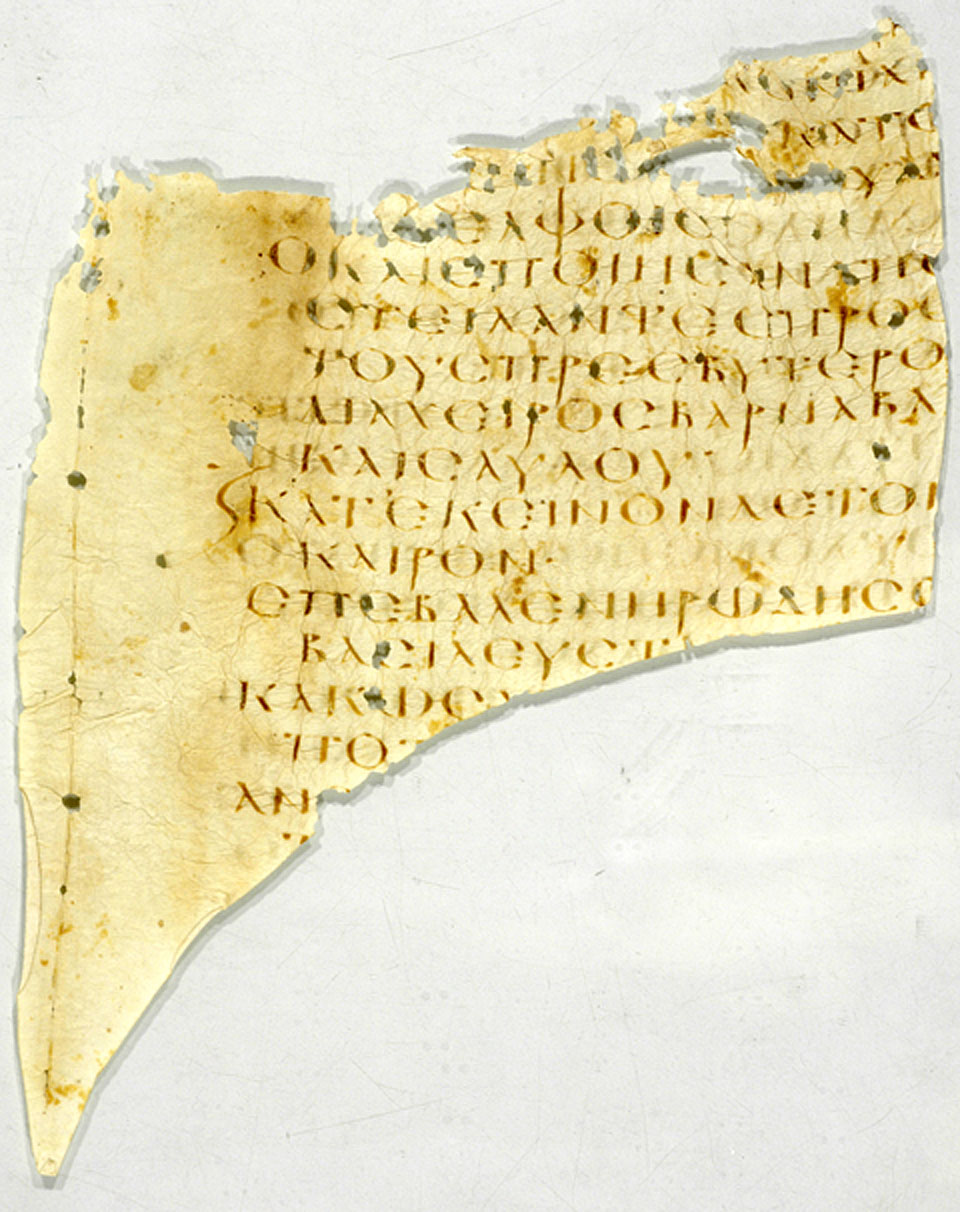
- Acts 11:29–12:2 on the recto side of Uncial 0244 (Gregory-Aland) from the 5th century.
- Book: Acts of the Apostles
- Category: Church history
- Christian Bible part: New Testament
- Order in the Christian part: 5

Acts 12 is the twelfth chapter of the Acts of the Apostles in the New Testament of the Christian Bible. It records the death of the first apostle, James, son of Zebedee, followed by the miraculous escape of Peter from prison, the death of Herod Agrippa I, and the early ministry of Barnabas and Paul of Tarsus. Early Christian tradition uniformly affirmed that Luke composed this book as well as the Gospel of Luke. Critical opinion on the tradition was evenly divided at the end of the 20th century.

== Text ==
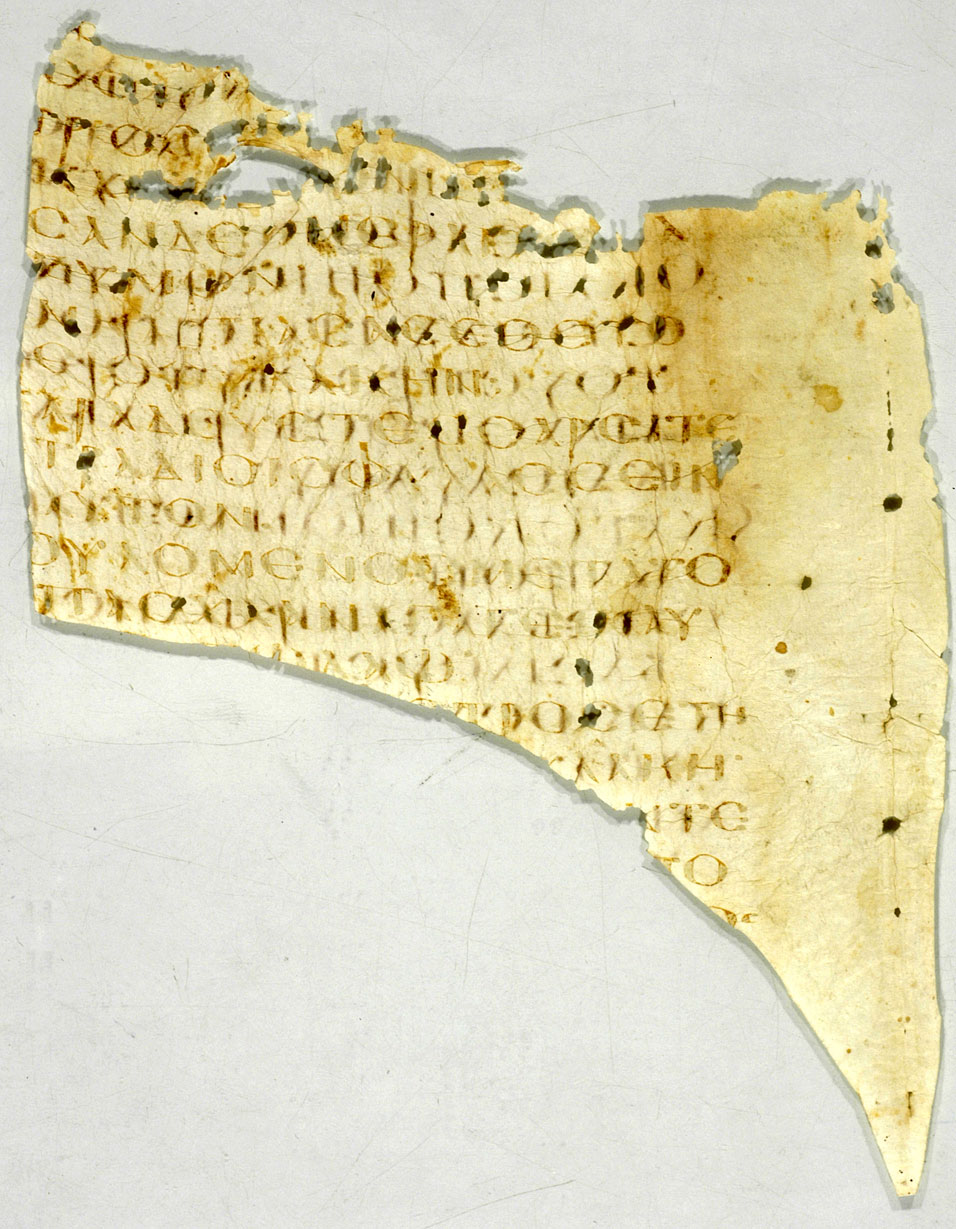
Acts 12:3–5 on the verso side of Uncial 0244 (Gregory-Aland) from the 5th century.

The original text was written in Koine Greek. This chapter is divided into 25 verses.

Some early manuscripts containing the text of this chapter are:

- Codex Vaticanus (AD 325–350)
- Codex Sinaiticus (330–360)
- Codex Bezae (~400)
- Papyrus 127 (5th century; extant verses 1–3, 5, 7–9)
- Codex Alexandrinus (400–440)
- Codex Laudianus (~550).

== Locations ==
Places mentioned in this chapter

This chapter mentions the following places:

- Caesarea
- Jerusalem
- Judea
- Sidon
- Tyre

== Herod persecutes the apostles (verses 1–5) ==
Sometime after the events in the previous chapter, the apostles in Jerusalem are harassed by a new persecution (12:1) by a "Herod", not Herod Antipas, who was involved in the trial of Jesus (Luke 23:6–12; Acts 4:27) but Agrippa I, a grandson of Herod the Great, resulting in the killing of James the son of Zebedee and the imprisonment of Simon Peter.

=== Verse 1 ===
It was about this time that King Herod arrested some who belonged to the church, intending to persecute them.

Heinrich Meyer suggests that these events took place in 44 AD, the year of the death of Herod Agrippa, at the same time as the prophets from Jerusalem travelled to Antioch and returned with aid for the Judean church. J. R. Lumby, in the Cambridge Bible for Schools and Colleges suggests "some time near 43 AD", and the Jerusalem Bible assigns them to "between 41 and 44". John Stott holds that Luke was "deliberately vague" in regard to timing.

=== Verses 2-3 ===
^{2} He killed James the brother of John with the sword, ^{3} and when he saw that it pleased the Jews, he proceeded to arrest Peter also. This was during the days of Unleavened Bread.

Josephus states that Herod Antipas had been "more friendly to the Greeks than to the Jews", but Herod Agrippa (here) sought the approval of the Jews and, in this respect, was "not at all like" his predecessor. James was probably beheaded.

=== Verse 4 ===
And when he had seized him, he put him in prison, delivering him over to four squads of soldiers to guard him, intending after the Passover to bring him out to the people.

The King James Version has Herod intending to bring Peter before the people "after Easter". The Greek text reads μετὰ τὸ πάσχα (meta to pascha). Albert Barnes argues that "there never was a more absurd or unhappy translation than" the word "Easter" here. J. R. Lumby is more supportive of the translation:

The rendering "Easter" is an attempt to give by an English word the notion of the whole feast. That this meaning and not the single day of the Paschal feast is intended by the Greek seems clear from the elaborate preparation made, as for a longer imprisonment than was the rule among the Jews. Peter was arrested at the commencement of the Passover feast (14th of Nisan), and the king's intention was to proceed to sentence and punish him when the feast was at an end on the 21st of Nisan.

== Peter freed from prison (verses 6–11) ==
This part of the chapter tells that after Peter was put into prison by King Herod, on the night before his trial an angel appeared to him, and told him to leave. Peter's chains fell off, and he followed the angel out of prison, thinking it was a vision (verse 9). The prison doors opened of their own accord, and the angel led Peter into the city.

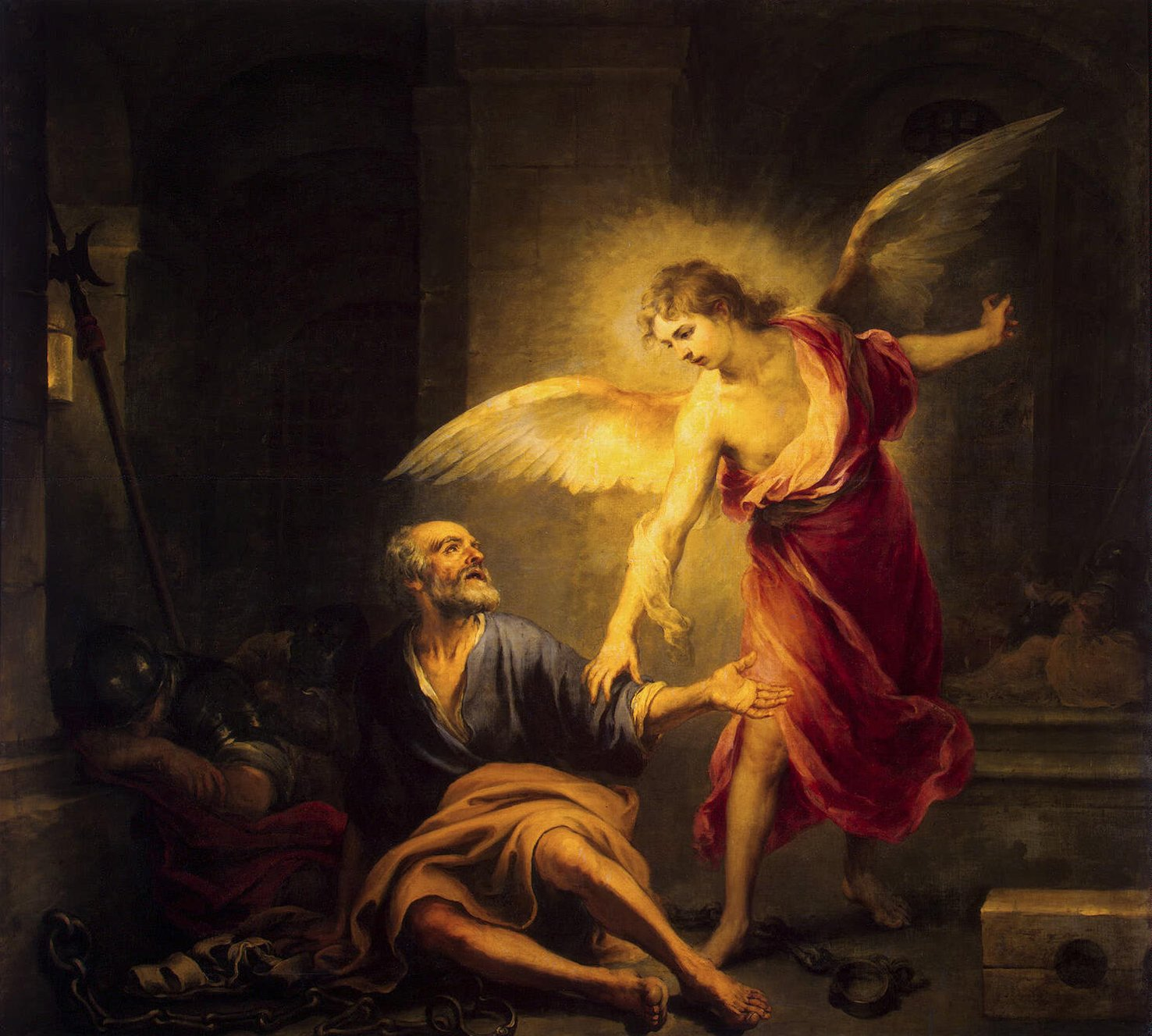
Bartolomé Esteban Murillo, Liberation of St. Peter

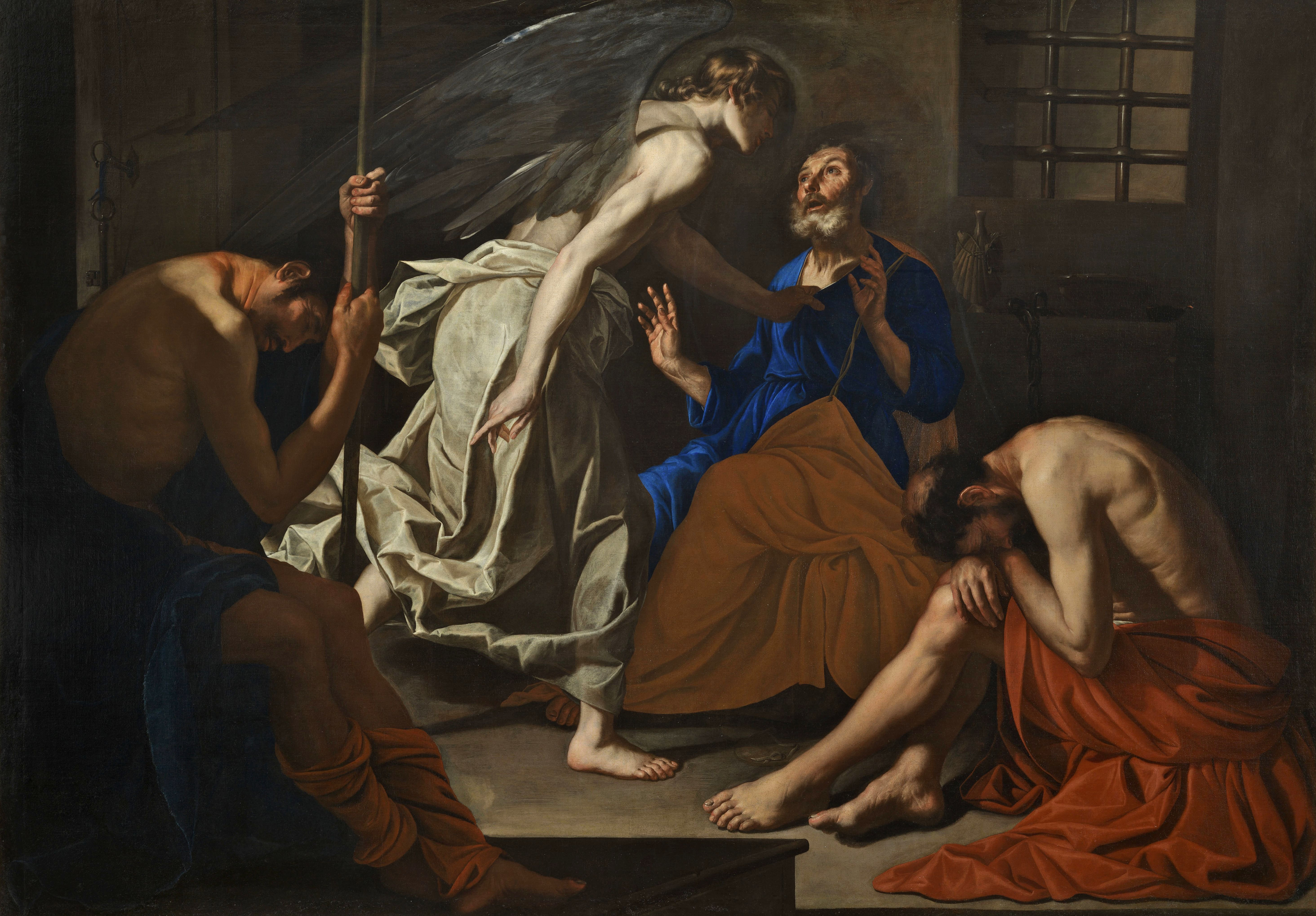
Antonio de Bellis, The Liberation of St. Peter.

=== Verse 7 ===
Now behold, an angel of the Lord stood by him, and a light shone in the prison; and he struck Peter on the side and raised him up, saying, “Arise quickly!” And his chains fell off his hands.

This verse is referred to in Charles Wesley's hymn And Can It Be.

== Peter's reception by the church (verses 12–17) ==
Peter's reception by the church in this account has an element of humor that far from expecting their prayers to be answered, the believers are completely taken aback when Peter knocks at the door that the maid Rhoda (another minor character noted by Luke) runs back to the house instead of quickly opening the door, so despite his supernatural escape, when prison doors were opened up for him, the house doors 'remain obstinately closed' for Peter.

=== Verse 12 ===
Thinking about that, he came to the house of Mary, the mother of John who was called Mark, where many were gathered together and were praying.

- "Thinking about that" is translated from Greek συνιδών, synidōn, "having considered [it]", "after [he] had perceived [it]" or "after [he] had weighed [it]" (Vulgate: considerans).

=== Verse 17 ===
But motioning to them with his hand to keep silent, he declared to them how the Lord had brought him out of the prison. And he said, "Go, tell these things to James and to the brethren." And he departed and went to another place.

- "Motioning... with his hand" (KJV: "Beckoning...with the hand"): translates the Greek phrase Κατασείειν τῇ χειρί, kataseisas tē cheiri, "to make a shaking motion with the hand" (cf. Acts 13:16, Acts 19:33, Acts 21:40), to indicate 'a wish to bring forward something', seeking 'the silence and attention of those present'.

== Herod's reaction (verses 18–19) ==
The account's focus returns briefly back to the prison, where Herod, "depicted as a typical persecuting tyrant", vents his frustration on the guards. In verse 19 he orders them to be "led away" (ἀπαχθῆναι, apachthēnai), by implication to their deaths. There is an irony in the situation, in that "neither the soldiers nor Herod share the readers' privileged knowledge of Peter's secret" and whereabouts. Through no fault of their own they earn the punishment intended for their escaped prisoner.

== Death of Herod ==
Herod's sensational death (verses 20–23) was well documented in Josephus' Antiquities of the Jews (19.343-50), and while it is independent from Luke's account, both report him "dying a horrible death as a punishment for being acclaimed as divine".

=== Verse 20 ===
Now Herod had been very angry with the people of Tyre and Sidon; but they came to him with one accord, and having made Blastus the king’s personal aide their friend, they asked for peace, because their country was supplied with food by the king's country.

Luke provides a political setting for his account of Herod's death, which, though not present in Josephus' account, is "not implausible". Meyer notes that θυμομαχῶν (thymomachōn, "furiously angry") can denote either warfare or some other kind of enmity. He suggests that "an actual war" between Herod and the Roman confederate cities of Tyre and Sidon was "very improbable", reading their desire for peace as a desire for "the preservation of the peace".

=== Verse 23 ===
Then immediately an angel of the Lord struck him, because he did not give glory to God. And he was eaten by worms and died.

- "Him" and "he" refer to Herod Agrippa I
- "Died" or "breathed his last".

== Summary and transition (verses 24–25) ==
This part contrasts the death of the persecutor with the successful growth of God's word (verse 24) with the expansion of the church (cf. 9:31) by God's power. Verse 25 provides a narrative link of the completed relief mission by the major characters from this point on as they return to Antioch.

=== Verse 25 ===
And Barnabas and Saul returned from Jerusalem when they had fulfilled their ministry, and they also took with them John whose surname was Mark.

- "From Jerusalem": some manuscripts (Note: Codex Sinaiticus, Codex Vaticanus, Codex Angelicus, and miniscules 81, 1241, and 1505, according to the 28th edition of the Nestle-Aland Greek New Testament) read 'to' Jerusalem, linking it with 'mission' rather than with 'returned', thus rendering this 'returned (i.e. to Antioch) having completed their service (diakonia) to Jerusalem'.

== See also ==
- Barnabas
- Caesarea Maritima
- James, son of Zebedee
- John Mark
- Paul of Tarsus
- Acts 9, Acts 13, and Acts 15

== Sources ==
- Alexander, Loveday (2007). "62. Acts". In Barton, John; Muddiman, John (eds.). The Oxford Bible Commentary (first (paperback) ed.). Oxford University Press. pp. 1028–1061. ISBN 978-0199277186.
