= Acts 15 =

- ← chapter 14 chapter 16 →
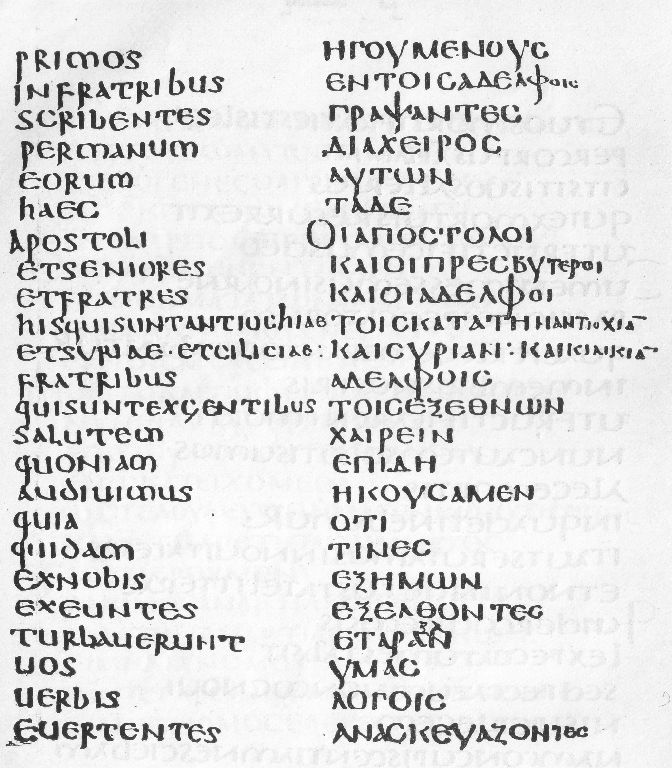
- Acts 15:22–24 in Latin (left column) and Greek (right column) in Codex Laudianus, written about AD 550.
- Book: Acts of the Apostles
- Category: Church history
- Christian Bible part: New Testament
- Order in the Christian part: 5

Acts 15 is the fifteenth chapter of the Acts of the Apostles in the New Testament of the Christian Bible. It records "the first great controversy in the records of the Christian Church", concerning the necessity of circumcision, Paul and Barnabas traveling to Jerusalem to attend the Council of Jerusalem and the beginning of Paul's second missionary journey. Early Christian tradition uniformly affirmed that Luke composed this book as well as the Gospel of Luke. Critical opinion on the tradition was evenly divided at the end of the 20th century.

== Text ==
The original text was written in Koine Greek. This chapter is divided into 41 verses.

=== Textual witnesses ===
Some early manuscripts containing the text of this chapter are:

In Greek

- Codex Vaticanus (AD 325–350)
- Codex Sinaiticus (330–360)
- Codex Bezae (c. 400)
- Codex Alexandrinus (400–440)
- Codex Ephraemi Rescriptus (c. 450)
- Papyrus 127 (5th century; extant verses 29–30, 34–41)
- Codex Laudianus (c. 550; complete)
- Papyrus 33 (c. 550)

In Latin

- Codex Laudianus (~550; complete)
- León palimpsest (7th century; complete)

=== Old Testament references ===
- Acts 15:16: Amos 9:11

=== New Testament references ===
- Acts 15:7: Acts 10:20 and Acts 11:13
- Acts 15:9: Acts 10:43 and 1 Corinthians 1:2
- Acts 15:10: Matthew 23:4

== Locations ==
Places mentioned in (blue) and related to (black) this chapter.

This chapter mentions the following places (in order of appearance):

- Judea
- Phoenicia
- Samaria
- Jerusalem
- Antioch, Syria
- Pamphylia
- Cyprus
- Cilicia

== Timeline ==
The journey of Paul and Barnabas to Jerusalem and the Council of Jerusalem is generally considered to have taken place around 48 – 50 AD. Robert Witham dated it to 51 AD.

== Conflict over circumcision (15:1–5) ==
The circumcision controversy began in Antioch, when 'certain men' (Greek: τινες, certain 'people' in the NIV translation) came from Judea teaching that salvation was dependent on circumcision according to the Mosaic law. The People's New Testament Commentary called them 'the Judaizing Teachers'; Paul called them and others with the same teaching 'false brethren secretly brought in'.

The dispute which arose resulted in a decision to send Paul and Barnabas to Jerusalem, to seek a resolution to the issue. In Jerusalem the pro-circumcision case was argued by 'some of the sect of the Pharisees who believed'.

== Council of Jerusalem (15:6–29) ==
The account of the Jerusalem Council is bracketed by the scenes in Antioch (verses 1–5 opening; verses 30–35 closing) as an indication that the narrator shifted from Jerusalem to Antioch as 'home ground', and might not have access to the developments in Jerusalem since Peter left that city in Acts 12:17.

=== Verse 13 ===
And after they had become silent, James answered, saying, "Men and brethren, listen to me:"

The council listened to James because he was the first of the three pillars of church (see Galatians 2:9). He was the leader of the church in Jerusalem until he was stoned to death at the insistence of the high priest in 62 AD. James was the Lord Jesus Christ's half brother, the one who did not believe until the Lord appeared to him privately after the Resurrection (see 1 Corinthians 15:7).

=== Verse 14 ===
Simon has declared how God first visited the Gentiles to take from among them a people for His name.

- "Simon" here from Greek text Συμεὼν, Symeōn, which is used for Simon Peter only here and in 2 Peter 1:1.

=== Verse 23 ===
This is the letter delivered by them: "The apostles and the presbyters, your brothers, to the brothers in Antioch, Syria, and Cilicia of Gentile origin: greetings".

The letter was addressed to non-Jewish believers in Antioch, Syria, and Cilicia. Its wider relevance was confirmed in Acts 16:4, where Paul and Silas endorse its compliance across a wider area.

== Return to Antioch (15:30–35) ==
Armed with the apostolic decree, Paul and Barnabas triumphantly returned to Antioch, accompanied by the Jerusalem delegates, Judas (surnamed Barsabbas) and Silas (verses 22, 32), who provided encouragement and strengthening (cf. Acts 14:22), just like Barnabas, who was originally sent from Jerusalem to Antioch (Acts 11:22–24).

== Paul and Barnabas part company (15:36–41) ==
This section opens the account of Paul's second journey (Acts 15:36–18:23), which started after an unspecified interval (verse 36: τινας ἡμέρας, tinas hēmeras, literally "some days"), and without the formal commissioning ceremony recorded for his first journey (Acts 13:3). E. H. Plumptre refers to a "commonly received chronology" according to which the journey commenced "somewhat more than a year" after the Council held in Jerusalem.

The proposed tour was simply intended to revisit converts from the previous mission ("the brethren", or "our brethren" in the King James Version but not in critical Greek texts of the New Testament).

Paul parted ways with Barnabas before the departure (verses 37–39), and Barnabas disappears from the remaining chapters of Acts, although Paul mentions him in his first epistle to the Corinthians (1 Corinthians 9:6). Silas of Jerusalem (also called "Silvanus" in Latinized form), who is a 'prophet' and anointed by the Holy Spirit (Acts 15:32; like Paul and Barnabas), became Paul's new companion (verse 40). Paul and Silas began the journey through the Taurus Mountains passing Paul's home territory of Cilicia (verse 41), following the route along southern Anatolia (now Turkey) across the Cilician Gates. Later, they evangelized Macedonia and Achaea (1 Thessalonians 1:1; 2 Corinthians 1:19).

== See also ==
- Antioch, Syria
- Barnabas
- Cilicia
- Council of Jerusalem
- Cyprus
- John Mark
- Judea
- Pamphylia
- Paul the Apostle
- Phoenicia
- Samaria
- Silas
- Related Bible parts: Acts 14, 1 Corinthians 15, Galatians 2

== Sources ==
- Alexander, Loveday (2007). "62. Acts". In Barton, John; Muddiman, John (eds.). The Oxford Bible Commentary (first (paperback) ed.). Oxford University Press. pp. 1028–1061. ISBN 978-0199277186.
- Coogan, Michael David (2007). Coogan, Michael David; Brettler, Marc Zvi; Newsom, Carol Ann; Perkins, Pheme (eds.). The New Oxford Annotated Bible with the Apocryphal/Deuterocanonical Books: New Revised Standard Version, Issue 48 (Augmented 3rd ed.). Oxford University Press. ISBN 9780195288810.
