= Papyrus 50 =

Papyrus 𝔓^{50}
- New Testament manuscript
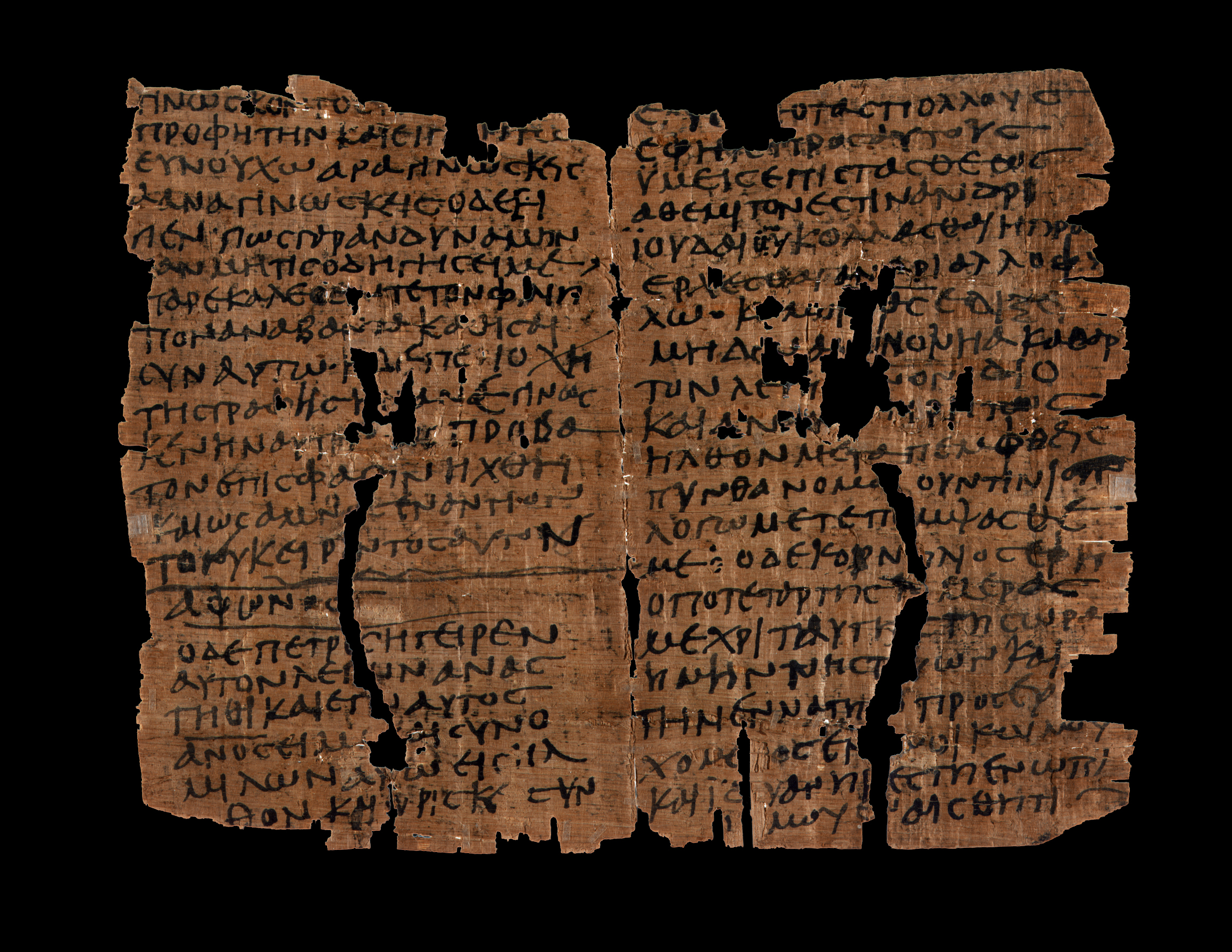
- Recto Acts 8:30-32, 10:26-30
- Text: Acts of the Apostles 8; 10 †
- Date: c. 200-400 (if real)
- Script: Greek
- Found: Egypt
- Now at: Yale University Library
- Cite: C. H. Kraeling, Two Selections from Acts, pp. 163-172.
- Size: 13.8 x 17.7 cm
- Type: mixed
- Category: III
- Note: This Manuscript is thought to be a Fake.

Papyrus 50 (Gregory-Aland), designated by 𝔓^{50}, is an early copy of a small part of the New Testament in Greek. It is a papyrus manuscript of the Acts of the Apostles, it contains Acts 8:26-32; 10:26-31. The manuscript palaeographically has been assigned to the 3rd/4th century. Elijah Hixson suggests that the manuscript may possibly be a forgery based on anomalies in line spacing, some text seeming to wrap around lacunae, and serious issues with fiber alignment in the papyrus.

== Description ==
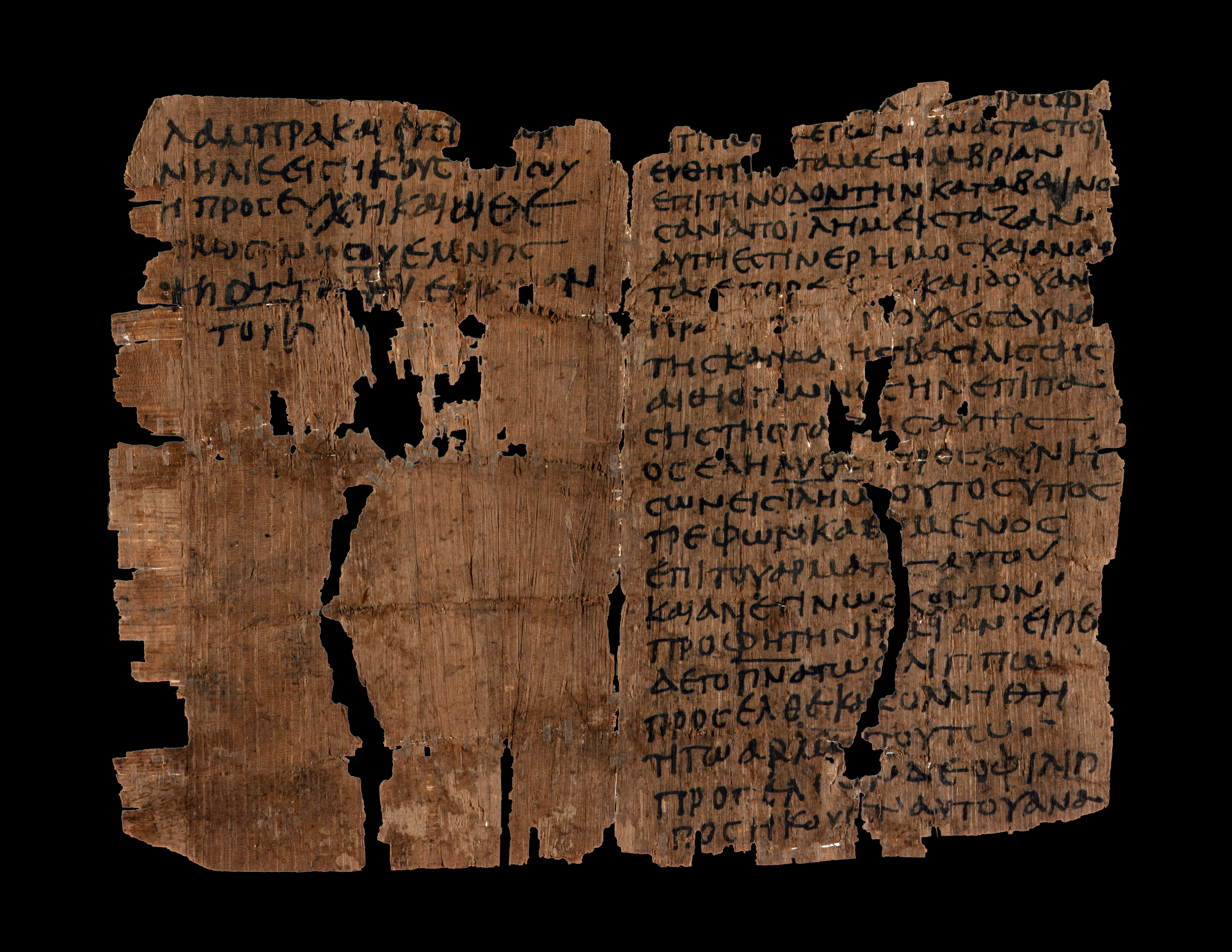
Verso Acts 8:6-30, 10:31

The Greek text of this codex is mixed. It has some orthographical peculiarities and corrections. Aland placed it in Category III. The text generally concurs with Codex Sinaiticus and Vaticanus.

The nomina sacra are contracted (Ι̅Λ̅Η̅Μ̅, Π̅Ν̅Α̅, Α̅Ν̅Ο̅Σ̅, Α̅Ν̅Ο̅Ν̅, Θ̅Σ̅, Θ̅Υ̅, Κ̅Υ̅).

The manuscript was purchased in Paris by Yale University in 1933 along with other manuscripts of Egyptian provenance. The text of the codex was published in 1937 by Carl H. Kraeling.

It is currently housed at the Beinecke Rare Book and Manuscript Library at Yale University (P.CtYBR inv. 1543) in New Haven.

== See also ==
- Acts of the Apostles: chapter 8 and 10
- List of New Testament papyri
