= Peter's vision of a sheet with animals =

Incident in the Book of Acts

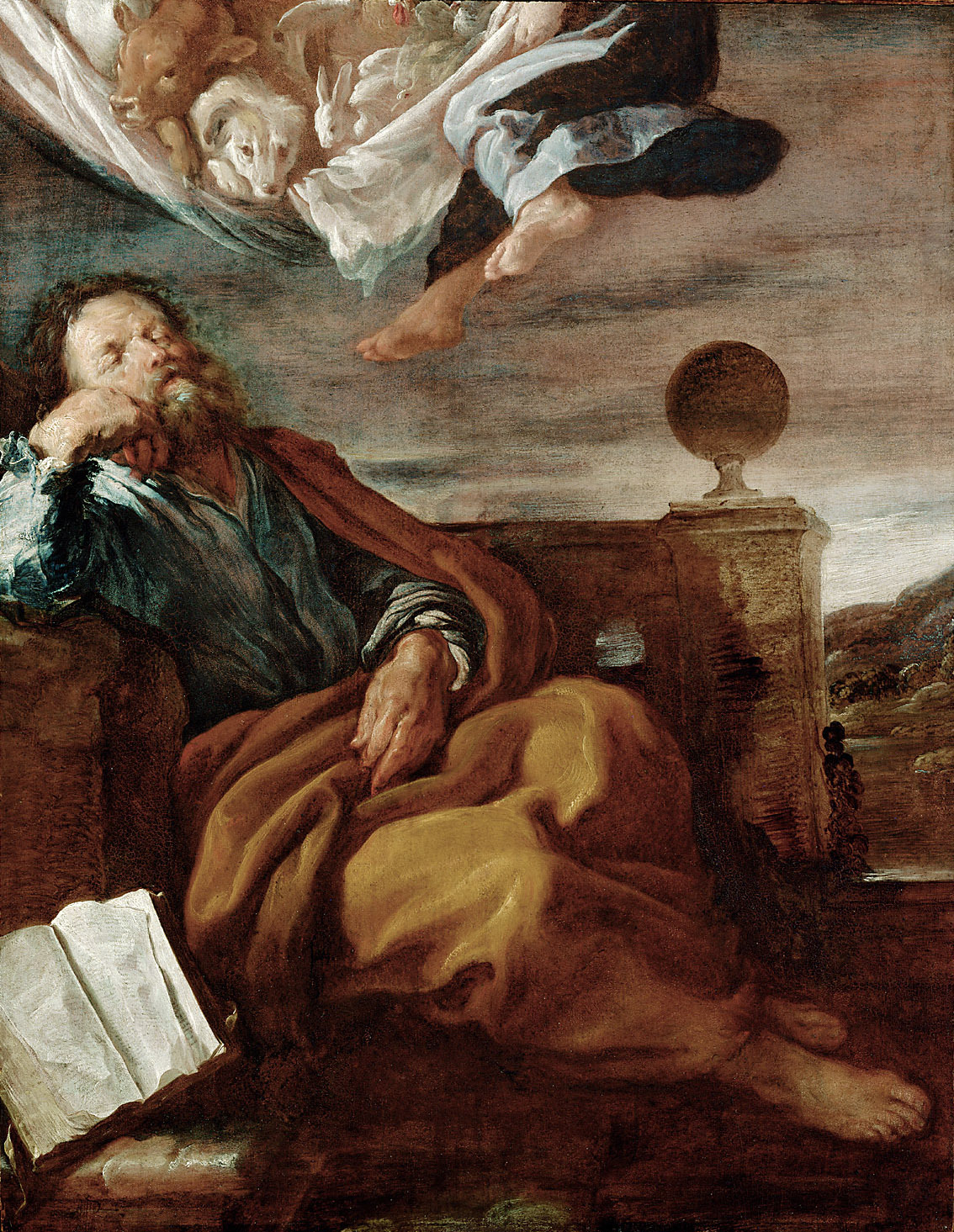
Peter's vision of a sheet with animals, the vision painted by Domenico Fetti (1619)

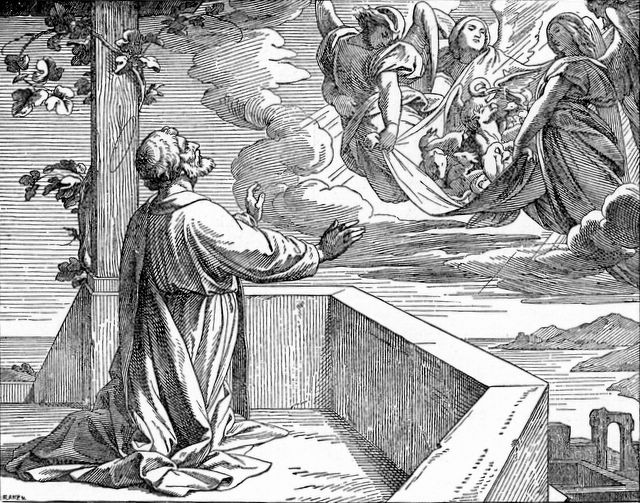
Illustration from Treasures of the Bible by Henry Davenport Northrop, 1894

According to the Acts of the Apostles, chapter 10, Saint Peter had a vision of a vessel (Greek: σκεῦος, skeuos; "a certain vessel descending upon him, as it had been a great sheet knit at the four corners") full of animals being lowered from heaven (Acts 10:11). A voice from heaven told Peter to kill and eat, but since the vessel (or sheet, ὀθόνη, othonē) contained unclean animals, Peter declined. The command was repeated two more times, along with the voice saying, "What God hath made clean, that call not thou common" (verse 15) and then the vessel was taken back to heaven (verse 16).

At this point in the narrative, messengers sent from Cornelius the Centurion arrive and urge Peter to go with them. He does so, and mentions the vision as he speaks to Cornelius, saying "God hath shewed me that I should not call any man common or unclean" (Acts 10:28). Peter related the vision again in Acts 11:4–9.

== Interpretation ==
Simon J. Kistemaker suggests that the lesson God taught Peter in this vision is that "God has removed the barriers he once erected to separate his people from the surrounding nations." Kistemaker argues that it means Peter has to accept Gentile believers as full members of the Christian Church, but also that God has made all animals clean, so that "Peter with his fellow Jewish Christians can disregard the food laws that have been observed since the days of Moses." Albert Mohler, President of Southern Seminary, writes:

As the Book of Acts makes clear, Christians are not obligated to follow this holiness code. This is made clear in Peter's vision in Acts 10:15. Peter is told, 'What God has made clean, do not call common.' In other words, there is no kosher code for Christians. Christians are not concerned with eating kosher foods and avoiding all others. That part of the law is no longer binding, and Christians can enjoy shrimp and pork with no injury to conscience.

Luke Timothy Johnson and Daniel J. Harrington write that this episode heralds a radical change in Peter's "identity as a member of God's people," but also that "the implication is that all things God created are declared clean by him, and are not affected by human discriminations."

On the other hand, both the Seventh-day Adventist Church and the United Church of God (UCG) argue that Peter's statement in verse 28 indicates that the divine disclosure reflected only a teaching about people, and not one about food. The United Church of God argues that this is an "often-misunderstood section of the Bible", and that "the puzzling vision could not be annulling God's instructions." As such, Adventists and followers of the UCG traditionally observe the Old Testament dietary restrictions, which, like the still upheld Jewish dietary laws, forbid the consumption of pork, shellfish (including shrimps and lobsters), any carnivores, any herbivores that are not ruminants, and any ruminants that do not have split hooves, among others.

Peter's triple refusal described in Acts 10:16 echoes the denial of Peter described in the Synoptic Gospels.

== Artistic depictions ==
Peter's vision was rarely shown in art, but has been illustrated with pen-and-ink drawings by Rembrandt and a variant by his pupil van Hoogstraten. Rembrandt was probably reacting to a painting of the subject by Domenico Fetti which was then in Amsterdam, and is now in Vienna. It also appears in the "Altar of St. Peter" in Seville Cathedral, attributed to Francisco de Zurbarán.
