= Simon the Tanner (New Testament) =

Figure in the New Testament

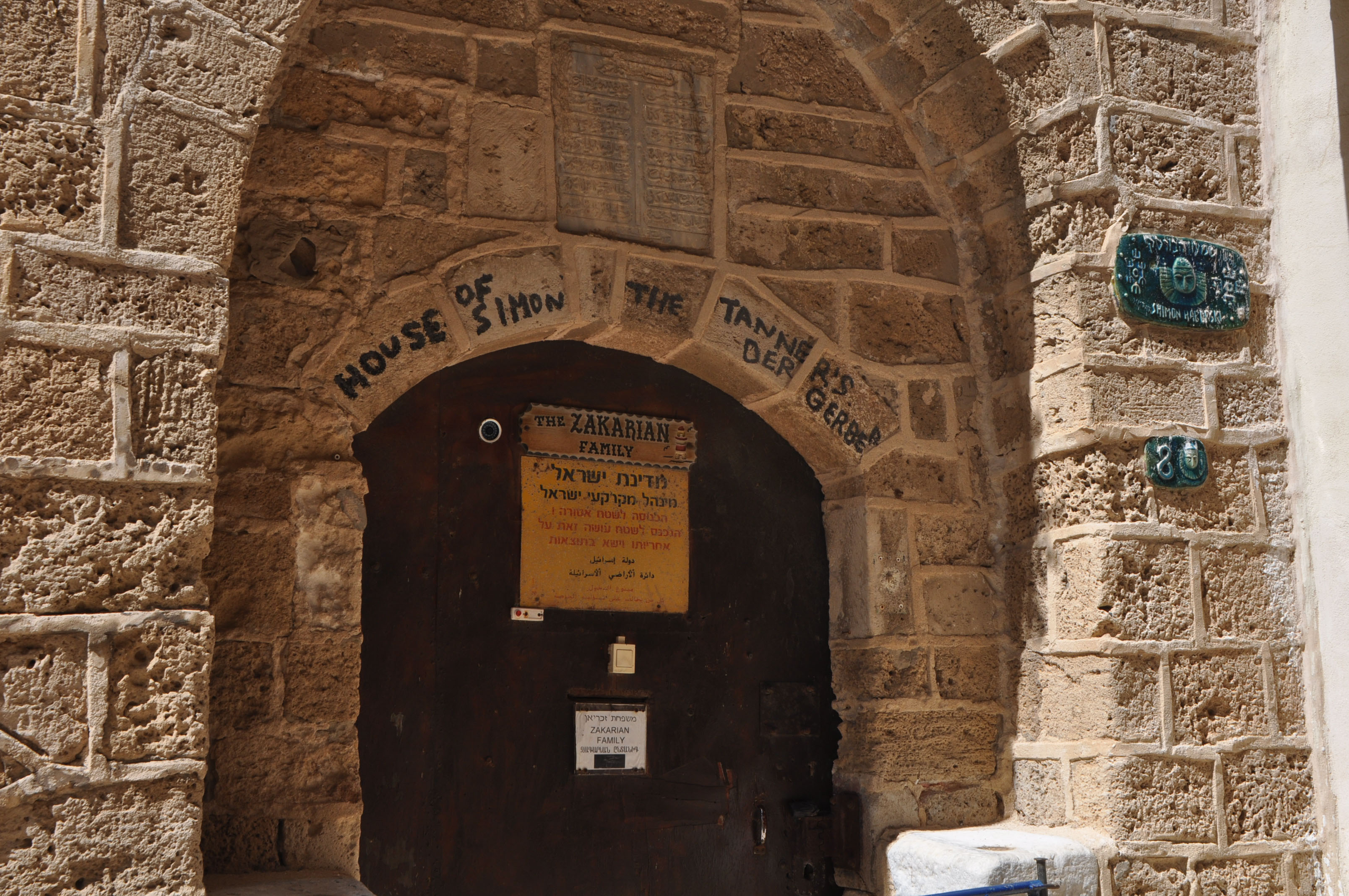
The entrance to Simon the Tanner's house in Joppa (Jaffa)

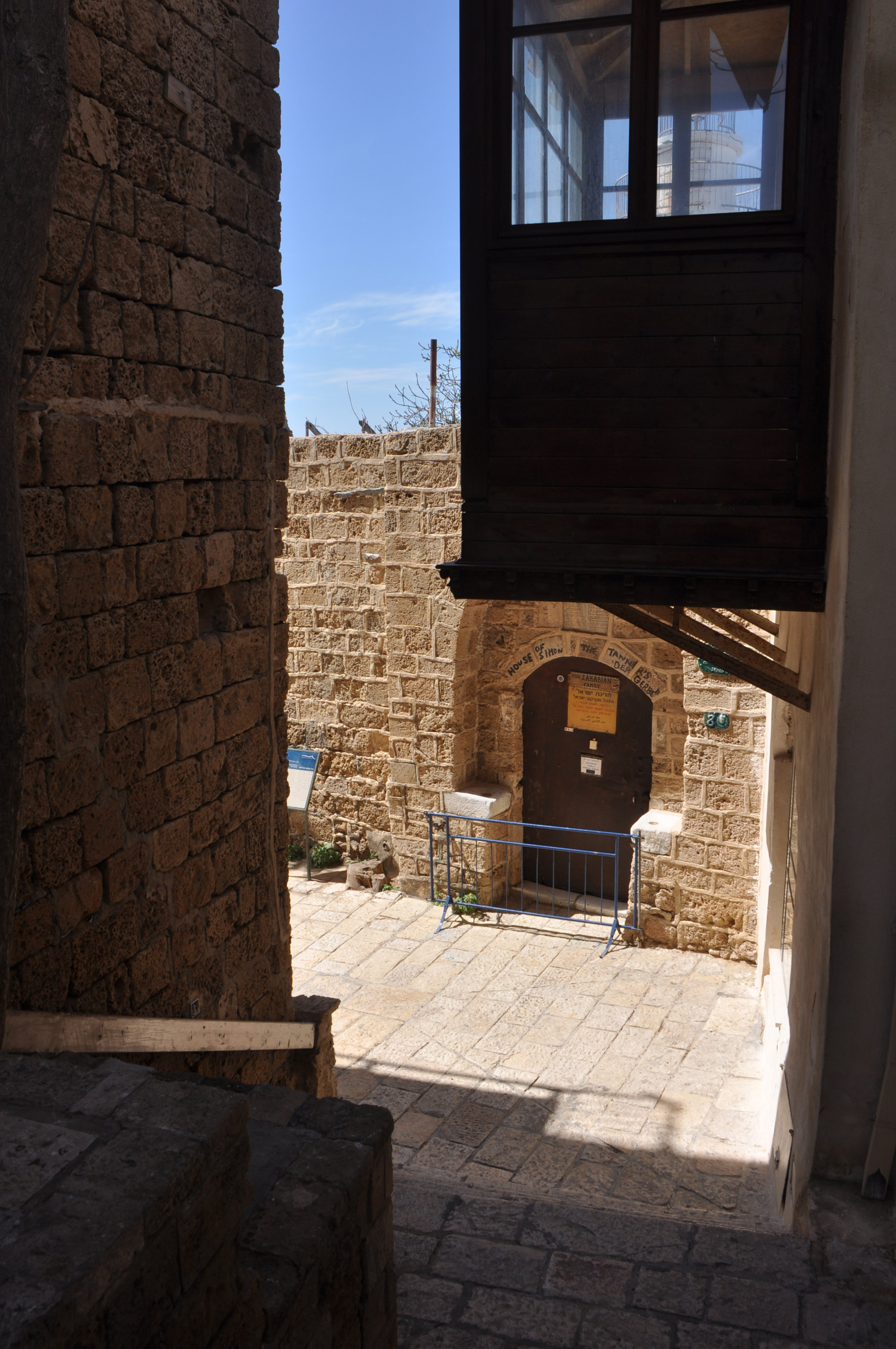
The same entrance from further away

Simon the Tanner, who appears in the Acts of the Apostles book of the New Testament, had a house in Jaffa, where Saint Peter stayed during his missionary activities of the early Christian faith. He is believed to be an example of the early Christians embracing people of all professions. The events at his house are interpreted as leading to the early followers of Jesus opening up their ranks also to the Gentiles, after starting as a Jewish movement. The traditional site of Simon's house is in the Old City of Jaffa, now part of the Tel Aviv-Yafo municipality in Israel.

== Acts of the Apostles ==
Simon the Tanner is mentioned three times in Chapters 9 and 10 of Acts of the Apostles of the New Testament.

Firstly, Acts 9 records Paul's conversion and then recounts Peter's missionary activities. Peter visited Jaffa and raised Tabitha from dead. This account observes that "Peter stayed some time in Joppa with a certain tanner named Simon".

Secondly, in Acts 10:1, Cornelius, a centurion of the Roman army who was stationed at Caesarea, was told by the angel:

"Send messengers to Joppa at once and summon a certain Simon, the one known as Peter. He is a guest of Simon the tanner, whose house is near the seacoast." (Acts 10:5–6)

Thirdly, at the same time as Cornelius had a vision in Caesarea, Peter also had a vision that he must eat the flesh of clean as well as unclean animals, which he eventually interpreted as having to preach to Jews as well as to the Gentiles. Peter then visited Caesarea to meet Cornelius, saw the Holy Spirit descend upon him, and baptised him. When Peter asked the centurion why he had called for Peter, he answered:

"He [the angel] said [in a vision], 'Cornelius, God has heard your prayers, and your compassionate acts are like a memorial offering to him. Therefore, send someone to Joppa and summon Simon, who is known as Peter. He is a guest in the house of Simon the tanner, located in the seacoast.'" (Acts 10:31–32)

Jesus took Matthew, a tax collector by profession, as one of his twelve disciples. Tax collectors were disdained by the Jews in general, because they served the Roman Empire, not their God.

The tanners' profession was equally disdained by the People of Israel because they dealt with dead animals and urine. Luke's account of Acts, mentioning Simon the Tanner, shows that Peter, who was playing the central role of early Christian missionary activities, embraced people of all professions, and eventually also Gentiles.

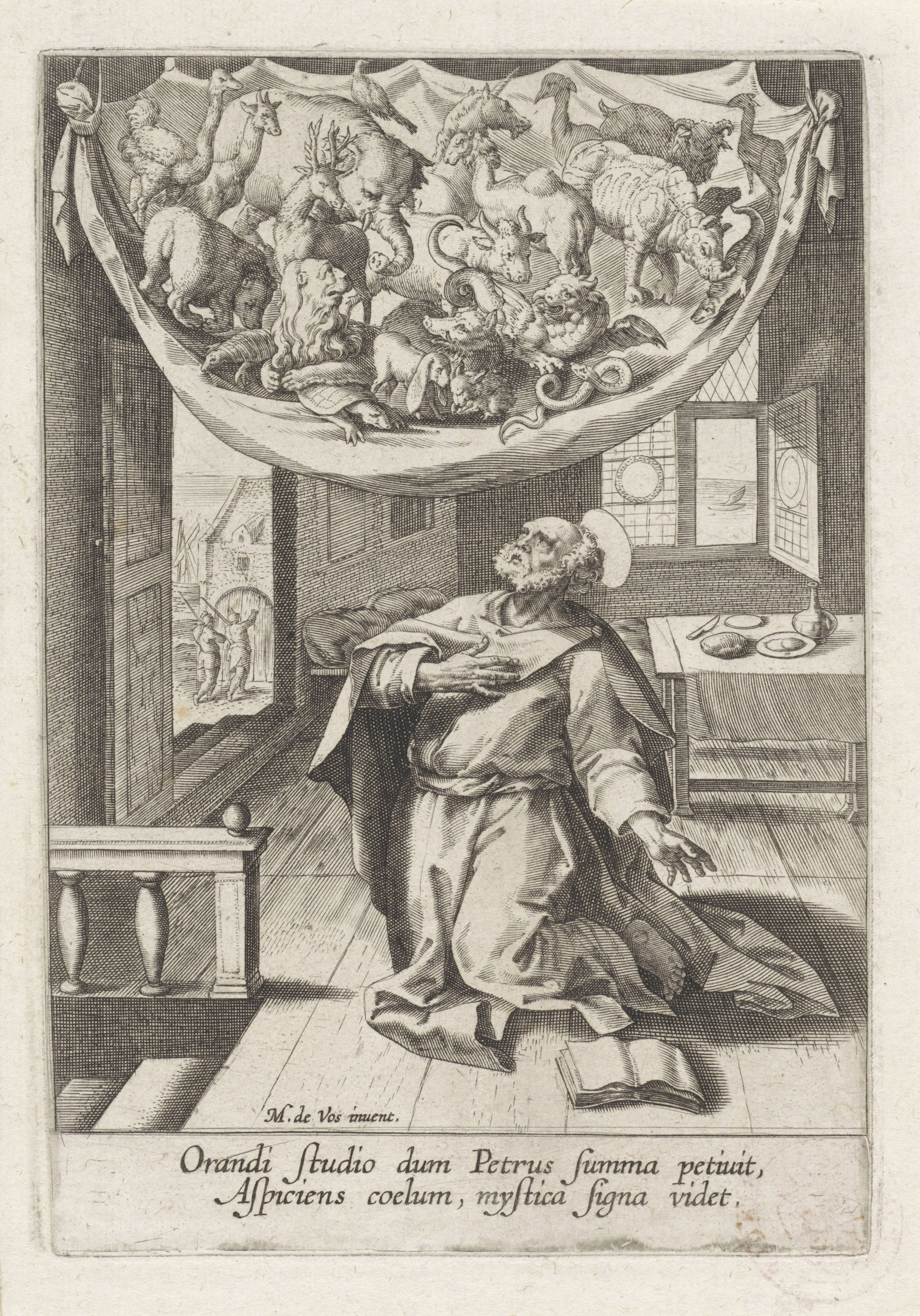
Saint Peter's vision about the unclean animals, Engraving, ca 1591–1600

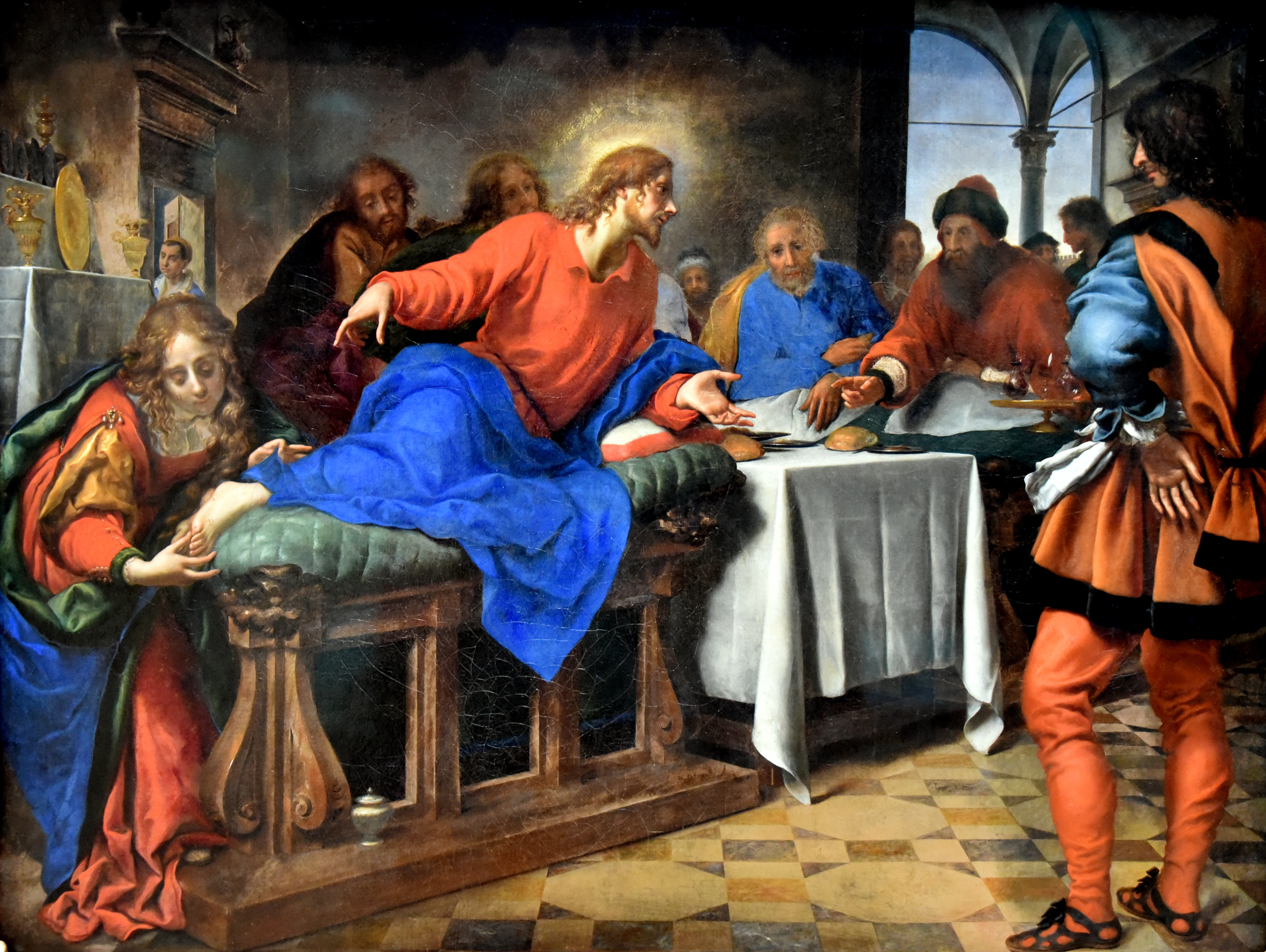
Christ and Mary Magdalene in the House of Simon, 1645, by Carlo Dolci (1616–1686). Nationalmuseum, Stockholm, Sweden

== Location in Tel Aviv-Yafo ==
Jaffa where Peter stayed is now part of Israel's largest city, Tel Aviv-Yafo. In the Old City of Jaffa, there is the traditional house of Simon the Tanner. The house is privately owned and cannot be visited, but its entrance door and location attracts many Christian pilgrims and tourists.

== See also ==
- Acts of the Apostles
