= Uncial 0244 =

- New Testament manuscript
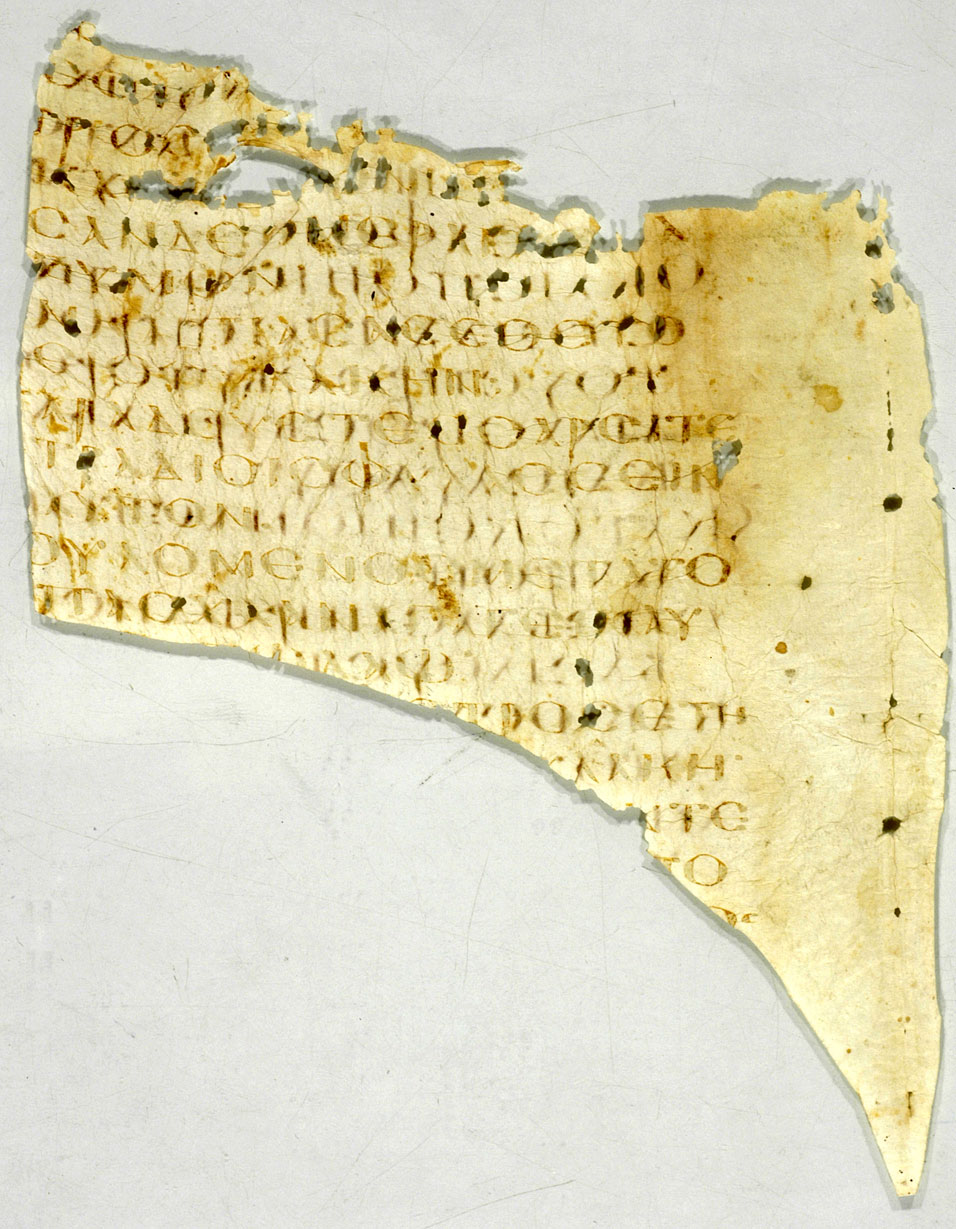
- Side verso with the text of Acts 12:3–5
- Text: Acts 11:29-12:5
- Date: 5th century
- Script: Greek
- Now at: Université catholique de Louvain
- Size: 18 cm by 14 cm
- Type: Alexandrian text-type
- Category: II

Uncial 0244 (in the Gregory-Aland numbering), is a Greek uncial manuscript of the New Testament. Paleographically it has been assigned to the fifth century.

== Description ==
Currently it is dated by the INTF to the 5th century.

The codex contains a small part of the Acts of the Apostles 11:29-12:5, on 1 parchment leaf (18 cm by 14 cm). It is written in two columns per page, 18 lines per page, in uncial letters.

The manuscript was added to the list of the New Testament manuscripts by Kurt Aland in 1963.

== Text ==
The Greek text of this codex is a representative of the Alexandrian text-type. Aland placed it in Category II.

== Location ==
Currently the codex is housed at the Université catholique de Louvain (P. A. M. Khirbet Mird 8) in Louvain-la-Neuve.

== See also ==
- List of New Testament uncials
- Textual criticism
