= Daniel J. Harrington =

American theologian and New Testament scholar (1940–2014)

Daniel J. Harrington, S.J. (July 19, 1940 – February 7, 2014), was an American academic and Jesuit priest who served as professor of New Testament and chair of the Biblical Studies department at Boston College School of Theology and Ministry (formerly Weston Jesuit School of Theology).

Harrington served as editor of New Testament Abstracts from 1972 until his death. He also edited the eighteen-volume Sacra Pagina series of New Testament commentaries for Liturgical Press and wrote "The Word" column for America magazine for three years. He was a teacher as well as a theologian and his areas of study included the interpretation of the Bible in antiquity and today, Second Temple Judaism, the Dead Sea Scrolls, biblical theology, biblical languages, the Synoptic Gospel, Pauline theology, and the book of Revelation.

He was a pastoral associate at St. Agnes in Arlington, Massachusetts, and at St. Peter's in Cambridge, Massachusetts. America magazine called him "one of the world's leading New Testament scholars".

Harrington died of cancer in the New England Jesuit Infirmary in Weston, Massachusetts.

== Education ==
A 1958 graduate of Boston College High School, Harrington went on to get a BA in classics and philosophy in 1964 and a MA in philosophy in 1965 from Weston College (now part of Boston College). He earned a Ph.D. in Near Eastern Languages from Harvard University in 1970. He also earned an M.Div. from Weston Jesuit School of Theology.

== Pauline theology ==
Harrington has written two books on the Apostle Paul: Paul and Virtue Ethics and Meeting St. Paul Today. Meeting St. Paul Today, written during the Pauline Year proclaimed by Pope Benedict XVI in 2008, is a short book that aims to introduce Paul and his writings to the general public. It also aims to show that Paul's practical and pastoral advice to the early Christian community is still applicable today.

Fr. Harrington uncovers who Paul was and what we can learn from him today. He discusses Paul as a pastoral theologian and one who collaborated with others to succeed in his ministry. Harrington considers how Scripture can impact contemporary readers, particularly the letters of Paul. He discusses the authorship of Paul and ascribes to the traditional account that there are six letters that are disputed (meaning many scholars believe that Paul did not write them) and there are seven that are undisputed. He argues 2 Thessalonians, Colossians, Ephesians, 1 Timothy, 2 Timothy, and Titus are the six disputed letters while 1 Thessalonians, Galatians, Philippians, Philemon, 1 Corinthians, 2 Corinthians, and Romans are the seven undisputed letters. While he does note that it is important to recognize that there are six letters that were most likely not written by Paul, he argues they should not be disregarded because “of course, both groups of letters are part of Sacred Scripture for Christians.” Harrington discusses each letter in detail providing insights into how Paul is applicable to contemporary lives. He presents some helpful tools through literary, historical, and theological approaches and discusses the differences in translations and how it can be helpful to examine multiple translations to understand more fully the complexity of translations and the differences in meaning.

Harrington also discusses the importance of the “actualization” of the Pauline letters. He says this term “describes the process of reading ancient texts in new circumstances and applying them to the current situation of the people of God.” He describes that this was an ancient practice that many Jewish communities participated in. He discusses the importance of the prayer practice, lectio divina, when reading Paul. Actualization and lectio divina can foster the growth of the Pauline texts and can allow God to work through the texts and bring out contemporary insights in ways that historical criticism or literary criticism cannot. Harrington argues that there are many specific elements that we can learn from Paul and use to assist us as Christians today. He says, “We can learn to recognize the prominence of women in Paul’s mission and ministry, and the high value that Paul placed on collaborative ministry.”

== Publications ==
Harrington wrote more than 40 books, including:

- Following Jesus: What the New Testament Teaches Us. Huntington, Indiana: Our Sunday Visitor. (2012); ISBN 978-1-59276-159-3
- Witnesses to the Word: New Testament Studies since Vatican II. New York: Paulist Press. (2012); ISBN 978-0-8091-4820-2
- First and Second Maccabees. Collegeville, Minnesota: Liturgical Press (2012); ISBN 978-0-8146-2846-1
- The Bible and the Believer: Reading the Bible Critically and Religiously, with M. Brettler and P. Enns. New York: Oxford University Press. (2012); ISBN 978-0-19-986300-6
- Historical Dictionary of Jesus. Lanham, Maryland: Scarecrow Press. (2010); ISBN 978-0-8108-7667-5
- Interpreting the Old Testament. Collegeville, Minnesota: Liturgical Press (1981/1991); ISBN 978-0-8146-5236-7
- Jesus the Revelation of the Father’s Love. Huntington, Indiana: Our Sunday Visitor. (2010); ISBN 978-1-59276-758-8
- Meeting St. Matthew Today. Chicago: Loyola Press. (2010); ISBN 978-0-8294-2914-5
- Paul and Virtue Ethics, with James F. Keenan, S.J. Lanham, Maryland: Rowman & Littlefield. (2010); ISBN 978-0-7425-9959-8
- Meeting St. Luke Today. Chicago: Loyola Press. (2009)
- The Synoptic Gospels Set Free: Preaching without Anti-Judaism. New York: Paulist Press. (2009)
- Jesus and Prayer: What the New Testament Teaches Us. Ijamsville, Maryland: Word-Among-Us Press. (2009)
- The Gospel of Matthew (Sacra Pagina series). Collegeville, Minnesota: Liturgical Press. (2007) ISBN 978-0814659649
- Why Do We Suffer? A Scriptural Approach to the Human Condition. Franklin, Wisconsin: Sheed & Ward. (2000)
- The Church According to the New Testament. Franklin, Wisconsin: Sheed & Ward, (2001)
- The Gospel of Mark, with John Donahue. Collegeville, Minnesota: Liturgical Press. (2002)
- Jesus and Virtue Ethics, with James F. Keenan, S.J. Chicago: Sheed & Ward. (2002)
- 1 Peter, Jude, and 2 Peter, with Donald Senior. Collegeville, Minnesota: Liturgical Press. (2003)
- What Are They Saying About Mark?. New York: Paulist Press. (2004)
- What Are They Saying About the Letter to the Hebrews?. New York: Paulist Press. (2005)
- Jesus Ben Sira of Jerusalem: A Biblical Guide to Living Wisely. Collegeville, Minnesota: Liturgical Press. (2005)
- How Do Catholics Read the Bible?. Lanham, Maryland: Sheed & Ward/Rowman & Littlefield. (2005)
- The Letter to the Hebrews. Collegeville, Minnesota: Liturgical Press. (2006)
- What Are We Hoping For? New Testament Images. Collegeville, Minnesota: Liturgical Press. (2006)
- Jesus: A Historical Portrait. Cincinnati: St. Anthony Messenger Press. (2007); ISBN 978-0-8671-6833-4
- Why Do We Hope? Images in the Psalms. Collegeville, Minnesota: Liturgical Press. (2008)
- Meeting St. Paul Today. Chicago: Loyola Press. (2008)
