= León palimpsest =

7th-century Latin Bible manuscript

The León Palimpsest, designated l or 67 (in the Beuron system), is a 7th-century Latin manuscript pandect of the Christian Bible conserved in the cathedral of León, Spain. The text, written on vellum, is in a fragmentary condition. In some parts it represents the Old Latin version, while following Jerome's Vulgate in others. The codex is a palimpsest.

From its location in Léon, this palimpsest is sometimes referred to as the Codex Legionensis; but this name is more commonly applied to the 10th-century Vulgate Bible at the Basilica of San Isidoro, León (Codex Gothicus Legionensis, or 91, 92 and 133 in the Beuron system). Nor should the León palimpsest be confused with another 10th-century pandect in León, of which the second volume is conserved in the cathedral archive of Léon (number 193 in the Beuron system).

== Description ==
The text of the New Testament has survived on 40 leaves of the codex. The leaves have measures 37 by 24 cm. The text is written in 2 columns of 38-55 lines per page. The text is written in a semi-uncial hand, in Visigothic characters. The fragments contain texts of James 4:4 - 1 Peter 3:14; 1 John 1:5 - 3 John 10; Acts 7:27–11:13; 14:21–17:25. It contains also a fragment of the Books of Maccabees. The text of the codex represent a Vulgate with Old Latin elements, especially in the First Epistle of John. The text is close to the Liber Comicus. The codex also contains the text of the Comma Johanneum (1 John 5:7). As it is a palimpsest, the text could be overwritten. The younger upper text contains a 10th-century writing of Rufinus' translation of Eusebius' Church history. The whole book contains 275 leaves, of which 185 have had their underwiting deciphered.

The order of the books may tentatively be reconstructed: Octateuch, 1–4 Kings, Prophets (without Baruch), Job, Psalms (iuxta Hebraeos?), Proverbs, Ecclesiastes, Song of Songs, Chronicles (Paralipomenon), 1–2 Ezra, 4 Esdras, Wisdom, Ecclesiasticus (Sirach), Esther, Judith, Tobit, 1–2 Maccabees; Gospels, Pauline Epistles, Catholic Epistles, Acts, Apocalypse.

== History ==
The biblical underwriting has been dated by F. H. A. Scrivener, Samuel Berger, and Bruce M. Metzger to the 7th century.

It was discovered by Rudolf Beer. It was examined and described by Samuel Berger. It was examined by Bonifatius Fischer and Thiele. Fischer edited its text in 1963.

Currently it is housed in the archive of León Cathedral, where it is designated as codex 15. The manuscript is cited in several critical texts of the Greek and Latin New Testament.

== See also ==
- List of New Testament Latin manuscripts
- Codex Toletanus
