= Papyrus 127 =

- New Testament manuscript
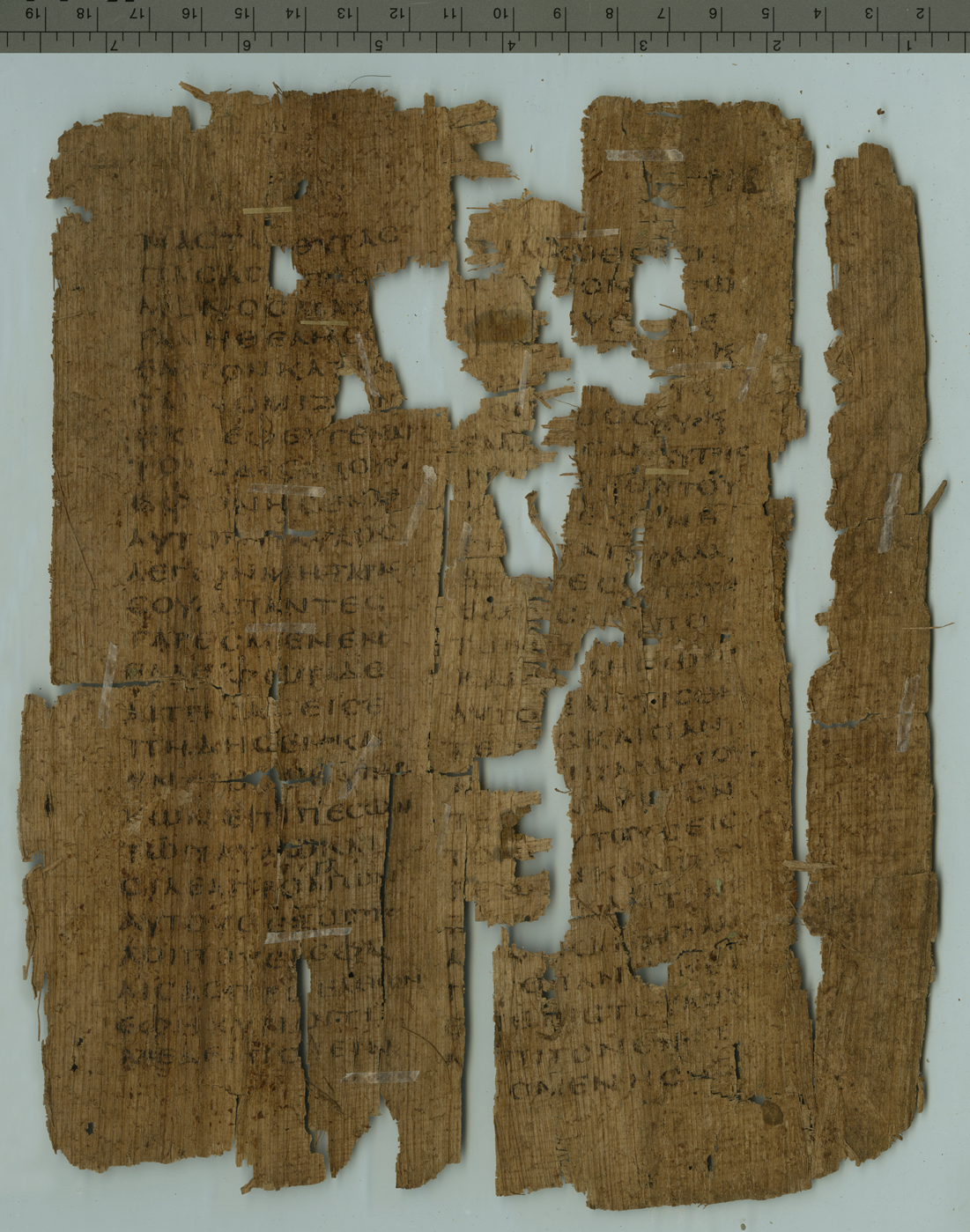
- Name: P. Oxy. 4968
- Sign: 𝔓^{127}
- Text: Acts of the Apostles 10-12, 15-17
- Date: 5th century
- Script: Greek
- Now at: Sackler Library
- Size: 16.5 cm by 21.5 cm
- Type: ?
- Category: none
- Note: It contains Acts 15:34

Papyrus 127 (in the Gregory-Aland numbering), designated by 𝔓^{127}, is a copy of a small part of the New Testament in Greek. It is a papyrus manuscript of the Acts of the Apostles.

== Description ==
The surviving texts of Acts are verses 10:32-35, 40–45; 11:2-5, 30; 12:1-3, 5, 7–9; 15:29-31, 34–36, (37), 38–41; 16:1-4, 13–40; 17:1-10, they are in a fragmentary condition. The manuscript palaeographically has been assigned to the 5th century (INTF). Written in two columns per page, between 22 and 26 lines per page (originally).

== See also ==
- List of New Testament papyri
- Oxyrhynchus Papyri
- Biblical manuscript

== Sources ==
- D.C. Parker, S.R. Pickering, The Oxyrhynchus Papyri LXXIV, London 2009, 1-45, Pl. II-V
