= Areopagus sermon =

Sermon delivered by Paul the Apostle in Athens

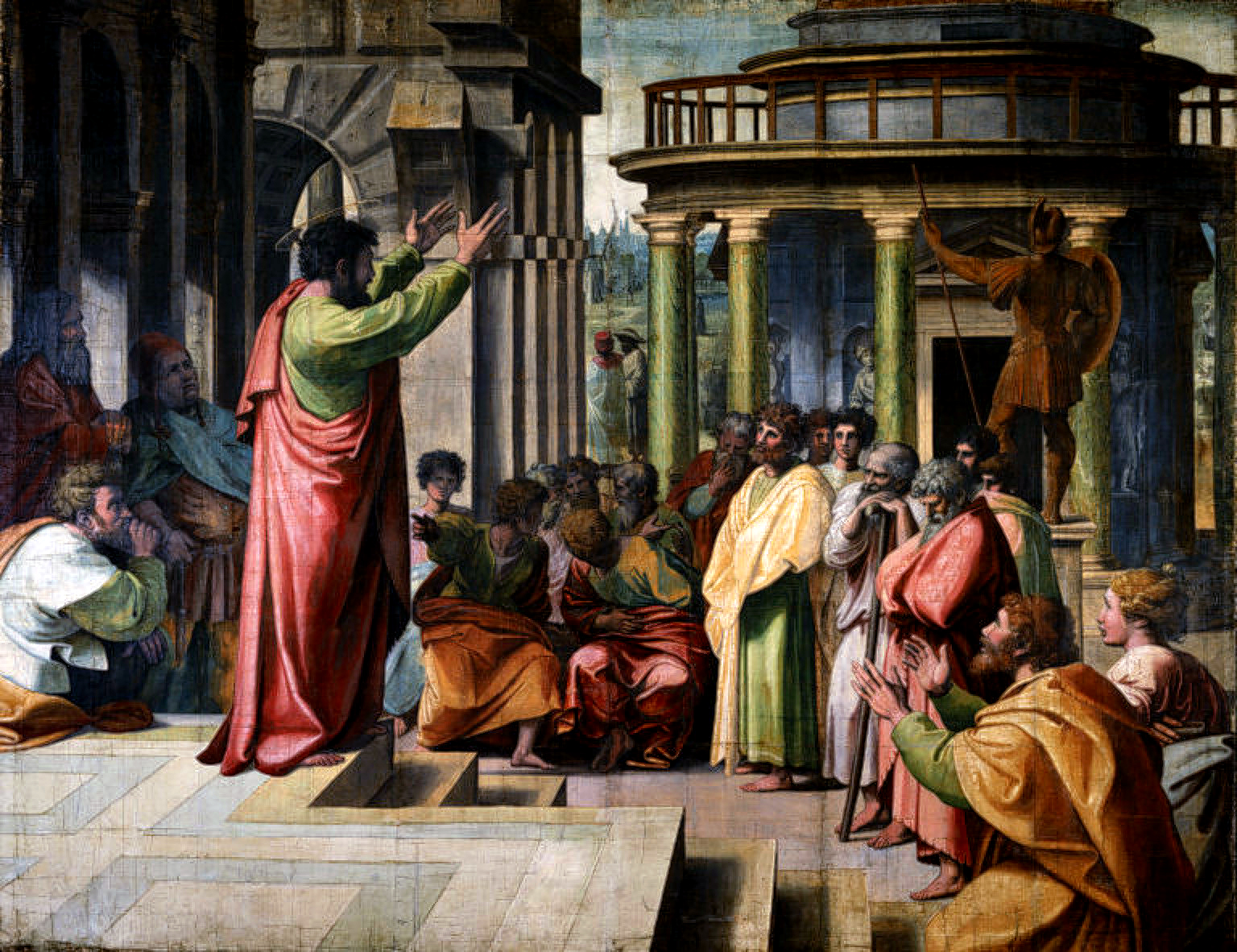
Saint Paul delivering the Areopagus Sermon in Athens, by Raphael, 1515.

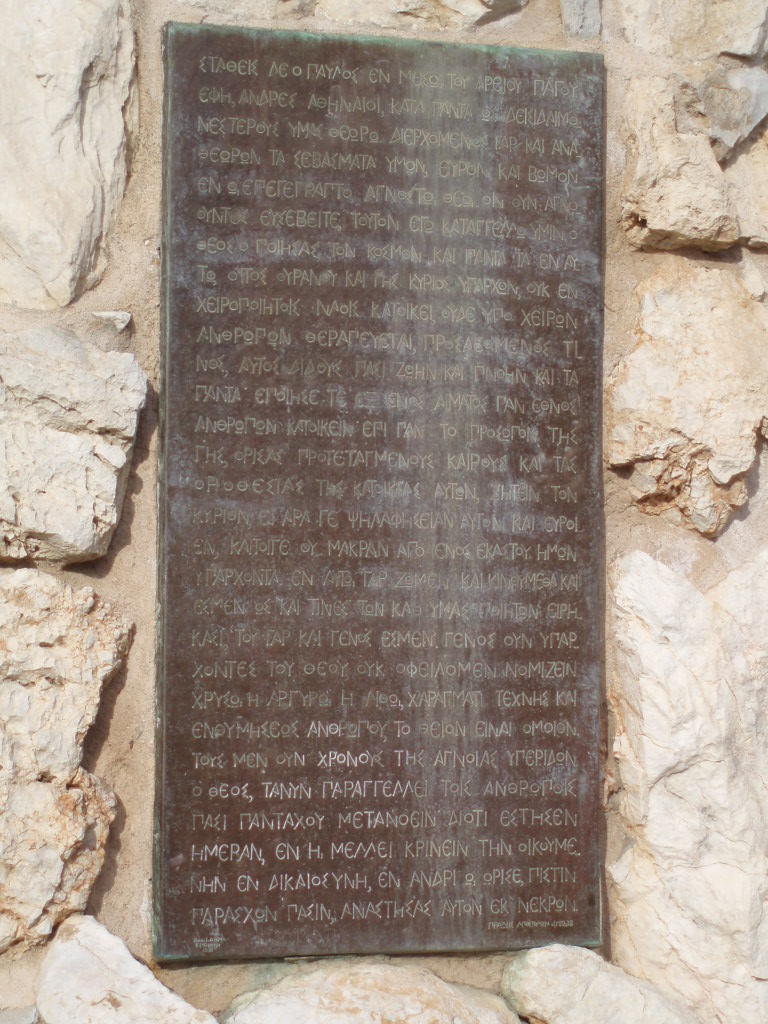
Engraved plaque containing Apostle Paul's sermon, at the Areopagus, Athens, Greece.

The Areopagus sermon refers to a sermon delivered by the Apostle Paul in Athens, at the Areopagus, and recounted in Acts 17:16–34. The Areopagus sermon is the most dramatic and most fully-reported speech of the missionary career of Saint Paul and followed a shorter address in Lystra recorded in Acts 14:15–17.

== History ==
Paul had encountered conflict as a result of his preaching in Thessalonica and Berea in northern Greece and had been carried to Athens as a place of safety. According to the Acts of the Apostles, while he was waiting for his companions Silas and Timothy to arrive, Paul was distressed to see Athens full of idols. Commentator John Gill remarked:

his soul was troubled and his heart was grieved, …he was exasperated and provoked to the last degree: he was in a paroxysm; his heart was hot within him; he had a burning fire in his bones, and was weary with forbearing, and could not stay; his zeal wanted vent, and he gave it.

So Paul went to the synagogue and the Agora (Greek: ἐν τῇ ἀγορᾷ, "in the marketplace") on a number of occasions ('daily'), to preach about the Resurrection of Jesus.

His novel expositions were met with confusion and wonder by some Epicureans and Stoics, as well as other Greeks of philosophical inclinations. They then took him to a meeting at the Areopagus, the high court in Athens, to explain himself. The Areopagus literally meant the rock of Ares in the city and was a center of temples, cultural facilities, and a high court. It is conjectured by Robert Paul Seesengood that it may have been illegal to preach a foreign deity in Athens, which would have thereby made Paul's sermon a combination of a "guest lecture" and a trial.

The sermon addresses five main issues:

- Introduction: Discussion of the ignorance of pagan worship (verses 23–24)
- The one Creator God being the object of worship (25–26)
- God's relationship to humanity (26–27)
- Idols of gold, silver and stone as objects of false worship (28–29)
- Conclusion: Time to end the ignorance (30–31)

This sermon illustrates the beginnings of the attempts to explain the nature of Christ and an early step on the path that led to the development of Christology.

Paul begins his address by emphasizing the need to know God, rather than worshiping the unknown:

"As I walked around and looked carefully at your objects of worship, I even found an altar with this inscription: TO AN UNKNOWN GOD. So you are ignorant of the very thing you worship — and this is what I am going to proclaim to you."

=== Zeus and Christ ===
In his sermon, Paul quotes from certain Greek philosophers and poets, namely in verse 17:28. He alludes to passages from Epimenides and from either Aratus or Cleanthes.

From Aratus (a poet educated in the Stoic philosophy) he borrowed his poem Phaenomena 5 and compared it with Acts 17:28, stating that indeed humans are the offspring of Zeus (the Creator according to the Stoics and other philosophical schools) but in order for humans to know him in a personal relationship, they must first follow the teachings of his son, the Logos incarnated, Jesus Christ.

From Zeus let us begin; him do we mortals never leave unnamed; full of Zeus are all the streets and all the market-places of men; full is the sea and the havens thereof; always we all have need of Zeus. For we are also his offspring; and he in his kindness unto men giveth favourable signs and wakeneth the people to work, reminding them of livelihood. He tells what time the soil is best for the labour of the ox and for the mattock, and what time the seasons are favourable both for the planting of trees and for casting all manner of seeds. For himself it was who set the signs in heaven, and marked out the constellations, and for the year devised what stars chiefly should give to men right signs of the seasons, to the end that all things might grow unfailingly. Wherefore him do men ever worship first and last. Hail, O Father, mighty marvel, mighty blessing unto men. Hail to thee and to the Elder Race! Hail, ye Muses, right kindly, every one! But for me, too, in answer to my prayer direct all my lay, even as is meet, to tell the stars.

Paul then explained concepts such as the resurrection of the dead and salvation, in effect a prelude to the future discussions of Christology.

After the sermon a number of people became followers of Paul. These included a woman named Damaris, and Dionysius, a member of the Areopagus (not to be confused with Pseudo-Dionysius the Areopagite or Saint Denis, the first Bishop of Paris).

== See also ==
- Christology
- Evangelisation
- Open-air preaching
- Unknown God
- Agnosticism
