= Beroe =

Beroe or Beroë may refer to:

== Places and jurisdictions ==
- A city and former archbishopric of Ancient Thrace, now Stara Zagora in Bulgaria and a Latin Catholic titular see, which was founded under the name Beroe (meaning iron) and renamed to Augusta Trajana
  - Battle of Beroe, fought at Beroe in 250 between the Romans and the Goths
  - Battle of Beroia, fought at Beroe in 1122 between the Pechenegs and the Byzantine Empire
  - PFC Beroe Stara Zagora, commonly known as PFC Beroe, a football club from Stara Zagora
    - Beroe Stadium, PFC Beroe's multi-use stadium
  - BC Beroe, a basketball club from Stara Zagora
- Beroea, also called Berea, an ancient (Biblical) city in Greece, now known as Veria
  - Beroeans, the inhabitants of that city, also called Bereans
- a Roman fortified frontier post at the lower Danube, now Ostrov, Tulcea, Tulcea County, Romania
- Beroe Hill, a hill in Livingston Island, West Antarctica

== Other uses ==
- Beroe (ctenophore), a genus of the Nuda class of comb jellies (ctenophore phylum)
- Beroe (mythology), several figures from Greek mythology, including:
  - Beroe (Beirut nymph), daughter of Aphrodite and Adonis

== See also ==
- Beroea (disambiguation)
