= Unknown God =

Theory by Eduard Norden

The Unknown God or Agnostos Theos (Ancient Greek: Ἄγνωστος Θεός) is a theory by Eduard Norden first published in 1913 that proposes, based on the Christian Apostle Paul's Areopagus sermon in Acts 17:23, that in addition to the Olympian twelve and the innumerable lesser deities, ancient Greeks worshipped a deity they called "Agnostos Theos"; that is: "Unknown God", which Norden called "Un-Greek". In Athens, there was a temple specifically dedicated to that god and very often Athenians would swear "in the name of the Unknown God" (Ancient Greek: Νὴ τὸν Ἄγνωστον, romanized: Nē ton Agnōston). Apollodorus, Philostratus and Pausanias wrote about the Unknown God, as well.

== Paul at Athens ==
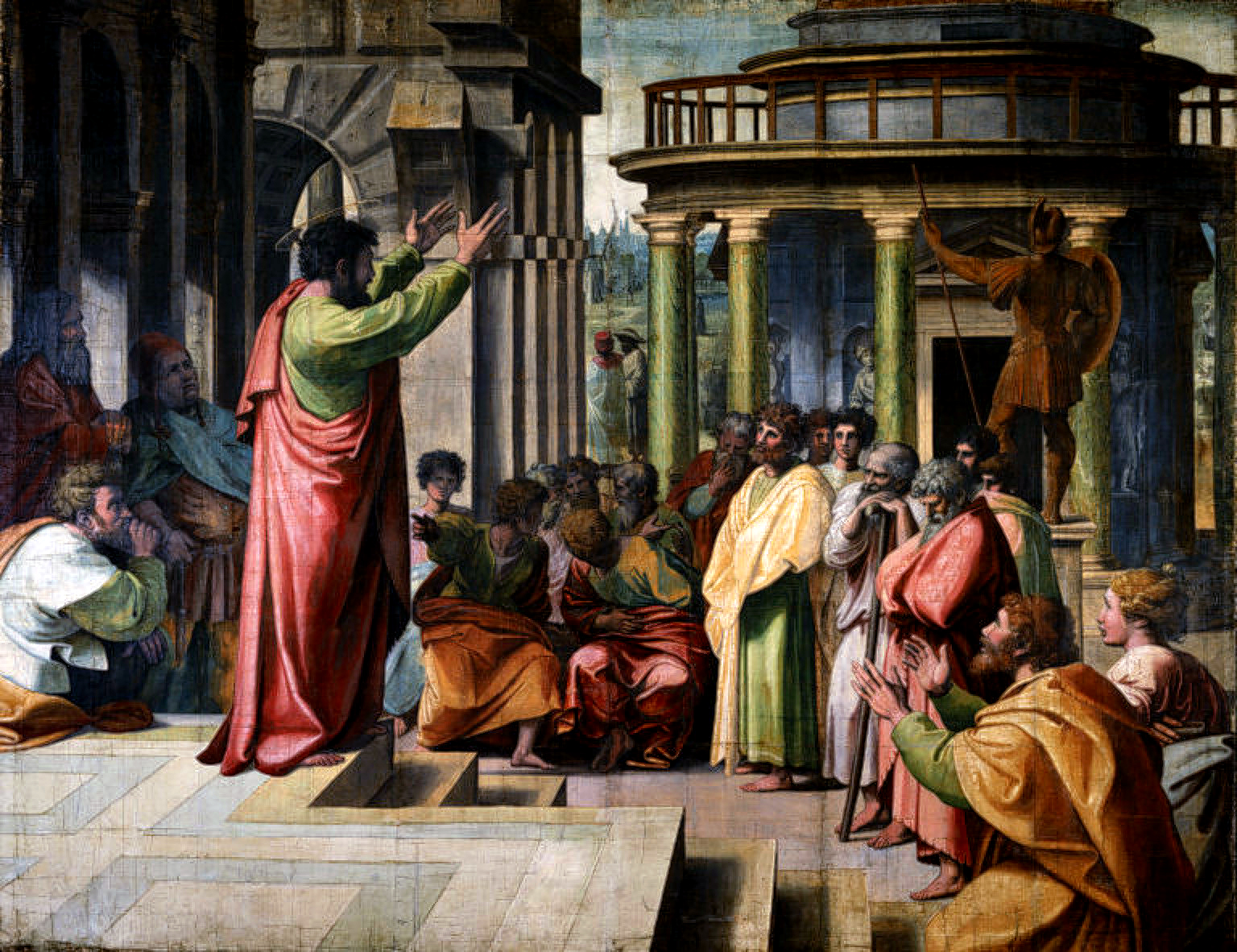
Saint Paul delivering the Areopagus Sermon in Athens, by Raphael, 1515.

According to the book of Acts, contained in the Christian New Testament, when the Apostle Paul visited Athens, he saw an altar with an inscription dedicated to that god (possibly connected to the Cylonian affair), and, when invited to speak to the Athenian elite at the Areopagus, gave the following speech:

^{22}Paul stood in the middle of the Areopagus, and said, "You men of Athens, I perceive that you are very religious in all things. ^{23}For as I passed along, and observed the objects of your worship, I found also an altar with this inscription: 'TO AN UNKNOWN GOD.' What therefore you worship in ignorance, this I announce to you. ^{24}The God who made the world and all things in it, he, being Lord of heaven and earth, doesn't dwell in temples made with hands, ^{25}neither is he served by men's hands, as though he needed anything, seeing he himself gives to all life and breath, and all things. ^{26}He made from one blood every nation of men to dwell on all the surface of the earth, having determined appointed seasons, and the boundaries of their dwellings, ^{27}that they should seek the Lord, if perhaps they might reach out for him and find him, though he is not far from each one of us. ^{28}'For in him we live, and move, and have our being.' As some of your own poets have said, 'For we are also his offspring.' ^{29}Being then the offspring of God, we ought not to think that the Divine Nature is like gold, or silver, or stone, engraved by art and design of man. ^{30}The times of ignorance therefore God overlooked. But now he commands that all people everywhere should repent, ^{31}because he has appointed a day in which he will judge the world in righteousness by the man whom he has ordained; of which he has given assurance to all men, in that he has raised him from the dead."

— Acts 17:22-31 (WEB)

Because Paul's God could not be named, according to the customs of his people, it is possible that Paul's Athenian listeners would have considered his God to be "the unknown god par excellence". His listeners may also have understood the introduction of a new god by allusions to Aeschylus' The Eumenides; the irony would have been that just as the Eumenides were not new gods at all but the Furies in a new form, so was the Christian God not a new god but rather the god the Greeks already worshipped as the Unknown God. His audience would also have recognized the quotes in verse 28 as coming from Epimenides and Aratus, respectively.

From Aratus (poet educated in the Stoic philosophy), Paul borrowed his poem Phaenomena 5 and compared it with Acts 17:28, stating that indeed humans are the offspring of Zeus (the Creator according to the Stoics and other philosophical schools) but in order for humans to know him in a personal relationship, they must first follow the teachings of his son, the Logos incarnated, Jesus Christ.

From Zeus let us begin; him do we mortals never leave unnamed; full of Zeus are all the streets and all the market-places of men; full is the sea and the havens thereof; always we all have need of Zeus. For we are also his offspring; and he in his kindness unto men giveth favourable signs and wakeneth the people to work, reminding them of livelihood. He tells what time the soil is best for the labour of the ox and for the mattock, and what time the seasons are favourable both for the planting of trees and for casting all manner of seeds. For himself it was who set the signs in heaven, and marked out the constellations, and for the year devised what stars chiefly should give to men right signs of the seasons, to the end that all things might grow unfailingly. Wherefore him do men ever worship first and last. Hail, O Father, mighty marvel, mighty blessing unto men. Hail to thee and to the Elder Race! Hail, ye Muses, right kindly, every one! But for me, too, in answer to my prayer direct all my lay, even as is meet, to tell the stars.

== Archaeology ==
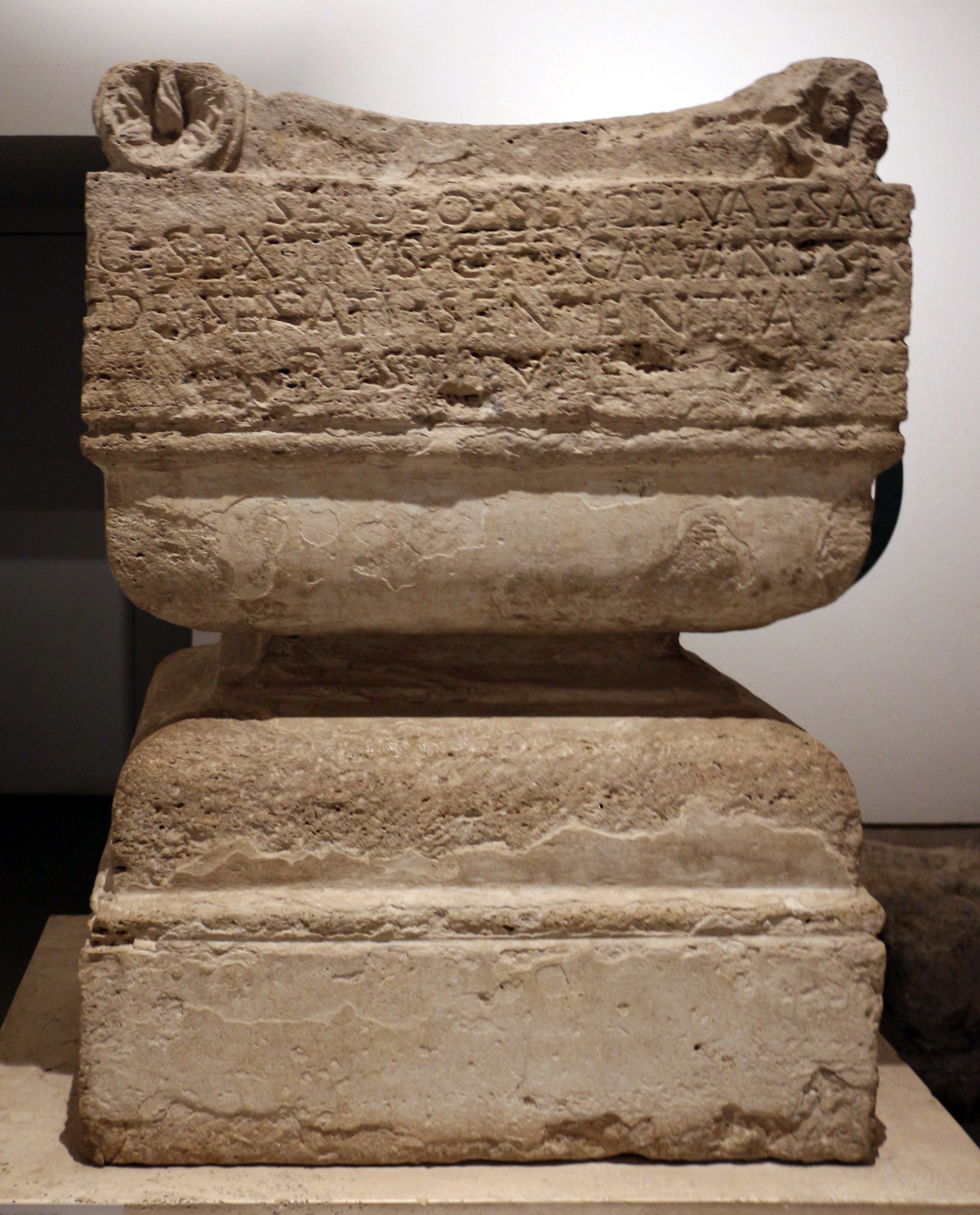
Altar to an unspecified god

There is an altar, perhaps dedicated to an unspecified god or goddess, which was unearthed in 1820 on the Palatine Hill of Rome. It contains a Latin inscription:

SEI·DEO·SEI·DEIVAE·SAC
C·SEXTIVS·C·F·CALVINVSPR
DE·SENATI·SENTENTIA
RESTITVIT

This could be translated into English as: "Whether sacred to god or to goddess, Gaius Sextius Calvinus, son of Gaius, praetor, restored this on a vote of the senate."

The altar is currently exhibited in the Palatine Museum.

== In Ancient Egypt ==
The idea of an unknown god, however, seems to predate the Greeks. For in Ancient Egypt, Amun was an unknowable god, not only in the sense of his name being unknown, but also his identity or essence.

== In Neoplatonism ==
For Plotinus, the first principle of reality is "the One", an utterly simple, ineffable, unknowable subsistence which is both the creative source of the Universe and the teleological end of all existing things.

== See also ==
- Si deus si dea
- Primum Movens
- Dii involuti
- General revelation
