= Scottish religion in the eighteenth century =

Scottish religion between 1701 and 1800

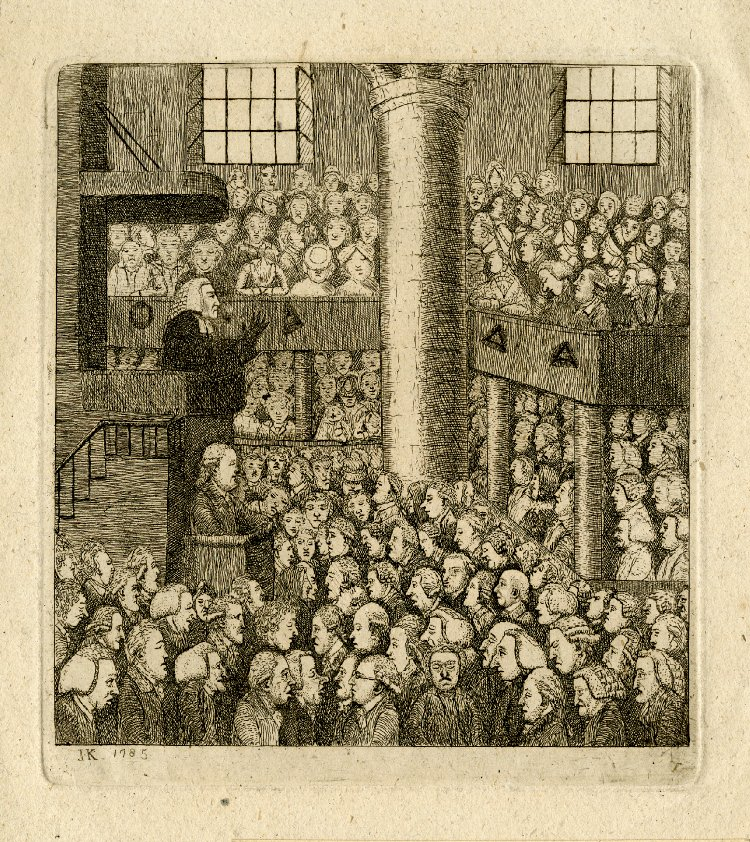
Scottish minister and his congregation, c. 1750

Scottish religion in the eighteenth century includes all forms of religious organisation and belief in Scotland in the eighteenth century. This period saw the beginnings of a fragmentation of the Church of Scotland that had been created in the Reformation and established on a fully Presbyterian basis after the Glorious Revolution. These fractures were prompted by issues of government and patronage, but reflected a wider division between the Evangelicals and the Moderate Party. The legal right of lay patrons to present clergymen of their choice to local ecclesiastical livings led to minor schisms from the church. The first in 1733, known as the First Secession and headed by figures including Ebenezer Erskine, led to the creation of a series of secessionist churches. The second in 1761 led to the foundation of the independent Relief Church.

In 1743, the Cameronians established themselves as the Reformed Presbyterian Church, remaining largely separate from religious and political debate. Of independent churches from England that were established in the seventeenth century only the Quakers managed to endure in to the eighteenth century. Baptist chapels were re-established in the middle of the century and, although Scotland initially appeared fertile ground for Methodism, it failed to expand as quickly as elsewhere in the Great Britain and Ireland. A number of minor Scottish sects developed, such as the Bereans, Buchanites, Daleites and Glassites.

Episcopalianism had retained supporters through the Wars of the Three Kingdoms and changes of regime in the seventeenth century. Since most Episcopalians gave their support to the Jacobite rebellions in the first half of the early eighteenth century, they suffered a decline in fortunes. The remoteness of the Highlands and the lack of a Gaelic-speaking clergy undermined the missionary efforts of the established church. The later eighteenth century saw some success, owing to the efforts of the SSPCK missionaries and to the disruption of traditional society. Catholicism had been reduced to the fringes of the country, particularly the Gaelic-speaking areas of the Highlands and Islands. Conditions grew worse for Catholics after the Jacobite rebellions and Catholicism was reduced to little more than a poorly run mission. There was Evangelical Revival from the 1730s, reaching its peak at the Cambuslang Wark in 1742. The movement benefited the secessionist churches who gained recruits.

The Kirk had considerable control over the lives of the people, with a major role in the Poor Law and schools and over the morals of the population. Strict Sabbatarianism was vital to Presbyterianism. The sermon was seen as central and the only participation by the congregation the singing of the psalms. Communion was the central occasion of the church, conducted infrequently, at most once a year, often taking a week of festivals as part of a communion season. In the second half of the century there were a series of reforms of church music connected to a choir movement. Episcopalians installed organs and hired musicians, following the practice in English parish churches. Catholic worship was deliberately low key, with musical accompaniment prohibited.

== Church of Scotland ==
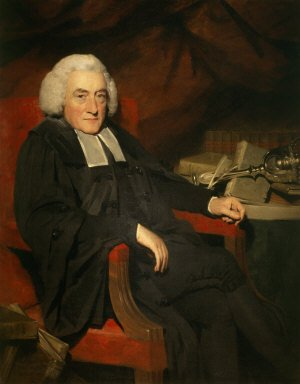
William Robertson, Principal of the University of Edinburgh and leading figure in the Moderate Party

The religious settlement after the Glorious Revolution of 1688/9 adopted the legal forms of 1592, which instituted a fully Presbyterian kirk, and doctrine based on the 1646 Westminster Confession of Faith. The early eighteenth century saw the growth of "praying societies", who supplemented the services of the established kirk with communal devotions. These often had the approval of parish ministers and their members were generally drawn from the lower ranks of local society. Their outlook varied but they disliked preaching that simply emphasised the Law or that understood the gospel as a new law neonomianism, or that was mere morality, and sought out a gospel that stressed the Grace of God in the sense set out in the Confession of Faith. They often disliked the role of lay patronage in the kirk. The theological division between neonomian and antineonomian tendencies in the kirk were highlighted by the Marrow Controversy. The Marrow of Modern Divinity was a mid-seventeenth century book with an antineonomian perspective that was reprinted in 1718 and promoted by Thomas Boston (1676–1732) and others. The book was condemned by the General Assembly, giving it widespread publicity. The decision was appealed by 12 "Marrow Men", but the repudiation was upheld in 1722 and although its supporters were not expelled, they were denied advancement and the controversy continued.

There were growing divisions between the Evangelicals and the Moderate Party. While Evangelicals emphasised the authority of the Bible and the traditions and historical documents of the kirk, the Moderates tended to stress intellectualism in theology, the established hierarchy of the kirk and attempted to raise the social status of the clergy. From the 1760s the Moderates gained an ascendancy in the General Assembly of the Church. They were led by the historian William Robertson (1721–93), who became principal of the University of Edinburgh and then by his successor George Hill (1750–1819), who was professor at the University of Aberdeen. Evangelical leaders included John Willison (1680–1750), John McLaurin (1693–1754) and Alexander Webster (1707–84). The most important figure was John Erskine (1721–1803), who was minister of Old Greyfriars Church in Edinburgh from 1768 and for 26 years a friend and colleague to Robertson. He was orthodox in doctrine, but sympathised with the Enlightenment and supported reforms in religious practice. A popular preacher, he corresponded with religious leaders in other countries, including New England theologian Johnathan Edwards (1703–58), whose ideas were a major influence on the movement in Scotland. Judged by the number of books printed in Scotland, Boston was the most popular theological writer in the movement.

== Secession ==
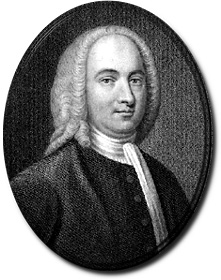
Ebenezer Erskine, the leading figure of the First Secessionist Church

The 18th century saw the beginnings of a fragmentation of the Church of Scotland that had its foundation in the Reformation. These fractures were prompted by issues of government and patronage, but reflected a wider division between the Evangelicals and the Moderate Party over fears of fanaticism by the former and the acceptance of Enlightenment ideas by the latter. Ecclesiastical patronage, the right of local lairds or other notables to appoint ministers to a parish, had been abolished at the Glorious Revolution, but it was reintroduced in the Church Patronage (Scotland) Act 1711, resulting in frequent protests from the kirk.

The First Secession was over the right to appoint in cases where a patron made no effort to fill a vacancy. The result was that a group of four ministers, led by Ebenezer Erskine, the minister of Stirling, formed a distinct "Associate Presbytery" in 1733, but were not forced from the kirk until 1740. This movement was initially very small, but was petitioned by the praying societies with requests for preaching, leading to rapid growth. Although its founding ministers were from Perthshire and Fife, the forty congregations they had established by 1740 were widely spread across the country, mainly among the middle classes of major towns. The Secessionists soon split among themselves over the issue of the burgess oath, which was administered after the 1745 rebellion as an anti-Jacobite measure, but which implied that the Church of Scotland was the only true church. The "burghers", led by Erskine, maintained that the oath could be taken, but they were excommunicated by an "anti-burgher" faction, led by Adam Gib, who established a separate General Associate Synod. In the 1790s the Seceders became embroiled in the Old and New Light controversy. The "Old Lichts" continued to follow the principles of the Covenanters, while the "New Lichts" were more focused on personal salvation, considered the strictures of the Covenants as less binding and that a connection of the church and the state was not warranted.

The second break from the kirk was also prompted by issues of patronage. Minister Thomas Gillespie (1708–74) was deposed by the General Assembly in 1752 after he refused to participate in inducting a minister to the Inverkeithing parish, since the parishioners opposed the appointment. Gillespie was joined by two other ministers and they held the first meeting of the Presbytery of Relief at Colinsburgh in Fife in 1761. While evangelical in doctrine, the Relief Church did not maintain that it was the only true church, but stated that it was still in communion with the kirk and maintained contact with Episcopalians and Independents. Like the Associate Presbytery, the movement was initially small, but benefited from the Evangelical Revival of the later eighteenth century, which helped it expand rapidly.

== Episcopalianism ==
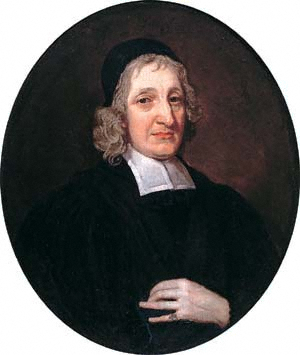
John Paterson, the last bishop of Glasgow and a non-juror

Episcopalianism had retained supporters through the civil wars and regime changes in the seventeenth century. Although the bishops had been abolished in the settlement that followed the Glorious Revolution, becoming "non-jurors", not subscribing to the right of William III and Mary II to be monarchs, they continued to consecrate Episcopalian clergy. Many clergy were "outed" from their livings, but the king had issued two acts of indulgence in 1693 and 1695, allowing those who accepted him as king to retain their livings and around a hundred took advantage of the offer. New "meeting houses" sprang up for those who continued to follow the episcopalian clergy. They generally prospered under Queen Anne and all but the hardened Jacobites would be given toleration in 1712. Since most Episcopalians gave their support to the Jacobite rebellion in 1715, they suffered a decline in fortunes. A number of the clergy were deprived and in 1719 all meeting houses where prayers were not offered for King George were closed. In 1720, the last surviving bishop died and another was appointed as "primus", without any particular episcopal see. After the Jacobite rising of 1745, there was another round of restrictions under the Toleration Act 1746 and the Penal Act 1748, and the number of clergy and congregations declined. The church was sustained by the important nobles and gentlemen in its ranks.

This period saw the establishment of Qualified Chapels, where worship was conducted according to the English Book of Common Prayer and where congregations, led by priests ordained by Bishops of the Church of England or the Church of Ireland, were willing to pray for the Hanoverians. Such chapels drew their congregations from English people living in Scotland and from Scottish Episcopalians who were not bound to the Jacobite cause. These two forms of episcopalianism existed side by side until 1788 when the Jacobite claimant Charles Edward Stuart died in exile. Unwilling to recognise his brother Henry Benedict Stuart, who was a cardinal in the Roman Catholic Church, as his heir, the non-juror Episcopalians elected to recognise the House of Hanover and offer allegiance to George III. At the repeal of the penal laws in 1792 there were twenty-four Qualified Chapels in Scotland.

== Cameronians ==
The Society People, known after one of their leaders as the Cameronians, who had not accepted the restoration of episcopacy in 1660, remained outside of the established kirk after the Revolution settlement, refusing to rejoin an "un-Covenanted" kirk. However, most of their remaining ministers re-entered the Church of Scotland. After years of persecution their numbers were few and largely confined to the southwest of the country. In the period 1714–43 they had only one minister and were unable to form a presbytery and ordain new clergy. Many joined the Secession Church in order to avoid extinction. In 1743, having obtained the services of a second minister from the Secession Church, they established themselves as the Reformed Presbyterian Church. Roughly 10,000 in number, they remained separate from other denominations and abstained from political involvement, refusing even to vote.

== Independent churches ==
Robert Haldane, who played a major part in expanding independency in Scotland

In the mid-seventeenth century, the extension of toleration to sectaries under the Commonwealth brought a number of independent movements to Scotland. The only one not to collapse after the withdrawal of the army at the Restoration in 1660 were the Quakers. Their numbers remained small in the eighteenth century and they were largely confined to the large cities and the northwest. Baptist churches had been founded in several towns during the Commonwealth, largely consisting of English soldiers and their families. They lapsed when the English occupation ended and the first Scottish Baptist church is usually thought to be founded at Keiss in 1750 by William Sinclair. Occasionally individual Presbyterian ministers led their congregations out of existing churches and into independent churches, leading to the establishment of isolated churches for groups like the Unitarians. The series of evangelical enterprises undertaken by the brothers James and Robert Haldane in the period 1796–1800, which led to the foundation of Sunday schools, day schools and tabernacles in parts of the Lowlands, Highlands and Islands, helped strengthen the Baptist and Congregational churches when the brothers later embraced adult Baptism and the congregations divided between the two traditions.

Scotland appeared to be fertile ground for Methodism in the 1740s and 1750s, when visits from figures such as John Wesley and George Whitfield attracted large audiences of presbyterians. Methodist societies were established in textile and fishing villages, particularly in Shetland, where Methodism was to enjoy its greatest relative popularity. Most members were to be in the large cities, with Glasgow and Airdrie accounting for 43 per cent of all members in 1819. However, in the 1760s the growth of the movement did not keep pace with that elsewhere in the United Kingdom, with an average annual increase of only 0.2 per cent, compared with 5, nearly 6 and nearly 8 per cent in England, Wales and Ireland respectively. The reasons for the relative failure of Methodism in Scotland have been debated by historians. The Scots preferred an ordained clergy, rather than the lay preachers common elsewhere, and when Wesley granted this concession in 1785 membership doubled in four years, but it was rescinded after this death in 1791 and adherence reduced. The middle classes may also have seen the lay positions in the church as not carrying the same status as did offices like that of elder within the presbyterian churches. Allan MacLaren has argued that the doctrinal Arminianism of Methodism conflicted with the dominant Calvinism of Scotland. The place that Methodism occupied elsewhere in the kingdom may also have been taken by the Secession and Relief churches, the last of which were seen as "Scots Methodists".

== Minor sects ==
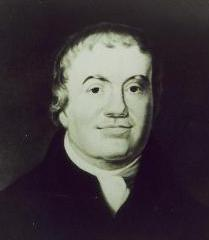
David Dale, founder of the Old Scottish Independents

As well as the series of secessionist movements, the eighteenth century saw the formation of a number of minor sects. These included the Glasites, formed by Church of Scotland minister John Glas, who was expelled from his parish of Tealing in 1730 for his objections to the state's intervention in the affairs of the kirk. He advocated a strong form of biblical literalism. With his son-in-law Robert Sandeman, from whose name they are known as the Sandemanians, he founded a number of churches in Scotland and the sect expanded to England and the United States. Closely involved with the Glasites were the followers of industrialist David Dale who broke with the kirk in the 1760s and formed the Old Scotch Independents, sometimes known as the Daleists. He preached a combination of industry and faith that led him to co-found the cotton-mill at New Lanark and to contribute to the Utopian Socialism associated with his son-in-law Robert Owen.

The Bereans were formed by John Barclay in Edinburgh in 1773. Barclay was one of the most prominent followers of moral philosopher Archibald Campbell and espoused a rigorous form of pre-destination and insisted on Biblical-based preaching. Having been rejected from various pastorships and by the General Assembly, he founded independent churches in Scotland and then in England, taking the name Bereans from the people mentioned in Acts 17:11. After Barclay's death in 1798 his followers joined the congregationalists. The Buchanites were a Millenarian cult that broke away from the Relief Church when Hugh White, minister at Irvine, declared Elspeth Buchan to be a special saint identified with the woman described in Revelation 12. They attracted less than fifty followers and having been expelled by local magistrates they formed a community at a farm known as New Cample in Nithsdale, Dumfriesshire. The sect collapsed after the death of Buchan in 1791. Other minor sects include the McMillanites, reported as a group of Covernanters who had separated from kirk discipline in Dumfriesshire in 1721. Another group in the same area, called the Hebronites, were alleged to have sworn at a minister. The Hebronites were later absorbed into the Secession Church with other Covenanters after 1736.

== Catholicism ==
Lord George Gordon, who led the campaign that defeated the implementation of the Papists Act 1778 to Scotland and lent his name to the anti-Catholic Gordon Riots

By the eighteenth century, Catholicism had been reduced to the fringes of the country, particularly the Gaelic-speaking areas of the Highlands and Islands. Numbers probably reduced in the seventeenth century and organisation had deteriorated. Pope Innocent X appointed Thomas Nicolson as the first Vicar Apostolic over the mission in 1694. The country was organised into districts and by 1703 there were thirty-three Catholic clergy. Conditions grew worse for Catholics after the Jacobite rebellions and Catholicism was reduced to little more than a poorly run mission. In 1732, it was divided into two vicariates, one for the Highlands and one for the Lowlands, each under a bishop. There were six attempts to found a seminary in the Highlands between 1732 and 1838, all of which floundered on financial issues. Clergy entered the country secretly and although services were illegal they were maintained. In 1755, it was estimated that there were only 16,500 communicants, mainly in the north and west, although the number is probably an underestimate. By the end of the century this had probably fallen by a quarter due to emigration. The Papists Act 1778 was designed to bring a measure of toleration to Catholics, but a campaign led by Lord George Gordon, that resulted anti-Catholic riots in Scotland, known after him as the Gordon Riots, meant that it was limited to England. The provisions of the Roman Catholic Relief Act 1791, which allowed freedom of worship for Catholics who took an oath of allegiance, were extended to Scotland in 1793. In 1799, the Lowland District seminary was transferred to Aquhorthies, near Inverurie in Aberdeenshire, so that it could serve the entire country. It was secretly funded by the government, who were concerned at the scale of emigration by Highland Catholics.

== Protestant missions ==
Long after the triumph of the Church of Scotland in the Lowlands, Highlanders and Islanders clung to a form of Christianity infused with animistic folk beliefs and practices. The remoteness of the region and the lack of a Gaelic-speaking clergy undermined missionary efforts. The Scottish Society in Scotland for Propagating Christian Knowledge (SSPCK) was founded by royal charter in 1708. Its aim was partly religious and partly cultural, intending to "wear out" Gaelic and "learn the people the English tongue". By 1715, it was running 25 schools, by 1755 it was 116 and by 1792 it was 149, but most were on the edges of the Highlands. The difficulty of promoting Protestantism and English in a Gaelic speaking region, eventually led to a change of policy in the SSPCK, and in 1754 it sanctioned the printing of a New Testament with Gaelic and English text on facing pages. The government only began to seriously promote Protestantism from 1725, when it began to make a grant to the General Assembly known as the Royal Bounty. Part of this went towards itinerant ministers, but by 1764 there were only ten. Probably more significant for the spread of Protestantism were the lay catechists, who met the people on the Sabbath, read Scripture, and joined them in Psalms and prayers. They would later be important in the Evangelical revival.

== Evangelical Revival ==
George Whitefield preaching at Cambuslang in 1742

From the later 1730s Scotland experienced a version of the Evangelical revival that also affected England and Wales and North America. Protestant congregations, usually in a specific locations, experienced intense "awakenings" of enthusiasm, renewed commitment and, sometimes, rapid expansion. This was first seen at Easter Ross in the Highlands in 1739 and most famously in the Cambuslang Wark (work) near Glasgow in 1742, where intense religious activity culminated in a crowd of perhaps 30,000 gathering there to hear English preacher George Whitefield. Scotland was also visited 22 times by John Wesley, the English evangelist and founder of Methodism, between 1751 and 1790.

Most of the new converts were relatively young and from the lower groups in society, such as small tenants, craftsmen, servants and the unskilled, with a relatively high proportion of unmarried women. This has been seen as a reaction against the oligarchical nature of the established kirk, which was dominated by local lairds and heritors. Unlike awakenings elsewhere, the revival in Scotland did not give rise to a major religious movement, but benefited the secession churches. The revival was particularly significant in the Highlands, where the lack of a clear parochial structure led to a pattern of spiritual enthusiasm, recession and renewal, often instigated by lay catechists, known as "the Men", who would occasionally emerge as charismatic leaders. The revival left a legacy of strict Sabbatarianism and local identity.

From the late eighteenth century Scotland gained many of the organisations associated with the revival in England, including Sunday schools, mission schools, ragged schools, Bible societies and improvement classes. Because the revival occurred at the same time as the transformation of the Highlands into a crofting society, Evangelicalism was often linked to popular protest against patronage and the clearances, while the Moderates became identified with the interests of the landholding classes. It laid the ground for the Great Disruption in the mid-nineteenth century, leading to the Evangelicals taking control of the General Assembly and those in the Highlands joining the Free Church of Scotland in large numbers.

== Popular religion ==
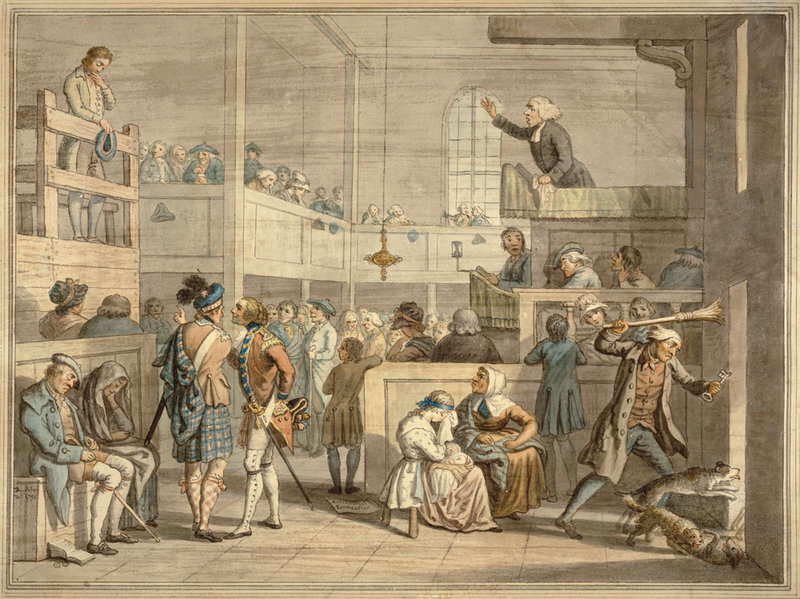
The Black Stool by David Allan (1744–96). A young bachelor is accused of fornication.

At the beginning of the century, the kirk had considerable control over the lives of the people. It had a major role in the Poor Law and schools, which were administered through the parishes, and over the morals of the population, particularly over sexual offences such as adultery and fornication. A rebuke was necessary for moral offenders to "purge their scandal". This involved standing or sitting before the congregation for up to three Sundays and enduring a rant by the minister. There was sometimes a special repentance stool near the pulpit for this purpose. In a few places the subject was expected to wear sackcloth. From the 1770s kirk session increasingly administered private rebukes, particularly for men from the social elites, while until the 1820s the poor were almost always give a public rebuke. In the early part of the century the kirk, particularly in the Lowlands, attempted to suppress dancing and events like penny weddings at which secular tunes were played. The oppression of secular music and dancing by the kirk began to ease between about 1715 and 1725.

Strict Sabbatarianism was vital to Presbyterian culture. For members of separatist churches, the Sunday walk to the meeting house, sometimes as much as thirty miles, marked the intensity of dissent and strict keeping of the Sabbath was a mark of true membership. Fast days were also important, particularly in Seeder culture. They often did not involve actual fasting, but focused on stricter observance of the Sabbath. The established kirk had three a year, but the seeders as many as six.

In Presbyterian worship the sermon, which could be several hours long, was seen as central, meaning that services tended to have a didactic and wordy character. There were also Bible readings and the only participation by the congregation was musical, in the singing of the psalms. From the late seventeenth century the common practice was lining out, by which the precentor sang or read out each line and it was then repeated by the congregation. From the second quarter of the eighteenth century it was argued that this should be abandoned in favour of the practice of singing stanza by stanza. These innovations became linked to a choir movement that included the setting up of schools to teach new tunes and singing in four parts.

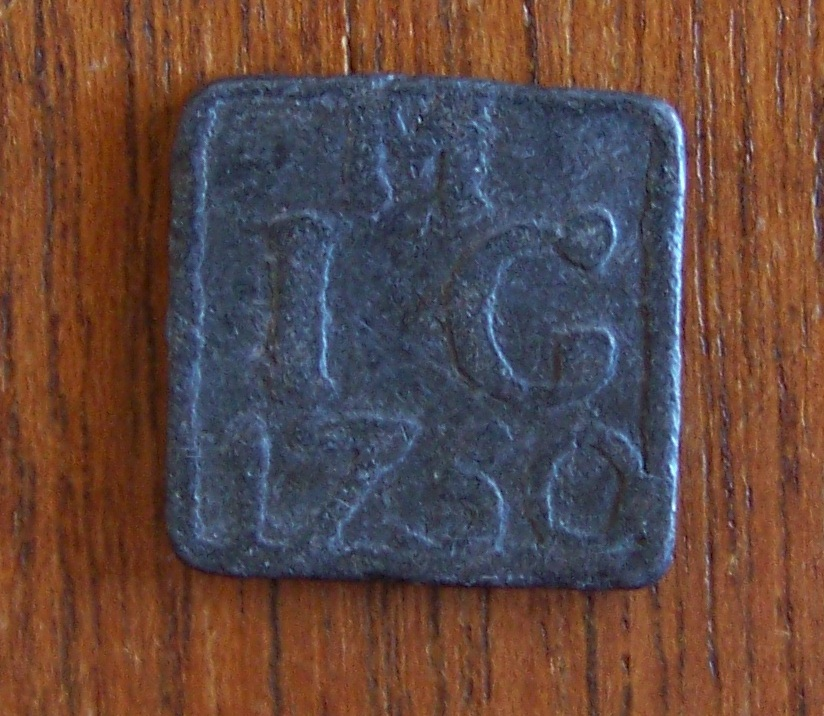
A Scottish communion token from 1750

Among Presbyterians, communion was the central occasion of the church, conducted infrequently, at most once a year, often taking a week of festivals as part of a communion season. Communicants were examined by a minister and elders, proving their knowledge of the Shorter Catechism. They were then given communion tokens that entitled them to take part in the ceremony. Long tables were set up in the middle of the church at which communicants sat to receive communion. Where ministers refused or neglected parish communion, largely assemblies were carried out in the open air, often combining several parishes. These large gatherings were discouraged by the General Assembly, but continued. They could become mixed with secular activities and were commemorated as such by Robert Burns in the poem Holy Fair. They could also be occasions for evangelical meetings, as at the Cambuslang Wark.

Among Episcopalians, Qualified Chapels used the English Book of Common Prayer. They installed organs and hired musicians, following the practice in English parish churches, singing in the liturgy as well as metrical psalms, while the non-jurors had to worship covertly and less elaborately. When the two branches united in the 1790s, the non-juring branch soon absorbed the musical and liturgical traditions of the qualified churches.

Catholic worship was deliberately low key, usually in the private houses of recusant landholders or in domestic buildings adapted for services. Surviving chapels from this period are generally austere and simply furnished. Typical worship consisted of a sermon, long vernacular prayers and an unsung Low Mass in Latin. Musical accompaniment was prohibited until the nineteenth century, when organs began to be introduced into chapels.
