= John Barclay (anatomist) =

Scottish comparative anatomist and extramural teacher in anatomy

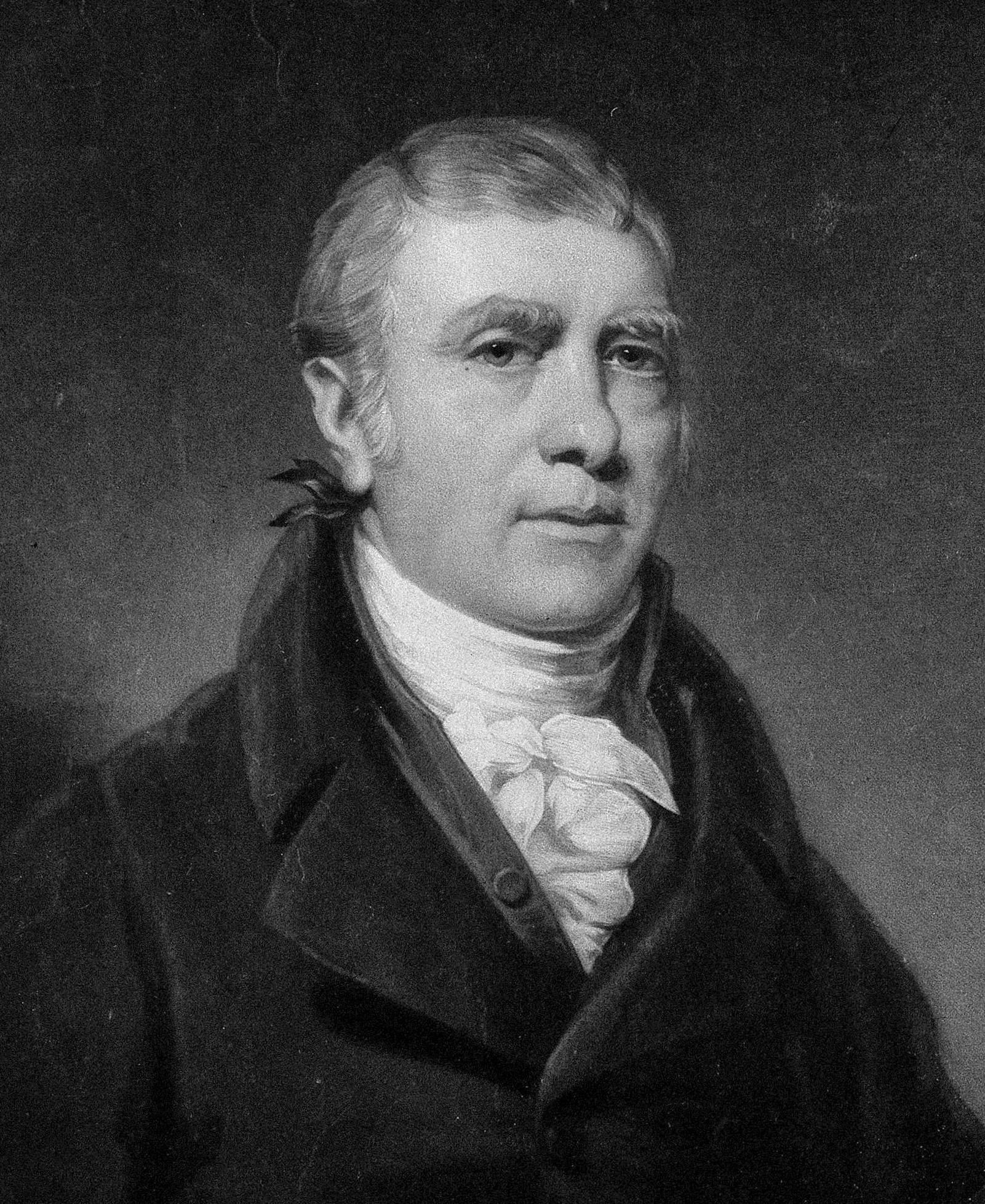
John Barclay

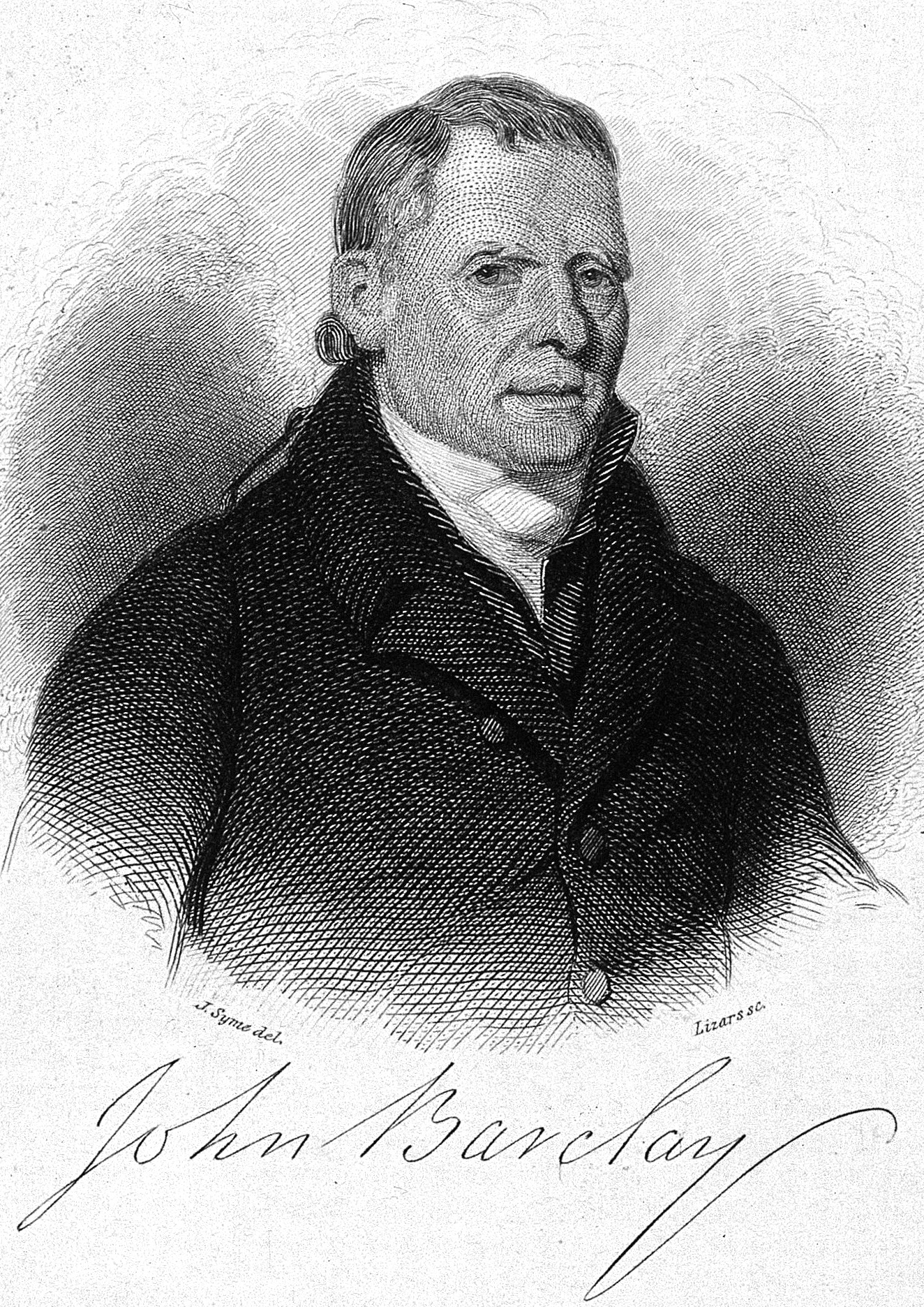
John Barclay later in life

John Barclay FRSE FRCPE FRCSE FLS MWS (10 December 1758 – 21 August 1826) was a Scottish comparative anatomist, extramural teacher in anatomy, and director of the Highland Society of Scotland.

== Life ==
He was born in Cairn, Perthshire, on 10 December 1758, the son of a farmer, and nephew of John Barclay, who established the Berean Church.

Educated at Muthill parish school, Barclay initially studied divinity at the University of St Andrews, and served as a minister. Then working as a family tutor, he educated himself in biological topics and anatomy. Pupils of his entered the University of Edinburgh in 1789, and Barclay became an assistant there to anatomist John Bell, and was associated with his brother, Charles Bell. His employer, Sir James Campbell, financed the completion of his medical course.

Barclay qualified M.D. at Edinburgh, before studying anatomy under Andrew Marshal for a year at Thavie's Inn in London.

He returned to Edinburgh and established himself as an anatomical lecturer in 1797. Until 1825, he delivered two complete courses of human anatomy, a morning and an evening one, every winter session, and for several years before his death gave a summer course on comparative anatomy. His classes gradually grew in reputation; in 1804 he was formally recognised as a lecturer on anatomy and surgery by the Royal College of Surgeons of Edinburgh, and in 1806 he became a fellow of the Royal College of Physicians of Edinburgh. In 1810 he was elected a member of the Aesculapian Club. In 1811 Barclay was elected a member of the Harveian Society of Edinburgh and served as President in 1815 and 1819.

When a new chair of comparative anatomy for the University of Edinburgh was proposed in 1816, Barclay was the leading candidate. However, the proposal was defeated by the concerted opposition of a number of the incumbent medical professors, led by John Hope, Robert Jameson and Alexander Monro, tertius, who feared the new chair would encroach on their own prerogatives. This episode provided the subject of a memorable caricature by John Kay.

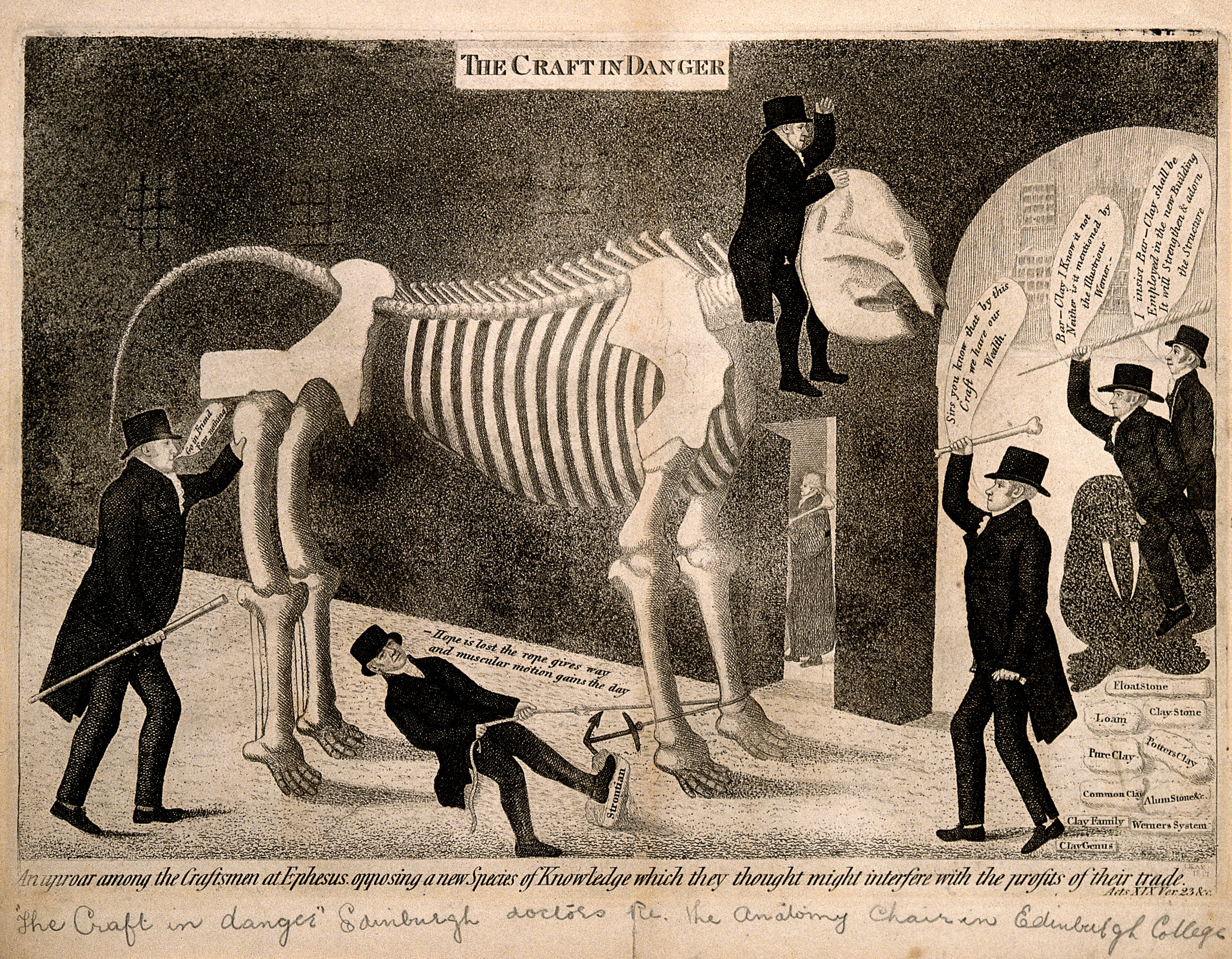
Satirical etching by John Kay: Barclay attempts unsuccessfully to enter the University of Edinburgh as its new professor of comparative anatomy astride an elephant skeleton, opposed by the incumbent medical professors.

== Last years and death ==
For the final two years of his life Barclay was too ill to teach, during which his classes were carried on by Robert Knox, another former pupil.

He died at Argyll Square in Edinburgh on 21 August 1826, and was buried in Restalrig Churchyard on the east side of the city.

== Works ==
Barclay contributed the article Physiology to the third edition of the Encyclopædia Britannica (1797). He developed ideas for a nomenclature of human anatomy based on scientific principles in A New Anatomical Nomenclature (1803). In 1808, he published a treatise on The Muscular Motions of the Human Body, arranged according to regions and systems, and with applications to surgery. This was followed in 1812 by his Description of the Arteries of the Human Body, the result of original study and dissection. A second edition appeared in 1820.

He furnished descriptive matter to a series of plates illustrating the human skeleton and the skeletons of some animals, engraved by Edward Mitchell of Edinburgh in 1819–20. Several of his lectures on anatomy were published posthumously in 1827. Another work was An Inquiry into the Opinions, Ancient and Modern, concerning Life and Organisation, published in 1822. In this work Barclay gives a spirited defense of vitalism against a catalogue of thinkers he considered to be advocates of materialistic theories of life, including Erasmus Darwin, William Lawrence and Jean-Baptiste Fray. The noted Scottish zoologist and geologist John Fleming wrote that Concerning Life and Organization "should be perused with care by every student of Anatomy and Natural History, as an effective preservative against the doctrines of Materialism".

He wrote Remarks on Mr. John Bell's Anatomy of the heart & arteries under the name "Jonathan Dawplucker, Esq."

== Family ==
Barclay married Eleanora, daughter of his former employer Sir James Campbell of Aberuchill, in 1811. They had no children and after his death she married Charles Oliphant WS.

== Legacy ==
Barclay gave his large collection of specimens to the Royal College of Surgeons of Edinburgh in 1821, under the condition that a suitable hall be built to display all the materials together, associated with his name. In 1828 his collection became the Barcleian Museum. It can now be seen at Surgeons' Hall.

== Pupils ==
- Sir George Ballingall (1780–1855)
- William Dick (1793–1866).
- Dr Robert Knox (1791–1862)
- Robert Liston (1794–1847)
- Robert Nasmyth (1791-1870)
- James Syme (1799–1870)
- William Sharpey (1802-1880)
