= Acts 17 =

- ← chapter 16 chapter 18 →
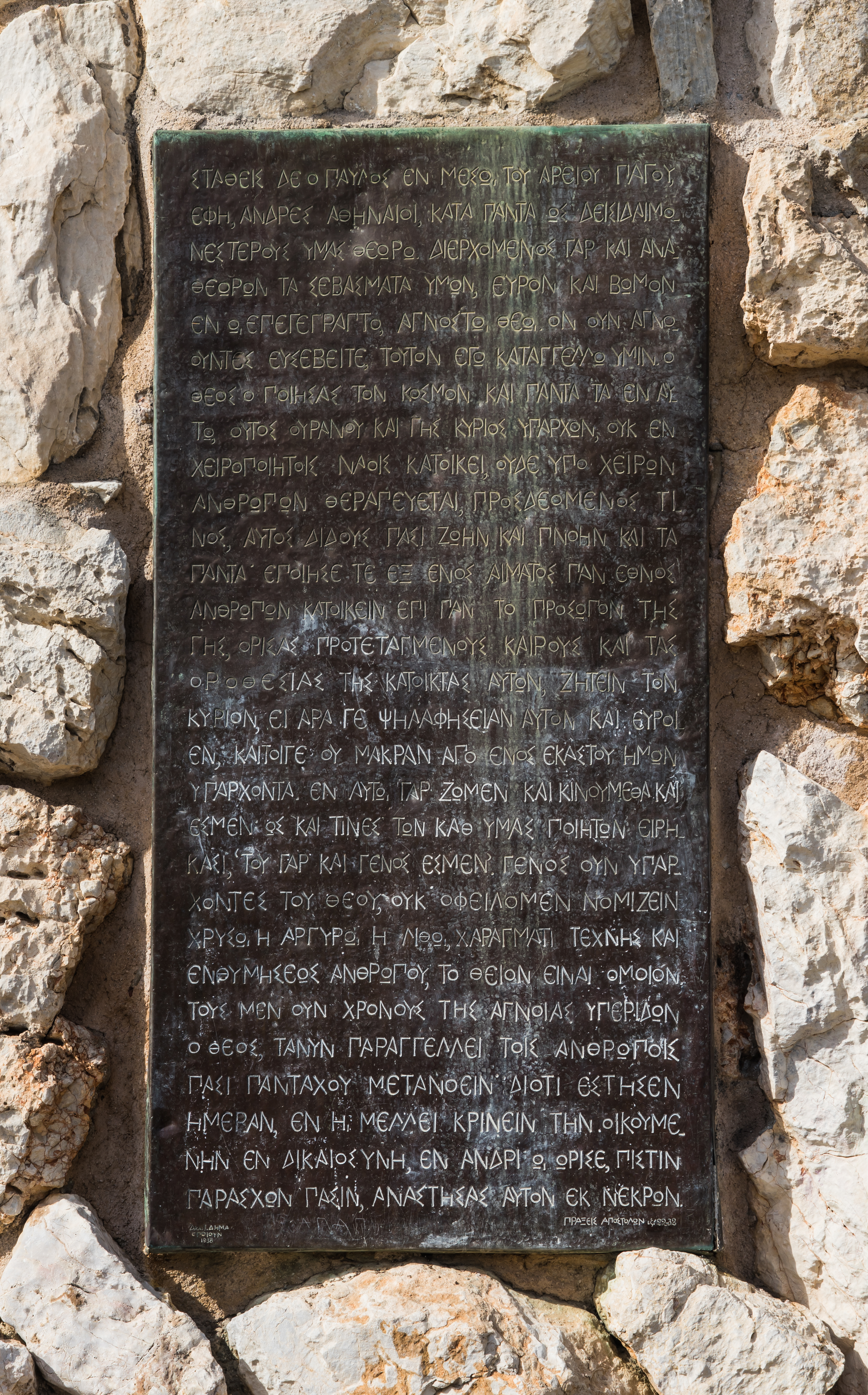
- Bronze plaque dedicated to the visit of apostle Paul to the Areopagus Hill in Athens. It cites the text of Acts 17:22–32. Image taken in 2016.
- Book: Acts of the Apostles
- Category: Church history
- Christian Bible part: New Testament
- Order in the Christian part: 5

Acts 17 is the seventeenth chapter of the Acts of the Apostles in the New Testament of the Christian Bible. It continues the second missionary journey of Paul, together with Silas and Timothy: in this chapter, the Christian gospel is preached in Thessalonica, Berea and Athens. Early Christian tradition uniformly affirmed that Luke composed this book as well as the Gospel of Luke. Critical opinion on the tradition was evenly divided at the end of the 20th century.

== Text ==
The original text was written in Koine Greek. This chapter is divided into 34 verses.

=== Textual witnesses ===
Some early manuscripts containing the text of this chapter are:

In Greek

- Codex Vaticanus (AD 325–350)
- Codex Sinaiticus (330–360)
- Codex Bezae (c. 400)
- Codex Alexandrinus (400–440)
- Papyrus 127 (5th century; extant verses 1–10)
- Codex Laudianus (c. 550)

In Latin

- Codex Laudianus (~550; complete)
- León palimpsest (7th century; 1–25)

=== Old Testament references ===
- Acts 17:25: Psalm 50:8
- Acts 17:29: Isaiah 40:18

=== New Testament references ===
- Acts 17:23: 2 Thessalonians 2:4
- Acts 17:24: Acts 7:48

== Locations ==
Places mentioned in (blue) and related to (black) this chapter.

This chapter mentions the following places (in the order of their appearance):

- Amphipolis
- Apollonia
- Thessalonica
- Berea
- Athens

== Timeline ==
The second missionary journey of Paul took place in around AD 49.

== Distances ==
The distance from Philippi to Amphipolis is about 33 miles (53 km) by Via Egnatia (which length was over 500 miles (800 km) from Hellespont to Dyrrhachium) and further on this road from Amphipholis to Apollonia in the district of Mydonia is about 30 miles (48 km), then 37 miles (60 km) from Apollonia to Thessalonica, as noted in Antonine Itinerary. From Thessalonica to Berea (modern Veria) is about 80 kilometres (50 mi) westward. Paul then traveled to 'the sea', which would have been at least 42 km at the nearest point, and then south to Athens, approximately 300 km (most likely by sea, though it is possible that he walked the coastal road instead). The journey 'by night' from Thessalonica to Berea (Acts 17:10) presumably took more than one night.

== In Thessalonica (17:1–9) ==
Paul, Silas and Timothy continued to travel westwards from Philippi on Via Egnatia, passing several cities before arriving at Thessalonica, which had "a well-established Jewish community with a synagogue" (verse 1), which Paul visited, "as was his custom", on three successive sabbaths to speak about the gospel (verse 2). That he was allowed to speak on three successive sabbaths gives an indication of "the respect commanded by his character as a Rabbi, and, it may be, by his earnest eloquence".

After some initial success among synagogue members extending to the receptive Gentile adherents (verse 4), an outbreak of 'jealousy' (or 'fundamentalist zeal': Ζηλώσαντες, zēlosantes, verse 5) occurred among "the Jews", who took the city mob to launch an attack on Paul and Silas. When Paul and Silas could not be found, the mob took a man named "Jason", as one of Paul's followers, to the civic authorities (called politarchs in verse 6; a title attested in inscriptional evidence for Thessalonica) with a charge of disturbance (verses 6–7) that Paul's teaching of "the Kingdom" (cf. Acts 28:31) was 'inherently incompatible with the personal oaths of loyalty to the emperor' as 'demanded of all inhabitants of the empire'.

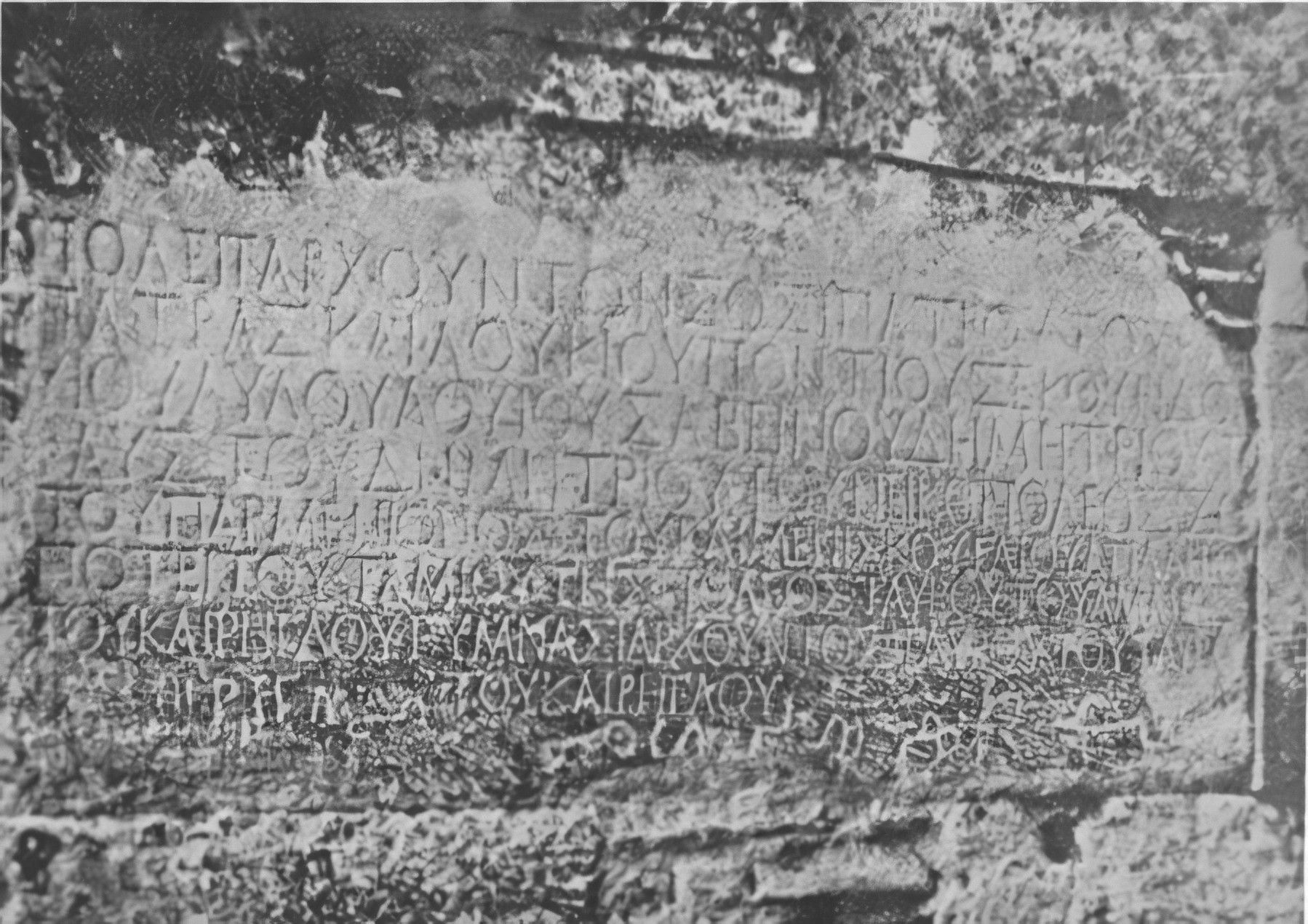
On-site photograph of the 2nd century AD Politarch inscription in Thessalonica.

== In Berea (17:10–15) ==
Paul's departure from Thessalonica "by night" (verse 10) reflected "the need [for] immediate action", which W. R. Nicoll attributes either to "obedience to the direct charge of the magistrates that Paul should not come again to Thessalonica, or [to the] danger of a revival of the tumult". He may have journeyed to Berea because of its "comparative seclusion". His mission was initially dependent on 'the networks of the Jewish diaspora': each time he arrived in an unfamiliar city, Paul first visited a synagogue to preach the gospel among the Jewish people. The Jews in Berea were noted as "more noble" (Greek: eugenesteroi, v. 11: NRSV: "more receptive"), as they were willing to give a 'careful and open-minded examination' (Greek: anakrinontes, v. 11) of Paul's teaching, before many of them came to belief (verse 12). There is a contrast between "women of high standing and men" who believe (verse 12) and "the crowds" ('the urban proletariat'), who were agitated by the Jews of Thessalonica (verse 13).

== In Athens (17:16–21) ==
The absence of any mention of places between Berea and Athens provides presumptive evidence that Paul did indeed travel by sea, "rounding the promontory of Sunium, [entering] Athens by the Piræus". That he spent some time waiting in Athens (verse 16) is confirmed by 1 Thessalonians 3:1–6, which must have been written not long after this time. The philosophical scene (verse 18) was reminiscent of the classical period in Athens, when Socrates engaged in philosophical dialogue (Greek: dielegeto, "argued', verse 17) in the streets and agora of Athens, and the charge against Paul about proclaiming "foreign divinities" (Greek: xenon daimonion, verse 18) would recall the charge brought against Socrates of preaching "new divinities" (Greek: kaina daimonia: cf. Xenophon, Memorabilia 1.1.1–4; only here in the New Testament that daimonia has the neutral Greek sense 'divine beings' instead of 'evil spirits'). The Areopagus was the chief administrative body at that time in Athens.

=== Verse 18 ===
Then certain Epicurean and Stoic philosophers encountered him. And some said, "What does this babbler want to say?"
Others said, "He seems to be a proclaimer of foreign gods," because he preached to them Jesus and the resurrection.

Epicureans and Stoics are from two most dominant and popular schools of philosophy in Athens at that time (more than Academics and Peripatetics) and also with the greater contrast of teachings with the doctrines of Christianity, that Paul preached ("encountered" or "in conflict with", from Greek: συνέβαλλον, syneballon; cf. Luke 14:31).

- "Babbler": translated from Greek: σπερμολογος, spermologos literally "seed-picker", figuratively "one who picks up scraps of knowledge".

== Addressing the Areopagus (17:22–34) ==
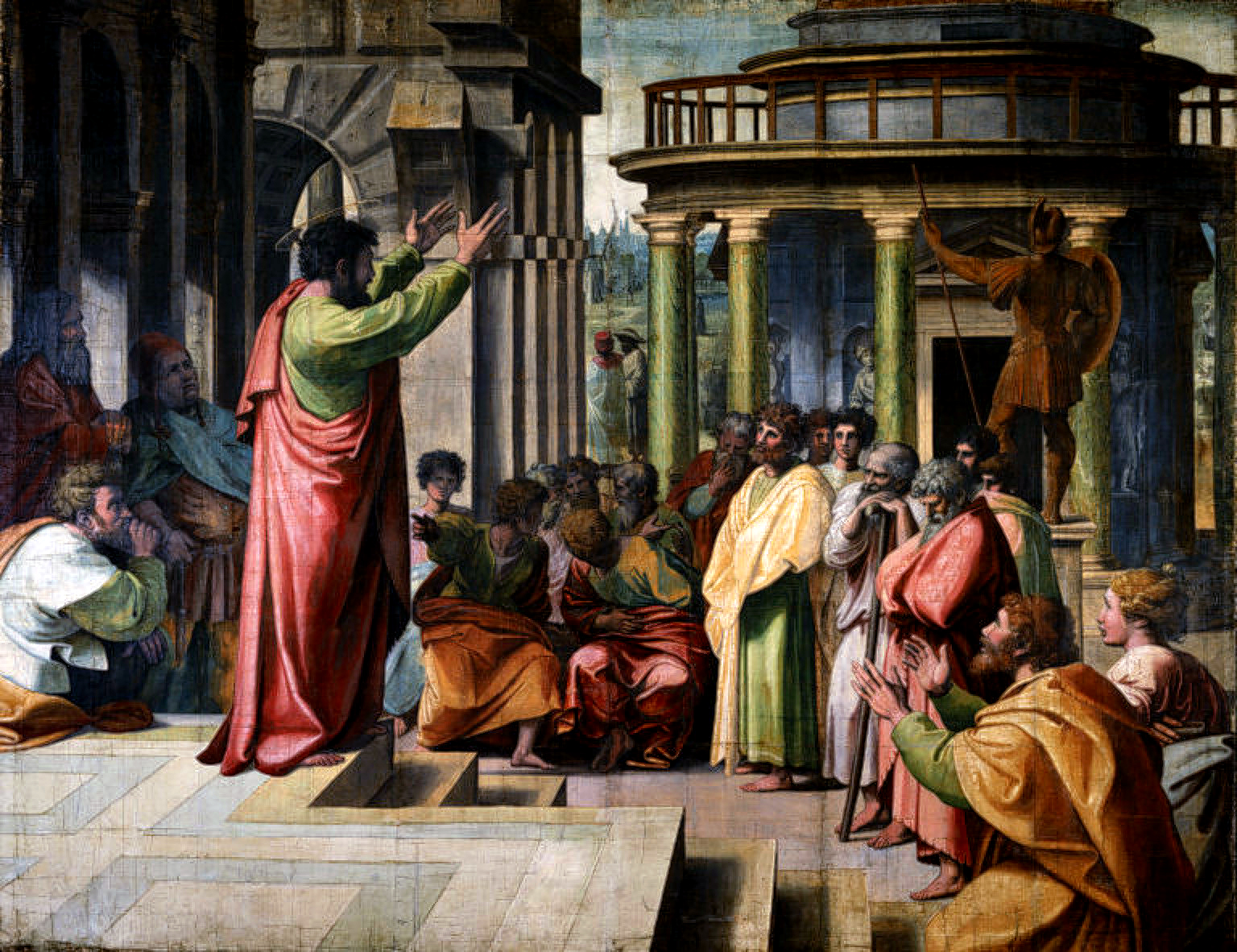
Saint Paul delivering the Areopagus Sermon in Athens, by Raphael, 1515.

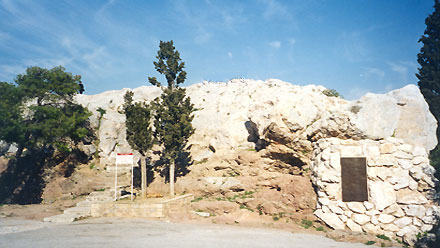
Engraved plaque containing Apostle Paul's sermon, at the Areopagus, Athens, Greece.

The speech, known as the Areopagus sermon, refers to a sermon or explanation delivered by Apostle Paul at the Areopagus in Athens, and described in Acts 17:16–34. The Areopagus sermon is the most dramatic and fullest reported speech of the missionary career of Saint Paul and followed a shorter address in Lystra Acts 14:15–17. Paul explained concepts such as the resurrection of the dead and salvation, in effect a prelude to the future discussions of Christology. According to the record, after the sermon, a number of people became followers of Paul. These included a woman named Damaris, and Dionysius, a member of the Areopagus. This latter has at times been suggested as Dionysius the Areopagite, but that may be a historical confusion.

=== Verse 28 ===
for in Him we live and move and have our being, as also some of your own poets have said, 'For we are also His offspring'.

- "For in Him we live and move and have our being": is quoted from Cretica (Κρητικά) by Epimenides as found by J. Rendel Harris based on a 9th-century Syriac commentary by Isho'dad of Merv on the Acts of the Apostles.
- "'For we are also His offspring'": Paul might take this quotation from either of two poets:
  - Aratus, probably of Tarsus or Soli in Cilicia (~272 BC), thus Paul's countryman. The words τοῦ γὰρ καὶ γένος ἐσμέν ("For we too are his offspring") are found in a didactic poem titled "Phenomena", comprising the main facts of astronomical and meteorological science at that time, starting with an invocation to Zeus. (Note: "From Zeus begin; never let us leave His name unloved. With Him, with Zeus, are filled All paths we tread, and all the marts of men; Filled, too, the sea, and every creek and bay; And all in all things need we help of Zeus, For we too are his offspring." —Aratus, Phænomena 1–5. Cited in Ellicott's Bible Commentary for English Readers. Acts 17.)
  - Cleanthes (~300 BC), of Assos in Mysia, who wrote ἐκ σοῦ γὰρ γένος ἐσμέν ("For we thine offspring are") in a hymn to Zeus. (Note: "Most glorious of immortals, many-named, Almighty and for ever, thee, O Zeus, Sovran o’er Nature, guiding with thy hand All things that are, we greet with praises. Thee ’Tis meet that mortals call with one accord, For we thine offspring are, and we alone Of all that live and move upon this earth, Receive the gift of imitative speech." —Cleanthes, Hymn to Zeus. Cited in Ellicott's Bible Commentary for English Readers. Acts 17.)

== See also ==
- Jason of Thessalonica
- Paul the Apostle
- Silas
- Timothy
- Unknown God
- Acts 14, Acts 15, and Acts 16

== Sources ==
- Alexander, Loveday (2007). "62. Acts". In Barton, John; Muddiman, John (eds.). The Oxford Bible Commentary (first (paperback) ed.). Oxford University Press. pp. 1028–1061. ISBN 978-0199277186.
- Coogan, Michael David (2007). Coogan, Michael David; Brettler, Marc Zvi; Newsom, Carol Ann; Perkins, Pheme (eds.). The New Oxford Annotated Bible with the Apocryphal/Deuterocanonical Books: New Revised Standard Version, Issue 48 (Augmented 3rd ed.). Oxford University Press. ISBN 9780195288810.
