= Beroea (disambiguation) =

Beroea was an ancient city of the Hellenistic period and Roman Empire in Macedonia. Beroea or Berœa may also refer to:

- Aleppo or Beroea, a city in Syria
- Beroea of Epirus, ancient Greek princess

== See also ==
- Beroe (disambiguation)
- Veria, a city in northern Greece on the site of the ancient Beroea
