= Euonyme =

In Greek mythology, Euonyme (Ancient Greek: Εὐωνύμη, romanized: Euōnýmē, lit. 'of good name', 'honored', 'fortunate' or 'prosperous') was a deity identified with the earth goddess Gaea. She was considered to be the mother of Erinyes by Scotus ("Darkness"). According to Epimenides, by Cronus, she bore the Erinyes, Aphrodite and the Moirai.
