= Menecrates of Ephesus =

Greek didactic poet of the Hellenistic period

Menecrates of Ephesus (/məˈnɛkrətiːz/; Ancient Greek: Μενεκράτης ὁ Ἐφέσιος; 330–270 BC) was a Greek didactic poet of the Hellenistic period. Menecrates composed a poem titled Works, which was inspired by Hesiod's Works and Days, This poem also incorporated a discussion of bees, drawing from Aristotle's studies. Menecrates served as the mentor to Aratus, the renowned astronomical poet. The remaining fragments of Menecrates' works were compiled by Hermann Diels in his 1901 publication Poetarum Philosophorum Fragmenta.
