= Si deus si dea =

Phrase in Roman religion

Si deus si dea is an Archaic Latin phrase meaning "whether god or goddess". It was used to address a deity of unknown gender. It was also written sive deus sive dea, sei deus sei dea, or sive mas sive femina ("whether male or female").

The phrase can be found on several ancient monuments. Archaic Roman inscriptions such as this may have been written to protect the identity of the god if Rome were captured by an enemy. The construction was often used when invoking the god of a place (e.g., "Be you god or goddess who reigns over Carthage, grant us..."). The classical scholar Edward Courtney claimed it was "intended to cover all bases as an acknowledgement of the limitations of human knowledge about divine powers".

== Monuments ==
=== Altar to the Unknown God ===
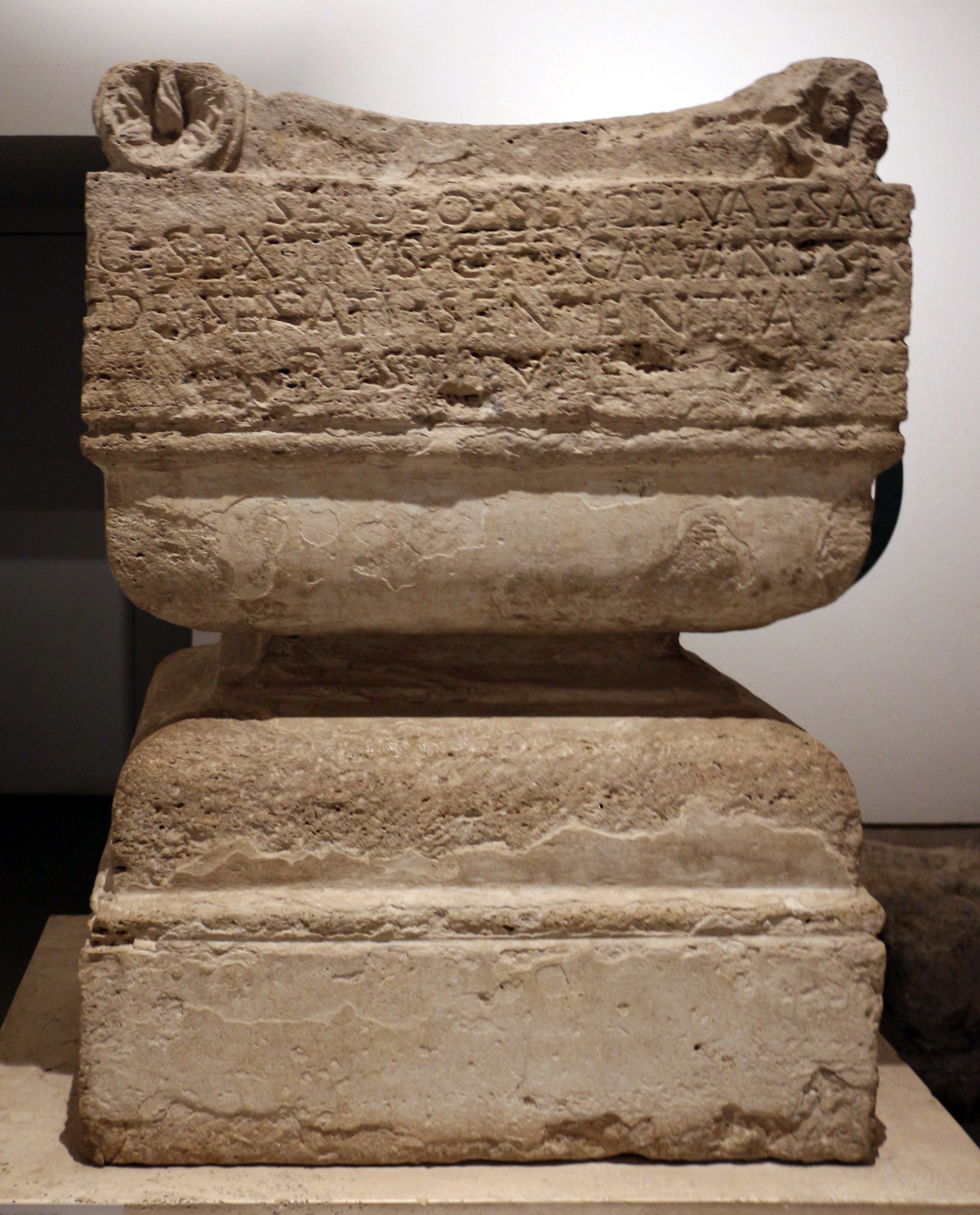
The altar as it stands in the Palatine Hill Museum today.

In 1820, an altar was discovered on the Palatine Hill with an Old Latin inscription:

SEI·DEO·SEI·DEIVAE·SAC
C·SEXTIVS·C·F·CALVINVS·PR
DE·SENATI·SENTENTIA
RESTITVIT

which can be transliterated into the modern form as:

Sei deo sei deivae sac(rum)
C(aius) Sextius C(ai) f(ilius) Calvinus pr(aetor)
de senati sententia
restituit

and translated as:

Whether sacred to god or to goddess,
Gaius Sextius Calvinus, son of Gaius, praetor,
on a vote of the senate,
restored this.

The altar is regarded as a late Roman Republic restoration of an archaic original. In the nineteenth century it was misidentified as a famous altar to Aius Locutius. The real identity of the divinity cannot be known, as it does not specify whether it is a god or a goddess. The praetor Gaius Sextius C. f. Calvinus may have restored an earlier altar reading "sei deo sei deivae", or he may have been restoring an altar that had been left to decay, after the god or goddess to whom it had originally been dedicated was forgotten.

=== Fertor Resius ===
Close to the site, four inscribed columns were found dating to the Julio-Claudian period. Column A (now missing) read "Marspiter", or "Father Mars", in Archaic Latin. Column B reads "Remureine", which possibly means "In Memory of Remus." Column C reads "anabestas", possibly referring to a goddess named Anabesta, or else to the Greek anabasio ("who goes up"), interpreted as a reference to Remus' scaling of the Roman walls. Column D, the longest inscription, reads:

Fertor Resius
rex Aequeicolus
is preimus
ius fetiale paravit
inde p(opulus) R(omanus) discipleinam excepit.
Fertor Resius,
Aequian king,
he first
introduced the ius fetiale,
from him the Roman people
learned the discipline [of making treaties].

Livy ascribed the institution of the fetiales to Ancus Marcius, and claimed that the ius fetiale came to Rome from the Aequicoli.

== See also ==
- Unknown God
