= Damaris (biblical figure) =

Greek saint (named in Acts of the Apostles)

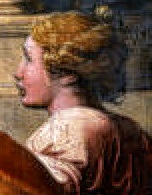
Detail of Raphael's St Paul Preaching in Athens depicting Damaris.

Damaris (Ancient Greek: Δάμαρις) is the name of a woman mentioned in a single verse in Acts of the Apostles (17:34) as one of those present when Paul of Tarsus preached in Athens in front of the Athenian Areopagus in c. AD 55.

== Biblical narrative ==
Together with Dionysius the Areopagite Damaris embraced the Christian faith following Paul's Areopagus sermon. The verse reads:

Howbeit certain men clave unto him, and believed: among the which was Dionysius the Areopagite, and a woman named Damaris, and others with them. (KJV)

As usually women were not present in Areopagus meetings, Damaris has traditionally been assumed to have been a hetaira (courtesan, high-status prostitute); modern commentators have alternatively suggested she might also have been a follower of the Stoics (who welcomed women among their ranks; this may explain why her conversion was so easy, since the Stoic's Zeus and the god preached by Paul were very similar), or a foreigner visiting Athens. The Georgian text of Acts makes Damaris the wife of Dionysius.

== Veneration ==
She is a saint of the Greek Orthodox Church, remembered on 3 October together with Dionysius the Areopagite and two other disciples of Dionysius, who also became martyrs. 3 October in the Julian calendar, which is used by the Old Calendarists, currently coincides with 16 October in the Gregorian calendar.

== Etymology ==
The etymology of the name is uncertain. Proposals include derivation from damar δάμαρ "wife, spouse", a contraction of the classical Greek name Damarete Δαμαρέτη (attested as the name of a daughter of Theron of Acragas and wife of Gelo), or derivation from damalis δάμαλις "heifer"; a Coptic derivation has also been considered.
