= Dionysius the Areopagite =

Greek bishop and saint

Saint Dionysius the Areopagite
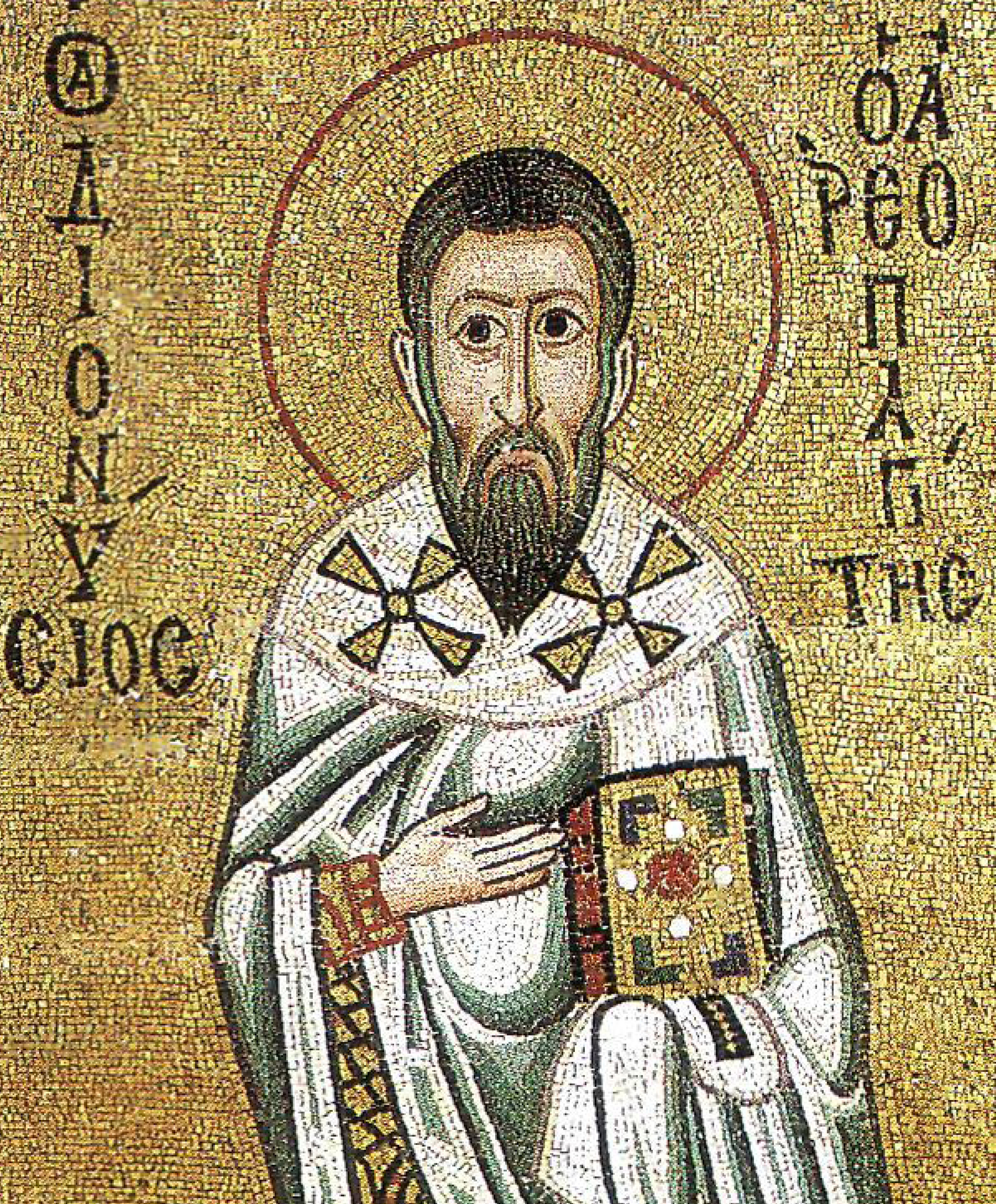
- Mosaic of Dionysius in Hosios Loukas monastery

Hieromartyr and Bishop of Athens
- Born: 1st century AD
- Died: 1st century AD
- Venerated in: Catholic Church; Eastern Orthodox Church; Oriental Orthodox Churches
- Feast: 3 October; Thursday after fifth Sunday after feast of the Holy Cross (Armenian Apostolic Church); 9 October; Church of England, 1662 Book of Common Prayer
- Attributes: Vested as a bishop, holding a Gospel Book
- Patronage: Athens, Crotone, Jerez de la Frontera and Ojén

Dionysius the Areopagite (/daɪəˈnɪsiəs/; Ancient Greek: Διονύσιος ὁ Ἀρεοπαγίτης Dionysios ho Areopagitēs) was an Athenian judge at the Areopagus Court in Athens, who lived in the first century. A convert to Christianity, he is venerated as a saint by multiple Christian denominations.

== Life ==
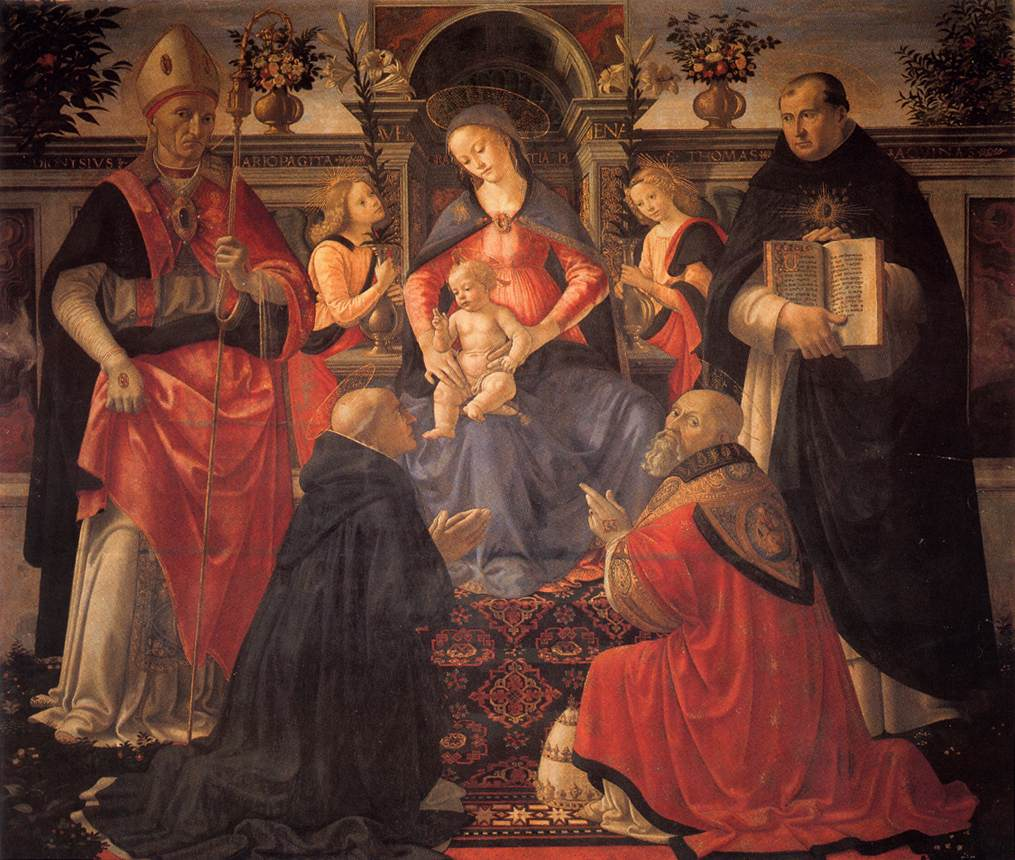
Dionysius the Areopagite with Thomas Aquinas, Madonna and the Child. Madonna and Child Enthroned between Angels and Saints by Domenico Ghirlandaio 1486.

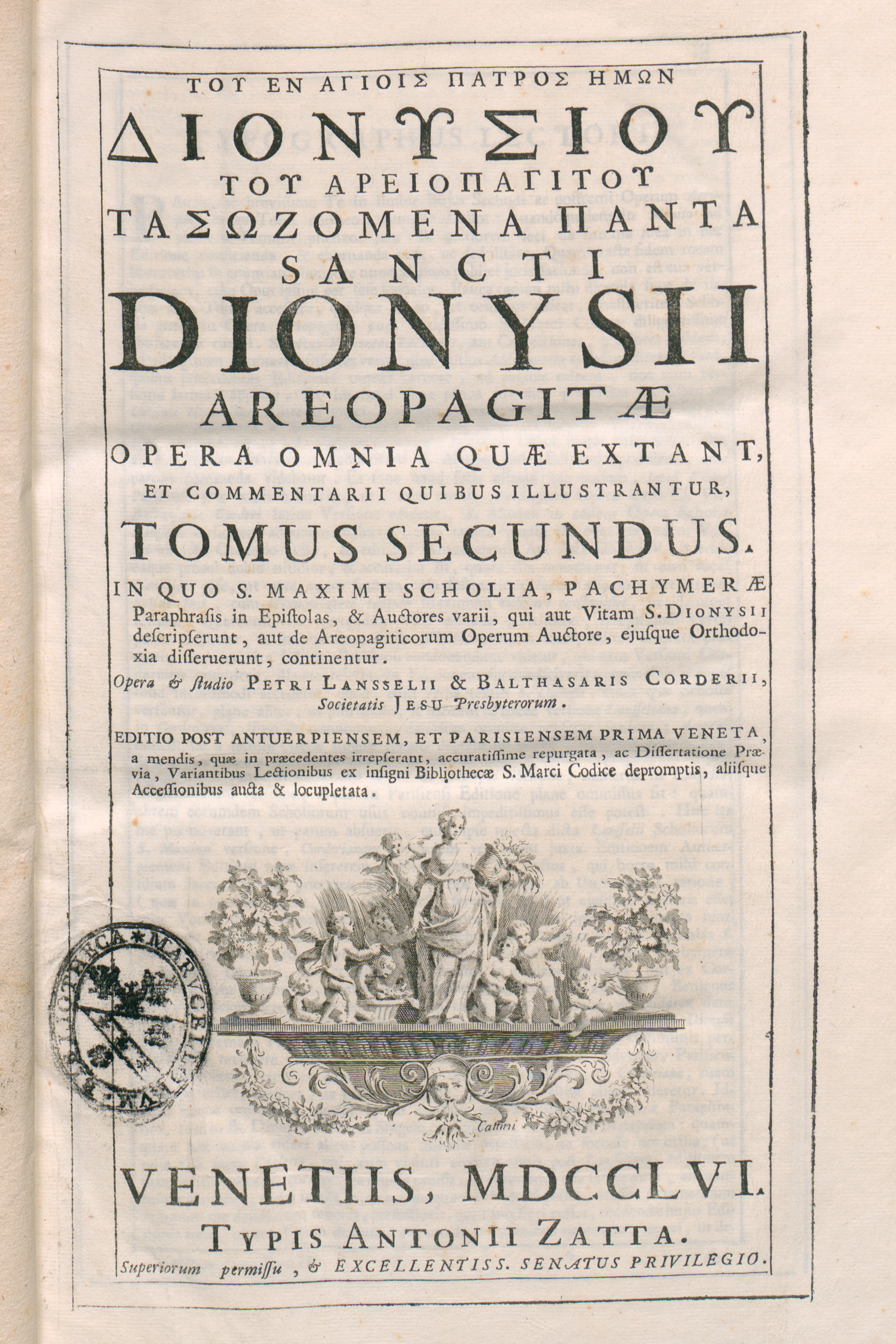
Διονυσίου του Αρεοπαγίτου, τα σωζόμενα πάντα, or Sancti Dionysii Areopagitæ, opera omnia quæ extant [All extant works of Dionysius the Areopagite] (Venice: Antonio Zatta, 1756)

As related in the Acts of the Apostles (Acts 17:34), he was converted to Christianity by the preaching of Paul the Apostle, being first stirred to Christian doctrine by Paul's sermon at the Areopagus:

Howbeit certain men clave unto him, and believed: among the which was Dionysius the Areopagite, and a woman named Damaris, and others with them.

After his conversion, Dionysius became the first Bishop of Athens, though he is sometimes counted as the second after Hierotheus. He is venerated as a saint in the Catholic and the Eastern Orthodox churches, and is the patron saint of Athens being venerated as the protector of judges and the judiciary. His memory is celebrated on October 3.

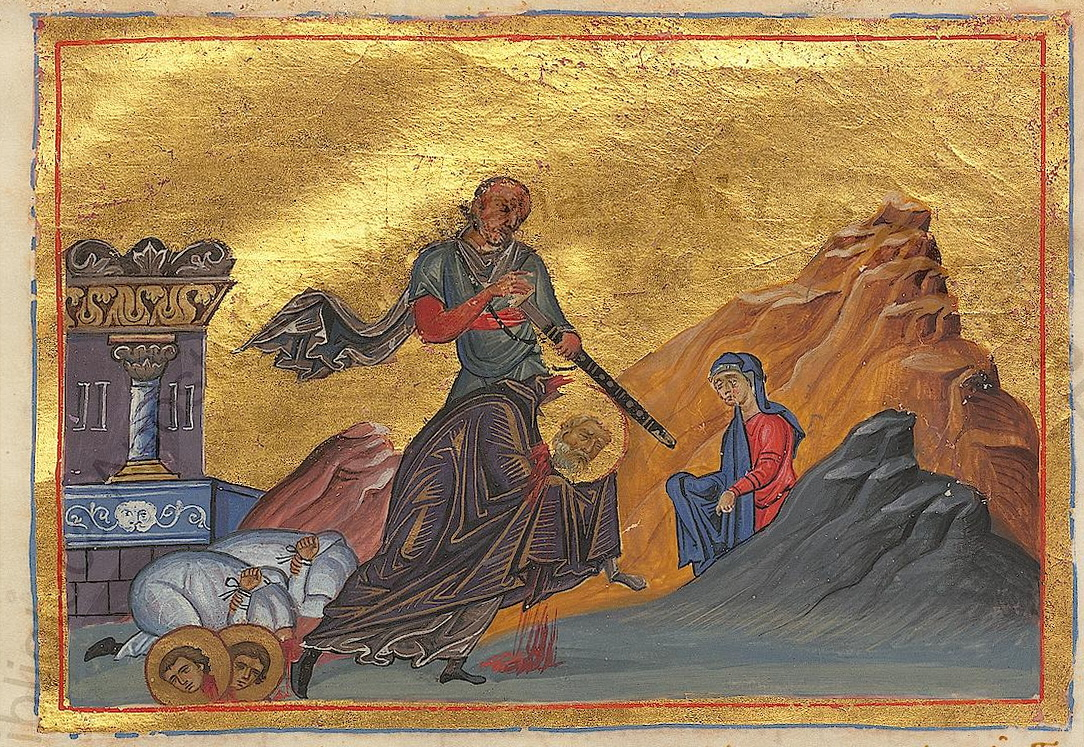
Martyrdom of Saint Dionysios in the Menologion of Basil II (11th Century)

== Historic controversy ==
=== Reception of the Corpus Dionysiacum ===
By the early 6th century, the Corpus Dionysiacum—a collection of four philosophical-theological treatises that "adapted and transformed" Neoplatonic categories into Christian mystical thought, began to be explicitly cited and attributed to Dionysius the Areopagite "by just about all parties in the Christian east" (Chalcedonians, Miaphysites, and Nestorians).

The earliest documented historical appearance of the corpus occurred in 532 AD where followers of Severus of Antioch cited the texts to support Miaphysite Christology. At this meeting, Hypatius of Ephesus had rejected their authenticity arguing that if the writings were truly apostolic, they would have been known to and cited by earlier Church Fathers such as Athanasius and Cyril.

Despite some early doubts, the corpus gained acceptance after the notes of John of Scythopolis, which was further consolidated by Maximus the Confessor. Subsequently, the writings were cited as apostolic authorities at counciles such as Lateran (649), Constantinople III (680–681), and Nicaea II (787), invoking his writings in support of doctrines dealing with Mariology, Christology, and Iconography. Throughout the Middle Ages, Dionysius was appealed to by theologians in both East and West, including John of Damascus, Hilduin of Paris, Photius of Constantinople, and Hugh of Saint Victor. They regularly appealed to Dionysius as a source of theological and mystical insight. The work also ranked among the most frequently cited Patristic authorities by theologians Thomas Aquinas and Gregory Palamas. Apart from minor debates alluded to by Maximus and Photius, the corpus enjoyed virtually uncontested acceptance throughout the late first and early second millennium.

This stability was only disrupted and challenged during the Renaissance and Protestant Reformation. Humanist scholars Lorenzo Valla and Erasmus, along with reformer Martin Luther, mounted the first major challenges to its authenticity and standing, ultimately leading to the prevailing modern academic consensus of pseudonymity by the late-nineteenth century. In 1895, Hugo Koch and Joseph Stiglmayr demonstrated that the Corpus Dionysiacum depended on the works of the 5th-century Neoplatonist Proclus, establishing its composition in the 5th to 6th century.

Hilduin’s 9th-century Passio S. Dionysii mistakenly identified Dionysius with the martyred third-century bishop Dionysius of Paris, a conflation generally rejected by contemporary readers and universally dismissed by modern scholars.

=== Scholarly overview ===
Most scholars adopt a critical view of the writer of the corpus as being Pseudo-Dionysius the Areopagite. Debate within Dionysian scholarship explores possible motives for the fictional attribution—whether as an act of honorific memorialization or strategic deception. The principal argument concerns the writer’s dependence on the language and thought of the fifth-century philosopher Proclus, first demonstrated in articles by Koch and Stiglmayr at the turn of the twentieth century. This position has become so widely accepted that a terminus post quem for the corpus is commonly set at Proclus’ death in 485 AD. Additional evidence cited against authenticity includes a lack of early testimony; the earliest historical mentions since the initial objections having mildly shifted from Pope Gregory I in the late sixth century to Severus of Antioch in the early sixth century. Further grounds for doubt include anachronistic sacramentology, Christology, and liturgiology—notably, implausibly early references to church buildings and Dormition traditions, along with prematurely articulated doctrines of the hypostatic union.

Beyond questions of authorship, the Corpus Dionysiacum exerted a monumental influence on medieval Christian thought. Evelyn Underhill observed regarding its reception history:

Second only to that of St. Augustine was the influence exercised by the strange and nameless writer who chose to ascribe his works to Dionysius the Areopagite [...] From the ninth century to the seventeenth these writings nourished the most spiritual intuitions of men, and possessed an authority which it is now hard to realize. Medieval mysticism is soaked in Dionysian conceptions. Particularly in the fourteenth century, the golden age of mystical literature, the phrase "Dionysius saith" is of continual recurrence: and has for those who use it much the same weight as quotations from the Bible or the great fathers of the Church.

=== Religious defenses of traditional attribution ===
Romanian Orthodox theologian and professor Dumitru Stăniloae, and English translator Reverend John Parker, had argued in favor of a traditional composition date in the late 1st to early 2nd century. Similarly, Evangelos Nikitopoulos and Patrick Craig Truglia argue in Revista Teologică for the corpus having a composition date prior to the 3rd century, basing their case primarily on the text's internal self-identification as Paul's disciple and asserting that pagan Neoplatonists borrowed from early Christian thought. Nikitopoulos also posits that there is a primitive theological vocabulary which aligns with the intellectual profile reconstructed for another second-century Eastern convert with a pagan Greek education, that being Justin Martyr.

== Modern references and legacy ==
In Athens there are two large churches bearing his name, one in Kolonaki on Skoufa Street, while the other is the Catholic Metropolis of Athens, on Panepistimiou Street. The pedestrian walkway around the Acropolis, which passes through the rock of the Areios Pagos, also bears his name.

Dionysius is the patron saint of the Gargaliani of Messenia, as well as in the village of Dionysi in the south of the prefecture of Heraklion. The village was named after him and is the only village of Crete with a church in honor of Saint Dionysios Areopagitis.

== See also ==
- Cathedral Basilica of St. Dionysius the Areopagite (a Roman Catholic church in Athens named after Dionysius the Areopagite)
- Early centers of Christianity#Greece
- Pseudo-Dionysius the Areopagite
- St Dionysius' Church, Market Harborough, UK
- St. Dionysius Institute in Paris

Catholic Church titles
Preceded by New creation or Hierotheos	Bishop of Athens	Succeeded by Narcissus of Athens
