= Aratus =

Greek didactic poet (c. 315/310–240 BC)

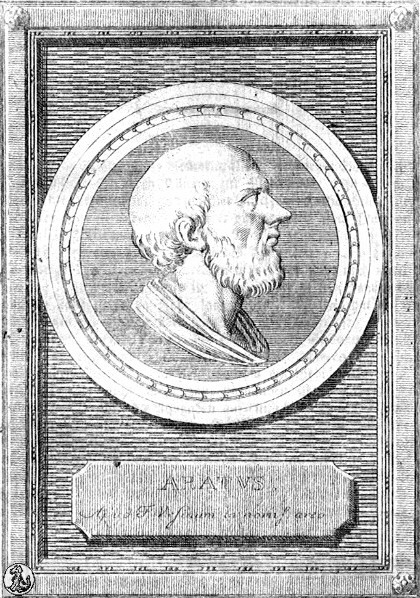
Aratus of Soli

Aratus (/əˈreɪtəs/; Ancient Greek: Ἄρατος ὁ Σολεύς; c. 315/310 – 240 BC) was a Greek didactic poet. His major extant work is his hexameter poem Phenomena (Ancient Greek: Φαινόμενα, Phainómena, "Appearances"; Latin: Phaenomena), the first half of which is a verse setting of a lost work of the same name by Eudoxus of Cnidus. It describes the constellations and other celestial phenomena. The second half is called the Diosemeia (Διοσημεῖα "Forecasts"), and is chiefly about weather lore. Although Aratus was somewhat ignorant of Greek astronomy, his poem was very popular in the Greek and Roman world, as is proven by the large number of commentaries and Latin translations, some of which survive.

== Life ==
There are several accounts of Aratus's life by anonymous Greek writers, and the Suda and Eudocia also mention him. From these it appears that he was a native of Soli in Cilicia (although one authority says Tarsus). He is known to have studied with Menecrates in Ephesus and Philitas in Cos. As a disciple of the Peripatetic philosopher Praxiphanes, in Athens, he met the Stoic philosopher Zeno, as well as Callimachus of Cyrene and Menedemus, the founder of the Eretrian school. He was the son of Athenodoros, and also had a brother with this name.

About 276 BC Aratus was invited to the court of the Macedonian king Antigonus II Gonatas, whose victory over the Gauls in 277 Aratus set to verse. Here he wrote his most famous poem, Phenomena. He then spent some time at the court of Antiochus I Soter of Syria, but subsequently returned to Pella in Macedon, where he died sometime before 240/239. His chief pursuits were medicine (which is also said to have been his profession), grammar, and philosophy.

== Writings ==
Several poetical works on various subjects, as well as a number of prose epistles, are attributed to Aratus, but none of them have come down to us, except his two astronomical poems in hexameter. These have generally been joined as parts of the same work; but they seem to be distinct poems, the first, called Phenomena ("Appearances"), consists of 732 verses; the second, Diosemeia ("On Weather Signs"), of 422 verses.

=== Phenomena ===
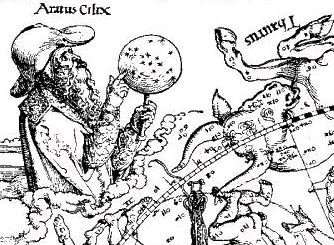
Aratus and star-signs

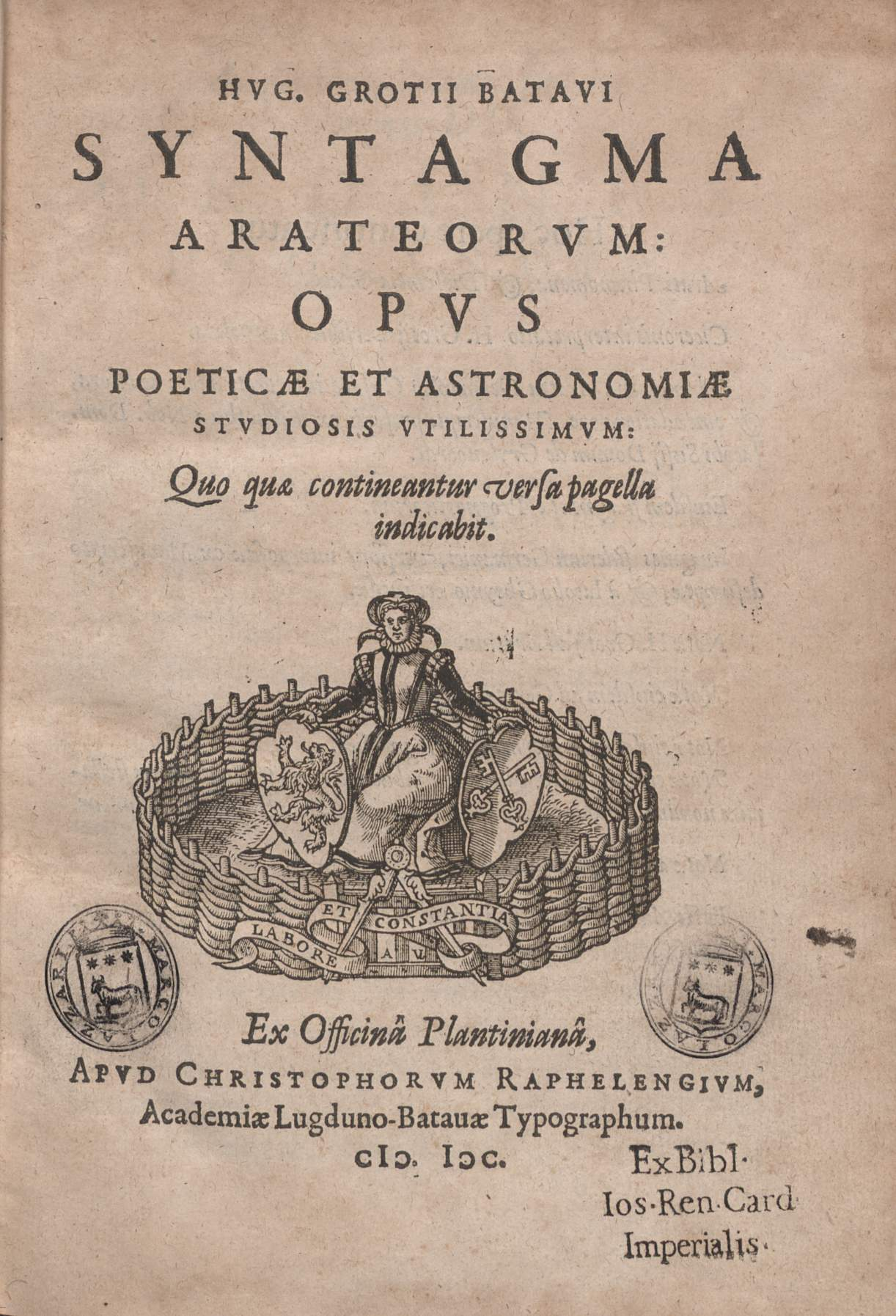
Phenomena

The Phenomena appears to be based on two prose works—Phenomena and Enoptron (Ἔνοπτρον, "Mirror", presumably a descriptive image of the heavens)—by Eudoxus of Cnidus, written about a century earlier. We are told by the biographers of Aratus that it was the desire of Antigonus to have them turned into verse, which gave rise to the Phenomena of Aratus; and it appears from the fragments of them preserved by Hipparchus, that Aratus has in fact versified, or closely imitated parts of them both, but especially of the first.

The purpose of the Phenomena is to give an introduction to the constellations, with the rules for their risings and settings; and of the circles of the sphere, amongst which the Milky Way is reckoned. The positions of the constellations, north of the ecliptic, are described by reference to the principal groups surrounding the north pole (Ursa Major, Ursa Minor, Draco, and Cepheus), whilst Orion serves as a point of departure for those to the south. The immobility of the Earth, and the revolution of the sky about a fixed axis are maintained; the path of the Sun in the zodiac is described; but the planets are introduced merely as bodies having a motion of their own, without any attempt to define their periods; nor is anything said about the Moon's orbit. The opening of the poem asserts the dependence of all things upon Zeus.

From the lack of precision in the descriptions, it would seem that Aratus was neither a mathematician nor observer or, at any rate, that in this work he did not aim at scientific accuracy. He not only represents the configurations of particular groups incorrectly, but describes some phenomena which are inconsistent with any one supposed latitude of the spectator, and others which could not coexist at any one epoch. These errors are partly to be attributed to Eudoxus himself, and partly to the way in which Aratus has used the materials supplied by him. Hipparchus (about a century later), who was a scientific astronomer and observer, has left a commentary upon the Phenomenas of Eudoxus and Aratus, accompanied by the discrepancies which he had noticed between his own observations and their descriptions.

==== Published editions ====
- Phaenomena (in Latin). Leiden: Officina Plantiniana. 1600.

=== Diosemeia ===
The Diosemeia consists of forecasts of the weather from astronomical phenomena, with an account of its effects upon animals. It appears to be an imitation of Hesiod, and to have been imitated by Virgil in some parts of the Georgics. The materials are said to be taken almost wholly from Aristotle's Meteorologica, from the work of Theophrastus, On Weather Signs, and from Hesiod. Nothing is said in either poem about Hellenistic astrology.

=== Works attributed to Aratus in the Suda ===
The Suda preserves a catalogue of works attributed to Aratus, but modern scholars caution that some titles may represent subdivisions of larger works and that the boundaries between individual works are sometimes uncertain.

Below is the list:

- Phainomena (τὰ Φαινόμενα)
- Hymns to Pan (ὕμνους εἰς Πᾶνα)
- Spondophoroi (Σπονδοφόροι)
- Paignia (Παίγνια)
- Astrologia (Ἀστρολογία)
- Astrothesia (Ἀστροθεσία)
- Synthesis Pharmakon (Σύνθεσιν φαρμάκων)
- Theriakon Epitedeia (Θηριακῶν ἐπιτήδεια)
- Anthropogonia (Ἀνθρωπογονίαν)
- Epithytikon (Ἐπιθυτικόν)
- To Theopropos (εἰς Θεόπροπον)
- To Antigonus (εἰς Ἀντίγονον)
- Ethopoeiae (Ἠθοποιΐα)
- Letters (ἐπιστολάς)
- Epigrams (ἐπιγράμματα)
- To Phila (εἰς Φίλαν)
- Anatomy (Ἀνατομή)
- To Pausanias the Macedonian (εἰς Παυσανίαν τὸν Μακεδόνα
- Lament for Kleombrotos (Ἐπικήδειον τὸν Κλεομβρότου)
- Correction/Edition of the Odyssey (Διόρθωσιν Ὀδυσσείας)
- Prose Letters (ἐπιστολὰς ὁμοίως καταλογάδην)

== Later influence ==
The two poems were very popular both in the Greek and Roman world, as is proved by the number of commentaries and Latin translations. He enjoyed immense prestige among Hellenistic poets, including Theocritus, Callimachus and Leonidas of Tarentum. This assessment was picked up by Latin poets, including Ovid and Virgil. Latin versions were made by none other than Cicero (mostly extant), Ovid (only two short fragments remain), the member of the imperial Julio-Claudian dynasty Germanicus (extant, with scholia), and the less-famous Avienius (extant). Quintilian was less enthusiastic.

Aratus was also cited by the author of Acts Luke the Evangelist, in Acts 17:28, where he relates Saint Paul's address on the Areopagus. Paul, speaking of God, quotes the fifth line of Aratus's Phenomena (Epimenides seems to be the source of the first part of Acts 17:28, although this is less clear):

Ἐκ Διὸς ἀρχώμεσθα, τὸν οὐδέποτ' ἄνδρες ἐῶμεν
ἄρρητον· μεσταὶ δὲ Διὸς πᾶσαι μὲν ἀγυιαί,
πᾶσαι δ' ἀνθρώπων ἀγοραί, μεστὴ δὲ θάλασσα
καὶ λιμένες· πάντη δὲ Διὸς κεχρήμεθα πάντες.
τοῦ γὰρ καὶ γένος εἰμέν. κτλ.

— Phenomena 1–5
Translation:

Let us begin with Zeus, whom we mortals never leave unspoken.
For every street, every market-place is full of Zeus.
Even the sea and the harbour are full of this deity.
Everywhere everyone is indebted to Zeus.
For we are indeed his offspring ...

Authors of twenty-seven commentaries are known; ones by Theon of Alexandria, Achilles Tatius and Hipparchus of Nicaea survive. An Arabic translation was commissioned in the ninth century by the Caliph Al-Ma'mun. He is cited by Vitruvius, Stephanus of Byzantium and Stobaeus. Several accounts of his life are extant, by anonymous Greek writers.

The crater Aratus on the Moon and the minor planet 12152 Aratus are named in his honour.

== See also ==
- The Hesiodic Astronomia
- Leiden Aratea
