= Bereans =

Religious group at the time of Paul

In ancient times, the Bereans were the inhabitants of the city of Berea, also referred to as Beroea in the Bible. Today, the city is known as Veria in what is today northern Greece. The name has been taken up by certain groups within Protestantism based on the Bereans' emphasis on apologetics and studying Scripture.

== Biblical context ==
According to the Book of Acts, Paul of Tarsus and Silas preached at the synagogue in Berea, and many of the people there believed.

== Modern use ==
Historically, the Bereans (also called Beroeans, Barclayans or Barclayites) were a Protestant sect following former Scottish Presbyterian minister John Barclay (1734–1798). Founded in Edinburgh in 1773, the Berean Church followed a modified form of Calvinism. It had congregations in Scotland, London, and Bristol, but mainly merged with the Congregationalists after Barclay's death in 1798.

A new Protestant Christian group began in the 1850s in the United States under the tutelage of Dr. John Thomas. The name "Christadelphian" was chosen as it is believed that those who believe and obey the Commandments of Christ and the Bible as the inspired word of God, are "Brethren in Christ". The original group split, with one group continuing with the name "The Christadelphians" and the second group adding the word "Berean" to become the "Berean Christadelphians". The word "Berean" was chosen to reflect the words in Acts 17, "These (Berea) were more noble than those in Thessalonica in that they received the word with all readiness of mind and searched the scriptures daily whether those things were so."

Christadelphians, and Berean Christadelphians believe in the promises given to Abraham, Isaac, and Jacob concerning the Kingdom of God. They deny the Doctrine of the Trinity, a central tenet of orthodox Christianity, and this refusal to recognize the triune nature of God has resulted in a major impasse between the Christadelphians and the Protestant, Catholic, and Eastern Orthodox churches.

Some groups among the Bible Student movement also adopted the name, such as the Berean Bible Students and the Berean Bible Institute. Churches and institutions who adopt the Berean name, usually do so in order to express their desire to reflect the attitude of the Bereans in Acts 17, committing themselves to "searching the scriptures daily".
