= Beroea =

Ancient city and archaeological site in Macedonia

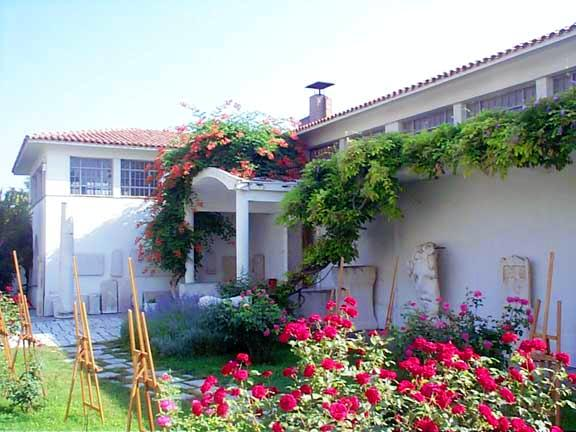
- Archaeological Museum of Veria
- Interactive map of Beroea

Beroea (Ancient Greek: Βέροια, romanized: Béroia, also transcribed as Berea) was an ancient city of the Hellenistic period and Roman Empire now known as Veria (or Veroia) in Macedonia, Northern Greece. It is a small city on the eastern side of the Vermio Mountains north of Mount Olympus. The capital, or headquarters, of the Macedonian koinon was the city of Beroia. The town is mentioned in the Acts of the Apostles as a place in which the apostles Paul, Silas and Timothy preached the Christian Gospel.

== Location ==
Berea was in central Macedonia. The city's foundation stood where Veria, or Kar-Verria, in Greece is today. In its unique position, it had a variety of terrain surrounding the city since then.

Berea sat at the base of Mount Bermius, which is part of the Vermio Mountains and provides an ample supply of water for the city and the region. The main sources of water were the Haliacmon and Axios Rivers, which supported apple, peach and pear orchards. The area is prosperous with a hydroelectric dam on the Haliacmon powering the area's industrial sector.

== History ==
The city is reputed to have been named by its mythical founder Beres (also spelled Pheres) or from the daughter of the king of Berroia, who was thought to be the son of Macedon.

A city of the same name that is mentioned in a section of Thucydides's history, which dates it to be around 432 BC. In Polybius's history there were two insertions about an inscription that dates the city back to the later part of the 4th century BC. No one has verified the historical date of the establishment of the city although it has been known to have been surrendered to the Romans from the Macedonians after the Battle of Pydna in 168 BC.

Veria enjoyed great prosperity under the kings of the Argead Dynasty, whose most famous member was Alexander the Great, who made it their second-most important city after Pella. Veria reached the height of its glory and influence in the Hellenistic period, during the reign of the Antigonid Dynasty. During that time, Veria became the seat of the Koinon of Macedonians (Κοινόν Μακεδόνων), minted its own coinage and held sports games named Alexandreia in honour of Alexander the Great, with athletes from all over Greece competing in them.

The city was the first city of the Macedonian region to fall to the Roman Empire, after the Battle of Pydna in 168 BC. In the 1st, century there were two major roads joining the towns of Thessalonica and Beroea, one of them passing close to the ancient city of Pella. There are some assumptions that the Apostle Paul used that route when he visited Beroea.

Within the city there was a Jewish settlement in which Paul, after he had left Thessalonica, and his companion, Silas, preached to the Jewish and Greek communities of the city in AD 50/51 or 54/55.

In the 7th century, the Slavic tribe of the Drougoubitai raided the lowlands below the city, and in the late-8th century, Empress Irene of Athens is said to have rebuilt and expanded the city and named it Irenopolis after herself, but some sources place that Berrhoea-Irenopolis further east. For subsequent history, see History of Veria.

== New Testament references ==
Paul, Silas, and Timothy traveled to Beroea by night after fleeing from Thessalonica, as recorded in Acts 17:10. They 'immediately' went to the synagogue to preach, and the Beroeans were accepting; the writer of the Acts of the Apostles noted the difference between the Thessalonians' response to the gospel and the Beroeans' response: the Beroeans were 'open-minded' or 'fair-minded' and willing to 'examine the scriptures to see if Paul and Silas were teaching the truth'. Many of the Beroeans believed, both men and women, but when the Jewish Thessalonian non-believers heard about that, they came to Beroea; stirred up crowds; started riots and ensured that Paul, Silas, and Timothy could not preach. Then, the believers sent Paul to the coast while Timothy and Silas stayed behind. Paul was taken to Athens, and word was given to Timothy and Silas to join him as soon as possible. (Acts 17:10–15)

Paul and Silas ministered to the Jewish community of Beroea around 54 and 55 A.D. The two men had been driven out of the city of Thessalonica by an angry mob for spreading the gospel there. Paul and Silas made their journey from Thessalonica to Beroea by night (Acts 17:10). It is also said that Timothy, a student of Paul, joined him during the journey to Beroea. The people of Beroea were more accepting than the people of Thessalonica of the message from the Apostle and his companions. The community was said to consider carefully what they learned from Paul before truly believing it (Acts 17:11–12).

After Paul, Silas and the other members of their group had spent several days in Beroea, some Jews from Thessalonica got word that Paul and Silas were preaching in Beroea and stirred up trouble, and Paul was again forced to leave. Some members of the congregation helped Paul to get to Athens, but Silas and Timothy stayed in Beroea, then later caught up with Paul in the city of Corinth (Acts 18:5). Later, Sopater of Berea joined Paul on his journey (Acts 20:4). It is said that Sopater was ordered by a delegation from Beroea to go to Judea with funds that would help the needy of that region.

== Bishopric ==
A bishopric at Beroea goes back to the New Testament. The former diocese of the ancient city of Beroea was within the Roman province of Macedonia, in today's northern Greece. Presently the diocese is part of the ecclesiastical province of Thessaloniki. The Roman Catholic episcopal see of Berrhoea, centred on northern Greece, is today a vacant titular see.

=== History ===
Onesimus, formerly Philemon's slave, was its first bishop according to the Apostolic Constitutions (VII, 46). Known bishops attended ecclesiastical councils: Gerontius took part in the Council of Sardica (c. 344), Lucas in the Second Council of Ephesus (449), Sebastian in the Council of Chalcedon (451), Timothy in the synod convoked by the patriarch Menas of Constantinople in 536, and Joseph in the Fourth Council of Constantinople (869) that condemned Photius.

The Byzantine emperor Michael VIII Palaiologos promoted the local see to an archbishopric after 1261, and it advanced further to the rank of a metropolitan see by 1300. Berrhoea is listed by the Roman Catholic Church as a titular see.

At the time of the last partition of the empire, it was allotted to Macedonia Prima, and its see made suffragan to Thessalonica.

Under Andronicus II (1283–1328) Beroea was made a metropolis.

The Greek metropolitans added the title of Naoussa, a neighbouring city. It has about 10,000 inhabitants.

=== Known bishops ===
Amongst its bishops were:

- The Biblical Onesimus
- Gerontius was present at Council of Serdica in 344
- Luke at the Second Council of Ephesus in 449
- Timothy at the Council of Constantinople under the Patriarch Menas in 536,
- Joseph at the Fourth Council of Constantinople in 869
- un-named Catholic bishop in 1235

=== Catholic titular bishops of Berrhoea ===
- Alfredo Ottaviani (April 5, 1962 – April 19, 1962 )
- Pierre-Auguste-Marie-Joseph Douillard (May 22, 1963 – August 20, 1963)
- Friedrich Kaiser Depel (October 29, 1963 – September 26, 1993)

== See also ==
- Acts 17, Acts 18, Acts 20
- Aigai
- Pella
- Berea College
