= Epimenides =

7th/6th-century BCE Greek seer, philosopher, and poet

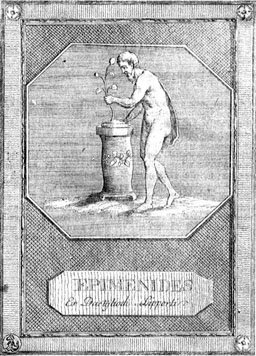
Epimenides of Knossos

Epimenides of Crete (/ɛpɪˈmɛnɪdiːz/; Ancient Greek: Ἐπιμενίδης) was a semi-mythical 7th- or 6th-century BC Greek seer and philosopher-poet, from Knossos or Phaistos.

== Life ==
While tending his father's sheep, Epimenides is said to have fallen asleep for fifty-seven years in a Cretan cave sacred to Zeus, after which he reportedly awoke with the gift of prophecy (Diogenes Laërtius i. 109–115). Diogenes Laërtius relates that when a pestilence raged in Athens, the Pythonic oracle told the Athenians to bring Epimenides from Crete to give advice. When he came, he set sheep on Mars Hill and where they lay down had altars erected "to the suitable god", explaining the existence of these anonymous altars. One of these was apparently mentioned by Saint Paul in his speech on that hill (Acts 17). Plutarch writes that Epimenides purified Athens after the pollution brought by the Alcmeonidae, and that the seer's expertise in sacrifices and reform of funeral practices were of great help to Solon in his reform of the Athenian state. The only reward he would accept was a branch of the sacred olive, and a promise of perpetual friendship between Athens and Knossos (Plutarch, Life of Solon, 12; Aristotle, Ath. Pol. 1).

Athenaeus also mentions him, in connection with the self-sacrifice of the erastes and eromenos pair of Aristodemus and Cratinus, who were believed to have given their lives in order to purify Athens. Even in antiquity there were those who held the story to be mere fiction (The Deipnosophists, XIII. 78–79). Diogenes Laërtius preserves a number of spurious letters between Epimenides and Solon in his Lives of the Philosophers. Epimenides was also said to have prophesied at Sparta on military matters.

He died in Crete at an advanced age; according to his countrymen, who afterwards honoured him as a god, he lived nearly three hundred years. According to another story, he was taken prisoner in a war between the Spartans and Knossians, and put to death by his captors, because he refused to prophesy favourably for them. Pausanias reports that when Epimenides died, his skin was found to be covered with tattooed writing. This was considered odd, because the Greeks reserved tattooing for slaves. Some modern scholars have seen this as evidence that Epimenides was heir to the shamanic religions of Central Asia, because tattooing is often associated with shamanic initiation. The skin of Epimenides was preserved at the courts of the ephores in Sparta, conceivably as a good-luck charm.

According to Diogenes Laërtius, Epimenides met Pythagoras in Crete, and they went to the Cave of Ida.

== Works ==
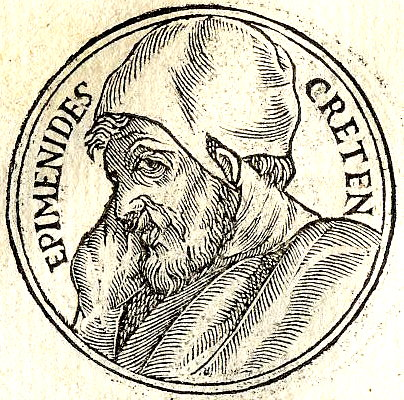
Epimenides from "Promptuarii Iconum Insigniorum"

Several prose and poetic works, now lost, were attributed to Epimenides, including a theogony, an epic poem on the Argonautic expedition, prose works on purifications and sacrifices, a cosmogony, oracles, a work on the laws of Crete, and a treatise on Minos and Rhadymanthus.

=== Cretica ===
Epimenides' Cretica (Κρητικά) is apparently quoted twice in the New Testament. Prof. James Rendel Harris found a passage in a Nestorian Scriptural commentary in Syriac, quite possibly written by Theodore of Mopsuestia, on Acts 17:28 saying:

"In Him we live and move and have our being." The Cretans used to say of Zeus, that he was a prince and was ripped up by a wild boar, and he was buried : and lo ! his grave is with us. Accordingly Minos, the son of Zeus, made over him a panegyric and in it he said : "A grave have fashioned for thee, O holy and high One, the lying Kretans, who are all the time liars, evil beasts, idle bellies; but thou diest not, for to eternity thou livest, and standest; for in thee we live and move and have our being."

Rendel Harris argued that this was in fact based on the poem of Epimenides, and that therefore both the phrase "in Him we live and move and have our being" in Acts and the phrase "Cretans, always liars..." in Titus are based on Epimenides. He offered the following suggestion for the original Greek:

J. Rendel Harris' hypothetical Greek text:

Τύμβον ἐτεκτήναντο σέθεν, κύδιστε μέγιστε,
Κρῆτες, ἀεὶ ψευδεῖς, κακὰ θηρία, γαστέρες ἀργαί.
Ἀλλὰ σύ γ᾽ οὐ θνῄσκεις, ἕστηκας γὰρ ζοὸς αἰεί,
Ἐν γὰρ σοὶ ζῶμεν καὶ κινύμεθ᾽ ἠδὲ καὶ ἐσμέν.

Translation:

They fashioned a tomb for you, holy and high one,
Cretans, always liars, evil beasts, idle bellies.
But you are not dead: you live and abide forever,
For in you we live and move and have our being.

The "lie" of the Cretans is that Zeus was mortal; Epimenides considered Zeus immortal. "Cretans, always liars," with the same theological intent as Epimenides, also appears in the Hymn to Zeus of Callimachus. The fourth line is quoted (with a reference to one of "your own poets") in Acts of the Apostles, chapter 17, verse 28.

The second line is quoted, with a veiled attribution ("a prophet of their own"), in the Epistle to Titus, chapter 1, verse 12, to warn Titus about the Cretans. The "prophet" in Titus 1:12 is identified by Clement of Alexandria as "Epimenides" (Stromata, i. 14). In this passage, Clement mentions that "some say" Epimenides should be counted among the seven wisest philosophers.

Chrysostom (Homily 3 on Titus) gives an alternative fragment:

For even a tomb, King, of you
They made, who never died, but ever shall be.

== Epimenides paradox ==
The Epimenides paradox refers to a saying attributed to Epimenides: "Cretans are always liars" («Κρῆτες ἀεὶ ψεῦσται»). This statement creates a paradox of self-reference similar to the liar paradox. This quote is referenced in the New Testament Epistle to Titus, which indirectly alludes to Epimenides as a "prophet" of the Cretans.

== See also ==
- Non-canonical books referenced in the Bible
