= Minuscule 876 =

- New Testament manuscript
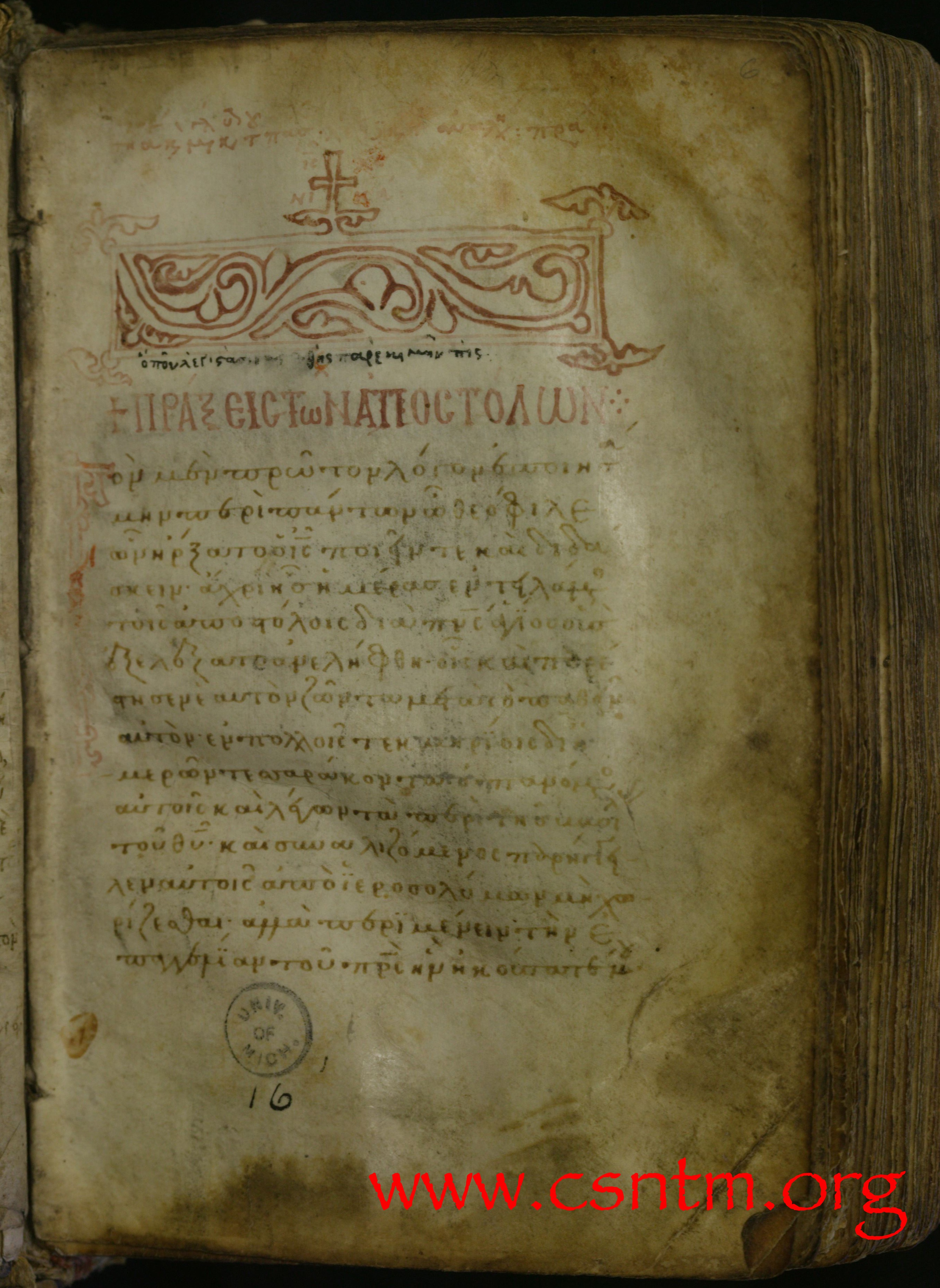
- Folio 4 recto
- Text: Acts, Catholic epistles, Pauline epistles
- Date: 12th century
- Script: Greek
- Now at: University of Michigan
- Size: 15.5cm by 11cm
- Type: Byzantine text-type
- Category: none

Minuscule 876 (in the Gregory-Aland numbering) α 356 (Soden). It is a Greek minuscule manuscript of the New Testament, on 282 parchment leaves (15.5 cm by 11 cm). It is dated paleographically to the 12th century. Formerly it was labelled by 224^{a} and 279^{p}. Scrivener labelled it by 221^{a}.

== Description ==
The codex contains the text of the Acts of the Apostles, Catholic epistles, and Pauline epistles. The text is written in one column per page, 20 lines per page in minuscule letters. It contains some interesting lectionary markings at the margin, subscriptions at the end of each sacred book, numbers of Ancient Greek: στιχοι, and images. The text of Hebrews 10:15-11:7 was supplied by a later hand on the paper.

The Greek text of the codex is a representative of the Byzantine text-type. Aland did not place it in any Category.

== History ==
The manuscript was purchased by Baroness Burdett-Coutts (1814–1906), a philanthropist, along with other Greek manuscripts (among them Lectionary 214-227). The manuscript was presented by Burdett-Coutts to Sir Roger Cholmely's School, and was housed at the Highgate (Burdett-Coutts III. 37), in London. C. R. Gregory saw it in 1886. Formerly it was labelled by 224^{a} and 279^{p}. In 1908 Gregory gave the number 876 to it.

In 1922 it was acquired for the University of Michigan. The manuscript was described by K. W. Clark.

The codex is housed in University of Michigan (Ms. 16), in Ann Arbor.

== See also ==
- List of New Testament minuscules
- Textual criticism
