= John Mark =

Biblical saint

Saint John Mark
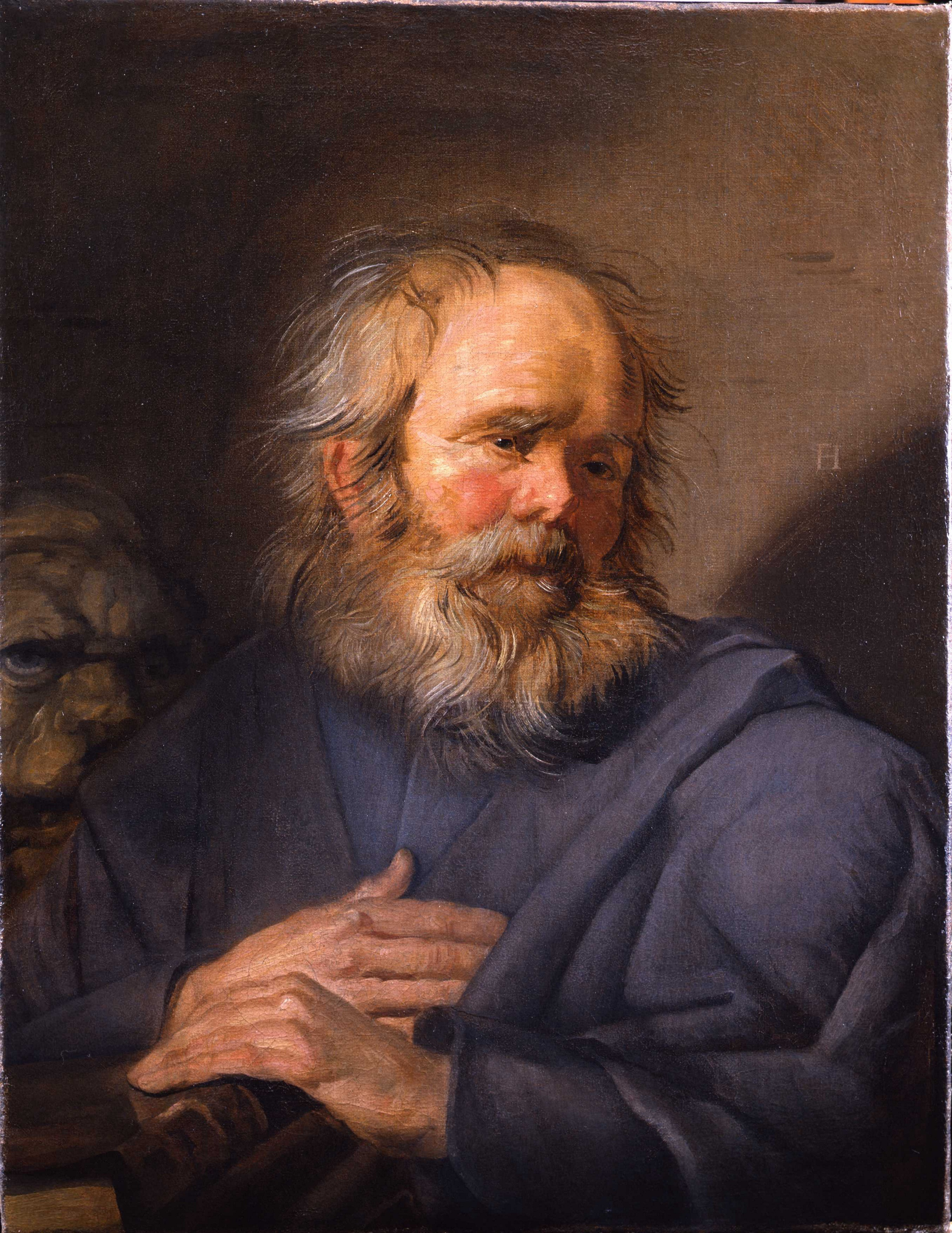
- St. Mark by Frans Hals, c. 1625

Apostle of the Seventy, Bishop of Byblos
- Died: First century AD
- Venerated in: Eastern Orthodox Church; Roman Catholic Church; Eastern Catholic Churches
- Feast: September 27

John Mark (Greek: Ἰωάννης Μᾶρκος, romanized: Iōannēs Markos) is named in the Acts of the Apostles as an assistant accompanying Paul and Barnabas on their missionary journeys. Traditionally he is regarded as identical with Mark the Evangelist, the traditional writer of the Gospel of Mark.

== Biblical account ==
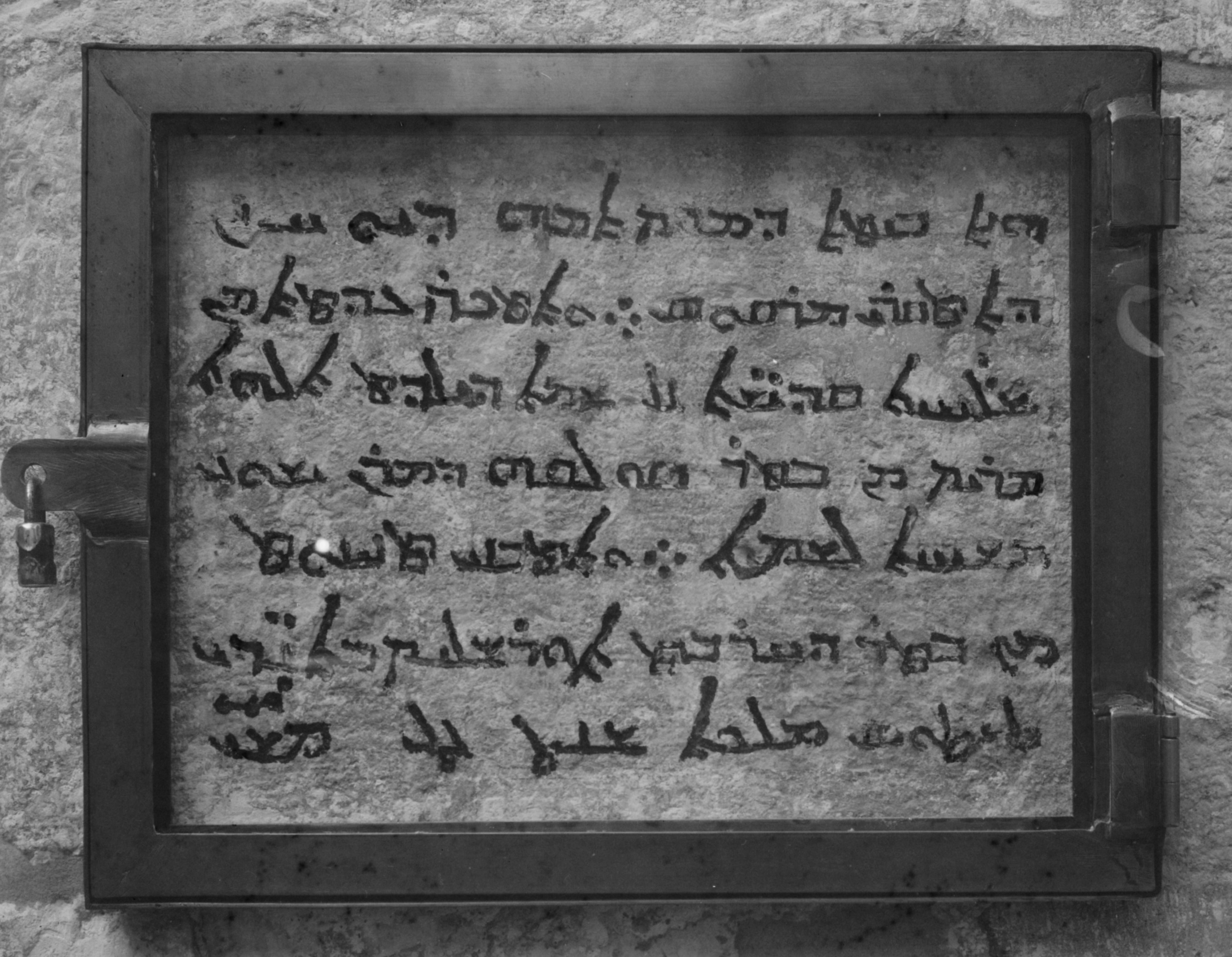
6th-century Syriac inscription at the Monastery of Saint Mark in the Old City of Jerusalem, stating: "This is the house of Mary, mother of John Mark."

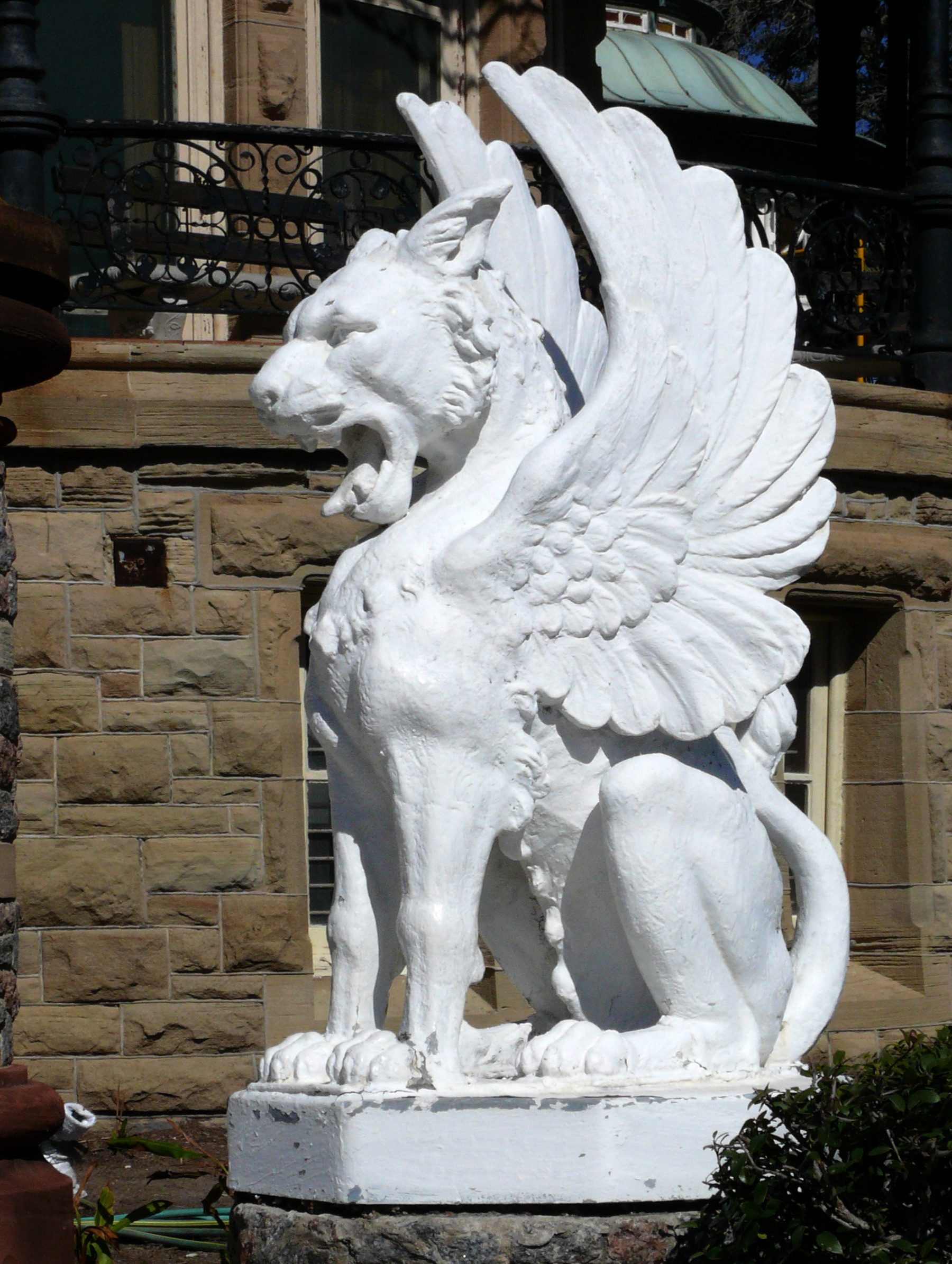
Lion of St Mark outside Bishop's Palace – Galveston, Texas

Several times the Acts of the Apostles mentions a certain "John, who was also called Mark" or simply "John":

And when [Peter] had considered the thing, he came to the house of Mary the mother of John, whose surname was Mark; where many were gathered together praying.^{Acts 12:12}

And Barnabas and Saul returned from Jerusalem, when they had fulfilled their ministry, and took with them John, whose surname was Mark.^{Acts 12:25}

And when they were at Salamis, they preached the word of God in the synagogues of the Jews: and they had John to their minister.

Now when Paul and his company loosed from Paphos, they came to Perga in Pamphylia: and John departing from them returned to Jerusalem.

And Barnabas determined to take with them John, whose surname was Mark.

But Paul thought not good to take him with them, who departed from them from Pamphylia, and went not with them to the work.

And the contention was so sharp between them, that they departed asunder one from the other: and so Barnabas took Mark, and sailed unto Cyprus;

And Paul chose Silas, and departed, being recommended by the brethren unto the Grace of God.

From these passages it may be gathered that John's mother Mary had a large house in Jerusalem to which Peter fled after escaping prison; that John assisted Paul and Barnabas on their first missionary journey to Cyprus and as far as Perga in Pamphylia, but then returned to Jerusalem; and that later controversy over receiving John Mark back led to Paul and Barnabas parting ways, with Barnabas taking Mark back to Cyprus and both thereafter disappearing from the narrative of Acts. The reasons for John Mark's departure to Jerusalem and the subsequent disagreement between Paul and Barnabas have been subject to much speculation. Matthew Henry, for example, suggested that John Mark had departed "without [Barnabas and Paul's] knowledge, or without their consent". However, there is simply too little data to regard any explanation with confidence.

Some scholars have argued that John Mark's negative portrayal in Acts is a polemic against the presumptive author of the Gospel of Mark, Luke's primary source for his own Gospel. Adela Collins suggests, "Since the author of Acts also wrote the Gospel according to Luke, it could be that this critical portrait was intended to undercut the authority of the second Gospel." Michael Kok notes that "Mark's Gospel was a bit of an embarrassment to the refined literary and theological tastes of an educated Christian like Luke."

== Identification ==
It was common for Jews of the period to bear both a Semitic name such as John (Hebrew: Yochanan) and a Greco-Roman name such as Mark (Latin: Marcus). But since John was one of the most common names among Judean Jews, and Mark was the most common in the Roman world, caution is warranted in identifying John Mark with any other John or Mark.

Ancient sources, in fact, consistently distinguish John Mark from the other Marks of the New Testament and style him Bishop of Byblos. Neither was John Mark identified in antiquity with any other John, apart from rare and explicit speculation.

Medieval sources, on the other hand, increasingly regarded all New Testament references to Mark as Mark the Evangelist, and many modern scholars have agreed in seeing a single Mark. The very fact that various writings could refer simply to Mark without further qualification has been seen as pointing to a single Mark.

First, there is Mark the cousin of Barnabas, mentioned by Paul as a "fellow worker" in the closings of three Pauline epistles. In antiquity he was regarded as a distinct Mark, Bishop of Apollonia. If, on the other hand, these two Marks are to be identified, the fact that these epistles were written after the departure of John Mark with Barnabas in Acts must suppose some later reconciliation. But a majority of scholars, noting the close association of both Marks with Paul and Barnabas, indeed regard them as likely the same person. Biblical scholars Samuel Rolles Driver and Charles Augustus Briggs identified Mark, the cousin of Barnabas, with John Mark, as do John R. Donahue and Daniel J. Harrington.

Mark the Evangelist, however, is known only from the patristic tradition, which associates him only with Peter and makes no mention of Paul. Jerome alone suggests that the Mark of whom Paul speaks may be the Evangelist. But modern scholars have noted that as Peter fled to the house of John Mark's mother, the two men may have had a longstanding association.

A minority of modern scholars have argued, on the other hand, for identifying John the Evangelist or John the Elder with John Mark.

== Later sources ==
The Acts of Barnabas, apparently an apocryphal work of the 5th century, purports to be written by John Mark and to detail the missionary journey and martyrdom of Barnabas in Cyprus, thus picking up where the account of Acts leaves off.

The Encomium of the Apostle St. Barnabas, written by Alexander the Monk in the 6th century, also gives an extensive account of the activity of Barnabas and John Mark in Cyprus. After the death of Barnabas, John Mark leaves for Ephesus, and the account then continues by identifying him with Mark the Evangelist.
