= Lectionary 314 =

Lectionary ℓ 314
- New Testament manuscript
- Text: Evangelistarium †
- Date: 12th-century
- Script: Greek
- Found: 1864
- Now at: Brown University
- Size: 33 cm by 26 cm
- Type: Byzantine text-type

Lectionary 314 (Gregory-Aland), designated by siglum ℓ 314 (in the Gregory-Aland numbering) is a Greek manuscript of the New Testament, on parchment. Palaeographically it has been assigned to the 12th century. The manuscript has survived in a fragmentary condition.

== Description ==
The codex contains Lessons from the Gospels of lectionary (Evangelistarium). It is written in Greek minuscule letters, on two parchment leaves (33 cm by 26 cm), 2 columns per page, 21 lines per page.

== History ==
Gregory dated the manuscript to the 12th century. It has been assigned by the Institute for New Testament Textual Research (INTF) to the 12th century.

Of the history of the codex ℓ 314 nothing is known until the year 1864, when it was in the possession of a dealer at Janina in Epeiros. It was then purchased from him by a representative of Baroness Burdett-Coutts (1814–1906), a philanthropist, together with other Greek manuscripts (among them lectionaries ℓ 313 and ℓ 315). They were transported to England in 1870–1871.

The manuscript was added to the list of New Testament manuscripts by F. H. A. Scrivener (495) Caspar René Gregory (number 314^{e}).

It used to be held in London (Burdett-Coutts II. 14). The codex is now housed in the library of the Brown University (Koopmann Collect. B X 360) in Providence, Rhode Island.

The manuscript is not cited in critical editions of the Greek New Testament (UBS4, NA28).

== See also ==
- List of New Testament lectionaries
- Biblical manuscript
- Textual criticism
- Lectionary 228

== Bibliography ==
- Gregory, Caspar René (1900). Textkritik des Neuen Testaments. Vol. 1. Leipzig: J.C. Hinrichs’sche Buchhandlung. p. 414.
