= Lectionary 313 =

Lectionary ℓ 313
- New Testament manuscript
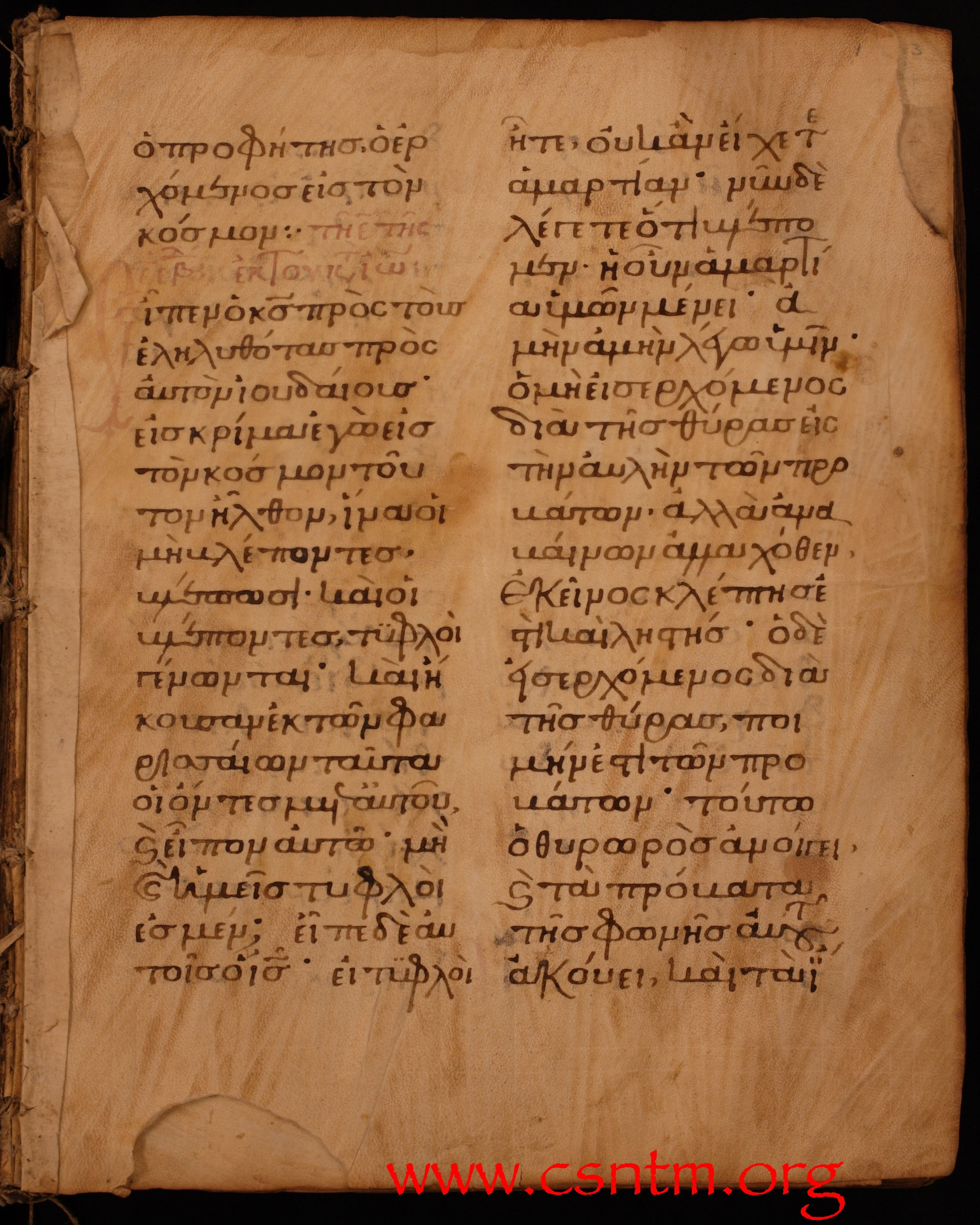
- folio 1 recto of the codex
- Text: Evangelistarium †
- Date: 14th-century
- Script: Greek
- Found: 1864
- Now at: University of Michigan Library
- Size: 34.5 cm by 28 cm
- Type: Byzantine text-type

Lectionary 313 (Gregory-Aland), designated by siglum ℓ 313 (in the Gregory-Aland numbering) is a Greek manuscript of the New Testament, on parchment. Palaeographically it has been assigned to the 14th-century. The manuscript has survived in a fragmentary condition.

== Description ==
The codex contains Lessons for selected days only from the Gospels of John, Matthew, Luke lectionary (Evangelistarium) with some lacunae. It is written in Greek minuscule letters, on 209 parchment leaves (34.5 cm by 28 cm), 2 columns per page, 21 lines per page. According to the CSNTM description the manuscript has 212 leaves. There are no interesting or significant images.

The codex contains the weekday Gospel Lessons (Evangelistarium) according to the Byzantine Church order.

== History ==
Gregory dated the manuscript to the 14th-century. It has been assigned by the Institute for New Testament Textual Research (INTF) to the 14th-century.

Of the history of the codex ℓ 313 nothing is known until 1864, when it was in the possession of a dealer at Janina in Epeiros. It was then purchased from him by a representative of Baroness Burdett-Coutts (1814–1906), a philanthropist, together with other Greek manuscripts (among them lectionaries ℓ 314 and ℓ 315) which were transported to England in 1870–1871.

The manuscript was added to the list of New Testament manuscripts by F. H. A. Scrivener (494) Caspar René Gregory (number 313^{e}).

It used to be held in London (Burdett-Coutts II. 5). The codex is now housed in the University of Michigan Library (Ms. 33) in Ann Arbor.

The manuscript is not cited in critical editions of the Greek New Testament (UBS4, NA28).

== See also ==
- List of New Testament lectionaries
- Biblical manuscript
- Textual criticism
- Lectionary 228

== Bibliography ==
- Gregory, Caspar René (1900). Textkritik des Neuen Testaments. Vol. 1. Leipzig: J.C. Hinrichs’sche Buchhandlung. p. 414.
