= Mark the cousin of Barnabas =

Character in the New Testament, usually identified with John Mark

Mark the cousin of Barnabas is a figure mentioned in the New Testament, usually identified with John Mark (and thus with Mark the Evangelist).

== Biblical record ==
Mark accompanied Barnabas and Paul on their missionary travels. Mark started with them on their first trip, but left them partway through. Later, when planning their second trip, Barnabas and Paul could not agree about whether Mark should accompany them again, so Barnabas and Mark separated from Paul.

Later, Paul appears to have been reconciled to Mark, for he mentions him positively in Colossians 4:10: "Aristarchus, my fellow prisoner, sends you his greetings; and also Barnabas's cousin Mark (about whom you received instructions; if he comes to you, welcome him)." A person named Mark is also mentioned in Paul's letter to Philemon, "Epaphras, my fellow prisoner in Christ Jesus, greets you, as do Mark, Aristarchus, Demas, Luke, my fellow workers. (Philemon 1:23-24 NAU) This indicates that Mark the Cousin of Barnabas was with Paul during his First Imprisonment in Rome, during which he wrote the four Prison Epistles (Ephesians, Colossians, Philemon, and Philippians).

== Identification ==
According to Hippolytus of Rome, in his work On the Seventy Apostles, Mark the cousin of Barnabas (Colossians 4:10; Philemon 24) is distinct from John Mark (Acts 12:12, 25; 13:5, 13; 15: 37) and Mark the Evangelist (perhaps the Mark in 2 Timothy 4:11?). They all belonged to the Seventy Apostles of Christ (ranked #56, #65, and #14, respectively), who were sent out by Jesus to saturate Judea with the gospel not long before his crucifixion (Luke 10:1ff.). Hippolytus says that Mark the cousin of Barnabas was a leader of the apostolic church and the bishop of Apollonia. (There are three possible sites for this place: one in Albania, one in Thrace, and one in Cyrenaica.)

Biblical scholars Samuel Rolles Driver and Charles Augustus Briggs identified Mark, the cousin of Barnabas, with John Mark of Jerusalem, as do John R. Donahue and Daniel J. Harrington.
