= Lectionary 315 =

Lectionary ℓ 315
- New Testament manuscript
- Text: Evangelistarium, Apostolarium †
- Date: 16th-century
- Script: Greek
- Found: 1864
- Now at: ?
- Size: 15.2 cm by 10.1 cm
- Type: Byzantine text-type

Lectionary 315 (Gregory-Aland), designated by siglum ℓ 315 (in the Gregory-Aland numbering) is a Greek manuscript of the New Testament, on paper. Palaeographically it has been assigned to the 16th century. The manuscript has been lost.

== Description ==
The codex contains Lessons from the Gospels lectionary (Evangelistarium), Acts, Paul and Catholic epistles (Apostolarium). It contains also some additional matter with names of monks and woman.

The lessons of lectionary following the Byzantine Church order (15 lessons are from New Testament, three lessons are from Book of Isaiah). It is written in Greek minuscule letters, on 316 paper leaves (15.2 cm by 10.1 cm), 2 columns per page, 22 lines per page.

It uses breathing and accents.

== History ==
Scrivener dated the manuscript to the 14th or 15th century. Gregory dated it to the 14th century. It has been assigned by the Institute for New Testament Textual Research (INTF) to the 16th century.

Of the history of the codex ℓ 315 nothing is known until 1864, when it was in the possession of a dealer at Janina in Epeiros. It was then purchased from him by a representative of Baroness Burdett-Coutts (1814–1906), a philanthropist, together with other Greek manuscripts (among them lectionaries ℓ 313 and ℓ 314) and they were all transported to England in 1870–1871. The manuscript was lost at the beginning of the 20th century.

The manuscript was added to the list of New Testament manuscripts by F. H. A. Scrivener (253^{e} 67^{a}) and Caspar René Gregory (number 313^{e} 184^{a}). Scrivener collated its text.

It was held in London (Burdett-Coutts III. 42). The current location and owner of the codex are unknown.

The manuscript is not cited in critical editions of the Greek New Testament (UBS4, NA28).

== See also ==
- List of New Testament lectionaries
- Biblical manuscript
- Textual criticism

== Bibliography ==
- Gregory, Caspar René (1900). Textkritik des Neuen Testaments. Vol. 1. Leipzig: J.C. Hinrichs’sche Buchhandlung. p. 414.
- Frederick Henry Ambrose Scrivener (1893). Adversaria Critica Sacra: With a Short Explanatory Introduction. Cambridge: Cambridge, [Eng.] : University Press. pp. LXVIII–LXXI, 1–59. (as w)
- Robert Mathiesen (Jan 1983). "An Important Greek Manuscript Rediscovered and Redated (Codex Burdett-Coutts III.42)". The Harvard Theological Review. 76 (1): 131–133. doi:10.1017/S0017816000018502. JSTOR 1509440. S2CID 163942322.
