= Mark the Evangelist =

Apostle of Jesus

Saint Mark Evangelist and Pope of Alexandria
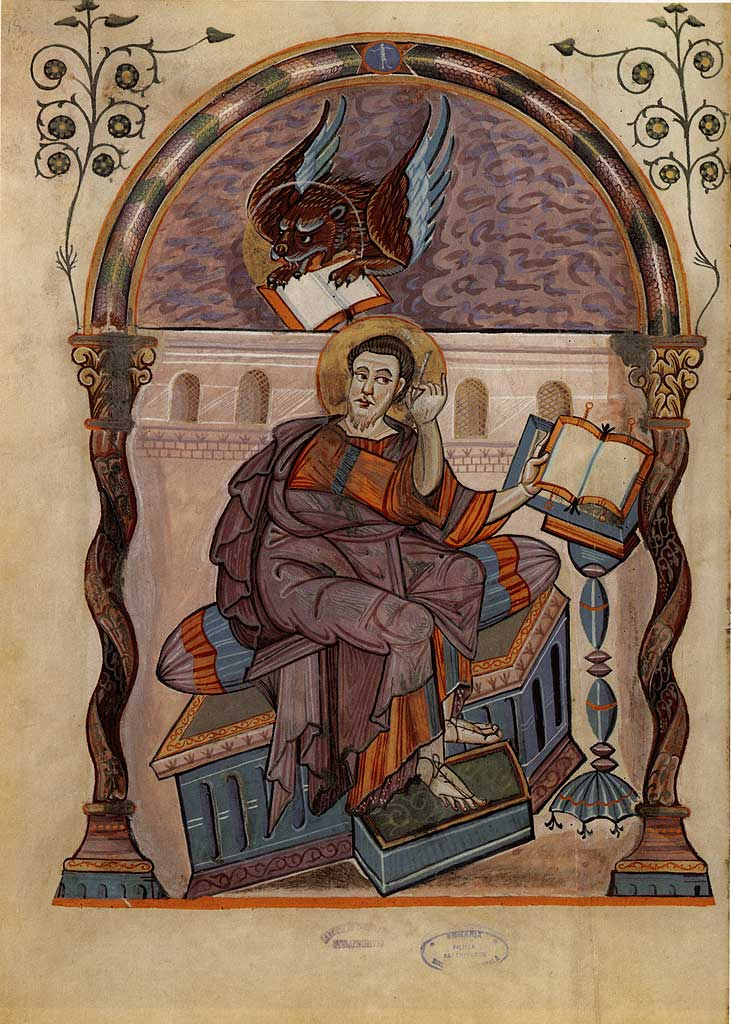
- St. Mark the Evangelist listening to the winged lion, Lorsch Gospels (9th century)
- Born: c. 12 AD; Cyrene, Crete and Cyrenaica, Roman Empire (now Libya) (according to Coptic tradition)
- Died: c. 68 AD (aged c. 56); Alexandria, Egypt, Roman Empire
- Venerated in: All Christian churches that venerate saints
- Major shrine: St Mark's Basilica (Venice); Saint Mark's Coptic Orthodox Cathedral (Alexandria)
- Feast: 25 April (Catholic, Anglican Church, and Eastern Orthodox Julian calendar date); 30 Parmouti or 8 May (Coptic Orthodox and Eastern Orthodox Gregorian calendar date)
- Patronage: Barristers, Venice, Egypt, Copts, Mainar, Podgorica, Pangil, Laguna
- Major works: Gospel of Mark (attributed)

Mark the Evangelist (Note: Latin: Marcus; Ancient Greek: Μᾶρκος, romanized: Mârkos; Imperial Aramaic: ܡܪܩܘܣ, romanized: Marqōs; Hebrew: מַרְקוֹס, romanized: Marqōs; Ge'ez: ማርቆስ, romanized: Marḳos.) (Koinē Greek: Μᾶρκος, romanized: Mârkos), also known as John Mark (Koinē Greek: Ἰωάννης Μᾶρκος, romanized: Iōánnēs Mârkos; Aramaic: ܝܘܚܢܢ, romanized: Yōḥannān) or Saint Mark, was a person, subsequently venerated as a saint, to whom is traditionally ascribed the authorship of the Gospel of Mark. According to Coptic Christian tradition he was a Roman African from Ancient Libya, although this belief is not shared by other denominations. Like many ancient biographies the Gospel of Mark does not name its author, and scholarship is inconclusive on authorship, which remains contentious among experts; some reject the attribution to Mark while others debate the identity of Mark. According to church tradition, Mark founded the episcopal see of Alexandria, which was one of the five most important sees of early Christianity. His feast day is celebrated on April 25, and his symbol is the winged lion.

== Identity ==
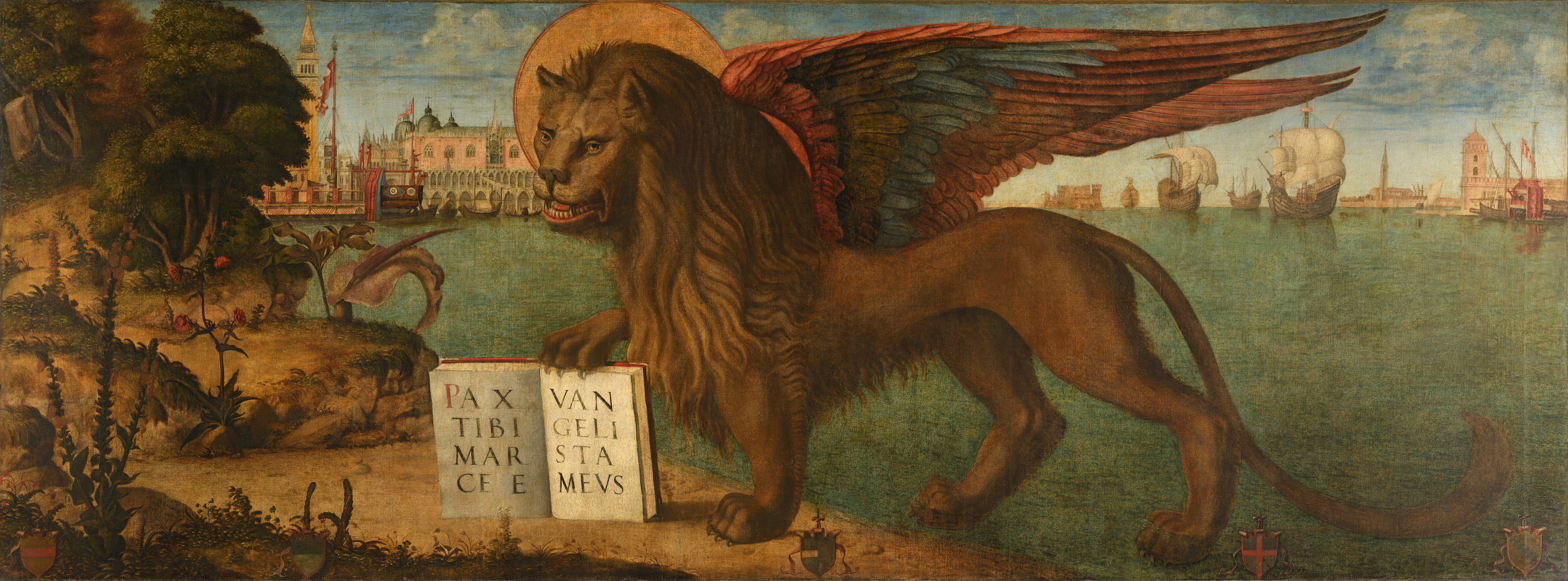
Mark the Evangelist's symbol is the winged lion, the Lion of Saint Mark. Inscription: PAX TIBI MARCE EVANGELISTA MEVS ('peace be upon you, Mark, my evangelist'). The same lion is also the symbol of Venice (on illustration).

According to William Lane (1974), an unbroken tradition identifies Mark the Evangelist with John Mark, and John Mark as the cousin of Barnabas. However, Hippolytus of Rome, in On the Seventy Apostles, distinguishes Mark the Evangelist (2 Timothy 4:11), John Mark (Acts 12:12, 25; 13:5, 13; 15:37), and Mark the cousin of Barnabas (Colossians 4:10; Philemon 24). According to Hippolytus, they all belonged to the "Seventy Disciples" who were sent out by Jesus to disseminate the gospel (Luke 10:1ff.) in Judea.

According to Eusebius of Caesarea, Herod Agrippa I, in his first year of reign over the whole of Judea (AD 41), killed James, son of Zebedee and arrested Peter, planning to kill him after the Passover. Peter was saved miraculously by angels, and escaped the realm of Herod (Acts 12:1–19). Peter went to Antioch, then through Asia Minor (visiting the churches in Pontus, Galatia, Cappadocia, Asia, and Bithynia, as mentioned in 1 Peter 1:1), and arrived in Rome in the second year of Emperor Claudius (AD 42). Somewhere on the way, Peter encountered Mark and took him as travel companion and interpreter. Mark the Evangelist wrote down the sermons of Peter, thus composing the Gospel according to Mark, before he left for Alexandria in the third year of Claudius (AD 43).

According to the Acts 15:39, Mark went to Cyprus with Barnabas after the Council of Jerusalem.

According to tradition, in AD 49, about 16 years after the Ascension of Jesus, Mark travelled to Alexandria and founded the Church of Alexandria, having already been in Egypt for 4–5 years. The Coptic Orthodox Church, the Greek Orthodox Church of Alexandria, and the Coptic Catholic Church all trace their origins to this original community. Aspects of the Coptic liturgy can be traced back to Mark himself. According to later Christian tradition, Mark became the first bishop of Alexandria and he is honoured as the founder of Christianity in Africa.

According to Eusebius, Mark was succeeded by Anianus as the bishop of Alexandria in the eighth year of Nero (62/63), probably, but not definitely, due to his coming death. Later Coptic tradition says that he was martyred in 68.

Modern Bible scholars have concluded that the Gospel of Mark does not name its author, which was common for other ancient biographies like Suetonius and Plutarch, and was not written or compiled by an eyewitness, with the traditional attribution to Mark, Peter's interpreter widely doubted. Scholarship is inconclusive on authorship; some deny that the gospel was written by anyone named Mark, while others accept that John Mark was the author. Others argue the gospel was written by a Mark not mentioned in the Bible or connected to Peter. Variations in the title of the gospel among manuscripts suggests it was a later development, with unlabeled copies circulating as late as the fourth century. Leach, Wells, and Hatina argue the author of the Gospel of Mark knew very little about the geography of the region, mediating against traditional authorship. Heidi Roskam defends Mark's familiarity with Galilee, judging much of the geography in 1-4 and 8–9 to be accurate. Michael Kok argues that claims that the author of Mark was ignorant of Palestinian geography or customs are unwarranted. The author "was very far from being a peasant or a fisherman” and was unacquainted with Jewish customs (unlikely for someone from Palestine). Although a small minority of scholars place Mark’s composition in the Galilee, this hypothesis has not gained widespread traction, and most scholars favor Rome as the location of the gospel’s composition, though Syria garners increasing support. Mitchell Reddish concedes that the name of the author might have been Mark (making the gospel possibly homonymous), but asserts that the identity of this Mark is unknown. Similarly, "Francis Moloney suggests the author was someone named Mark, though maybe not any of the Marks mentioned in the New Testament". The Routledge Encyclopedia of the Historical Jesus takes the same approach: the author was named Mark, but scholars are undecided who this Mark was.

== Biblical and traditional information ==
Evidence for Mark the Evangelist's authorship of the Gospel of Mark that bears his name originates with Papias (c. 60 – c. 130 AD). Expert consensus dates the Exposition of the Sayings of the Lord to around 110 AD. Scholars of the Trinity Evangelical Divinity School are "almost certain" that Papias is referencing John Mark. Modern mainstream Bible scholars find Papias's information difficult to interpret.

The Coptic Church accords with identifying Mark the Evangelist with John Mark, as well as that he was one of the Seventy Disciples sent out by Jesus (Luke 10:1), as Hippolytus confirmed. Coptic tradition also holds that Mark the Evangelist hosted the disciples in his house after Jesus's death, that the resurrected Jesus came to Mark's house (John 20), and that the Holy Spirit descended on the disciples at Pentecost in the same house. Furthermore, Mark is also believed to have been among the servants at the Marriage at Cana who poured out the water that Jesus turned to wine (John 2:1–11).

According to the Coptic tradition, Mark was born in Cyrene, a city in the Pentapolis of North Africa (now Libya). This tradition adds that Mark returned to Pentapolis later in life, after being sent by Paul to Colossae (Colossians 4:10; Philemon 1:24.) Some, however, think that this actually refers to Mark the cousin of Barnabas. According to tradition, after serving with Paul in Rome (2 Timothy 4:11); he made his way to Pentapolis, and later Alexandria. When Mark arrived in Alexandria, the pagans of the city resented his efforts to turn the Alexandrians away from the worship of their traditional gods. In AD 68, they placed a rope around his neck and dragged him through the streets until he was dead.

== Veneration ==
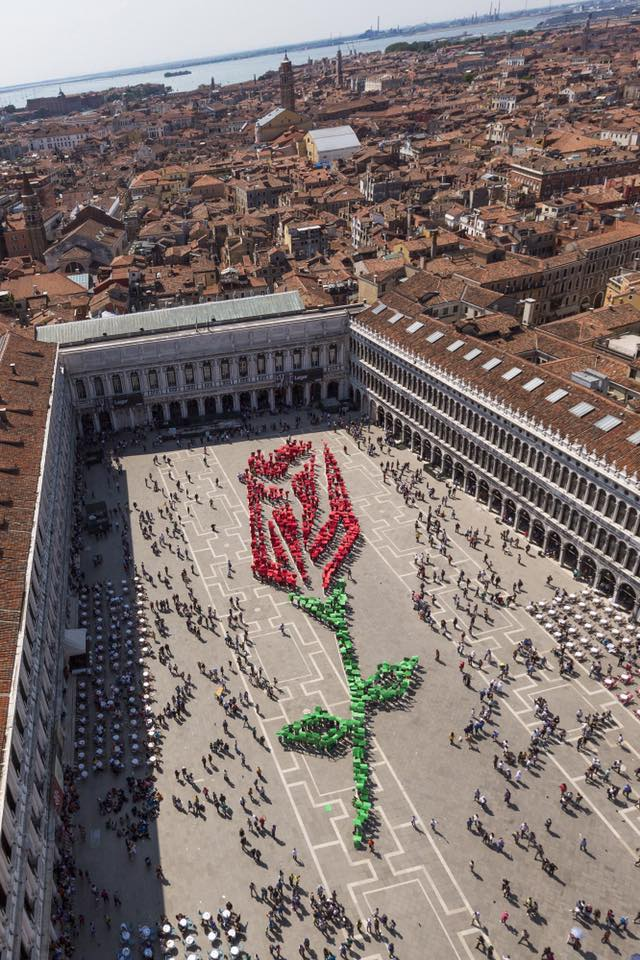
Festa del bocoło (rosebud festival) in St Mark's Square, Venice (Italy)

The Feast of St Mark is observed on April 25 by the Catholic and Eastern Orthodox churches. For those churches still using the Julian calendar, April 25 according to it aligns with May 8 on the Gregorian calendar through the year 2099. The Coptic Orthodox Church observes the Feast of St Mark on Parmouti 30 according to the Coptic calendar which always aligns with April 25 on the Julian calendar or May 8 on the Gregorian calendar.

Where John Mark is distinguished from Mark the Evangelist, John Mark is celebrated on September 27 (as in the Roman Martyrology) and Mark the Evangelist on April 25.

Mark is remembered in the Church of England and in much of the Anglican Communion, with a Festival on 25 April.

== In art ==
Mark the Evangelist is most often depicted writing or holding his gospel. In Christian tradition, Mark the Evangelist is symbolized by a winged lion.

Mark the Evangelist attributes are the lion in the desert; he can be depicted as a bishop on a throne decorated with lions; as a man helping Venetian sailors. He is often depicted holding a book with pax tibi Marce written on it or holding a palm and book. Other depictions of Mark show him as a man with a book or scroll, accompanied by a winged lion. The lion might also be associated with Jesus' Resurrection because lions were believed to sleep with open eyes, thus a comparison with Christ in his tomb, and Christ as king.

Mark the Evangelist can be depicted as a man with a halter around his neck and as rescuing Christian slaves from Saracens.

Depictions of Mark the Evangelist

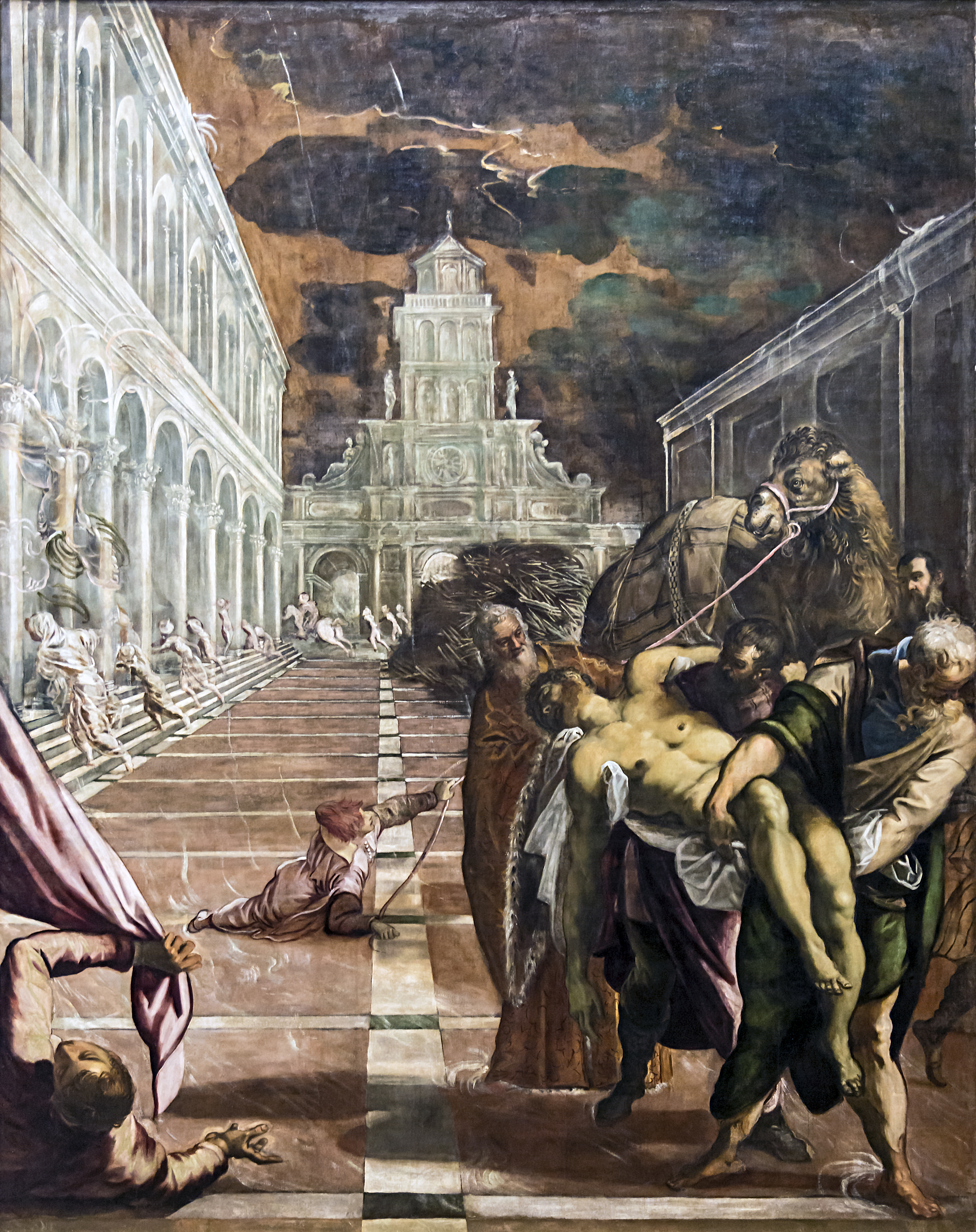
Venetian merchants with the help of two Greek monks take Mark the Evangelist's body to Venice, by Tintoretto

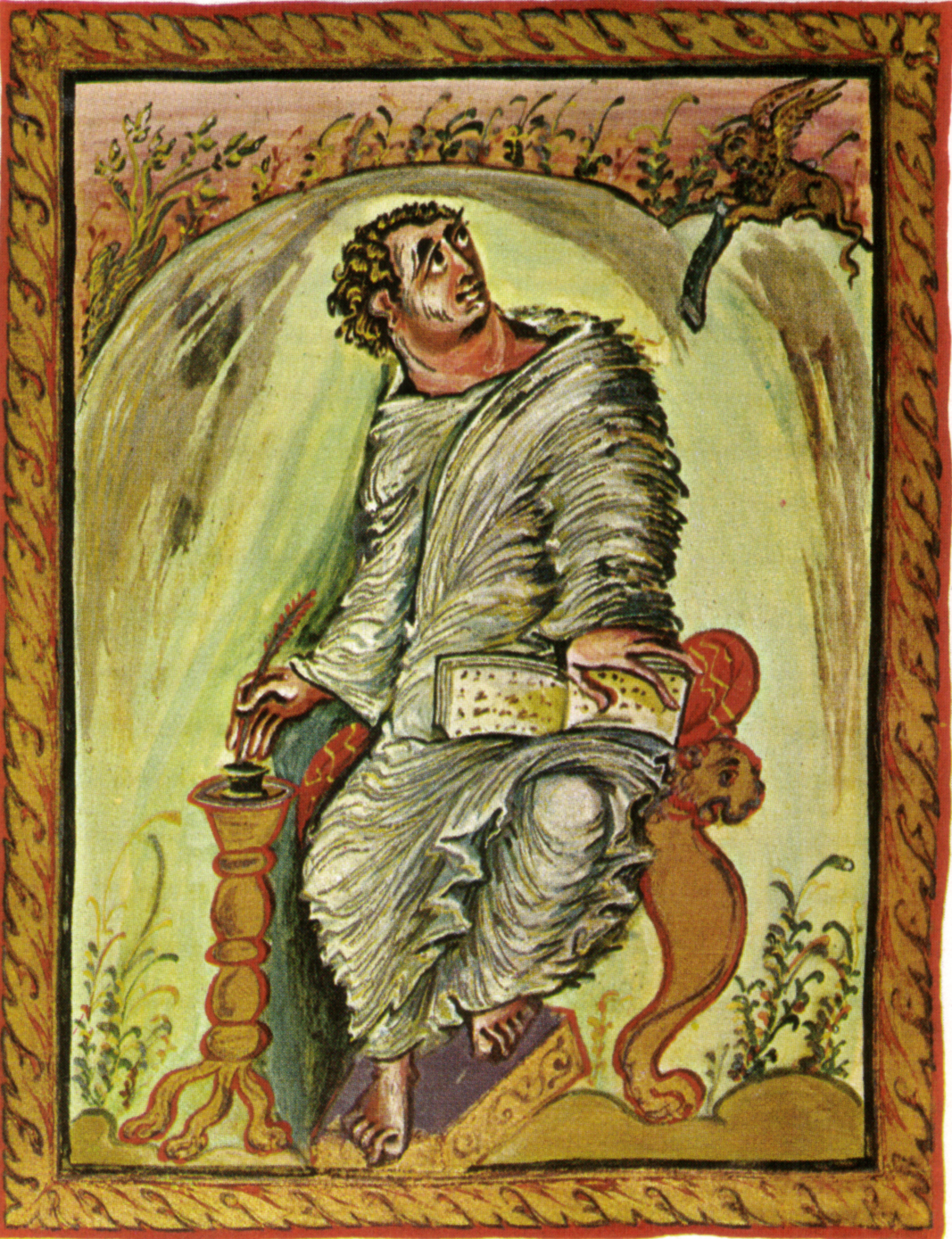
Mark the Evangelist looking at the lion, c. 823

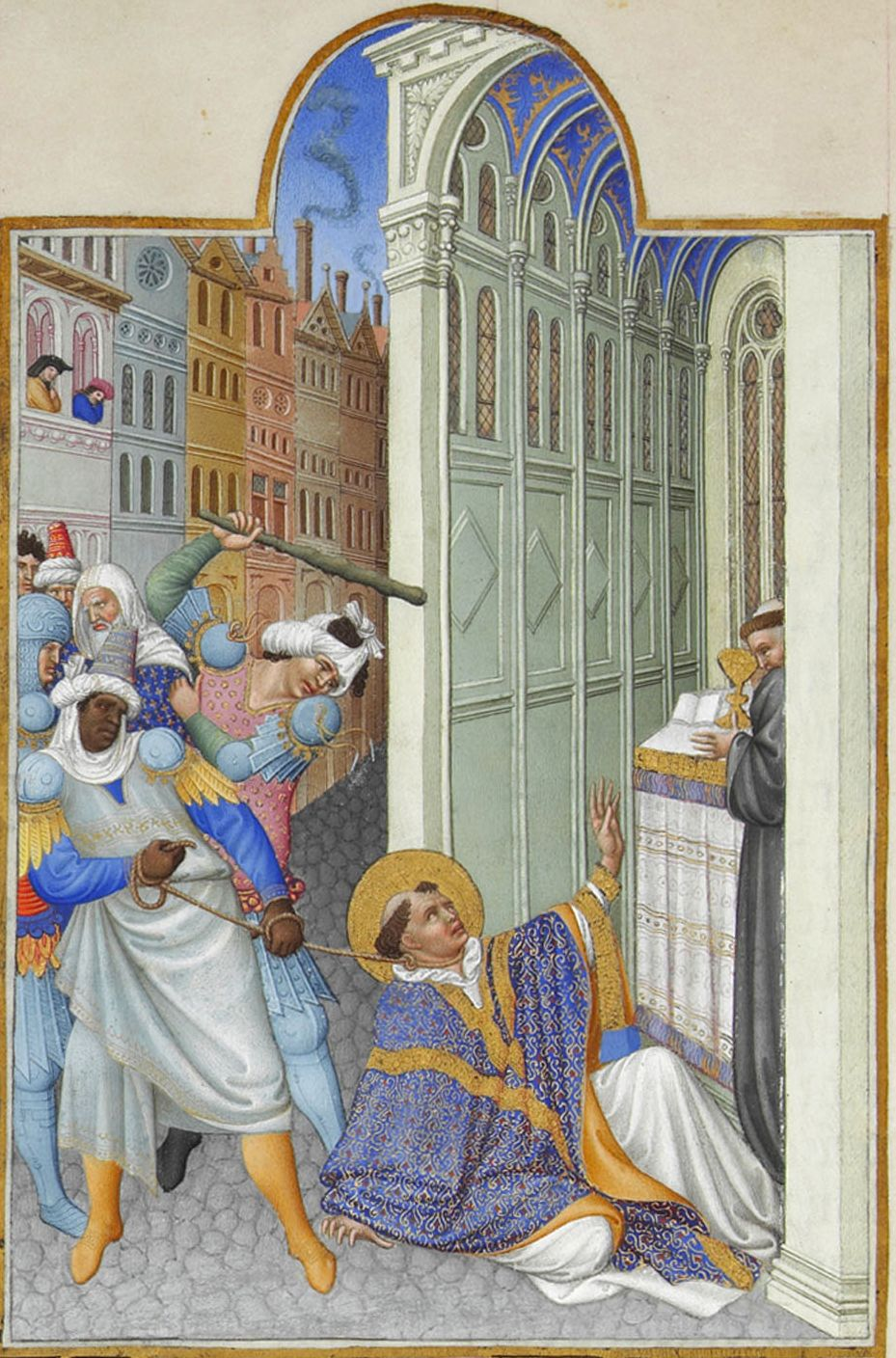
The martyrdom of Saint Mark. Très Riches Heures du Duc de Berry (Musée Condé, Chantilly), c. 1412 and 1416.

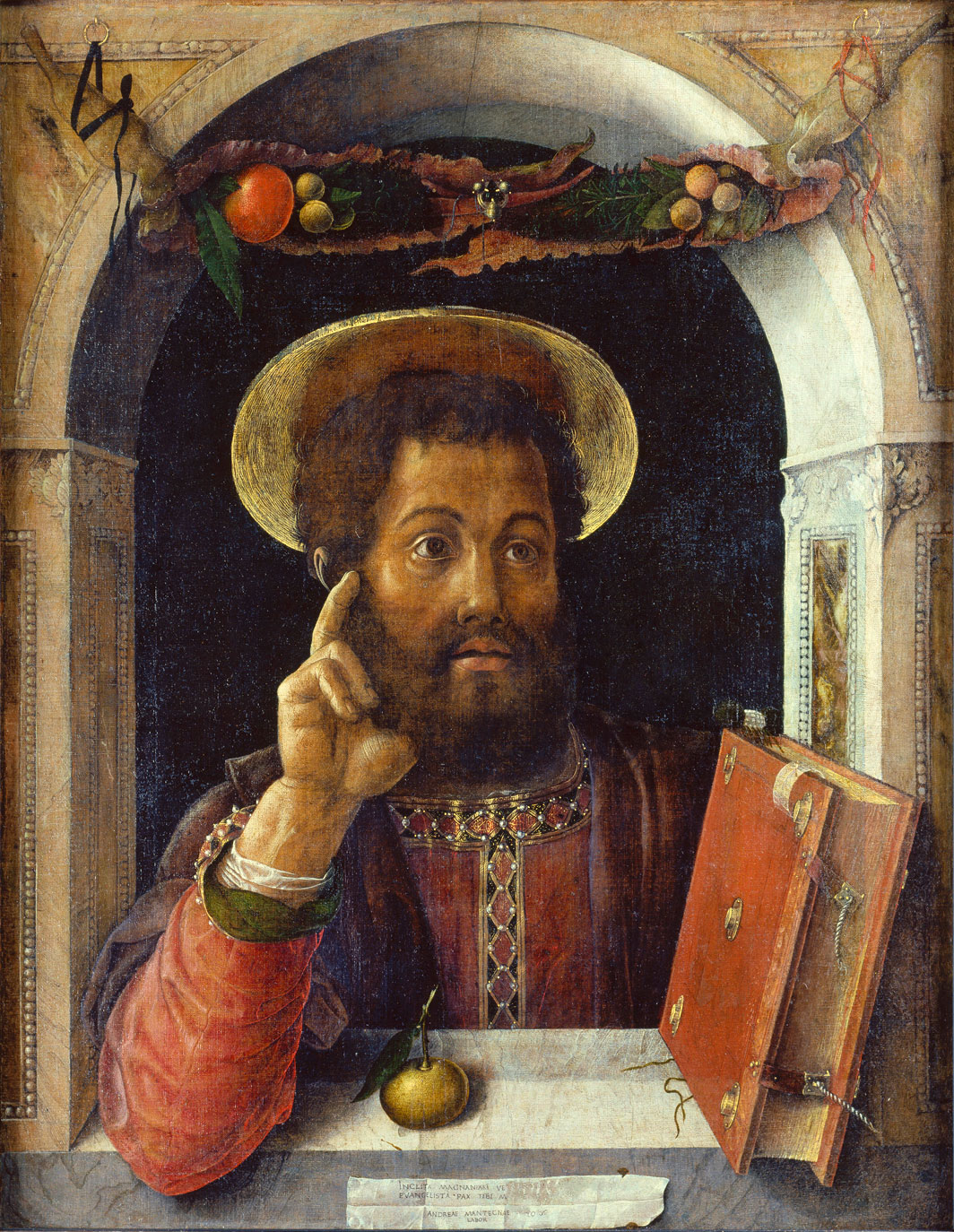
St Mark by Andrea Mantegna, 1448

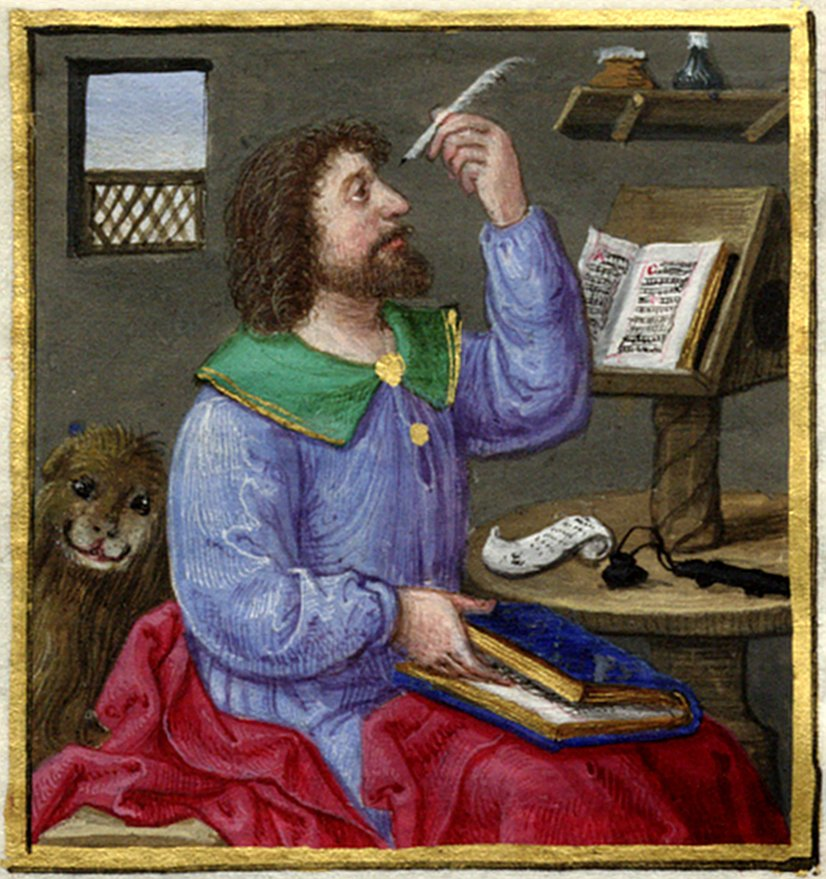
Mark the Evangelist with the lion, 1524

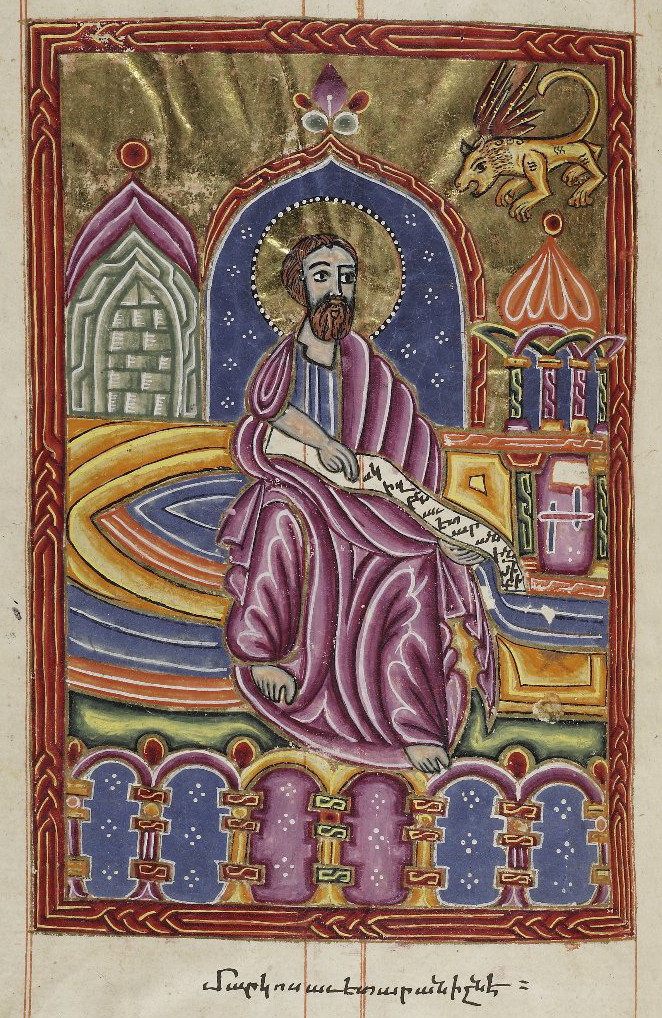
A painted miniature in an Armenian Gospel manuscript from 1609, held by the Bodleian Library

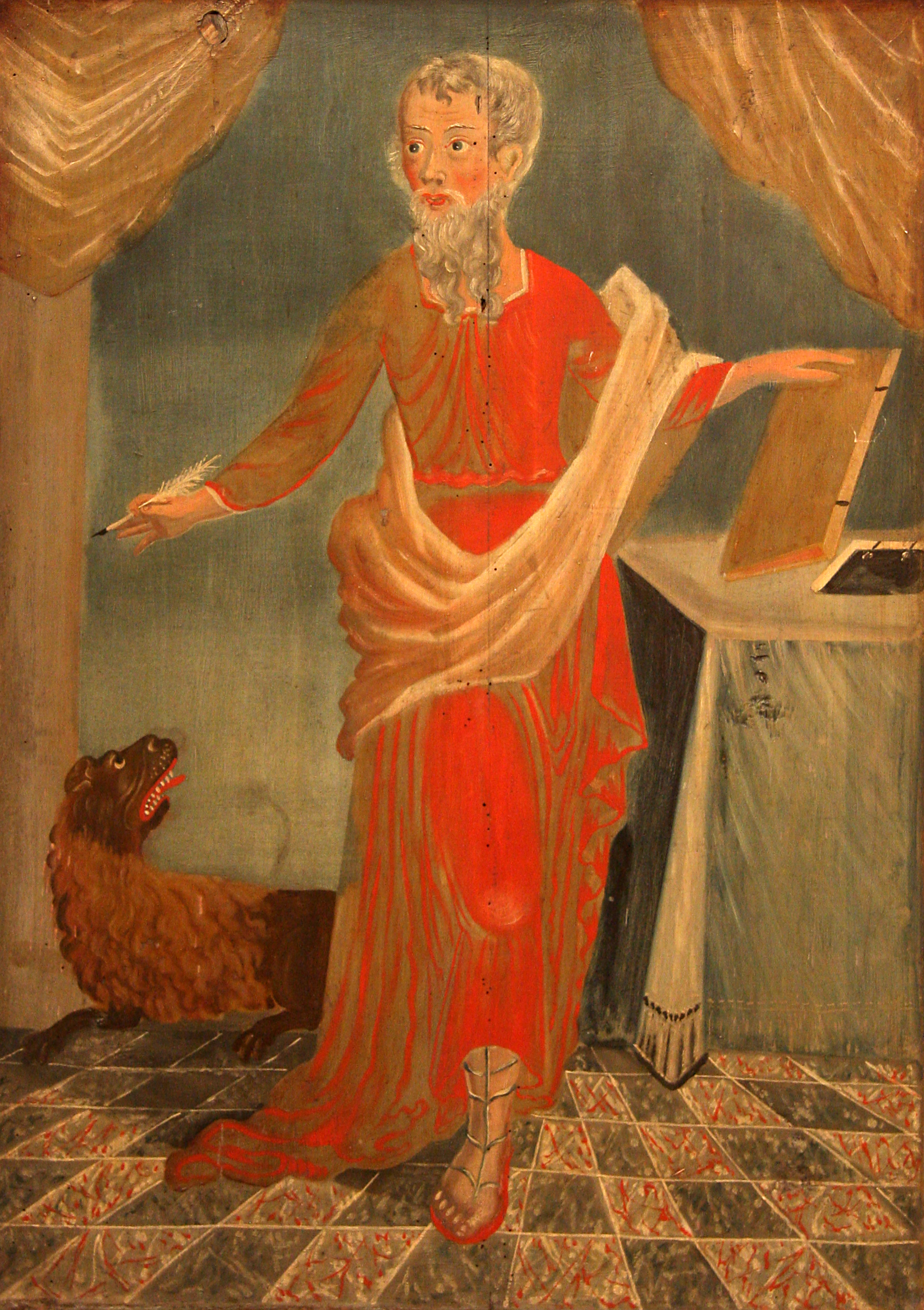
Saint Mark on a 17th-century naive painting by unknown artist in the choir of St Mary church (Sankta Maria kyrka) in Åhus, Sweden

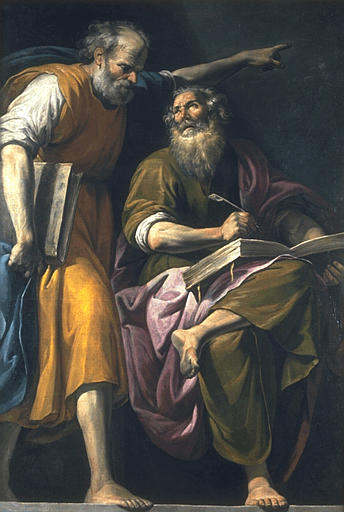
St. Mark writes his Evangelium at the dictation of St. Peter, by Pasquale Ottino, 17th century, Beaux-Arts, Bordeaux

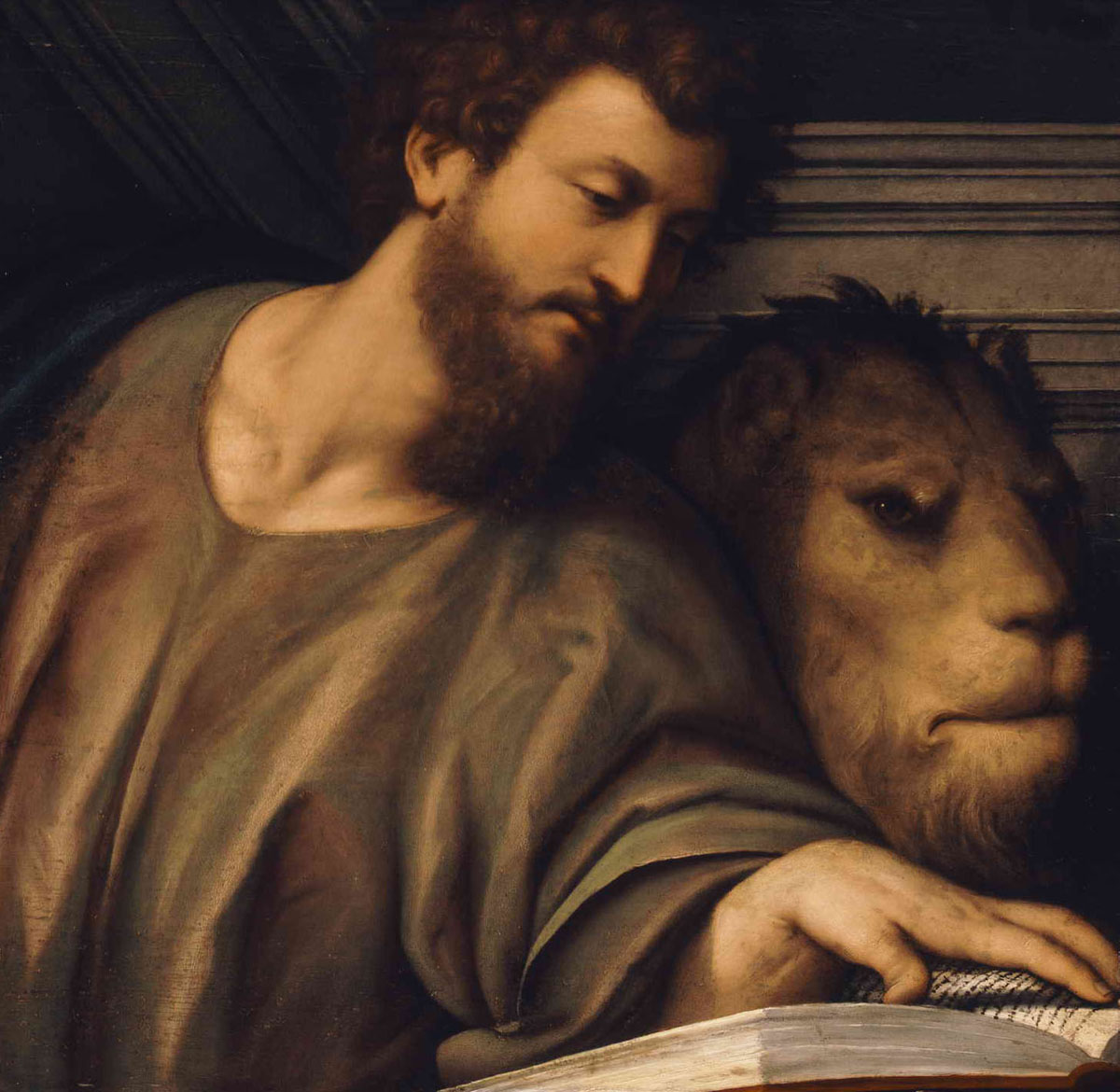
Mark the Evangelist by Il Pordenone (c. 1484 – c. 1539)

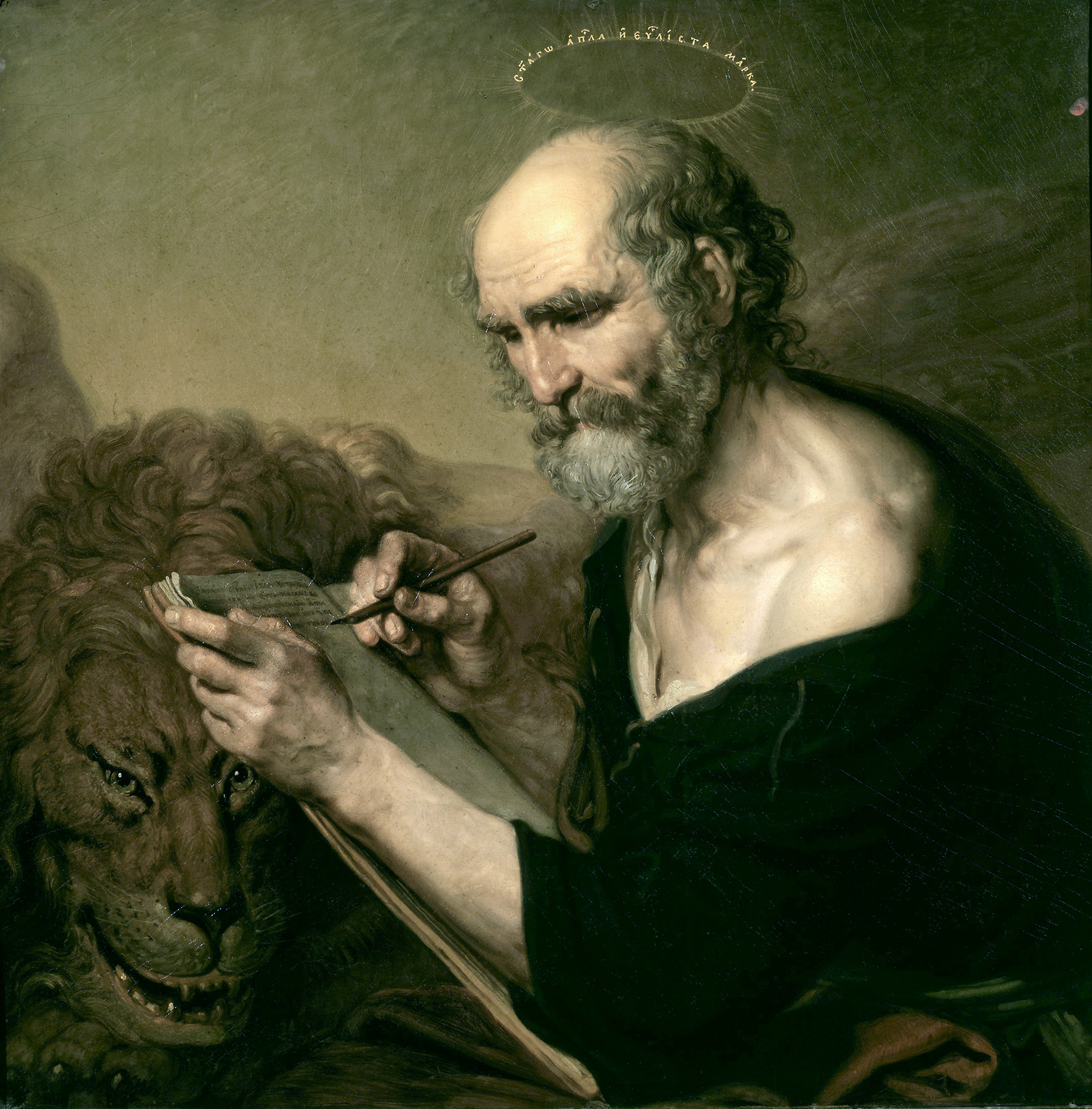
Saint Mark the Evangelist Icon from the royal gates of the central iconostasis of the Kazan Cathedral in Saint Petersburg, 1804

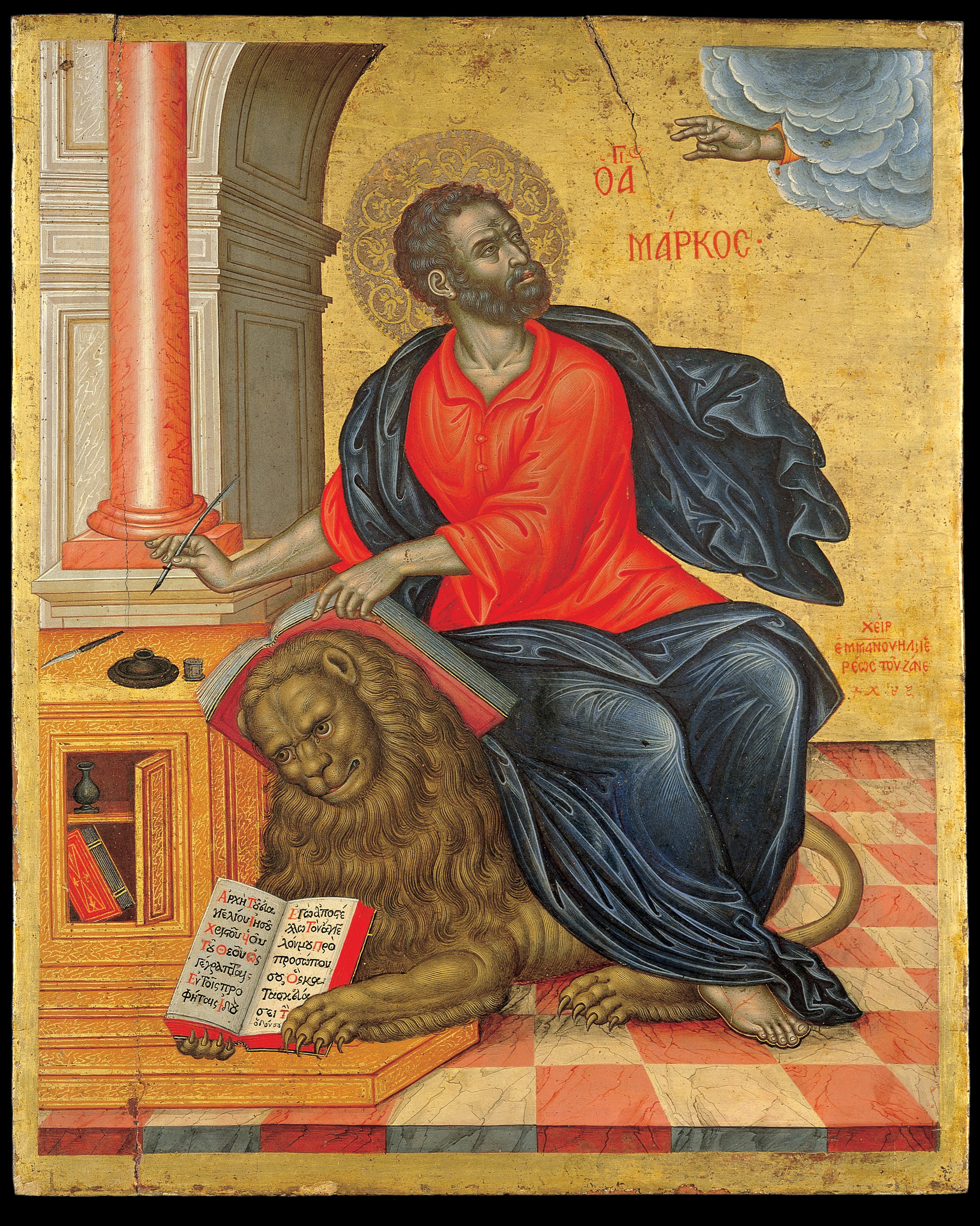
An icon of Saint Mark the Evangelist, 1657

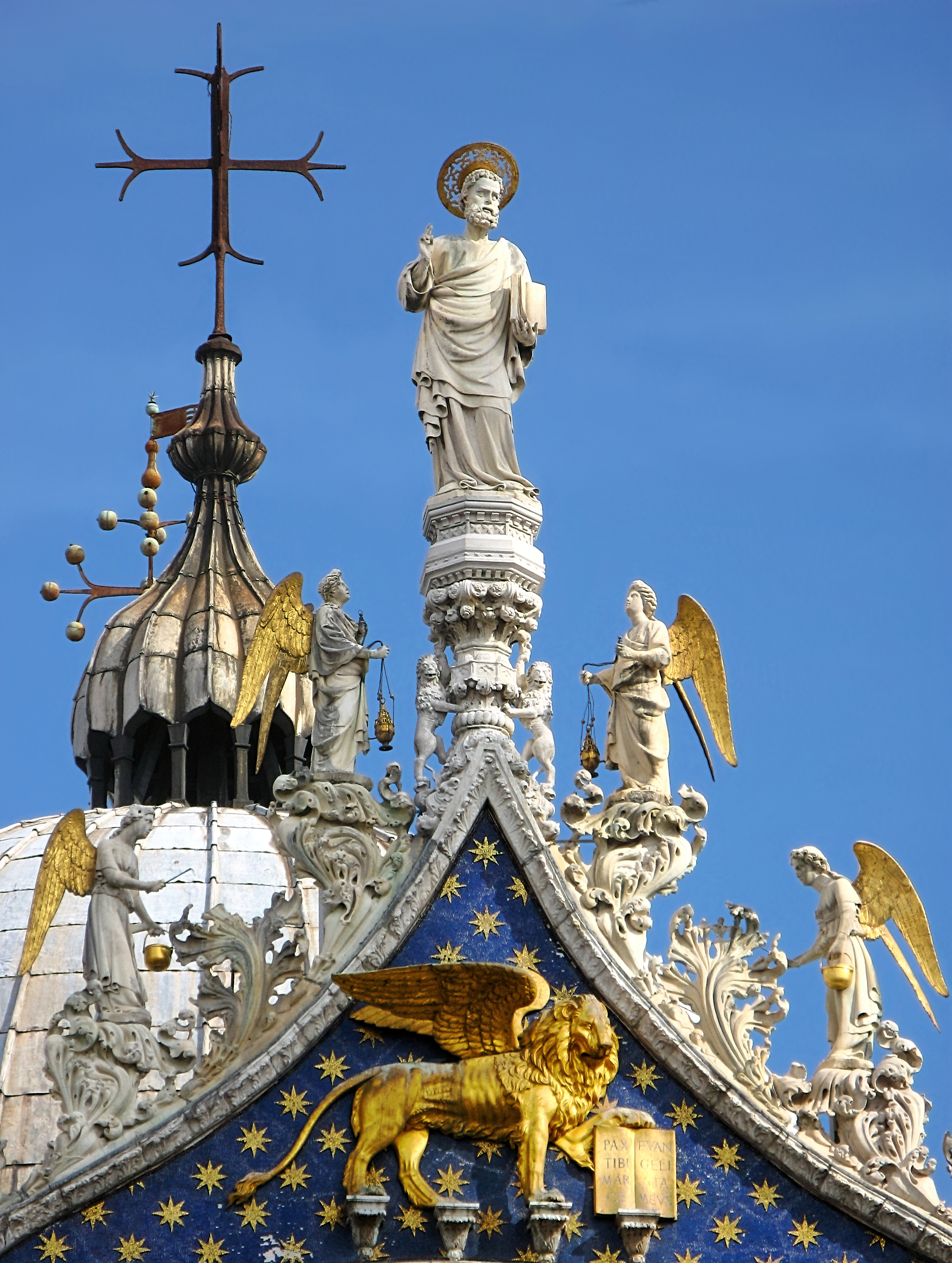
Saint Mark's Basilica

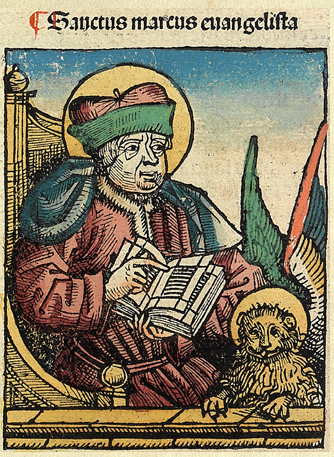
St Mark in the Nuremberg Chronicle

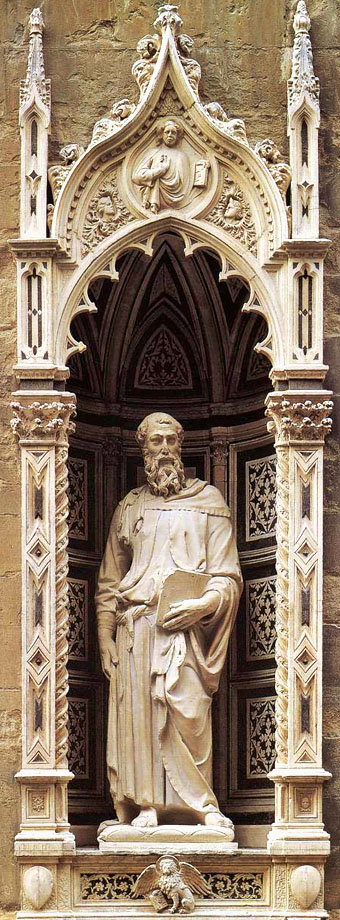
Saint Mark, 1411–1413, by Donatello (Orsanmichele, Florence)

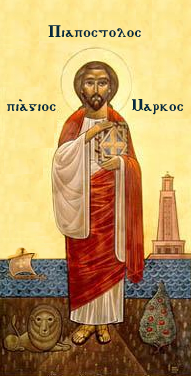
Coptic icon of Saint Mark the Evangelist

== Major shrines ==
- Basilica di San Marco (Venice, Italy)
- Saint Mark's Coptic Orthodox Cathedral (Alexandria, Egypt)
- Saint Mark's Church, Belgrade, Serbia
- Saint Mark's Coptic Orthodox Cathedral (Cairo, Egypt)
- St. Mark's Church in-the-Bowery, New York City, NY, the United States
- St. Mark the Evangelist Parish, Balian, Pangil, Laguna, Philippines
- St. Mark The Evangelist Parish, Linao, Ormoc City,

== See also ==
- Baucalis
- Feast of Saint Mark
- John the Evangelist
- Luke the Evangelist
- Rogation days

== Notes ==
Titles of the Great Christian Church
New creation	Pope and Patriarch of Alexandria; 43–68	Succeeded by Anianus
