= Alexander of Cyprus =

Cypriot monk

Alexander of Cyprus or Alexander Cyprius, perhaps also known as Alexander the Monk or Alexander Monachus, was apparently a 6th-century Cypriot monk active in the cloister near the sanctuary of St. Barnabas in Salaminia or Constantina. He also had as one of his aims the authentication of the ecclesiastical independence of Cyprus.

== Date and work ==
Alexander seems to have lived any time between the mid-6th century and the 9th century. The Byzantinist Alexander Kazhdan argued that the traditional view of placing him in the mid-6th century was not necessarily valid. Cyril Mango and John W. Nesbitt maintain that he was a 6th-century author, according to his literary interests.

Alexander composed a treatise called "On the Finding of the Cross" (de inventatione sanctae crucis), covering the history of Christianity from the emperor Tiberius to the discovery of the cross by Helena, the mother of Constantine the Great. There is also a Georgian version of this work, with the earliest extant manuscript dated to the 9th or 10th century.

== Identification ==
Nothing is known about the life of Alexander. Many scholars identify him with Alexander the Monk, the author of an enkomion of the apostle Barnabas, but Kazhdan views this identification as arbitrary.

== Bibliography ==
- Works collected in Migne's Patrologia Graeca, vol. 87.3 coll. 4016-88
- Clavis Patrum Graecorum 7398-7400
- S. Salaville, "Le moine Alexandre de Chypre," EO 15 (1912) 134-137 (discussion on his date)
- A. Kazhdan, "Alexander the Monk", The Oxford Dictionary of Byzantium, vol. I, p. 60 (Oxford 1991).
