= Lectionary 228 =

Greek manuscript of the New Testament

Lectionary ℓ 228
- New Testament manuscript
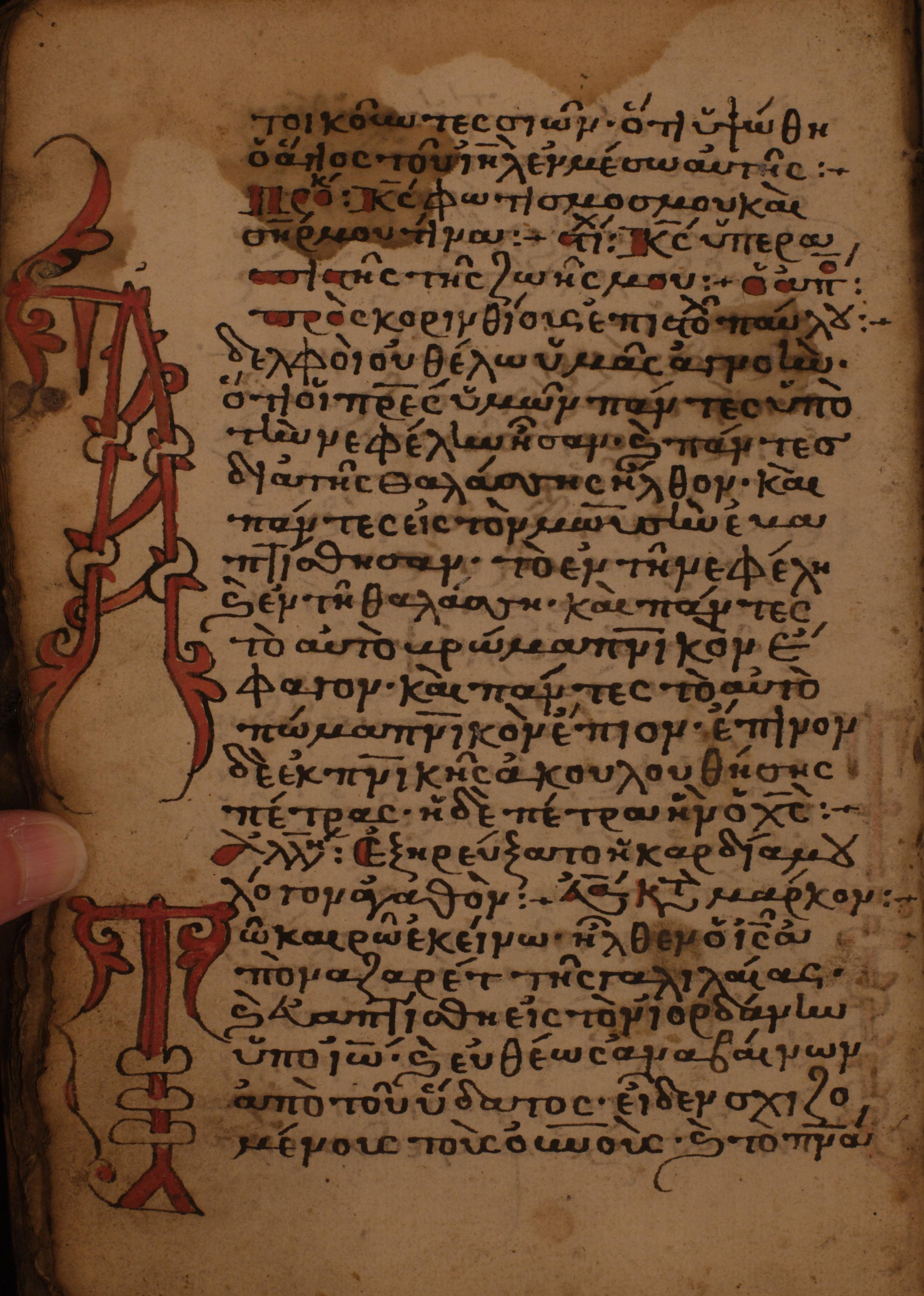
- Folio 20 verso, two decorated initials
- Text: Evangelistarium †
- Date: 15th century
- Script: Greek
- Now at: University of Michigan
- Size: 21.3 cm by 14.5 cm
- Note: some remarkable readings

Lectionary 228, designated by siglum ℓ 228 (in the Gregory-Aland numbering) is a Greek manuscript of the New Testament, on paper. Palaeographically it has been assigned to the 15th century. Frederick Henry Ambrose Scrivener labelled it by 253^{evl}. Some leaves of the manuscript were lost.

== Description ==
The codex contains 15 lessons from the Gospels, Acts of the Apostles, and Epistles, and three from the Old Testament lectionary (Evangelistarium, Apostolarium), with some lacunae. The text is written in Greek minuscule letters, on 177 paper leaves – for the New Testament – (21.3 cm by 14.5 cm), in one column per page, 26 lines per page. The initial letters are rubricated. The whole codex has 228 leaves. Two leaves numbered 20, two leaves numbered 21, 29r not numbered, 35r not numbered, 64r has two numbers, 66r has two numbers. It was written by several various hands. The initial letters are beautifully decorated.

Accents and breathings are inaccurate. Errors of itacisms are frequent, especially the interchange of ο and ω. Lessons from the Epistles and Gospels about in equal numbers. From the Septuaginta occur as lessons Isaiah 12:3-6; 35:1-10; 55:1-13; Ps 137:1-6.

Some reading are remarkable.

Matthew 1:5 – εκ της ραχαβ and εκ της ρουθ
Matthew 1:16 – ματθαν δε εγεννησε των ιακωβ ιακωβ δε
Luke 2:3 – εκαστος
Luke 2:5 – εγκυω ] εγγυω

== History ==
Scrivener dated the manuscript to the 13th century, Gregory dated it to the 15th century. It has been assigned by the Institute for New Testament Textual Research (INTF) to the 15th century.

Of the early history of the codex nothing is known until 1864, when it was in the possession of a dealer at Janina in Epeiros. It was then purchased from him by a representative of Baroness Burdett-Coutts (1814–1906), a philanthropist, along with other Greek manuscripts (among them Lectionary 214-227). They were transported to England in 1870-1871. The manuscript was presented by Burdett-Coutts to Sir Roger Cholmely's School, and was housed at the Highgate (Burdett-Coutts III. 53), in London.

The manuscript was added to the list of New Testament manuscripts by Scrivener (number 253) and Gregory (number 228). Gregory saw it in 1883. In 1922 it was acquired for the University of Michigan. The manuscript was described by K. W. Clark in 1937.

The manuscript is not cited in the critical editions of the Greek New Testament (UBS3).

The codex is housed at the University of Michigan (Ms. 43) in Ann Arbor, Michigan.

== Gallery ==
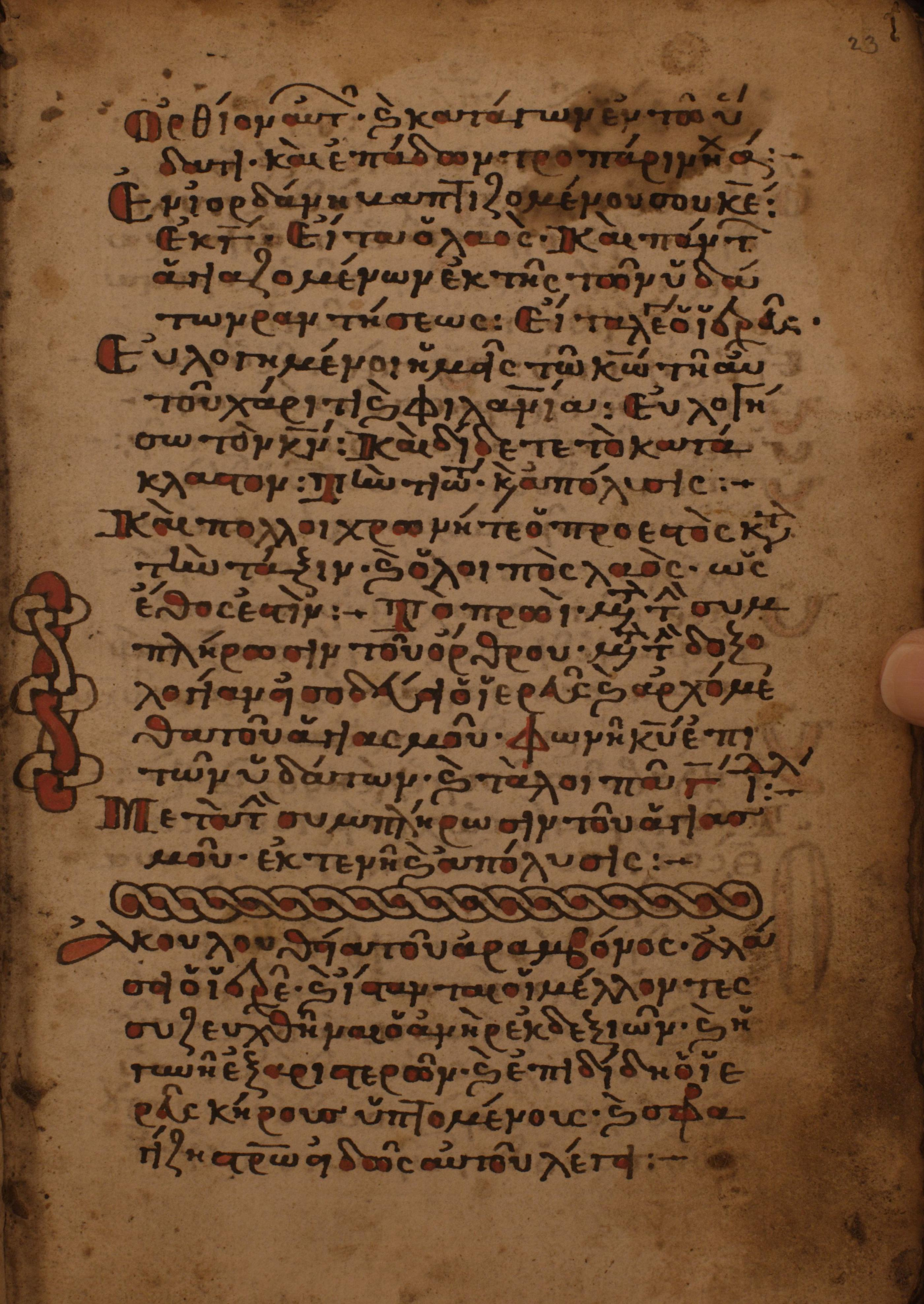
Folio 25 recto

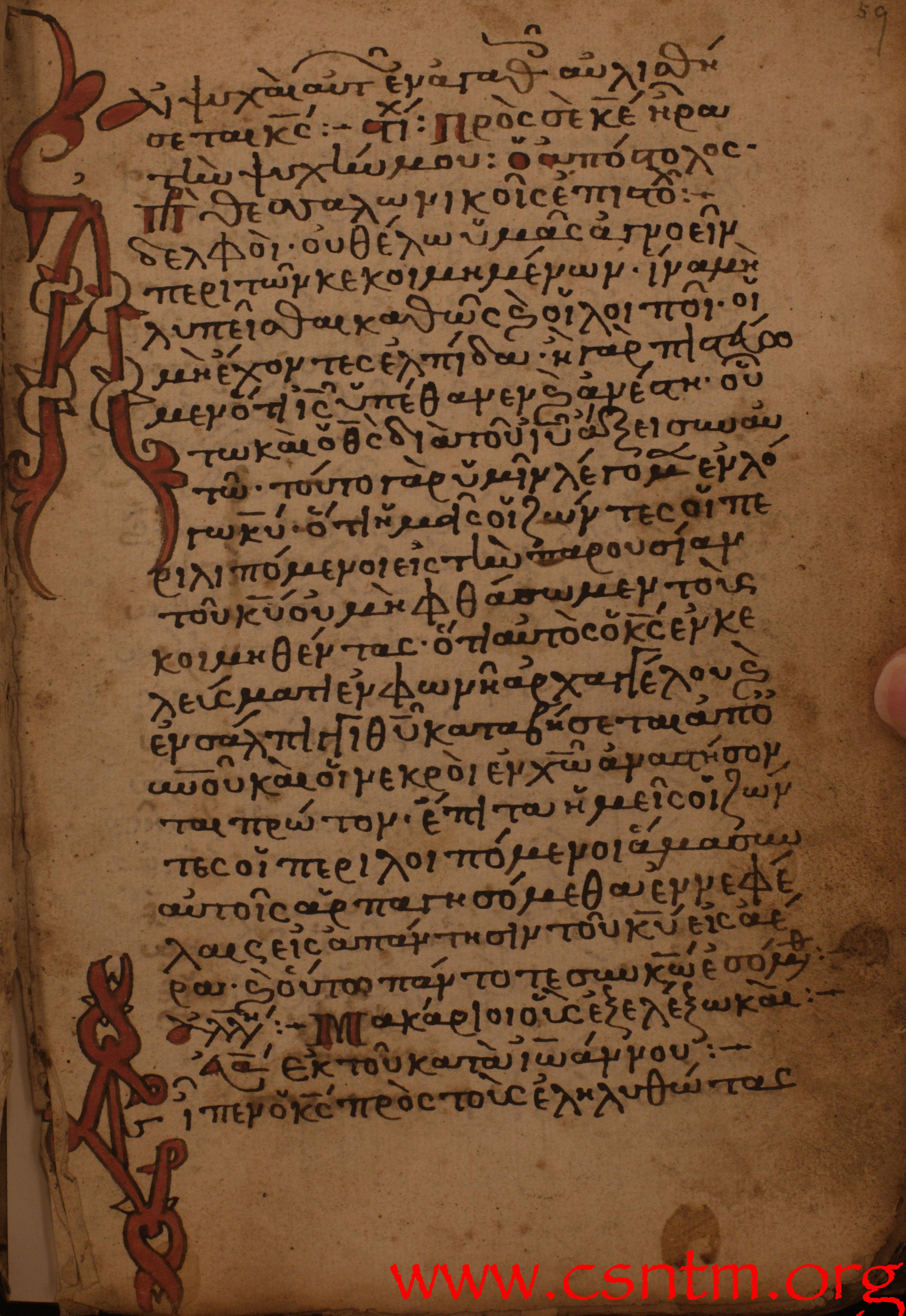
Folio 63 recto; two initials

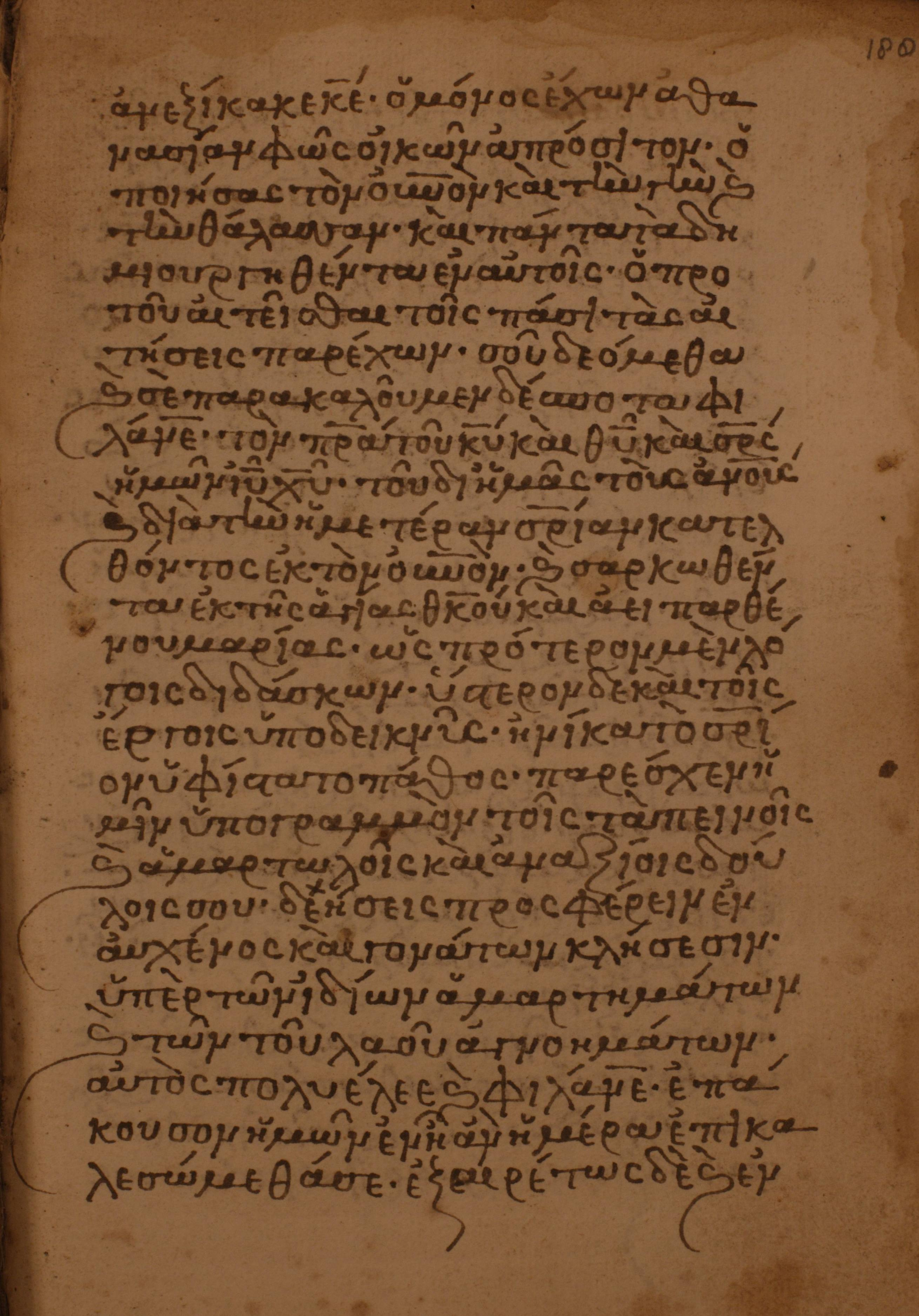
Folio 190 recto

== See also ==
- List of New Testament lectionaries
- Biblical manuscript
- Textual criticism

== Bibliography ==
- Frederick Henry Ambrose Scrivener, Adversaria Critica Sacra: With a Short Explanatory Introduction (Cambridge, 1893), pp. LXXII-LXXIII (as z)
- Kenneth W. Clark, A Descriptive Catalogue of Greek New Testament Manuscripts in America (Chicago, 1937), pp. 316–317.
