= Acts of Barnabas =

Apocryphal work attributed to John Mark

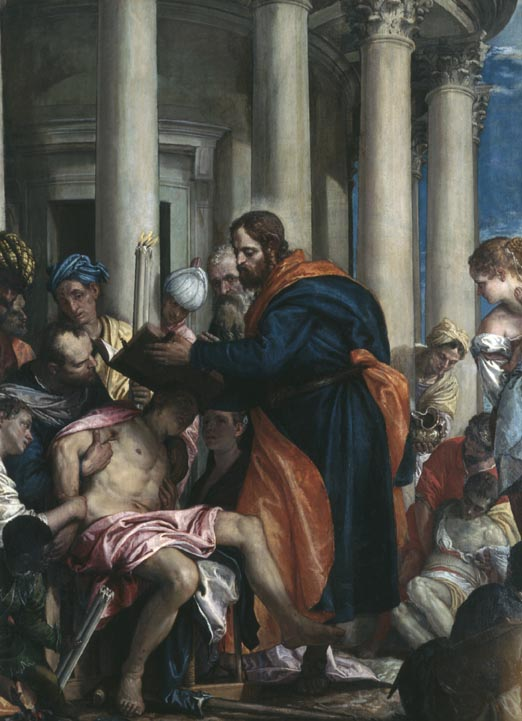
Barnabas healing the sick by Paolo Veronese, Musée des Beaux-Arts de Rouen.

The Acts of Barnabas is a non-canonical pseudepigraphical Christian work that claims to identify its author as John Mark, the companion of Paul the Apostle, as if writing an account of Barnabas, the Cypriot Jew who was a member of the earliest church of Jerusalem; through the services of Barnabas, the convert Saul was welcomed into the apostolic community. Three pseudepigraphical works are linked with the name of Barnabas: the Epistle of Barnabas, written between AD 70 and 135, this Acts and the medieval text Gospel of Barnabas. None of them have been accepted into the biblical canon.

== Text ==
The language and the ecclesiastical politics of Acts of Barnabas reveal it to be a work of the 5th century, designed to strengthen the claims of the Church of Cyprus to apostolic foundation as the site of Barnabas' grave, and therefore of its bishops' independence from the patriarch of Antioch.

These are 5th century concerns, the independence of the Church of Cyprus having been declared by the First Council of Ephesus in 431 and confirmed by Emperor Zeno in 488.

== Content ==
The text speaks of the multiple travels of Barnabas and Paul of Tarsus through the first Christian communities in Asia Minor and in Cyprus, full of miracles and preaching to the pagans, and adds the church foundations, the consecration of bishops and the tomb of the apostle in Cyprus.

From chapter 5:

After he instructed me on these things, we stayed in Iconium for many days. […] Then we arrived in Seleucia, and after the three-day stay we sailed to Cyprus. [...] Departing from Cyprus, we landed in Perge of Pamphylia. Then I stayed there for about two months, wanting to sail to the western regions, but Holy Spirit wouldn't let me. So I went back to see the apostles and, knowing that they were in Antioch, I went to them.

John and Barnabas visit Isaura, Cilicia, Cyprus and Laodiceia, where they cure many sick people and baptize. (Acts of Barnabas 11 and 12).

It is said that seven years before his martyrdom he traveled to Marmarica and Libya.

And the book ends:The travels and martyrdom of the saint Apostle Barnabas were thus accomplished by the grace of God.
