= Barnabas =

Early Christian disciple and bishop

Saint Barnabas
- Apostle and Bishop of Milan
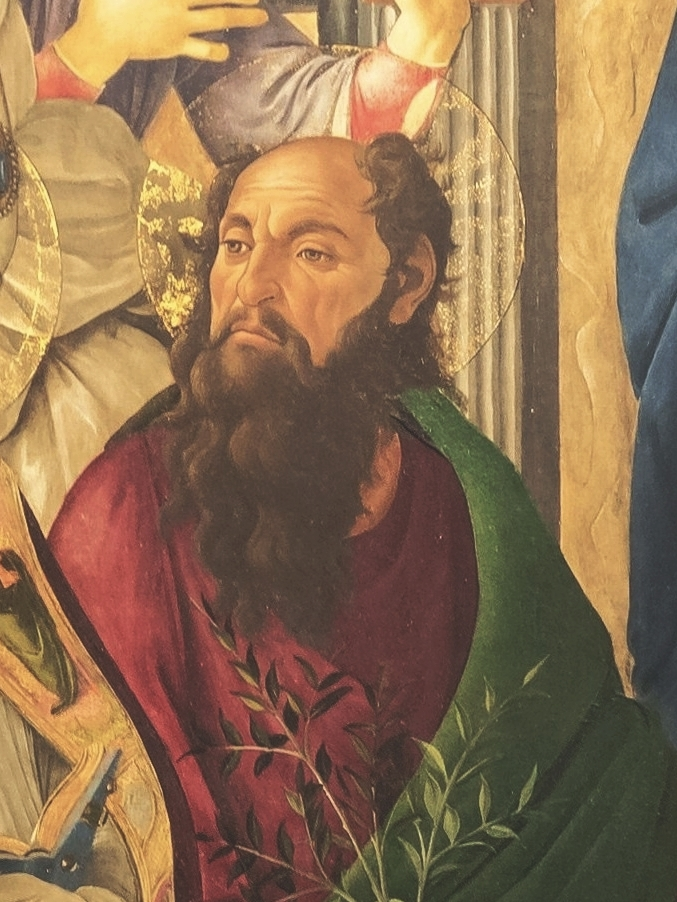
- Detail from San Barnaba Altarpiece by Sandro Botticelli, c. 1490
- Church: Early Church
- Metropolis: Milan and Cyprus
- See: Milan and Cyprus
- Successor: Anathalon

Orders
- Ordination: by Jesus Christ

Personal details
- Born: Salamis, Roman Cyprus
- Died: Salamis, Roman Cyprus
- Education: School of Gamaliel

Sainthood
- Feast day: 11 June
- Venerated in: Catholic Church; Eastern Orthodox Church; Oriental Orthodox Churches; Anglican Communion; Lutheran Church
- Canonized: Pre-Congregation
- Attributes: Red Martyr, Pilgrim's staff; olive branch; holding the Gospel of Matthew
- Patronage: Cyprus, Antioch, against hailstorms, invoked as peacemaker, peacekeeping missions
- Shrines: Monastery of St Barnabas in Famagusta, Cyprus

Barnabas (/ˈbɑːrnəbəs/; Ancient Greek: Βαρναβᾶς; Syriac: ܒܪܢܒܐ), born Joseph (Ἰωσήφ) or Joses (Ἰωσής), was a prominent Christian disciple, identified as an apostle in Acts 14:14. According to Acts 4:36, he was a Cypriot Levite. He undertook missionary journeys as a companion of Paul the Apostle, evangelizing among the "God-fearing" Gentiles who attended synagogues in some of the Hellenized cities of Anatolia. He participated in the Council of Jerusalem (c. 49 AD).

Barnabas' story appears in the Acts of the Apostles, and Paul mentions him in some of his epistles. Tertullian named him as the author of the Epistle to the Hebrews, but this and other attributions are conjecture. The Epistle of Barnabas was ascribed to him by Clement of Alexandria and others in the early church and the epistle is included under his name in Codex Sinaiticus, the earliest extant manuscript of the complete New Testament. A minority of modern scholars concur with this traditional attribution.

Christian tradition holds that Barnabas was martyred at Salamis, Cyprus. He is traditionally identified as the founder of the Cypriot Orthodox Church. The feast day of Barnabas is celebrated on 11 June.

Barnabas is usually identified as the cousin of Mark the Evangelist on the basis of the term "anepsios" used in Colossians 4, which carries the connotation of "cousin". Orthodox tradition holds that Aristobulus of Britannia, one of the Seventy Disciples, was the brother of Barnabas.

== Name and etymologies ==
His Hellenic Jewish parents called him Joseph (although the Byzantine text-type calls him Ἰωσῆς, Iōsēs, 'Joses', a Greek variant of 'Joseph'), but when recounting the story of how he sold his land and gave the money to the apostles in Jerusalem, the Book of Acts says the apostles called him Barnabas. (The "s" at the end is the Greek nominative case ending, and it is not present in the Aramaic form.) The Greek text of Acts 4:36 explains the name as υἱὸς παρακλήσεως, hyios paraklēseōs, meaning "son of encouragement" or "son of comforter". One theory is that this is from the Aramaic בר נחמה, bar neḥmā, meaning 'son (of) consolation'. Another theory derives the name from Aramaic בר נביא, bar neviyā, meaning "son of the prophet". In the Syriac Bible, the explanation of Barnabas's name in Acts 4:36 is translated ܒܪܐ ܕܒܘܝܐܐ bara dbuya'a "son of consolation." In any case, the author of Acts embraces this etymology of Barnabas's name by creating a wordplay (a figura etymologica) on it in Acts 11:22–24, where he records that Barnabas "son of encouragement" (υἱὸς παρακλήσεως hyios paraklēseōs) was sent to Antioch, where he "encouraged" (παρεκάλει parekalei) everyone to remain in the Lord with steadfastness of heart.

== Biblical narrative ==
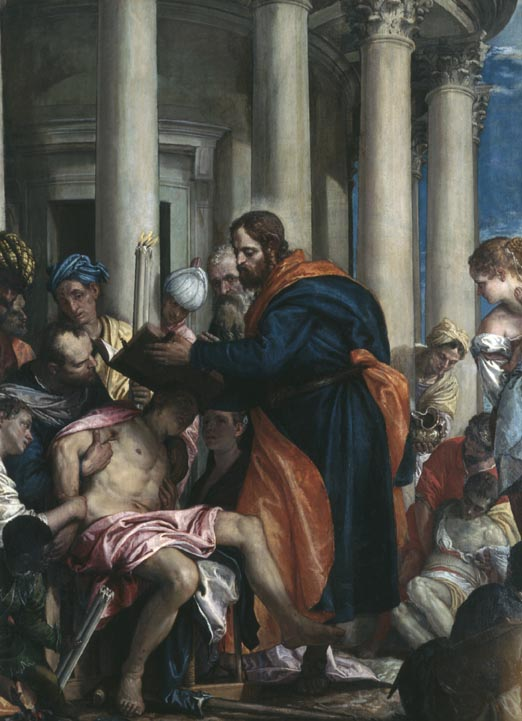
Barnabas curing the sick by Paolo Veronese, Musée des Beaux-Arts de Rouen, c. 1566

Barnabas appears mainly in Acts, a history of the early Christian church. He also appears in several of Paul's epistles. Barnabas, a native of Cyprus and a Levite, is first mentioned in the Acts of the Apostles as a member of the early Christian community in Jerusalem, who sold the land that he owned and gave the proceeds to the community. When the future Paul the Apostle returned to Jerusalem after his conversion, Barnabas introduced him to the apostles. Matthew George Easton, in his Bible Dictionary, supposes that they had been fellow students in the school of Gamaliel.

The successful preaching of Christianity at Antioch of Pisidia to non-Jews led the church at Jerusalem to send Barnabas there to oversee the movement. He found the work so extensive and weighty that he went to Tarsus in search of Paul (still referred to as Saul), "an admirable colleague", to assist him. Paul returned with him to Antioch and labored with him for a whole year. At the end of this period, the two were sent to Jerusalem (44 AD) with contributions from the church at Antioch for the relief of the poorer Christians in Judea.

They returned to Antioch taking John Mark with them, the cousin or nephew of Barnabas. Later, they went to Cyprus and some of the principal cities of Pamphylia, Pisidia, and Lycaonia. After recounting what the governor of Cyprus Sergius Paulus believed, Acts 13:9 speaks of Barnabas's spiritual brother no longer as Saul, but as Paul, his Roman name. From that point forward, when Acts refers to the two as a pair, it generally no longer uses "Barnabas and Saul", but "Paul and Barnabas". Only in Acts 14:14 and Acts 15:12.25 does Barnabas again occupy the first place; in Acts 14:14 with reference to Barnabas being mentioned first two verses earlier in Acts 14:12, and in Acts 15:12.25, because Barnabas stood in closer relation to the Jerusalem church than Paul. Paul appears as the more eloquent missionary, whence the Lystrans regarded him as Hermes and Barnabas as Zeus.

Acts 14:14 is also the only biblical verse where Barnabas is referred to using the Greek word for Apostle.

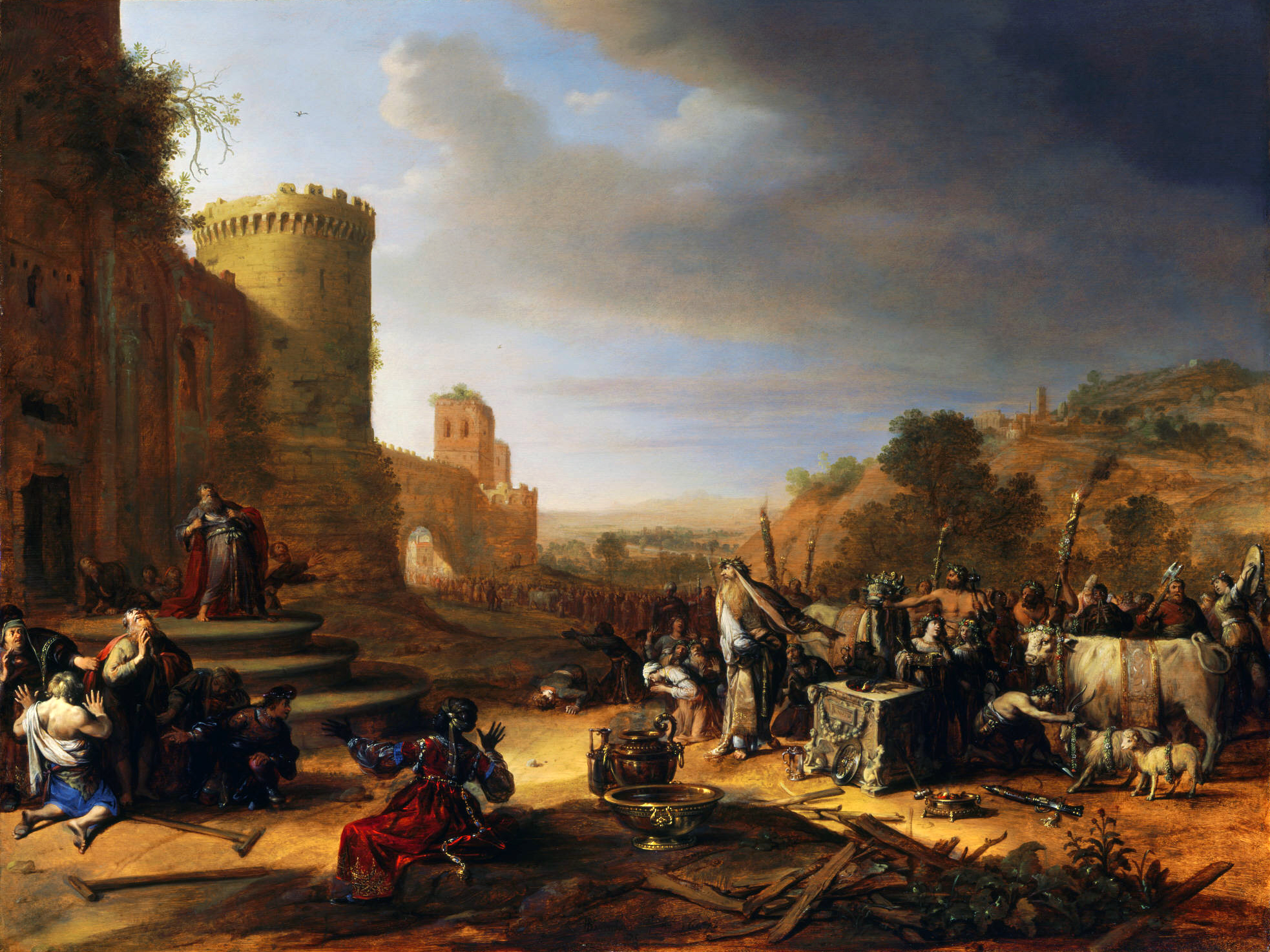
Saints Paul and Barnabas at Lystra (Sacrifice at Lystra) by Bartholomeus Breenberg, 1637, Princeton University Art Museum

Returning from this first missionary journey to Antioch, they were again sent up to Jerusalem to consult with the church there regarding the relation of Gentiles to the church. According to Galatians 2:9–10, Barnabas was included with Paul in the agreement made between them, on the one hand, and James, Peter, and John, on the other, that the two former should in the future preach to the pagans, not forgetting the poor at Jerusalem. This matter having been settled, they returned again to Antioch, bringing the agreement of the Council of Jerusalem that Gentiles were to be admitted into the church without having to adopt Jewish practices.

After Paul and Barnabas returned from the Jerusalem council to Antioch, Peter also came to Antioch. Peter associated freely with the Gentiles there, including eating with them, until he was criticized for this by some disciples of James, as doing so was contrary to Mosaic law. Peter then refused to eat any longer with the Gentiles, apparently through fear of displeasing these disciples, and Barnabas followed his example. Paul then stated that Peter and Barnabas "walked not uprightly according to the truth of the gospel" (Galatians 2:14) and upbraided them before the whole church. In Galatians 2:11–13, Paul says, "And when Cephas [Peter] came to Antioch, I opposed him to his face because he clearly was wrong. For, until some people came from James, he used to eat with the Gentiles; but when they came, he began to draw back and separated himself, because he was afraid of the circumcised. And the rest of the Jews (also) acted hypocritically along with him, with the result that even Barnabas was carried away by their hypocrisy."

Paul then asked Barnabas to accompany him on another journey. Barnabas wished to take John Mark along, but Paul did not, as John Mark had left them on the earlier journey. The dispute ended by Paul and Barnabas taking separate routes. Paul took Silas as his companion, and journeyed through Syria and Cilicia; while Barnabas took John Mark to visit Cyprus.

Little is known of the subsequent career of Barnabas. He was still living and laboring as an Apostle in 56 or 57 AD, when Paul wrote 1 Corinthians (1 Corinthians 9:5–6), in which it is stated that he, too, like Paul, earned his own living. The reference indicates also that the friendship between the two was unimpaired. A few years later, when Paul was a prisoner in Rome (61–63 AD), John Mark was attached to him as a disciple, which is regarded as an indication that Barnabas was no longer living (Colossians 4:10).

== Martyrdom ==
Saint Barnabas
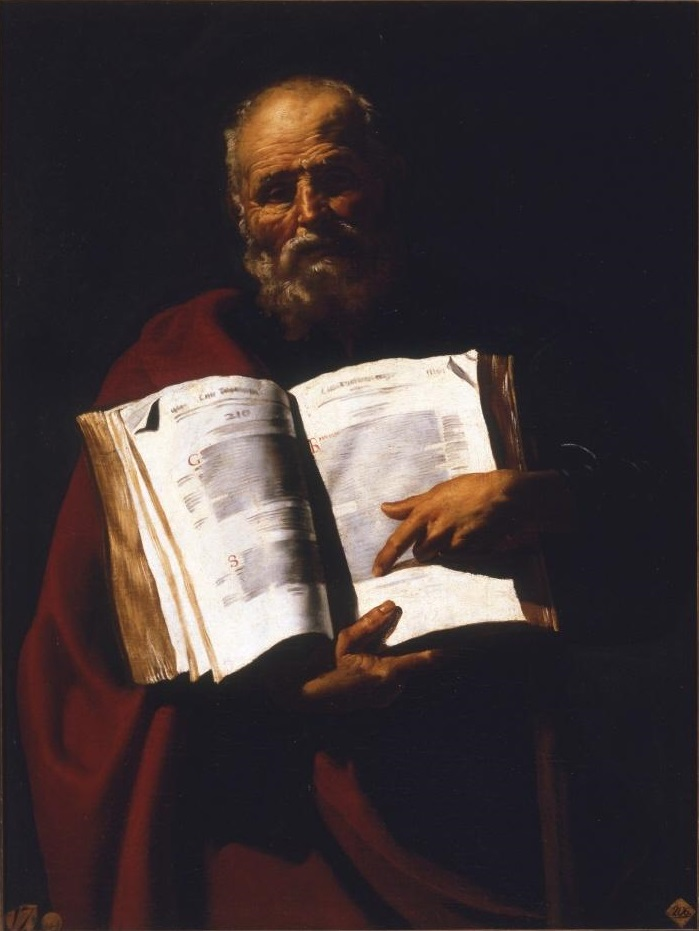
- Saint Barnabas or Saint Matthew, attrib. Juan Martín Cabezalero, c. 1640

Apostle, Disciple, Preacher, and Martyr
- Born: 1st century AD; Salamis, Roman Cyprus
- Died: Salamis, Roman Cyprus
- Venerated in: Catholic Church; Eastern Orthodox Churches; Oriental Orthodox Churches; Anglican Communion; Lutheran Church
- Canonized: Pre-Congregation
- Major shrine: Monastery of St Barnabas in Famagusta, Cyprus
- Feast: 11 June
- Attributes: Red Martyr, Pilgrim's staff; olive branch; holding the Gospel of Matthew
- Patronage: Cyprus, Antioch, against hailstorms, invoked as peacemaker

Church tradition developed outside of the canon of the New Testament describes the martyrdom of many saints, including the legend of the martyrdom of Barnabas. It relates that certain Jews coming to Syria and Salamis, where Barnabas was then preaching the gospel, being highly exasperated at his extraordinary success, fell upon him as he was disputing in the synagogue, dragged him out, and stoned him to death. His kinsman, John Mark, privately interred his body.

Although it is believed he was martyred by being stoned, the apocryphal Acts of Barnabas states that he was bound with a rope by the neck, and then being dragged only to the site where he would be burned to death.

According to the History of the Cyprus Church, in 478 Barnabas appeared in a dream to the Archbishop Anthemios of Cyprus and revealed to him the place of his sepulchre beneath a carob-tree. The following day Anthemios found the tomb and inside it the remains of Barnabas with a manuscript of Matthew's Gospel on his breast. Anthemios presented the Gospel to Emperor Zeno at Constantinople and received from him the privileges of the Greek Orthodox Church of Cyprus, that is, the purple cloak which the Greek Archbishop of Cyprus wears at festivals of the church, the imperial sceptre and the red ink with which he affixes his signature.

Anthemios then placed the venerable remains of Barnabas in a church which he founded near the tomb. Excavations near the site of a present-day church and monastery, have revealed an early church with two empty tombs, believed to be that of St. Barnabas and Anthemios.

St. Barnabas is venerated as the patron saint of Cyprus. He is also considered a patron saint in many other places in the world, including Milan in Italy. On the island of Tenerife (Spain), St. Barnabas was invoked in historical times as patron saint and protector of the island's fields against drought, together with St. Benedict of Nursia.

Barnabas the Apostle is remembered in the Church of England with a festival on 11 June.

== Other sources ==
Although many assume that the biblical Mark the cousin of Barnabas is the same as John Mark and Mark the Evangelist, the traditionally believed author of the Gospel of Mark, they are listed as three distinct people in Pseudo-Hippolytus' On the Seventy Apostles of Christ, which includes Barnabas himself as one of the Seventy-two Disciples. There are two people named Barnabas among Hippolytus' list of Seventy Disciples, One (#13) became the bishop of Milan, the other (#25) the bishop of Heraclea. Most likely one of these two is the biblical Barnabas; the first one is more likely, because the numbering by Hippolytus seems to indicate a level of significance, and Barnabas is traditionally credited with founding the See of Milan. Clement of Alexandria also makes Barnabas one of the Seventy Disciples that are mentioned in the Gospel of Luke.

Other sources bring Barnabas to Rome and Alexandria. In the "Clementine Recognitions" (i, 7) he is depicted as preaching in Rome even during Christ's lifetime.

Cypriots developed the tradition of his later activity and martyrdom no earlier than the 3rd century. The question whether Barnabas was an apostle was often discussed during the Middle Ages.

== Alleged writings ==
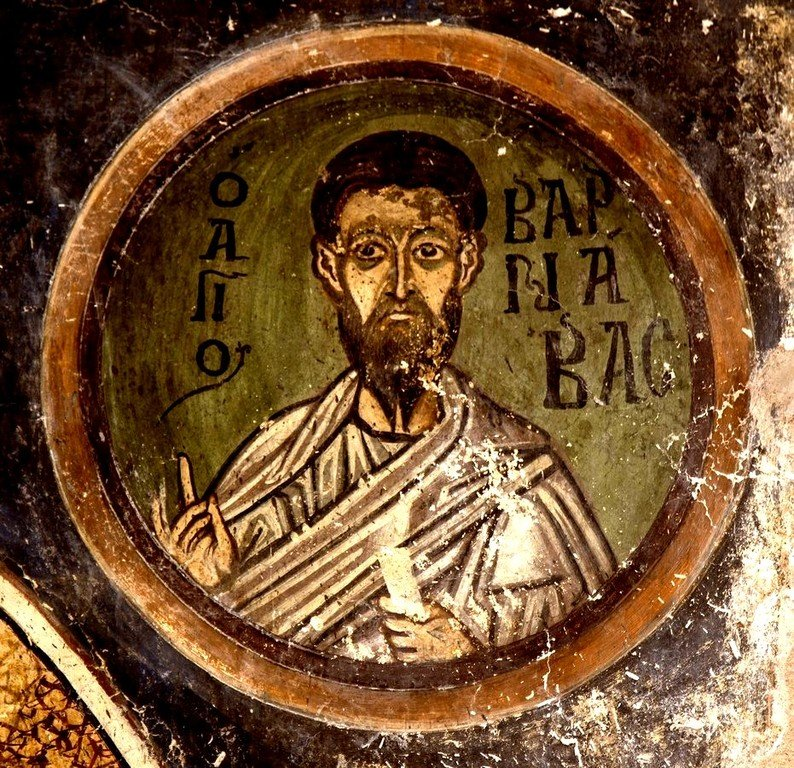
Fresco from Hosios Loukas

Tertullian and other Western writers regard Barnabas as the author of the Letter to the Hebrews. This may have been the Roman tradition—which Tertullian usually follows—and it may have been in Rome that the epistle had its first readers. Modern biblical scholarship considers its authorship unknown, though Barnabas is one of those who has been proposed as a possible author.

"Photius of the ninth century, refers to some in his day who were uncertain whether the Acts was written by Clement of Rome, Barnabas, or Luke. Yet Photius is certain that the work must be ascribed to Luke."

He is also traditionally associated with the Epistle of Barnabas, although some modern scholars think it more likely that the epistle was written in Alexandria in the 130s.

The 5th century Decretum Gelasianum includes a Gospel of Barnabas amongst works condemned as apocryphal; but no certain text or quotation from this work has been identified.

Another book using that same title, the Gospel of Barnabas, survives in two post-medieval manuscripts in Italian from the 16th century and Spanish from the 17th century. Contrary to the canonical Christian Gospels, and in accordance with the Islamic view of Jesus, this later Gospel of Barnabas states that Jesus was not God or the son of God, but a prophet and messenger and that he was not killed or crucified but that Judas Iscariot by God's miracle was transformed to look like Jesus and was crucified in his place as a divine punishment from God for his betrayal of Jesus and describes Paul as a false prophet who was deceived and deceived others into making others believe that the law was abrogated, permitting every unclean meat, abrogating circumcision laws and deifying Jesus. It also states that Jesus explicitly gave the good news of Prophet Muhammad to come after him by name.

== The Barnabites ==
In 1538, the Catholic religious order officially known as "Clerics Regular of St. Paul" (Clerici Regulares Sancti Pauli), acquired as their main seat the monastery of Saint Barnabas by the city wall of Milan. The Order was thenceforth known by the popular name of Barnabites.

== See also ==
- Catholic Church in Cyprus
- Lectionary 214 – apocryphal Apodemia of Barnabas
- List of early Christian saints
- Saint Barnabas, patron saint archive

== Notes ==
Catholic Church titles
New creation	Bishop of Cyprus; 55+	Succeeded by Gelasios of Cyprus (325)
New creation	Bishop of Milan; 50–55	Succeeded by Anathalon
