= Lectionary 214 =

Lectionary ℓ 214
- New Testament manuscript
- Text: Evangelistarium
- Date: 12th century
- Script: Greek
- Now at: ?
- Size: 24.5 cm by 20 cm

Lectionary 214, designated by siglum ℓ 214 (in the Gregory-Aland numbering), is a Greek manuscript of the New Testament, on parchment. Palaeographically it has been assigned to the 12th century. Scrivener labelled it by 239^{evl}.

== Description ==
The codex contains lessons from the Gospels of John, Matthew, Luke lectionary (Evangelistarium), on 144 parchment leaves (24.5 cm by 20 cm). The text is written in Greek minuscule letters, in two columns per page, 23 lines per page. The capital letters are written in red. It contains musical notes and pictures. It contains the Pericope Adulterae.

One leaf on paper was added in the 15th century; it has 30 leaves palimpsest, having under the Church lessons fragments of legends relating to Saints in the Menologion, including the apocryphal Apodemia of Barnabas.

There are daily lessons from Easter to Pentecost.

== History ==
Scrivener dated the manuscript to the 13th century, Gregory dated it to the 12th or 13th century. It has been assigned by the Institute for New Testament Textual Research to the 12th century.

Of the history of the codex nothing is known until 1864, when it was in the possession of a dealer at Janina in Epeiros. It was then purchased from him by a representative of Baroness Burdett-Coutts (1814–1906), a philanthropist, together with other Greek manuscripts. They were transported to England in 1870–1871. The manuscript was presented by Burdett-Coutts to Sir Roger Cholmely's School, and was housed at the Highgate (Burdett-Coutts I. 2), in London.

The manuscript was added to the list of New Testament manuscripts by Scrivener (number 239) and Gregory (number 214). Gregory saw it in 1883.

The manuscript is not cited in the critical editions of the Greek New Testament (UBS3).

The owner of the codex is unknown. The last place of its housing was Sotheby's.

== See also ==
- Gospel of Barnabas
- List of New Testament lectionaries
- Textual criticism

== Bibliography ==
- Gregory, Caspar René (1900). Textkritik des Neuen Testaments. Vol. 1. Leipzig: J. C. Hinrichs. p. 405.
