= Lectionary 227 =

Greek manuscript of the New Testament

Lectionary ℓ 227
- New Testament manuscript
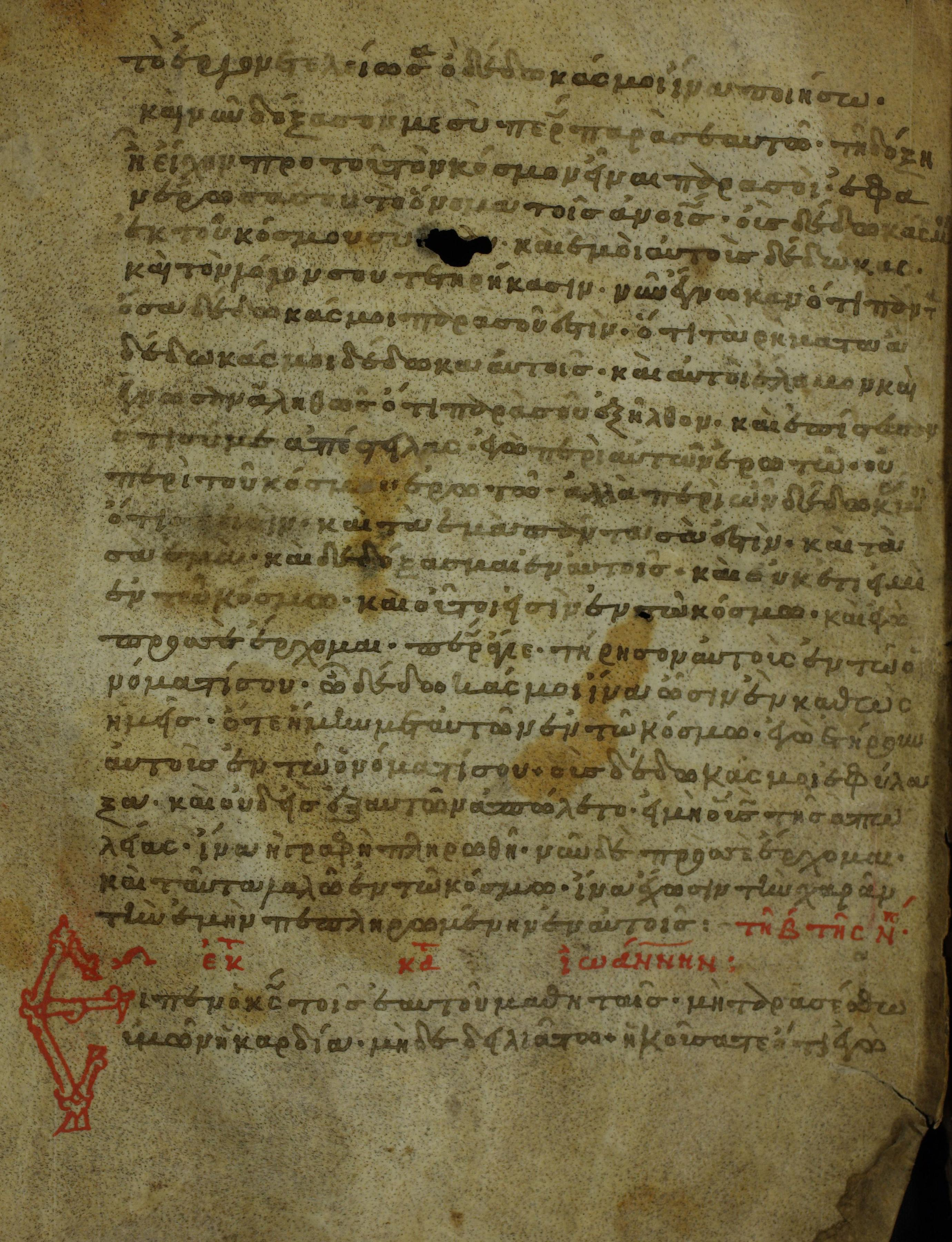
- Folio 1 verso
- Text: Evangelistarium †
- Date: 14th century
- Script: Greek
- Now at: University of Michigan
- Size: 23.5 cm by 18.5 cm
- Note: some non-Byzantine readings

Lectionary 227, designated by siglum ℓ 227 (in the Gregory-Aland numbering) is a Greek manuscript of the New Testament, on parchment. Palaeographically it has been assigned to the 14th century. Scrivener labelled it by 250^{evl}. Many leaves of the manuscript were lost, although some have survived in a fragmentary condition.

== Description ==
The codex contains lessons from the Gospels of John, Matthew, Luke lectionary (Evangelistarium), on 85 parchment leaves (23.5 cm by 18.5 cm), with numerous lacunae. The text is written in Greek minuscule letters, in one column per page, 25 lines per page. It contains several images (folios 16a, 29a, 34a, 35b, 53a, 76a, and 78a).

There are daily lessons from Easter to Pentecost.

In Luke 2:43 it has non-Byzantine reading.

== History ==
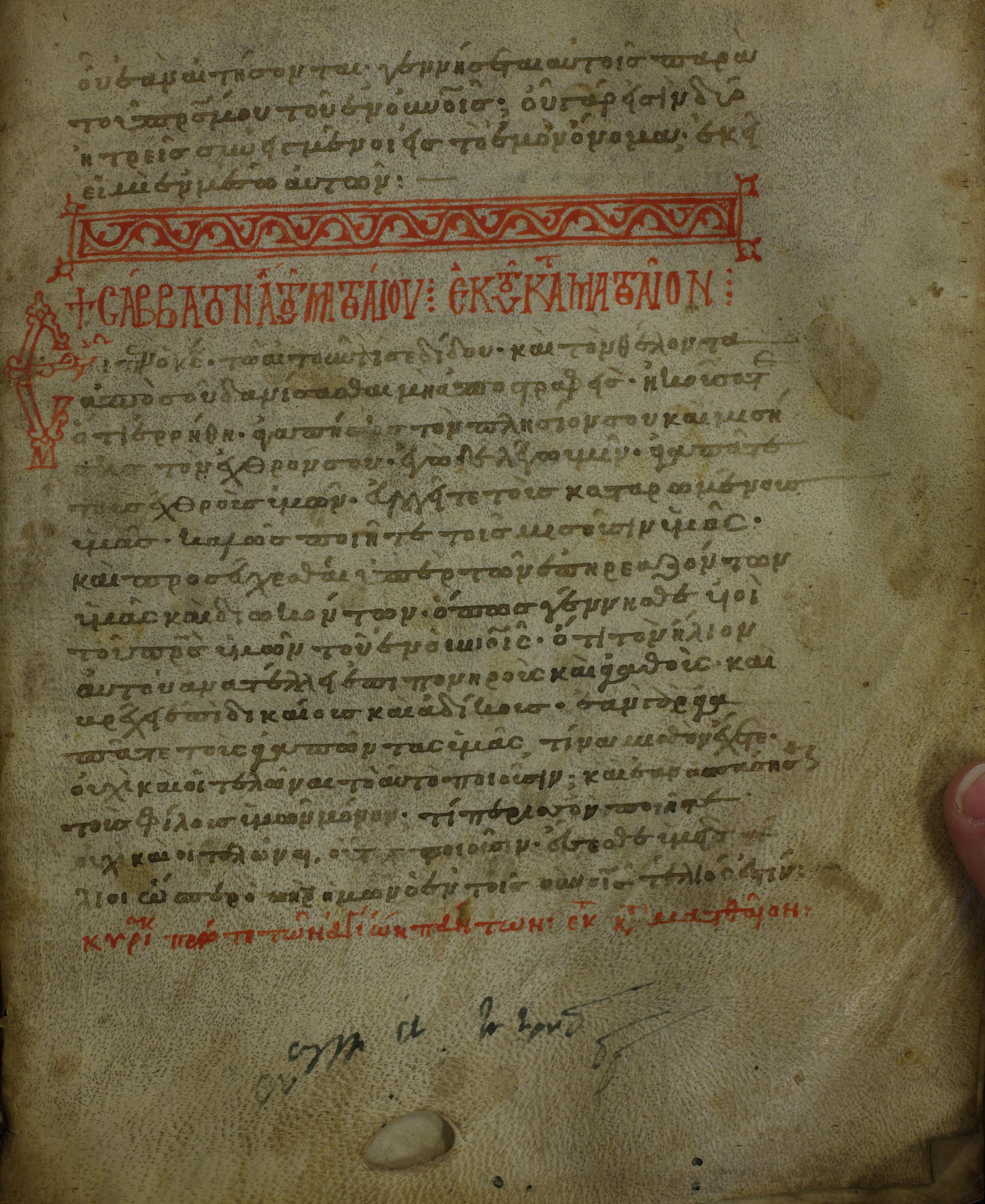
Folio 6 recto

Scrivener dated the manuscript to the 13th century, Gregory dated it to the 14th century. It has been assigned by the Institute for New Testament Textual Research to the 14th century.

Of the early history of the codex nothing is known until the year 1864, when it was in the possession of a dealer at Janina in Epeiros. It was then purchased from him by a representative of Baroness Burdett-Coutts (1814–1906), a philanthropist, along with other Greek manuscripts. They were transported to England in 1870-1871. The manuscript was presented by Burdett-Coutts to Sir Roger Cholmely's School, and was housed at the Highgate (Burdett-Coutts III. 52), in London.

The manuscript was added to the list of New Testament manuscripts by Scrivener (number 250) and Gregory (number 227). Gregory saw it in 1883. In 1922 it was acquired for the University of Michigan. The manuscript was described by K. W. Clark.

The manuscript is not cited in the critical editions of the Greek New Testament (UBS3).

The codex is housed at the University of Michigan (Ms. 32) in Ann Arbor, Michigan.

== See also ==
- List of New Testament lectionaries
- Biblical manuscript
- Textual criticism

== Bibliography ==
- Kenneth W. Clark, A Descriptive Catalogue of Greek New Testament Manuscripts in America (Chicago, 1937), pp. 309-310.
