= Chapel of St. Cornelius the Centurion =

Episcopalian chapel in New York City

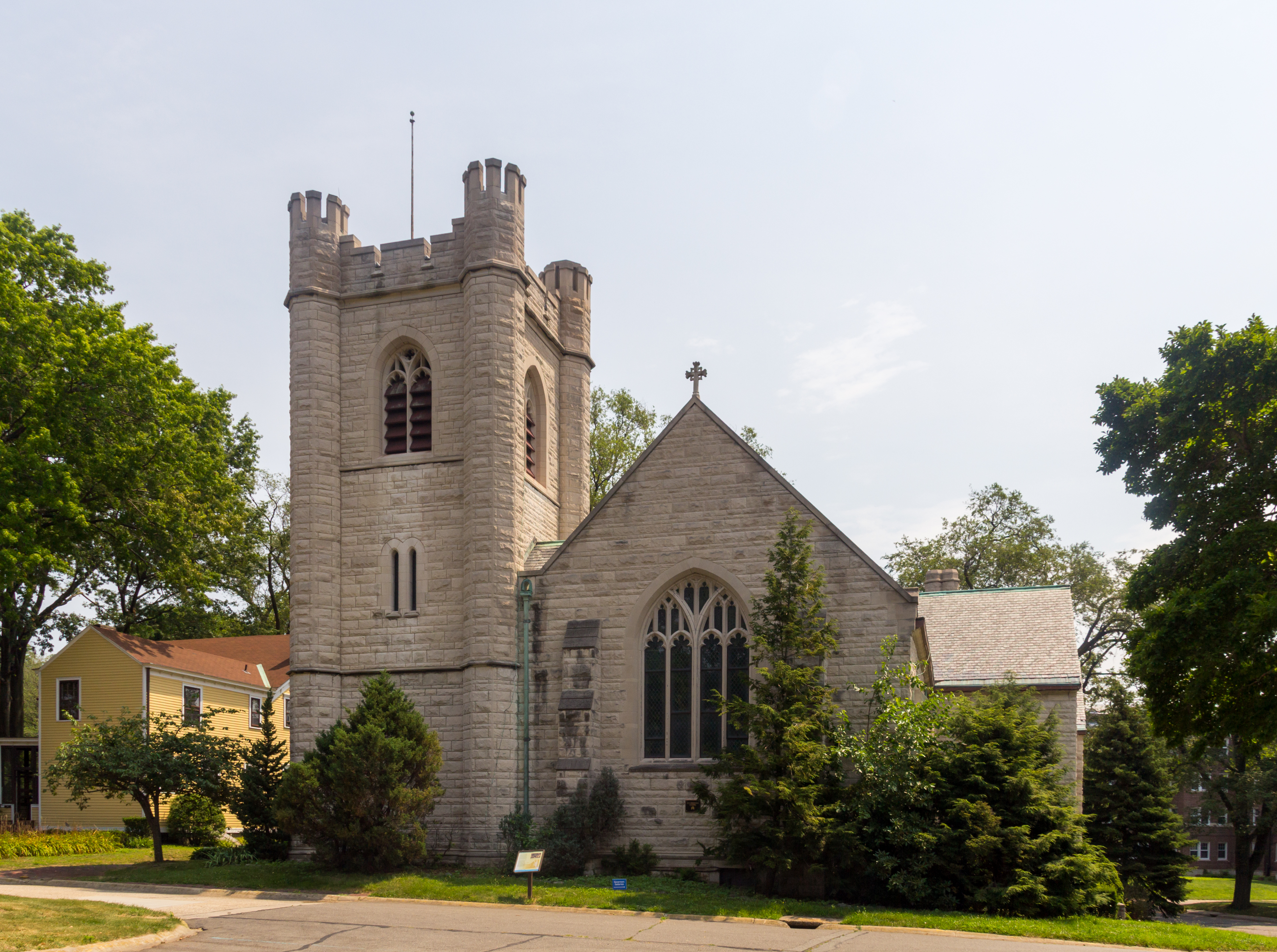
- The chapel in 2012
- Chapel of St. Cornelius the Centurion
- 40°41′18″N 74°0′53″W
- Location: Governors Island, New York City, US
- Country: United States
- Denomination: Episcopal Church

History
- Status: Chapel
- Dedication: Cornelius the Centurion
- Dedicated: October 19, 1906
- Earlier dedication: April 19, 1847 (original building)

Architecture
- Architect: Charles C. Haight
- Style: English Gothic; Gothic Revival
- Years built: 1905–1906

Specifications
- Materials: Limestone

Administration
- Province: 2
- Diocese: New York
- Parish: Trinity Church

The Chapel of St. Cornelius the Centurion is an Episcopal chapel on Governors Island in New York City, United States. It is part of the parish of Trinity Church in Manhattan and is dedicated in honor of Cornelius the Centurion. The first building to bear this name was erected in 1847 thanks to the efforts of John McVickar, who had been serving as a chaplain at Fort Columbus on Governors Island since 1844. (Note: The fort was renamed from Fort Columbus to Fort Jay in 1904.) By the beginning of the 20th century, this building was condemned and replaced by the current building, which was designed by architect Charles C. Haight and dedicated in 1906. The building was constructed in the English Gothic and Gothic Revival architectural styles.

For various periods in its history, chaplains have been provided from different sources, including from Trinity Church, the Army's chaplain services, and the United States Navy Chaplain Corps. Since the closure of the military outpost on Governors Island in 1996, the building has been under the sole ownership of Trinity Church. In the 21st century, the building has served as a venue for performing arts and art installations. As of 2014, it did not hold religious services.

== History ==
=== Early history ===
In 1844, The Reverend John McVickar, a professor at Columbia College and Episcopalian priest, accepted an offer to serve as a chaplain at Fort Columbus on Governors Island. McVickar initially held religious services in an office building, but in 1847, with support from Major General Winfield Scott, he formulated plans for a dedicated chapel building at the fort. He did not receive government funding for the building, but was able to raise money via donations from churchgoers in Manhattan. McVickar also donated a significant amount of his own money towards the building's erection. The building, designed by McVickar, was dedicated as the Chapel of St. Cornelius the Centurion by Bishop William H. DeLancey of the Episcopal Diocese of Western New York on April 19, 1847. The construction cost several thousand dollars. (Note: Sources vary on the cost of construction. In a 1950 book on the history of Trinity Church's parish, John A. Dix, the senior warden of Trinity Church, stated that the construction cost approximately $2,500 ($86,400 in 2025). However, in a 1973 book, journalist Clifford Phelps Morehouse gave the cost as roughly $4,500 ($155,500 in 2025). Both of these values are significantly lower than the cost of $25,000 ($864,000 in 2025) that McVickar gave in a letter written to his son during the building's construction.)

In 1850, McVickar's services expanded to include Bedloe's Island, where the Army had relocated some of the recruiting services. In 1862, following the outbreak of the American Civil War, the United States Army reworked its policy regarding chaplains, requiring civilian chaplains to reside permanently on their bases. Since McVickar was unable to reside permanently on the island, he resigned, with the Army stationing one of their own chaplains at the fort. He was initially succeeded by a man named Scudder, a minister of the Dutch Reformed Church, who retired in 1865. Scudder was replaced by James Armout Moore La Tourette of the Episcopal Church, who served until 1868.

=== Parish of Trinity Church ===
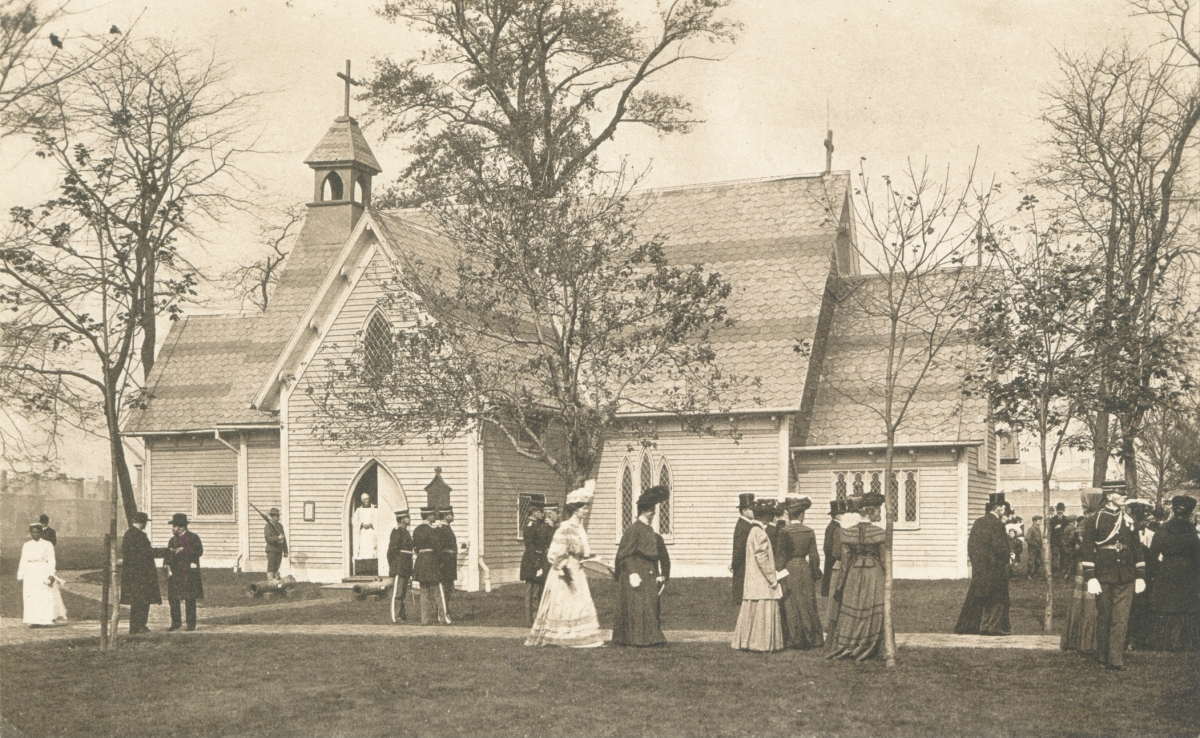
The original chapel building, c. 1900

The Army provided a military chaplain for the chapel for the duration of the war, but in 1868, they discontinued this program, stating that ministerial services should be provided by a local church elsewhere in New York City. That year, the clergy of Trinity Church, geographically one of the closest churches to the chapel, entered into an agreement with the United States Department of War wherein the church would maintain a chaplain on the island if the government provided housing and other necessities that they would normally provide to military chaplains. Additionally, Trinity Church would receive free use of the chapel building for their religious services. In a 1973 book on the parish's history, Episcopalian journalist Clifford Phelps Morehouse stated that the arrangement, which was formally agreed upon in August, was "unique among army posts". St. Cornelius was one of a number of chapels added to the parish in the late 1860s, alongside St. Augustine's and St. Chrysostom's.

=== Current chapel building ===
In the early 20th century, the chapel building was condemned, prompting the creation of a replacement building. Architect Charles C. Haight designed this new building. The cornerstone was laid on October 27, 1905, by Coadjutor Bishop David H. Greer of the Episcopal Diocese of New York. Coincidentally, Haight's father, Benjamin I. Haight, had previously served as an assistant minister at Trinity Church. Work was completed in 1906. On October 19 of that year, the building was consecrated by Bishop Greer in a ceremony attended by both clergy of Trinity Church and military officials. Greer substituted for Bishop Henry C. Potter, who was unable to preside over the consecration due to a recent death in his family. The sermon for the event was written by Morgan Dix, Trinity Church's rector, and read by assistant rector William T. Manning.

In November 1910, a military memorial service honoring American soldiers was held at the chapel, with several notable New Yorkers and members of the military in attendance. Current military officers included Major General Frederick Dent Grant of the Department of the East, and Lieutenant Colonels Adelbert Cronkhite, John A. Hull, and Isaac Littell, while retired military members included Asa Bird Gardiner, John White Moore, Charles Augustus Schermerhorn, and Andrew C. Zabriskie.

==== Military flags and trophies ====
Following the dedication, the chapel's vicar, Edmund Banks Smith, began a project to beautify the building by adding military flags and other decorations. In 1907, the church accepted five flags from the 1st Regiment of New York Volunteers that had been carried during the Mexican–American War. They were presented to the chapel by five veterans of that regiment in a large ceremony attended by representatives of various military and civic organizations, including the Society of the Cincinnati, the General Society of the War of 1812, the Aztec Club of 1847, and the Military Order of the Loyal Legion of the United States. Notable individuals present, either in a military capacity or as representatives of the organizations, included Major General Grant, Admiral Caspar F. Goodrich, F. Burrall Hoffman, Francis Key Pendleton, Herbert L. Satterlee, and Cornelius Vanderbilt III.

In 1915, The New York Times published an article discussing the flags kept at the chapel, which by that time numbered over fifty. Most of the larger flags were hung from the rafters in the nave, while flags from the Mexican–American War were hung in the south transept and the cavalry guidons were displayed in the choir. At the time, the oldest flag dated back to approximately 1787, while the most recent was a large American flag from the Boxer Rebellion. In 1921, the British Army donated a regimental color from the King's Royal Rifle Corps to the chapel as a gesture of goodwill between the United Kingdom and the United States. By 2010, the chapel housed 87 battle flags.

=== Army chaplains ===
In 1924, Smith retired. Subsequently, the Army and Trinity Church came to a new agreement regarding the chapel's vicars. The Army would provide a military chaplain for the chapel who would be a priest in the Episcopal Church and would subsequently be made an honorary vicar of Trinity Church. This arrangement existed for the duration of the Army's presence on the island. In 1955, the first man was commissioned into the United States Army Nurse Corps in a ceremony at the chapel.

=== Navy chaplains ===
On December 31, 1965, the Army closed its fort on Governors Island; the United States Coast Guard planned to use the facility starting the following June. Around that time, a historical plaque was erected outside the chapel. In the interim, the current Army vicar remained at the post until the Coast Guard took over. Chaplains were subsequently supplied by the United States Navy Chaplain Corps, with the same agreement in place with Trinity that resulted in these chaplains being named honorary vicars.

Starting in the 1970s, Trinity Church began to face financial difficulties that affected its administration of the chapel. In 1976, Trinity Church paid for a new lighting system for the chapel, but this would be the last major investment in the building for a decade. Following this, the building went into a state of disrepair, needing roof repairs and improvements to its pipe organ system. According to The New York Times, Trinity Church found it difficult to finance repairs because the building was located on government property, while the government was unable to help with repairs due to regulations regarding privately owned structures. In 1980, the church began to lease the chapel to the government for $1 (equivalent to $3.91 in 2025) per year.

In March 1986, Trinity Church agreed to turn over ownership of the building to the government, with a provision that the church would regain ownership if the building were not used for religious purposes. According to The Reverend Norman L. Cram Jr., the chaplain, "It's a necessary move, because the government has to own the chapel in order to put money into it. And the building really ought to be maintained by the government since it is used exclusively by government employees." At the time, the building was valued at approximately $3 million ($8.8 million in 2025). The move was also part of a larger series of divestitures by Trinity Church going back to the 1970s, when the church began to suffer financially. By the end of the year, the only chapel under Trinity's purview would be St. Paul's Chapel.

=== Fort closure and recent history ===
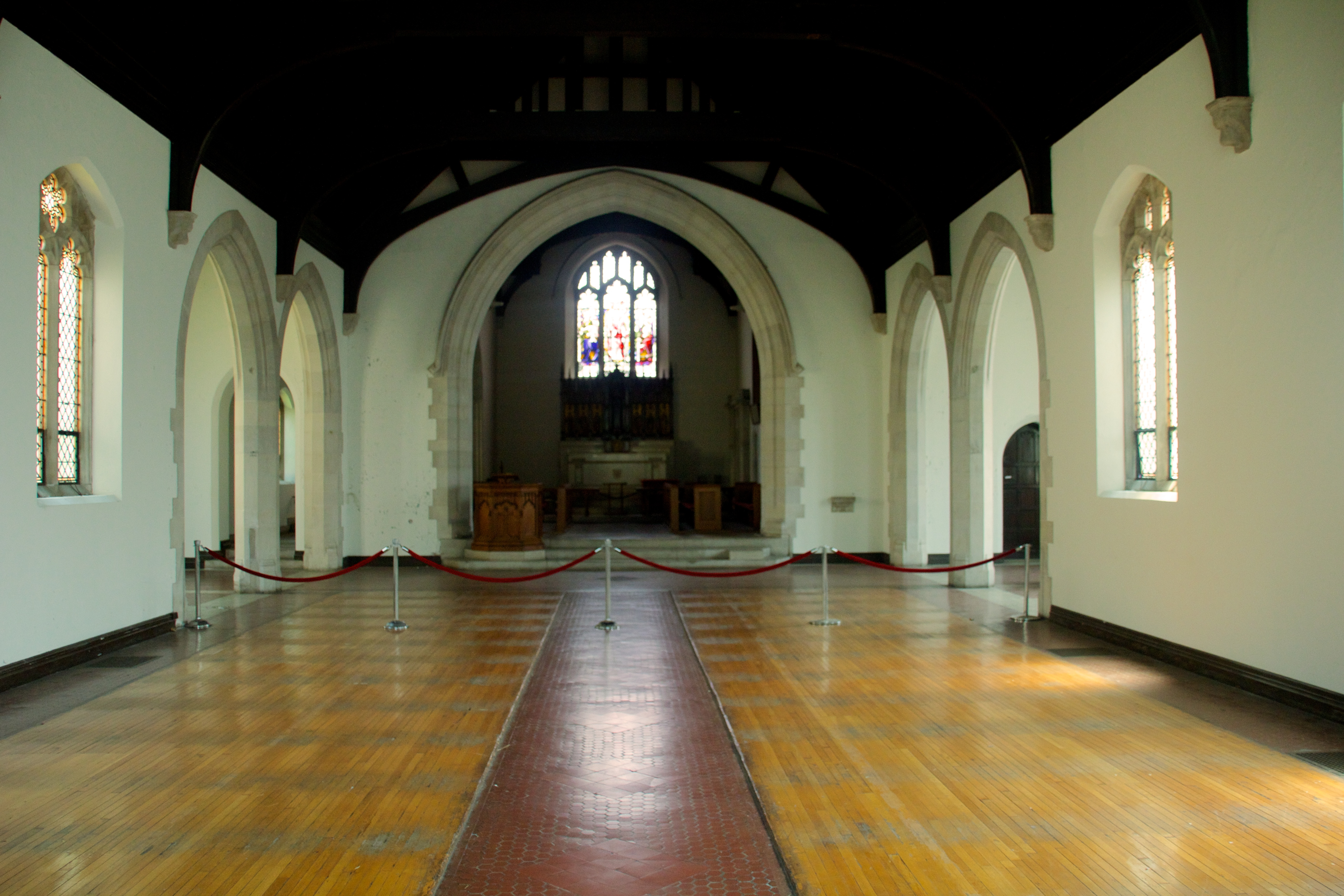
The chapel (interior pictured 2012) has hosted numerous public events in the 21st century, including several art installations.

In 1996, the New York City Landmarks Preservation Commission declared the part of the island that included the chapel as the Governors Island Historic District. That same year, the Coast Guard ceased use of the island and, as a result, the chapel came back under the ownership of Trinity Church.

In 2005, the island opened to the public as a park. Since then, the chapel has been used for a number of public events. In 2008, the chapel held screenings as part of that year's African Film Festival. A year later, the nonprofit group Creative Time held an expansive free art exhibition on the island. Anthony McCall installed a light art piece inside the chapel and Klaus Weber displayed a wind chime outside the building. In 2014, the Reggie Wilson/Fist and Heel Performance Group held a stage production at the chapel. By that year, the chapel was only one of two in the parish of Trinity Church, though it was not in active use. Gia Kourlas of The New York Times described the building at that time as having "crumbling white walls". In 2018, the chapel was host to "The Eclipse", an art installation by Jacob Hashimoto that consisted of thousands of paper kites displayed throughout the building.

== Design ==
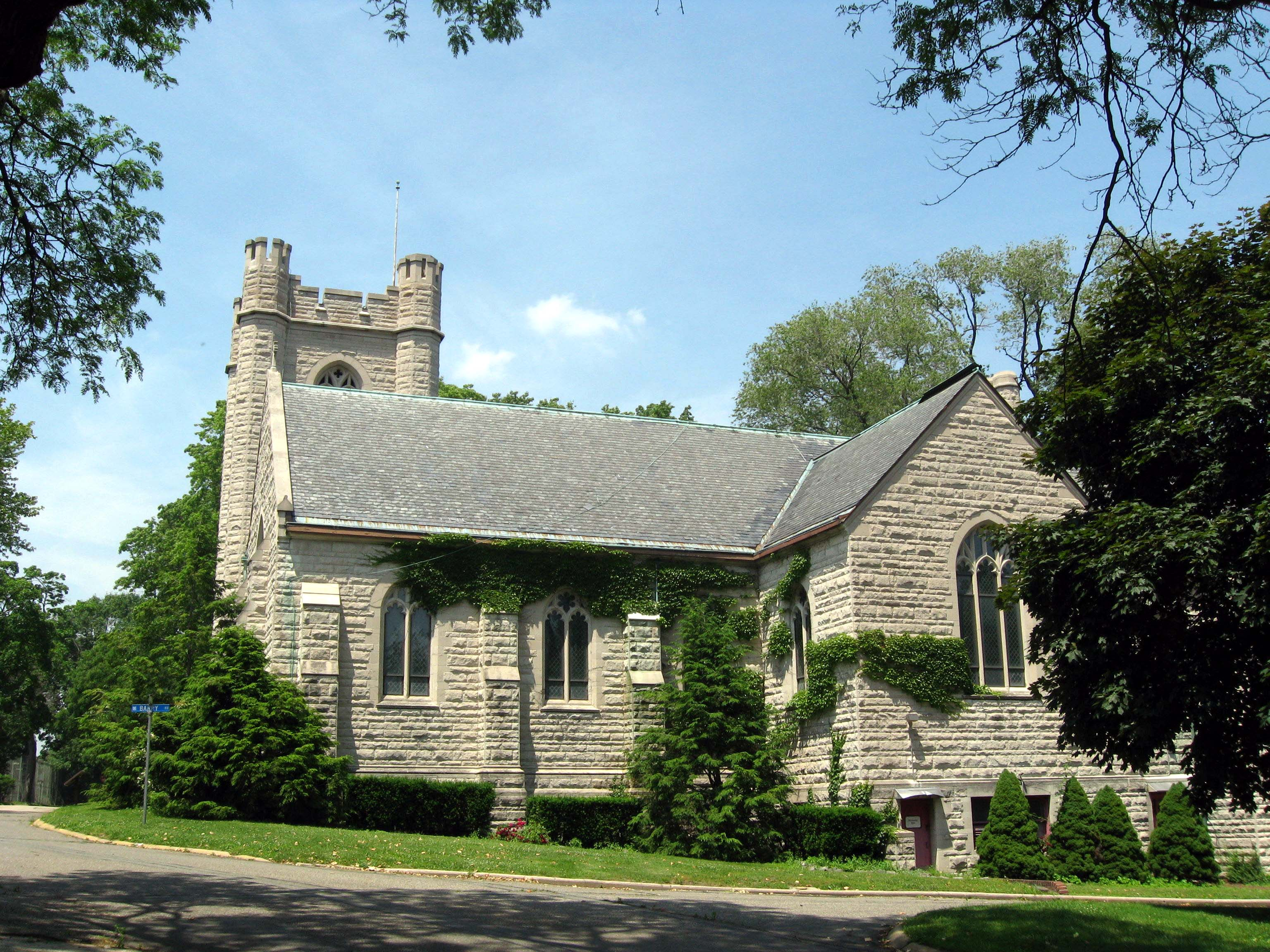
The chapel in 2008

The chapel's architectural style has been described as both English Gothic and Gothic Revival. The exterior is clad in coursed and rusticated limestone. The overall shape of the building is generally cruciform, and it has length and width measurements of approximately 106 feet (32 m) by 70 ft (21 m). The northwest corner has a three-story square tower containing the main entrance at ground level, while a four-turret parapet caps it. The roof is made of slate and features copper finishings, including rain gutters. There are 35 stained glass windows, many of which are lancet-shaped. On the east side of the building is the cornerstone, which bears the inscription "A.D. 1905".

The interior of the building consists of white walls and houses a pipe organ. Additionally, there are three sedilia located in the sanctuary. Of these, the main one is dedicated to McVickar, and the other two are dedicated to fellow vicars Davidson and La Tourette. McVickar's sedilia bears the following inscription:

In / Memory of / John McVickar / Priest and Doctor / Born 1787, Died 1868 / Chaplain of this Post / 1844–1862 / By whose wisdom and / liberality the first / Chapel of St. Cornelius / the Centurion was / erected in 1846 / The law of truth / was in his mouth, / and iniquity / was not found in / his lips.

La Tourette's sedilia says the following:

In / Memory of / James Armour Moore / La Tourette / Priest. / Born 1826. Died 1891. / Chaplain of this / Post, / 1865–1868. / Faithful in the dis- / charge of duty, notably / in the siege of Asiatic / cholera of 1866. / Instant in season / Out of season.

Finally, Davidson's bears the following inscription:

In Memory of the Rev. / Alexander Davidson / Chaplain at Fort Columbus / New York Harbor / Who died of Yellow Fever / Sept. A. D. 1870. / Though absent on sick leave when the disease broke out he came back, and while ministering to the sick and dying, was himself struck down and thus gave his life for his Brethren.

The chapel is located near the intersection of Barry Road and Evans Road, at the west end of Nolan Park.

== Sources ==
- Boyer-Dry, Margot; Rao, Tejal (May 31, 2018). "Things to Do in N.Y.C.: A Visit to Governors Island and the Botanical Garden in the Bronx". The New York Times. ISSN 1553-8095. OCLC 1645522. Archived from the original on November 29, 2022.
- Chorley, E. Clowes, ed. (1947). Quarter of a Millennium: Trinity Church in the City of New York, 1697–1947. Church Historical Society. Richmond, Virginia: Richmond Press Inc.
- Dix, John A. (1950). Lewis, Leicester C. (ed.). A History of the Parish of Trinity Church in the City of New York. Vol. V.: The Rectorship of Dr. Morgan Dix. New York City: Columbia University Press.
- Dolkart, Andrew S.; Postal, Matthew A. (2004). Guide to New York City Landmarks. New York City Landmarks Preservation Commission (3rd ed.). New York City: John Wiley & Sons, Inc. ISBN 978-0-471-71448-4. OCLC 1016111932.
- Graeber, Laurel (August 8, 2008). "Spare Times". The New York Times. ISSN 1553-8095. OCLC 1645522. Archived from the original on September 11, 2025.
- Hansen, Laura; Pearson, Marjorie (June 18, 1996). Pearson, Marjorie (ed.). Governors Island Historic District (PDF) (Report). New York City Landmarks Preservation Commission. Archived from the original (PDF) on February 3, 2017.
- Kilgannon, Corey (July 16, 2009). "New York's Island Haven, Secret No More". The New York Times. ISSN 1553-8095. OCLC 1645522. Archived from the original on November 26, 2022.
- Kourlas, Gia (June 27, 2014). "Prophet Goes to Church". The New York Times. ISSN 1553-8095. OCLC 1645522. Archived from the original on June 16, 2022.
- McDermon, Daniel (May 25, 2018). "8 Outdoor Art Installations in New York to Get Excited About". The New York Times. ISSN 1553-8095. OCLC 1645522. Archived from the original on September 5, 2025.
- Morehouse, Clifford P. (1973). Trinity: Mother of Churches: An Informal History of Trinity Parish in the City of New York. Foreword by Robert Ray Parks. New York City: Seabury Press. ISBN 978-0-8164-0246-5. OCLC 636466.
- "Tattered War Flags Put in Army's Care; Five Veterans of the Mexican Struggle Carry Them into Governors Island Chapel. Followed Them in Battle Two of the Old Soldiers Supported by Younger Men in Short March to the Services at Army Post". The New York Times. November 18, 1907. ISSN 1553-8095. OCLC 1645522. Archived from the original on September 11, 2025.
- "Governors Island Memorial Service; Chapel of St. Cornelius the Centurion Thronged with Civilians and Army Officers". The New York Times. November 14, 1910. ISSN 1553-8095. OCLC 1645522. Archived from the original on September 11, 2025.
- "Fifty Battle Flags Decorate a Church; Collection in Chapel of St. Cornelius the Centurion on Governors Island. Relics of Mexican War Other Banners from China and the Philippines -- Some Specimens Are Now Very Rare". The New York Times. July 25, 1915. ISSN 1553-8095. OCLC 1645522. Archived from the original on September 11, 2025.
- "Britain Sends Home Old Battle Colors; Flag of "Royal American Regiment" Hung by Chapel Altar on Governors Island. Field Marshal's Message Soldiers and Sailors of Both Nations and Guards in Uniform Attend the Ceremony". The New York Times. January 10, 1921. ISSN 1553-8095. OCLC 1645522. Archived from the original on September 11, 2025.
- "Army Commissions Male Nurse, First One in 54 Years of Corps; Swearing-In Closes a 14-Year Fight to Give Qualified Men Equal Status with Women". The New York Times. October 7, 1955. ISSN 1553-8095. OCLC 1645522. Archived from the original on January 29, 2025.
- "Church To Turn Over a Chapel on Governors I. To Coast Guard". The New York Times. March 9, 1986. ISSN 1553-8095. OCLC 1645522. Archived from the original on August 22, 2025.
- Sierzputowski, Kate (August 21, 2018). "Over Fifteen Thousand Paper Kites Create a Two-Toned Cloud Inside New York's St. Cornelius Chapel". Colossal. Archived from the original on September 1, 2025.
- Smith, Edmund Banks (1923). Governors Island: Its Military History Under Three Flags, 1637–1922. New York City: Valentine's Manual Inc.
- Smith, Roberta (June 25, 2009). "Island as Inspiration and Canvas". The New York Times. ISSN 1553-8095. OCLC 1645522. Archived from the original on February 21, 2025.
- "St. Cornelius the Centurion". TrinityChurchNYC.org. February 5, 2014. Archived from the original on May 16, 2025.
- Vogel, Carol (May 28, 2009). "A Milkmaid Prepares for a Lengthy Trip". The New York Times. ISSN 1553-8095. OCLC 1645522. Archived from the original on December 3, 2024.
- Walsh, Kevin (October 3, 2010). "Governors Island". Forgotten NY. Archived from the original on July 15, 2024.
- Walsh, Kevin (September 30, 2011). "St. Corny". Forgotten NY. Archived from the original on December 9, 2022.
- White, Norval; Willensky, Elliot; Leadon, Fran (2010). AIA Guide to New York City (5th ed.). Oxford: Oxford University Press. ISBN 978-0-19-538386-7. OCLC 741499953.
