= Bernard Bergman =

American rabbi and businessman (1911–1984)

Bernard Bergman (September 2, 1911 – June 16, 1984) was an Orthodox rabbi and businessman who was best known for his operation of a large network of nursing homes and his conviction of Medicaid fraud in 1976. Bergman turned an inheritance of $25,000 into an empire of nursing homes valued at $24 million.

== Early life ==
Bergman was born to Shlomo Bergman and Gittel Leifer on September 2, 1911, in Romania. Shlomo was the son of Avraham Tzvi Bergman (1849–1918), Rabbi of Yasinya, a small town in what was then Maramureş, Hungary, now part of Zakarpattya, Ukraine. Gittel descended from a long line of Hasidic rabbis, most famous of whom was her grandfather, Mordechai Leifer of Nadvorna. The family immigrated to the United States in the 1920s, settling in Brooklyn. Bergman went to Mandatory Palestine, where he attended the Hebron Yeshiva in order to pursue his religious studies. He received his semikhah (rabbinic ordination) from the academy's dean, Moshe Mordechai Epstein, on October 22, 1933. Bergman married Anne (née Weiss) in 1937. Back in New York City, he took a position as a rabbi at a nursing home on the Lower East Side of Manhattan and served as editor and publisher of the Yiddish-language daily The Jewish Morning Journal and head of Hapoel HaMizrachi.

== Nursing homes and criminal prosecution ==
Bergman started to build his network of nursing homes in the 1960s, beginning with the former New York Cancer Hospital on Central Park West at 106th Street, which was acquired in 1955 and operated by Bergman as the Towers Nursing Home. The home became the center of federal and state fraud charges. Claims were made that patients in the home were abused and neglected, with residents testifying that they had not been given adequate heat, and had been subjected to physical abuse and pest infestations. The site was closed in 1974 as a nursing home.

A New York State Senate investigation in 1975 brought witnesses who testified of patients lapsing into comas due to untreated dehydration, bedsores caused by coarse sheets and failure to notify authorities of an epidemic of diarrhea. An unannounced inspection of a home found unsanitary conditions, including milk used a week past its expiration date and excrement on the floors in patient rooms. Bergman vigorously denied the charges, claiming that the homes he operated were well run.

In 1976, Bergman was sentenced to serve four months in a Federal correction center after his conviction on Medicare and tax fraud charges. Under a plea bargain, he was supposed to not serve additional jail time. However, the lead prosecutor, Charles J. Hynes, compromised the plea agreement by publicly informing the media that he wanted the presiding judge (Judge Melia) to sentence Bergman to more jail time. Eventually, Bergman ended up serving an eight-month sentence for convictions on state offenses.

In February 1989, New York State's special nursing-homes prosecutor received payment of almost $1.4 million as the final payment of penalties and interest that Bergman was obligated to pay New York State after he pleaded guilty to Medicaid and tax fraud.

== Death ==
Bergman died of a heart attack at Mount Sinai Medical Center on June 16, 1984. He left residences in both Israel and Manhattan at the time of his death. His body was transported to Israel for burial.
