= St. John the Baptist Church (Wakefield, New Hampshire) =

Historic church in New Hampshire, United States

- St. John's Church, Rectory, and Parish Hall
- U.S. National Register of Historic Places
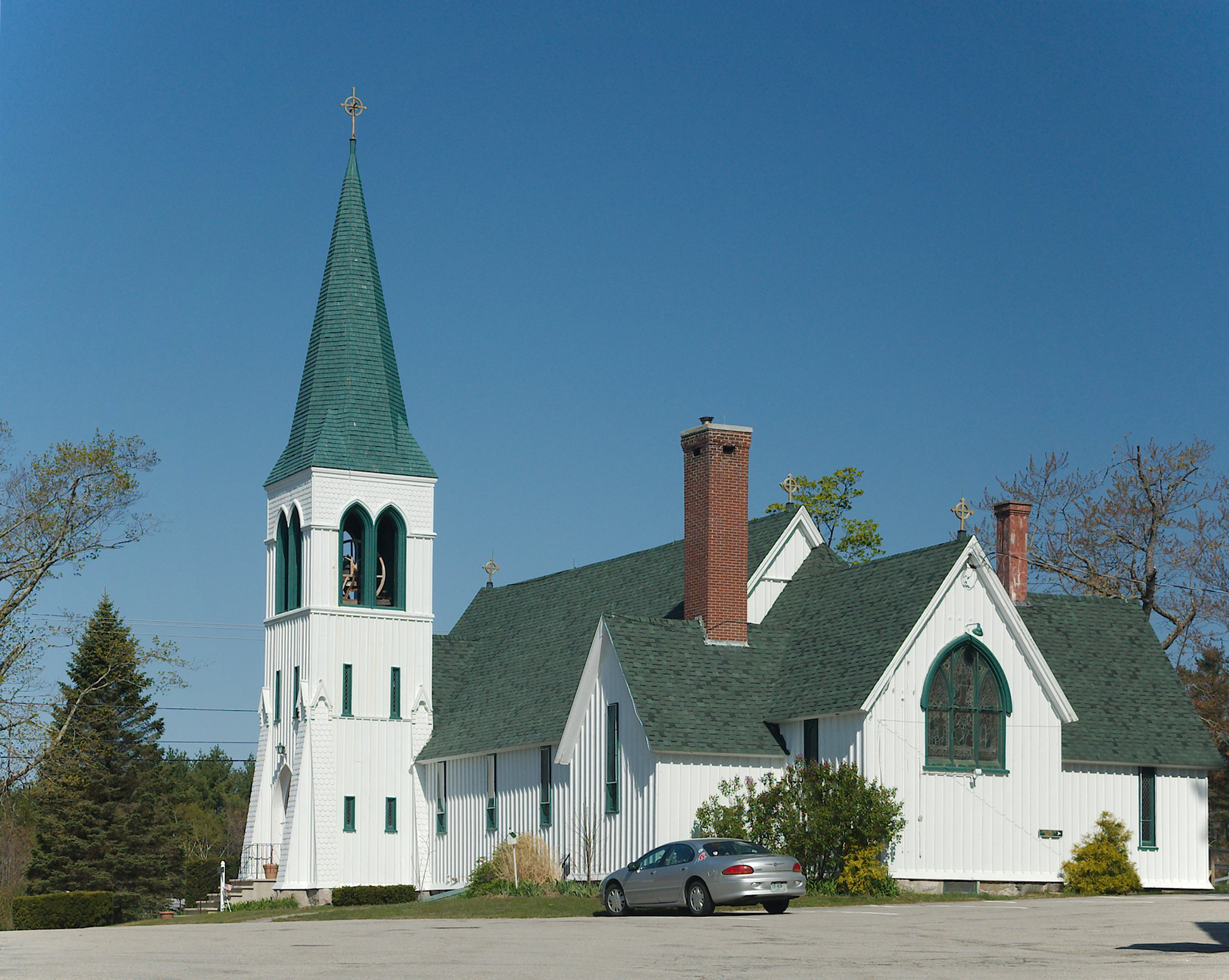
- St. John the Baptist Church

- Location within New Hampshire Location within the United States
- Location: 118 High Street, Sanbornville, Wakefield, New Hampshire
- Coordinates: 43°33′27″N 71°01′46″W
- Area: 3.3 acres (1.3 ha)
- Built: 1876-1877
- Architect: Haight, Charles C.
- Architectural style: Gothic Revival
- NRHP reference No.: 84002519
- Added to NRHP: June 7, 1984

St. John the Baptist Church is a historic Episcopal church located at 118 High Street in the Sanbornville village of Wakefield, New Hampshire, in the United States. Built 1876–77, it is a prominent regional example of Carpenter Gothic architecture. It was listed on the National Register of Historic Places in 1984.

The church reported 194 members in 2016 and 99 members in 2023; no membership statistics were reported in 2024 parochial reports. Plate and pledge income reported for the congregation in 2024 was $93,229 with average Sunday attendance (ASA) of 32 persons.

== Architecture and history ==
St. John's occupies a triangular lot on the north side of Sanbornville village, bounded by High Street, Wakefield Road (New Hampshire Route 153), and St. John Street. The church is located near the center of the parcel, and is oriented facing west toward High Street; to its south is the rectory, also facing High Street, and the parish hall is on the east side of the lot, oriented at an angle to the other two buildings in order to properly face Wakefield Street.

Designed by Charles C. Haight, the church building is an example of Gothic Revival architecture. It is one of the architect's earlier works, and is clearly based in part on a design for country churches published by Richard Upjohn in his 1852 book Rural Architecture, but with more elaborate flourishes. It has an asymmetrical cruciform plan with a tower projecting to the right of its street-facing facade. The rectory was added in 1881, and the parish hall in 1894; both are vernacular expressions of late Victorian architecture.

The church was built in 1876–77, to fulfill the dying wish of Mrs. Josiah Low, a bequest that was seen through by her granddaughter, with additional funds donated by other members of the Low family. The church was consecrated on September 14, 1877, by the Rt. Rev. William Woodruff Niles, the third bishop of the Episcopal Diocese of New Hampshire. Originally set on a much smaller lot, further gifts from the Low family made possible the acquisition of the full 3.3 acres (1.3 ha) it now owns, as well as the construction of the rectory. The church was a mission of the Episcopal Diocese of New Hampshire until it achieved parish status on June 14, 1961.

== See also ==
- National Register of Historic Places listings in Carroll County, New Hampshire
- St. John the Baptist Church (disambiguation)
