= New York Cancer Hospital =

Hospital building in Manhattan, New York

- U.S. National Register of Historic Places
- New York State Register of Historic Places
- New York City Landmark
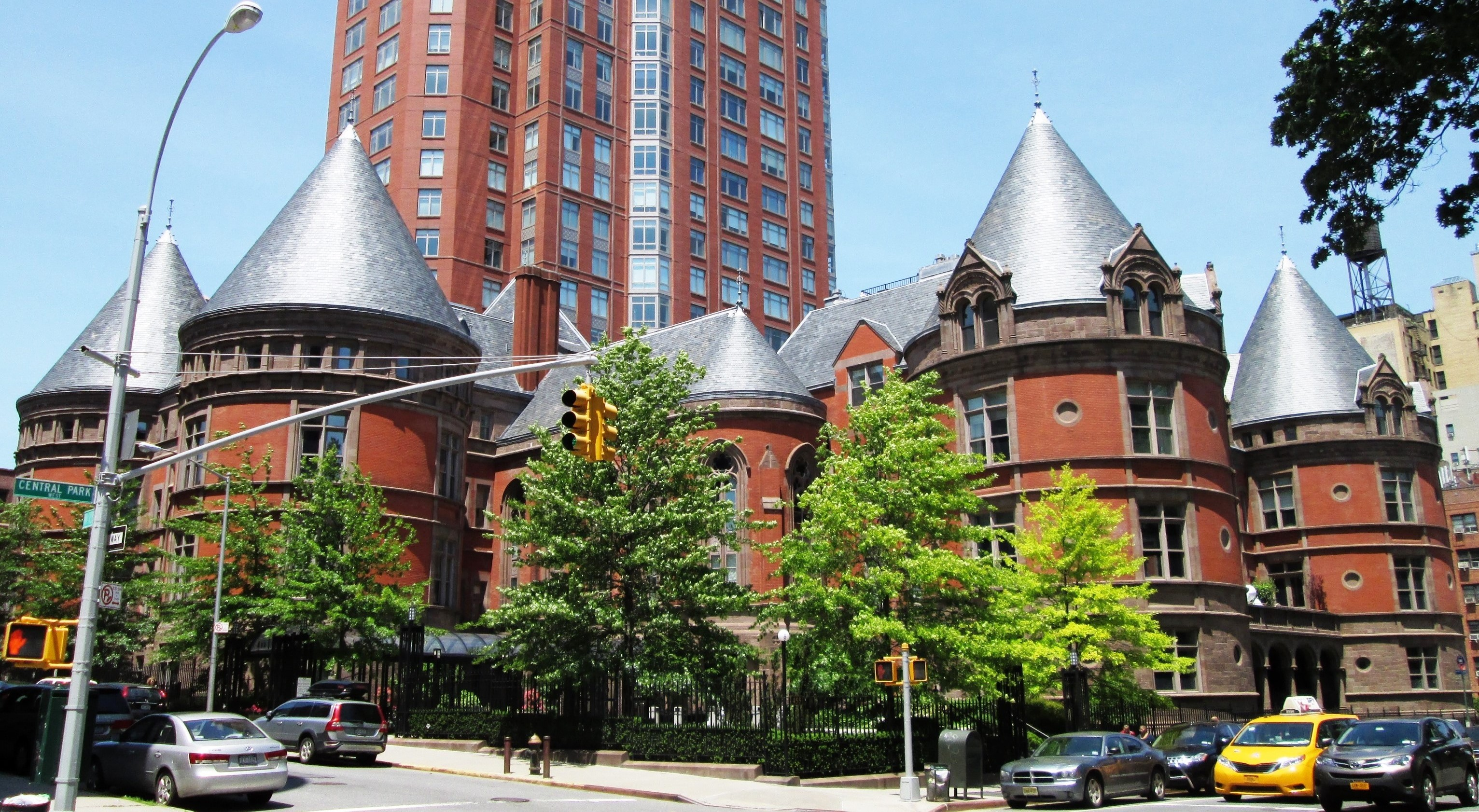
- (2015)

- Location within Manhattan Location within New York City Location within New York Location within the United States
- Location: 455 Central Park West between West 105th and 106th Streets; Manhattan, New York City
- Coordinates: 40°47′52″N 73°57′39″W
- Built: 1884–86, additions: 1889–90
- Architect: Charles Coolidge Haight
- Architectural style: Late Gothic Revival, French Chateau
- NRHP reference No.: 77000961
- NYSRHP No.: 06101.001753
- NYCL No.: 0938

Significant dates
- Added to NRHP: April 29, 1977
- Designated NYSRHP: June 23, 1980
- Designated NYCL: August 17, 1976

The New York Cancer Hospital (NYCH) on the Upper West Side of Manhattan, New York City was a cancer treatment and research institution founded in 1884. The building was located at 455 Central Park West between West 105th and 106th Streets, and built between 1884 and 1886 with additions made between 1889 and 1890; it was designed by Charles Coolidge Haight in the Late Gothic and French Chateau styles – inspired by the chateaux of the Loire Valley. It was the first hospital in the United States dedicated specifically for the treatment of cancer, and the second in the world after the London Cancer Hospital. After outgrowing the original building and moving, it became what is today known as Memorial Sloan-Kettering Cancer Center.

Around 1955, the hospital became Towers Nursing Home, and the building began its decline. It was designated a New York City landmark in 1976, was added to the National Register of Historic Places in 1977, and was converted into luxury condominium apartments in 2001–2005 designed by Perkins Eastman Architects.

== Beginning ==
Although he died before it opened, J. Marion Sims was much involved in the founding of the hospital. Sims had been president of the American Medical Association and was arguably the country's most famous physician. He had resigned as director of the first Woman's Hospital, which he had founded, when the hospital board forbade the admission of cervical cancer patients.

In the summer of 1884, former President Ulysses S. Grant developed throat cancer. He lived in a brownstone at 3 East 66th Street, and his ensuing decline caught the attention of the nation. Considered incurable, as well as contagious and shameful, Grant's death the following year brought awareness of the disease. Although his cancer was inoperable, others were more fortunate, since the development of anesthesia in the mid-19th century had finally given doctors a surgical treatment for cancer.

In the year of Grant's diagnosis, John Jacob Astor III, Elizabeth H. Cullum, John E. Parsons, Thomas A. Emmet, Joseph W. Drexel and other prominent New Yorkers laid the cornerstone for the New York Cancer Hospital, the country's first to devote itself exclusively to the care of cancer patients. Designed by Charles C. Haight and completed in 1887, the first portion of the hospital, designated solely for women, was at the southwest corner of 106th and Central Park West. At the dedication, Grant's physician, Fordyce Barker, said that cancer was not due to misery, to poverty, or bad sanitary surroundings, or to ignorance or to bad habits, but a disease afflicting the cultured, the wealthy and the inhabitants of salubrious localities."

In 1890 the hospital was expanded south, and in both sections Haight designed circular wards, about 40 feet (12 m) in diameter, in part to facilitate better observation by a nurse at a central desk and in part because the design offered more space between the heads of the beds. Ventilation was a key concern, so a duct ran up the centers of the wards to remove what was said to be intense odors caused by the disease. Haight worked the round wards into the exterior architecture, which he executed in deep red brick and soft brown Belleville brownstone, with great conical towers irregularly placed on the three fronts.

The big, broad towers gave the hospital the character of a French château, like the Château de Chambord at Chambord, Loir-et-Cher, France. It is said it would much more readily be taken for an art museum than for a hospital.

== Medical innovation ==
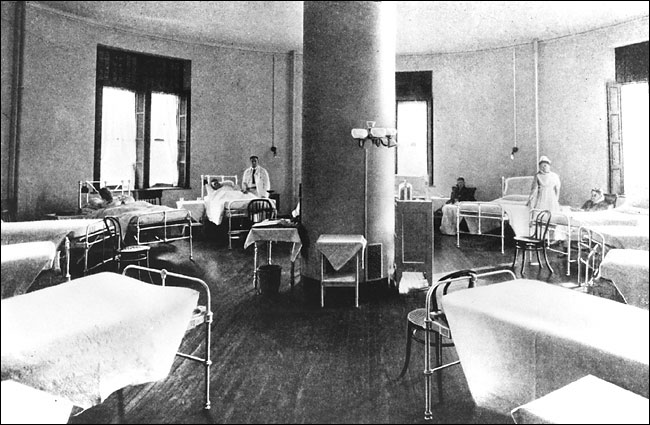
The concept in the 1880s was that germs and dirt in room corners were harboring ground for diseases, prompting the design of its circular wards towers.

During the hospital's inauguration, treatment for cancer was mostly palliative. The hospital offered what was considered the best treatments available for that time. Cancer treatment then meant, at best, easing pain and making the sufferer as comfortable as possible. Many patients came to the New York Cancer Hospital, in effect, to die, assuaged by morphine. Other forms of relief included carriage rides in Central Park and Sunday services in the hospital's Chapel of St. Elizabeth of Hungary, patron saint of the suffering.

From its beginnings, the NYCH seemed fraught with misfortune. Just months after laying the cornerstone to the new hospital, one of its primary benefactors, Elizabeth Hamilton Cullum, succumbed to uterine cancer. Coincidentally, John Jacob Astor's wife, Charlotte Augusta Astor also died of uterine cancer just a week shy of the hospital's grand opening in December 1887, missing her chance to be presumably cured. Due in part to his generous financial contributions to the facility, the New York Cancer Hospital's first wing was appropriately dedicated the "Astor Pavilion".

Inspired as much by modern medical theory as by 16th-century French châteaux, the architect Charles Haight's round towers were designed to deter germs and dirt from accumulating in sharp corners, which at the time was considered a harboring ground for disease. An air shaft ran vertically through the center of each tower to prevent air from stagnating in the wards. This design was considered the very latest in 19th-century ventilation technology: The New York Times commented in 1888 that "altogether, the[se] features marked a new departure in hospital construction and make this admirable structure a model of its kind."

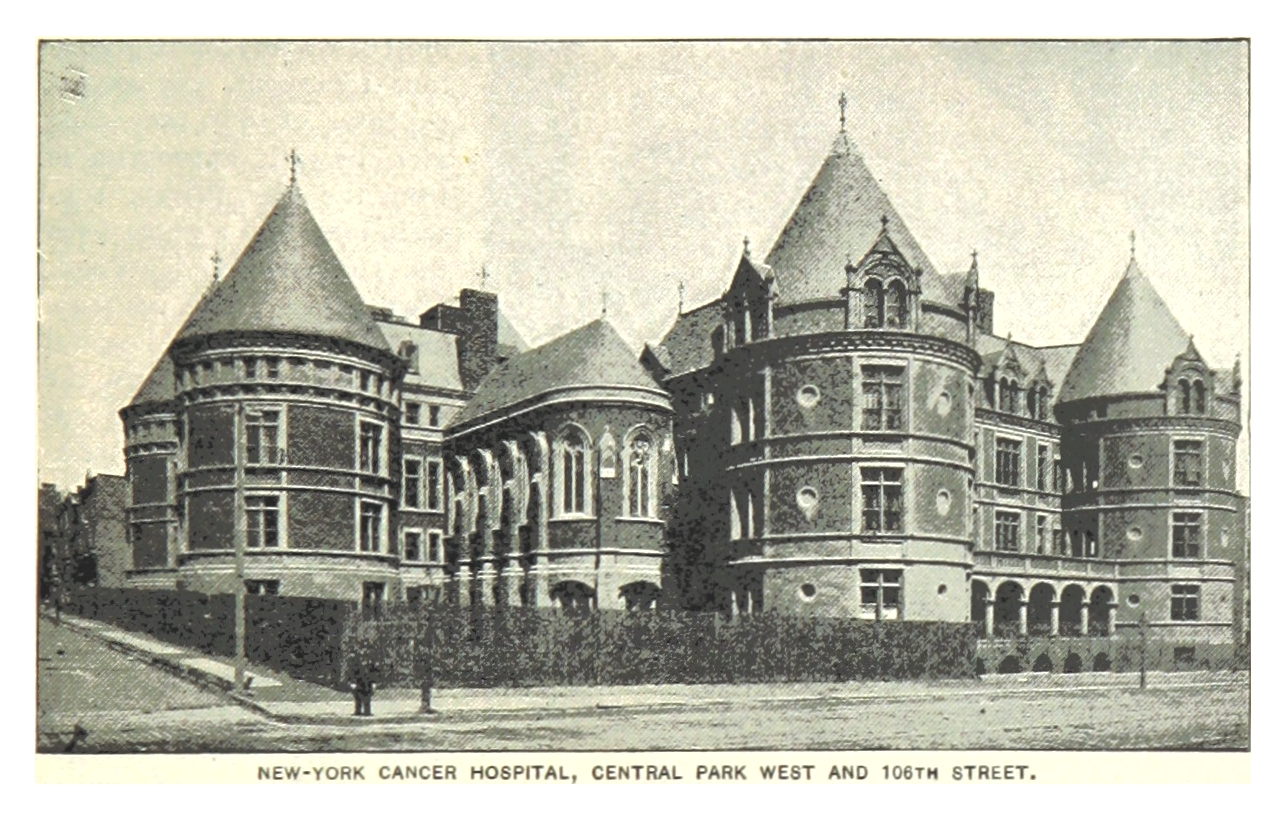
The hospital in 1893

The 20th century brought new techniques in cancer treatment, including radiation therapy. In 1921, Marie Curie visited the New York Cancer Hospital, by then renamed the General Memorial Hospital for the Treatment of Cancer and Allied Diseases, to see the brick and steel vault where the hospital kept its four grams of radium—at the time the largest accumulation in the world. Dr. Edward H. Rogers, who was escorting her, assured The Times that there is no case on record of anyone being injured in health by radium. He denied that Curie had been harmed by the radioactive material, saying she had been ill recently only from anemia. In this period the hazards of radium were beginning to emerge, sparking defensive claims by its proponents. She died in 1934, unsurprisingly due to radium poisoning. In retrospect, early radiation treatments were often worse than the disease they were meant to cure. Radiation caused severe burns and, in some cases, additional cancers. New York Cancer Hospital may have been hailed a success for its good intentions, but there was no end to the suffering of those within. Plagued by the growing death rate, the NYCH had its own crematorium located in the basement of the facility, all the more dreadful by the vision, through its gothic windows, of the tall smokestack to the west of the main building.

Largely because cancer remained so deadly, the hospital soon ran into financial troubles. It came to be known as "the Bastille," a place to be feared and avoided by patients and patrons. At the turn of the century, administrators of the beleaguered hospital changed its name to the General Memorial Hospital, and again in the early 1920s to the General Memorial Hospital for the Treatment of Cancer and Allied Diseases. Through the decades, the hospital endured its arduous dedication for its principal grounds of finding a cure for cancer.

In 1955, the General Memorial Hospital for the Treatment of Cancer and Allied Diseases moved out of the outdated Central Park West facility to its new location on the East Side. There it grew to become what is present day Memorial Sloan-Kettering Cancer Center. It was during this time that the former New York Cancer Hospital building began its decline. Under the new ownership of nursing home magnate Bernard Bergman, it was turned into a facility called Towers Nursing Home. The nursing home later became infamous for its negligence and lack of standards. The elderly patients testified to "atrocious conditions," including inadequate heat, pest infestations, physical abuse and negligence. The patients weren't the only ones being neglected either. The old facilities were unkempt, filthy, and a "pungent odor" filled the air. The once immaculate building became a sad derelict place. A state and federal investigation ensued following a probe into allegations of Medicaid and tax fraud that ultimately caused the home to close its doors in 1974. The former New York Cancer Hospital was left in such a disastrous condition following the closure of the nursing home that there were talks of demolition before the New York City Landmarks Preservation Commission designated the hospital building a historic landmark in 1976.

== Redevelopment ==
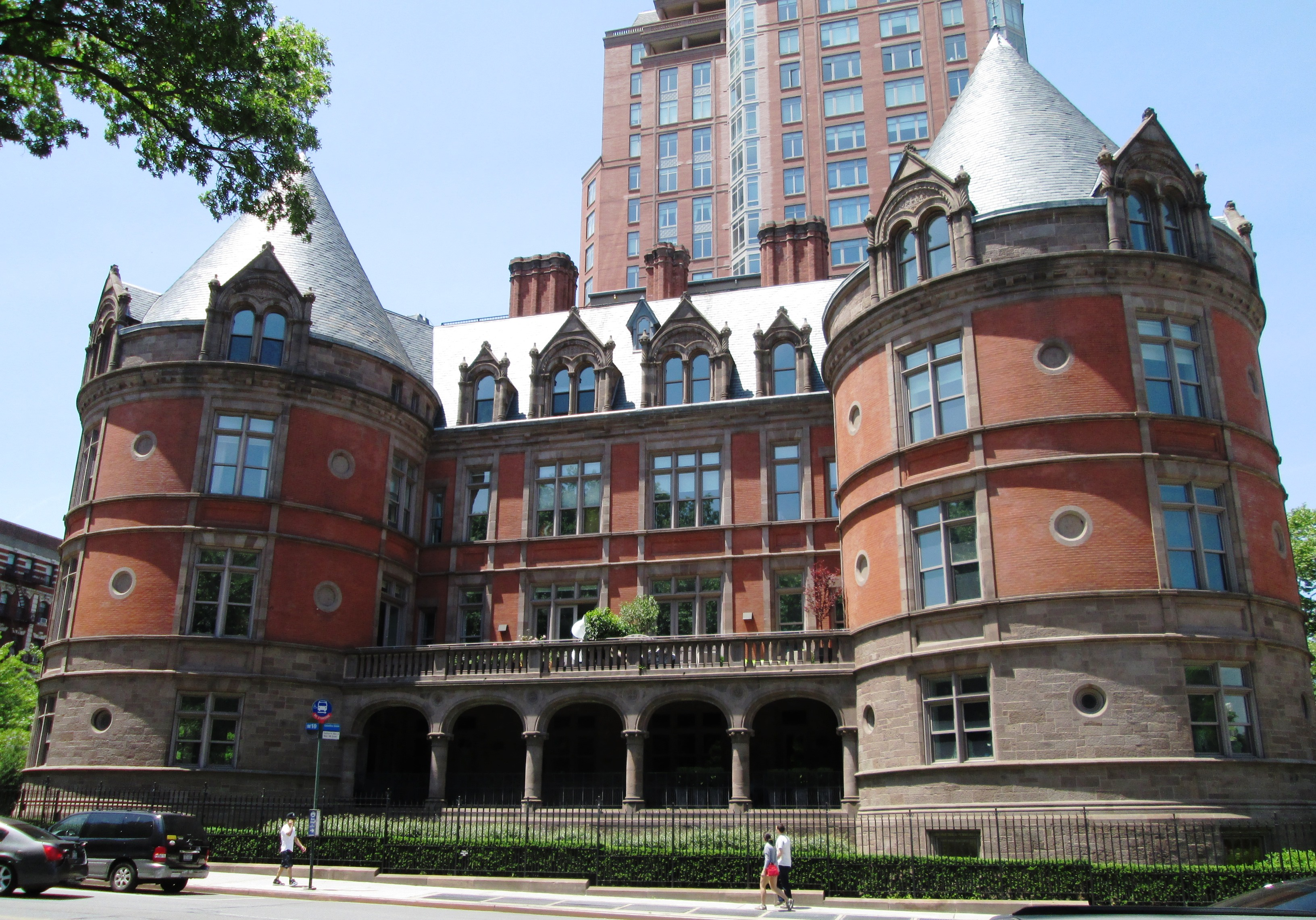
The building as seen from the east in 2015

The medical hospital, neglected, lay overgrown and vandalized for many decades. In the neighborhood the building became popularly known as "the castle" due to its gothic round towers. Through the years, many promising developers expressed interest in the decaying property. Among some of them were hotelier and real-estate developer Ian Schrager, best known as part owner of Studio 54, whose attempt to renovate the landmark into luxury apartments failed. The old hospital lay abandoned for nearly three decades until March 2000, when the Chicago-based developer MCL Companies and Arthur J. Halleran Jr. became involved. With generous financing, Daniel E. McLean, president and chief executive of the MCL Companies bought the property for $21 million and began construction. But like numerous predecessors he was forced to halt the work due to financial holdups following the September 11 attacks. McLean envisioned a plan that called for massive renovation of the old hospital remnant into modern luxury condominiums, including a new modern 26-story tower adjacent to the landmark building. Among the new tenants would be Columbia University, who bought several entire floors to use as residence to house senior faculty and visiting dignitaries. The purchase by Columbia, as well as a new construction loan, allowed McLean's project to get back on track after work was halted due to lack of money following 9/11.

By early 2005, conversion of the old landmark hospital into condominiums, now called 455 Central Park West, was completed, with units selling for as much as $7 million. The new apartments in the old hospital building highlight its distinct features, most notably cavernous circular rooms with lofty ceilings, while those in the new tower have splendid views overlooking Central Park. Tenants enjoy such amenities as a spa, indoor pool, and 24-hour concierge service. The building was, even then, reputed to be haunted.

== See also ==
- List of New York City Designated Landmarks in Manhattan from 59th to 110th Streets
- National Register of Historic Places listings in Manhattan from 59th to 110th Streets
