= Cornelius the Centurion =

First Gentile to convert to Christianity

Saint Cornelius the Centurion
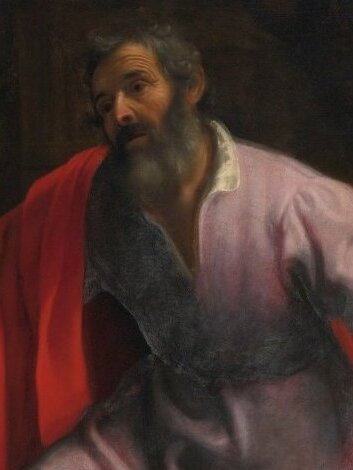
- Detail from Vision of the Centurion Cornelius by Zanobi Rosi, 17th cent.

The First Convert
- Born: unknown
- Died: unknown
- Venerated in: Roman Catholic Church; Eastern Orthodox Church; Anglican Communion; Armenian Apostolic Church
- Feast: 20 October, 2 February, 4 February, 7 February, 13 September
- Attributes: Roman military garb

Cornelius (Greek: Κορνήλιος, romanized: Kornḗlios; Latin: Cornēlius [kɔrˈneː.li.ʊs]; fl. 1st century AD) was a Roman centurion who is considered by some Christians to be the first Gentile to convert to the faith, as related in Acts of the Apostles (see Ethiopian eunuch for the competing tradition). The baptism of Cornelius is an important event in the history of the early Christian church. He may have belonged to the gens Cornelia, a prominent Roman family.

== Biblical account ==
Cornelius was a centurion in the Cohors II Italica Civium Romanorum, mentioned as Cohors Italica in the Vulgate. He was stationed in Caesarea Maritima, the capital of Roman Iudaea province. He is depicted in the New Testament as a God-fearing man who always prayed and was full of good works and deeds of alms. Cornelius receives a vision in which an angel of God tells him that his prayers have been heard; he understands that he has been chosen for a higher alternative. The angel then instructs Cornelius to send the men of his household to Joppa, where they will find Simon Peter, who is residing with a tanner by the name of Simon (Acts 10:5ff).

The conversion of Cornelius comes after a separate vision given to Simon Peter (Acts 10:10–16). In the vision, Simon Peter sees all manner of beasts and fowl being lowered from Heaven in a sheet. A voice commands Simon Peter to eat. When he objects to eating those animals that are unclean according to Mosaic Law, the voice tells him not to call unclean that which God has cleansed.

When Cornelius' men arrive, Simon Peter understands that through this vision the Lord had commanded him to preach the Word of God to the Gentiles. Peter accompanies Cornelius' men back to Caesarea. When Cornelius meets Simon Peter, he falls at Peter's feet. Simon Peter raises the centurion, and the two men share their visions. Simon Peter tells of Jesus' ministry and the Resurrection; the Holy Spirit descends on everyone at the gathering. The Jews among the group are amazed that Cornelius and other uncircumcised should begin speaking in tongues, praising God. Thereupon Simon Peter commands that Cornelius and his followers, "kinsmen and near friends", be baptized. The controversial aspect of Gentile conversion is taken up later at the Council of Jerusalem (Acts 15).

=== Religious situation of Judea ===
Taking into account that Judea had been within the Hellenic orbit since the conquest of Alexander the Great, there was time for wise men and philosophers, both Greek and Jewish, to exchange knowledge, thus beginning the syncretism between Hellenism and Judaism, a phenomenon that occurred in the rest of his empire. Later with the arrival of the Romans (already Hellenized), there were no problems of religious tolerance (except in the case of the Zealots), since thanks to the interpretatio graeca exported by the Macedonians, it was possible to identify Caelus (Roman god) or Uranus (his Greek equivalent) and Yahweh as the Supreme God, allowing conversion cases like Cornelius.

== Significance ==
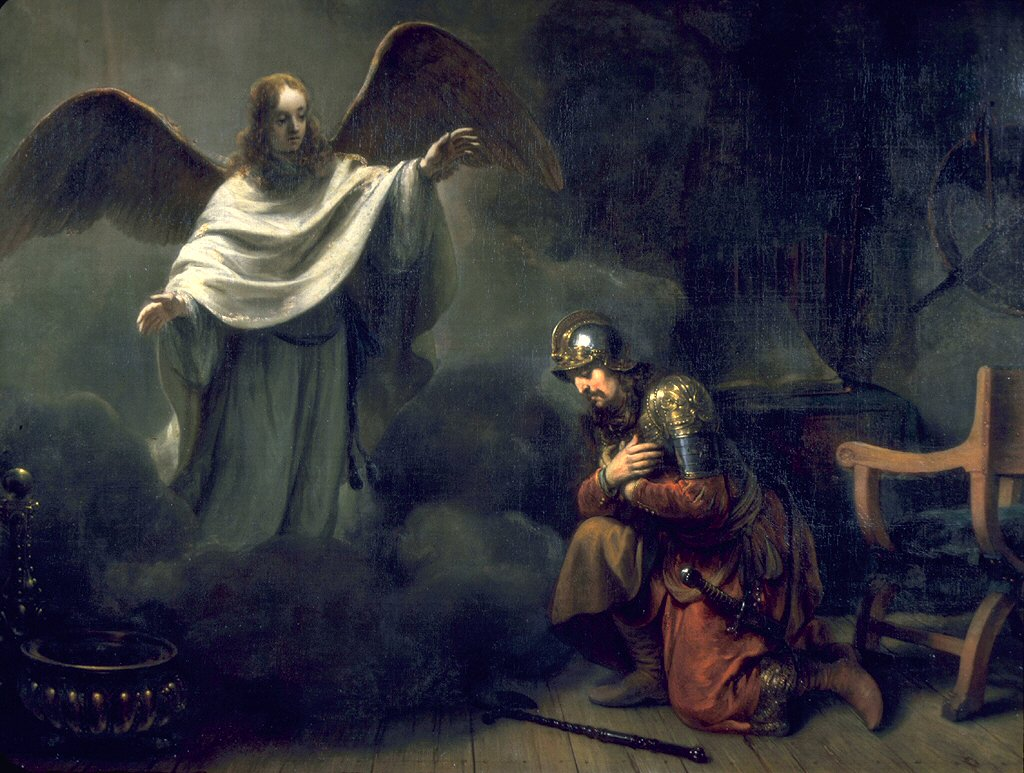
In this painting by Gerbrand van den Eeckhout, an angel appears to the Roman centurion Cornelius. The angel tells him to seek out St. Peter. The Walters Art Museum.

Can any man forbid water, that these should not be baptized, which have received the Holy Ghost as well as we?

— Acts 10:47

Cornelius is considered to be one of the first gentile converts to Christianity. The baptism of Cornelius is an important event in the history of the early Christian church, along with the conversion and baptism of the Ethiopian eunuch. The Christian church was first formed around the original disciples and followers of Jesus, all of whom—including Jesus—were Galilean, except for Judas who was Judean. Males in the Judean community were Jews: they were circumcised and observed the Law of Moses. The reception of Cornelius sparked a debate among the leaders of the new community of followers of Jesus, culminating in the decision to allow Gentiles to become Christians without conforming to Jewish requirements for circumcision, as recounted in Acts 15.

== Legacy ==
His feast day on the new Martyrologium Romanum is 20 October; the Catholic Church also commemorates him on 2 February. He is commemorated in the Orthodox tradition on 13 September. Cornelius is honored on the liturgical calendar of the Episcopal Church in the United States of America on 20 October. The Armenian Apostolic Church commemorates Cornelius on the Tuesday after the third Sunday of Advent.

Certain traditions hold Cornelius as becoming either the first bishop of Caesarea, or the bishop of Scepsis in Mysia. The Greek-French philosopher Cornelius Castoriadis was named after him. When Governors Island in New York City was a military installation, the Episcopal Church maintained a stone chapel there dedicated to him.

== Gallery ==
Images of St. Cornelius Chapel, Governors Island, New York

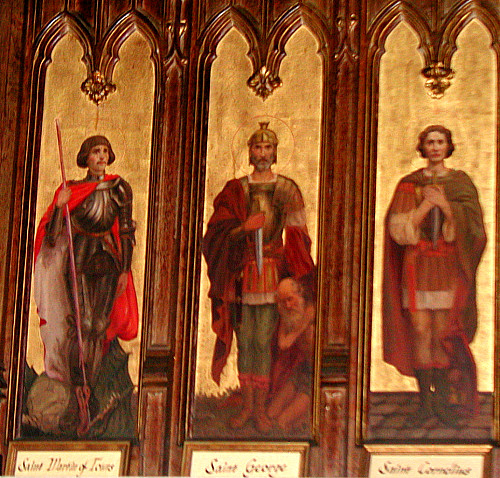
Three military saints in the reredos (Cornelius on the right)

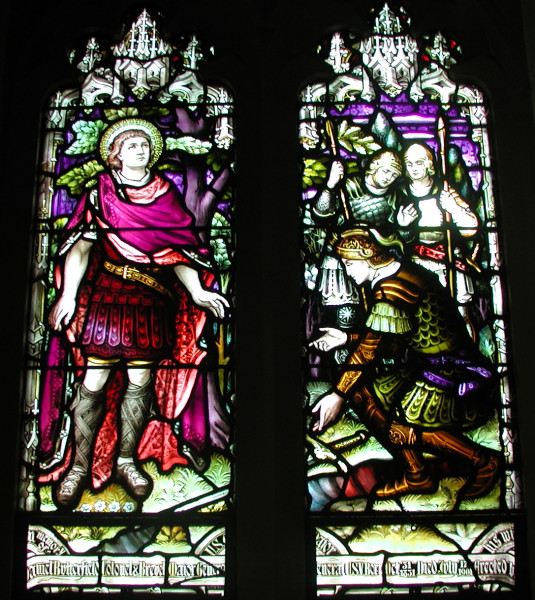
Stained glass window based on Acts 10

== See also ==
- Acts 10
- Biblical law in Christianity
- Chapel of St. Cornelius the Centurion
- Saint Cornelius the Centurion, patron saint archive
