= Custodian of the Standard Book of Common Prayer =

Canonical office in Anglicanism

The Custodian of the Standard Book of Common Prayer is a canonical office in some Anglican churches, including the Anglican Church of Canada and The Episcopal Church, responsible for maintaining official texts of the Book of Common Prayer.

== Custodians in Canada ==
- William James Armitage (February 6, 1860 – 1929)

== Custodians in the United States ==
The office was established in 1892 by the General Convention, when the First Standard Book was also adopted.

1. Benjamin Isaac Haight, 1868–1879
2. Francis Harrison, 1880–1885
3. Samuel Hart, 1886–1917
4. Lucien Moore Robinson, 1917–1933
5. John Wallace Suter, 1934–1942
6. John Wallace Suter, Jr., 1942–1962
7. Charles Mortimer Guilbert, 1963-1998
8. Gregory Michael Howe, 2000-2015
9. Juan M. Cabrero-Oliver, 2015–2022
10. J. Neil Alexander, 2022–present
