= Charles C. Haight =

American architect

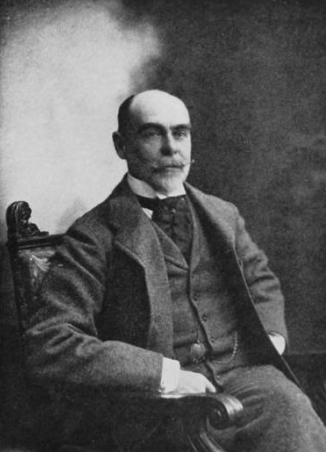
- Born: March 17, 1841; New York City, U.S.
- Died: February 9, 1917 (aged 75); Garrison, New York, U.S.
- Education: Columbia University
- Occupation: Architect
- Spouse: Euphemia Kneeland
- Parent(s): Rev. Benjamin I. Haight and Hetty Coolidge
- Buildings: General Theological Seminary, New York

Charles Coolidge Haight (March 17, 1841 – February 9, 1917) was an American architect who practiced in New York City. He designed most of the buildings at Columbia College's now-demolished old campus on Madison Avenue, and designed numerous buildings at Yale University, many of which have survived (even though Yale's collegiate-gothic architecture is more often associated with the better known James Gamble Rogers). He designed the master plan and many of the buildings on the campus of the General Theological Seminary in Chelsea, New York, most of which have survived. Haight's architectural drawings and photographs are held in the Dept. of Drawings and Archives at the Avery Architectural and Fine Arts Library at Columbia University in New York City.

== Biography ==
Haight was born in New York City on March 17, 1841, the son of the Rev. Benjamin I. Haight and his wife, Hetty Coolidge. He graduated from Columbia College in 1861, and studied law at Columbia until the outbreak of the American Civil War. In 1862, Haight enlisted in the Union Army with the 7th New York Militia, and then fought with the 31st New York Volunteers. In 1864, he was wounded during the Battle of the Wilderness, after which he retired from military service. After the war, Haight apprenticed with the architect Emlen T. Littell (1840–1891) until 1867 when he opened his own office.

In 1865, Haight married Euphemia Kneeland (1842–1909), with whom he had four children. He died at his home in Garrison, New York in 1917.

== Selected works ==
=== Buildings at Yale University ===
- Vanderbilt Hall, Old Campus (completed 1894).
- Phelps Gate, Old Campus (completed 1895).
- Phelps Hall, Old Campus (completed 1896).
- Linsly Hall, now part of Linsly-Chittenden Hall, Old Campus (built 1906).
- Vanderbilt Scientific Halls, dormitories for the Sheffield Scientific School (completed 1906).
- Leet Oliver Memorial Hall (completed 1908).
- Mason Laboratory, Sheffield Scientific School (completed 1911).
- Sloane Physics Laboratory, Sheffield Scientific School (completed 1912).
- St. Anthony Hall, Sigma Chapter (commissioned by chapter member Frederick William Vanderbilt and completed 1913).
- Osborn Memorial Laboratories, 165 Prospect Street (completed 1914).

=== Buildings in New York City ===
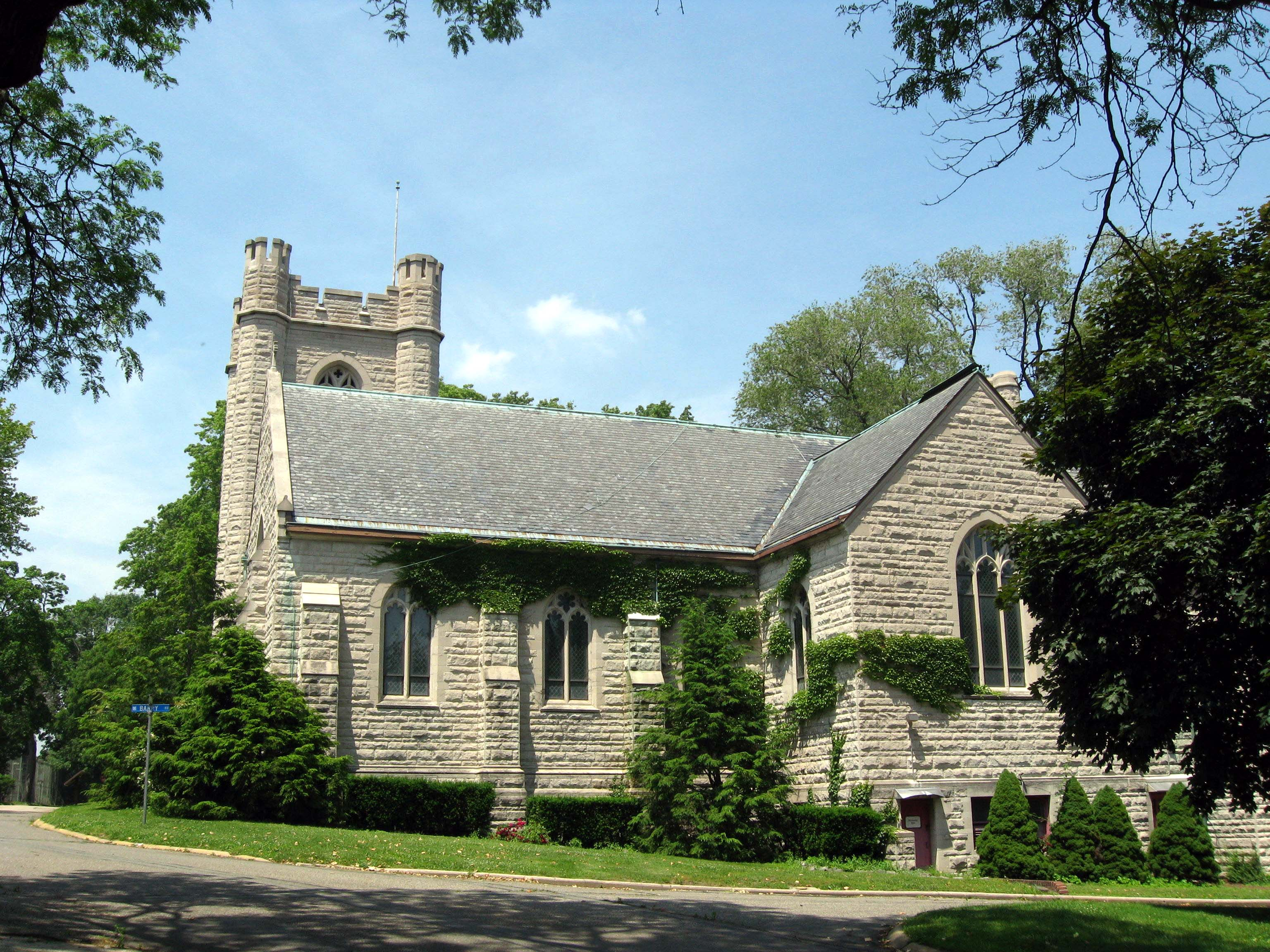
Chapel of St. Cornelius the Centurion (1906), Governors Island

- Sheltering Arms Asylum for Children, West 129th Street, New York City (completed 1870; demolished 1945), now the site of the Sheltering Arms Playground.
- School of Mines, Columbia College (completed 1874; demolished).
- Hamilton Hall, College College (completed 1880; demolished).
- Manhattan Ear and Eye Hospital, East 41st St., New York City (completed 1880).
- Law School, Columbia College (completed 1882; demolished).
- Warehouse, Trinity Corporation, 440 Canal St., New York City (completed 1882).
- General Theological Seminary, New York City, Campus Master Plan (completed 1883).
- Brooks Brothers Building, 932-938 Broadway, New York City (completed 1884; demolished).
- Library, Columbia College (completed 1884; demolished).
- Warehouse, 443 Greenwich St., Tribeca, New York City (completed 1884; converted to condominiums).
- Apartment Bldg. for Robert F. Cutting, East 14th St., New York City (completed 1886).
- Church of the Reformation, 130 Stanton St., New York City (completed 1886).
- New York Cancer Hospital, West 106th St., New York City (completed 1887), modeled after a French Renaissance château at Le Lude, Sarthe.
- Down Town Association, 60 Pine St., New York City (completed 1887).
- Trinity Parish Vestry Office, Church Street, New York City (completed 1887).
- General Theological Seminary, East Quadrangle (various buildings completed by 1887).
- General Theological Seminary, Chapel of the Good Shepherd (completed 1888).
- Warehouse, 149-151 Franklin Street, New York City (completed 1888).
- Higgins Hall, Pratt Institute, Brooklyn, New York (south wing completed February 1889).
- Henry Osborne Havemeyer House, One East 66th Street, New York City (completed 1889; demolished).
- Oliver H. Payne House, 852 Fifth Avenue, New York City (completed 1889; demolished).
- Daniel Willis James House, Park Avenue, New York City (completed 1890).
- Warehouse, 55-57 North Moore Street, New York City (completed 1890).
- American Music Hall (American Theater), West 42nd St., New York City (completed 1893; demolished 1932).
- Trinity School, Lower School Building, 139 West 91st Street, New York City (completed 1894).
- General Theological Seminary, West Quadrangle (various buildings completed by 1900).
- Saint Ignatius of Antioch Episcopal Church, West End Ave., New York City (completed 1902).
- 108 Waverly Place, Greenwich Village, New York (altered 1906).
- Chapel of St. Cornelius the Centurion, Governors Island, New York (completed 1905–1906).
- Warehouse, 330 Hudson St., New York City (completed 1910; addition by others 2014).
- Second Field Artillery Armory, Bronx, New York (completed 1911).

=== Buildings outside New York City ===
- Cathedral Church of St. Luke, Portland, Maine (completed 1868).
- Trinity Episcopal Chapel, Morley, New York (completed 1871).
- St. Paul's Episcopal Church, Spring Valley, New York (completed 1872).
- St. John the Baptist Church, Wakefield, New Hampshire (completed 1877).
- Church of the Good Shepherd, 331 Lake Avenue, Maitland, Florida (completed 1883).
- Chapel of the Holy Cross, Holderness, New Hampshire (completed 1884).
- St. Stephen's College, Annandale-on-Hudson, New York (completed 1884).
- George W. Folsom House, Sunnyridge, Lenox, Massachusetts (completed 1884; destroyed by fire 1925; rebuilt 1926).
- William Bayard Cutting House, Westbrook, now part of the Bayard Cutting Arboretum State Park, Great River, Long Island (completed 1886).
- Bethesda-by-the-Sea, first church building, Palm Beach, Florida (completed 1889; demolished 1895).
- Keney Tower, Hartford, Connecticut (completed 1898).
- St. Luke's Chapel, Sewanee: The University of the South (completed 1904).
- Indiana limestone reredos at Trinity Church on the Green, New Haven, Connecticut.

== Gallery ==
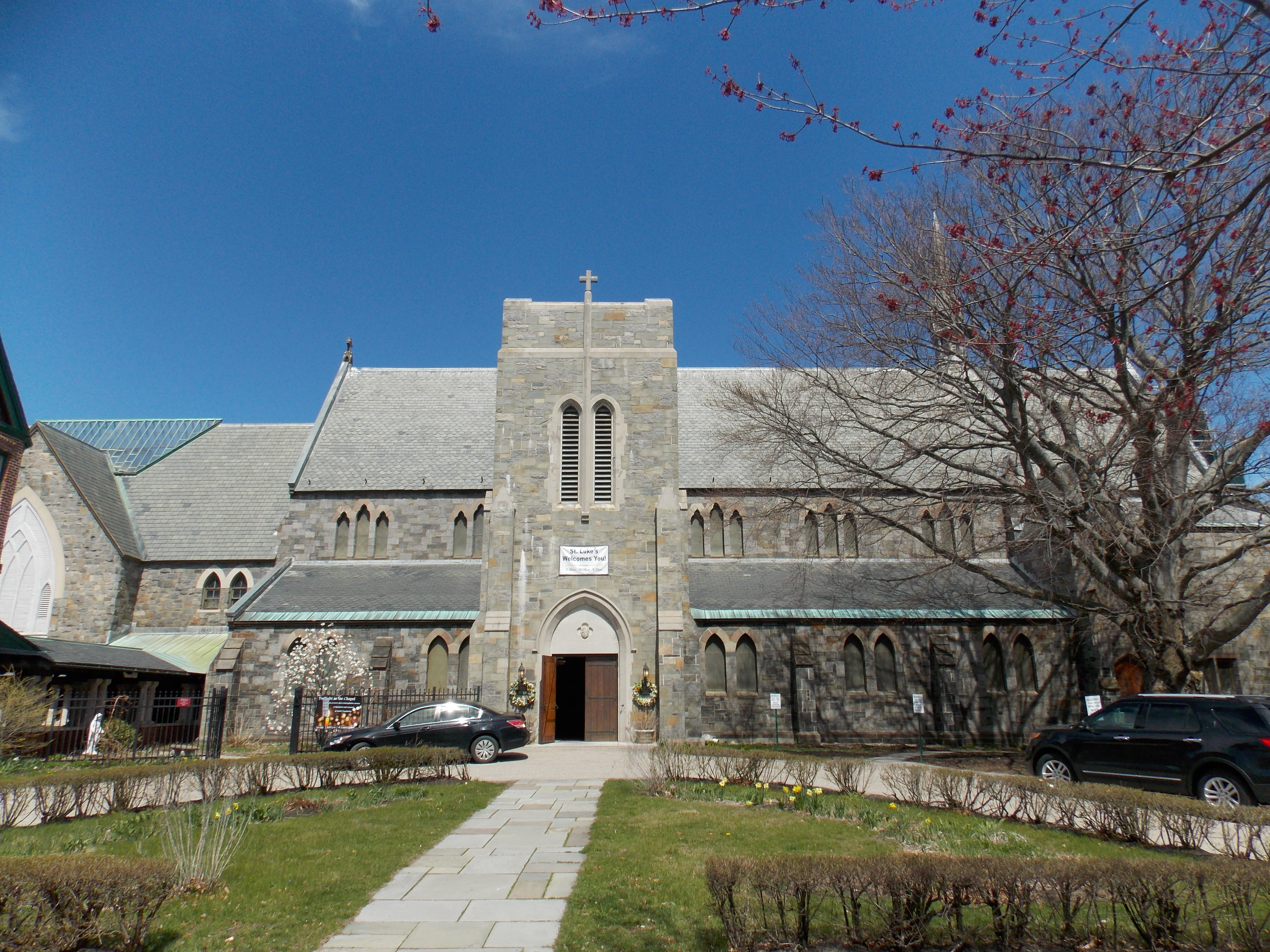
Cathedral Church of St. Luke, Portland, Maine (completed 1868)

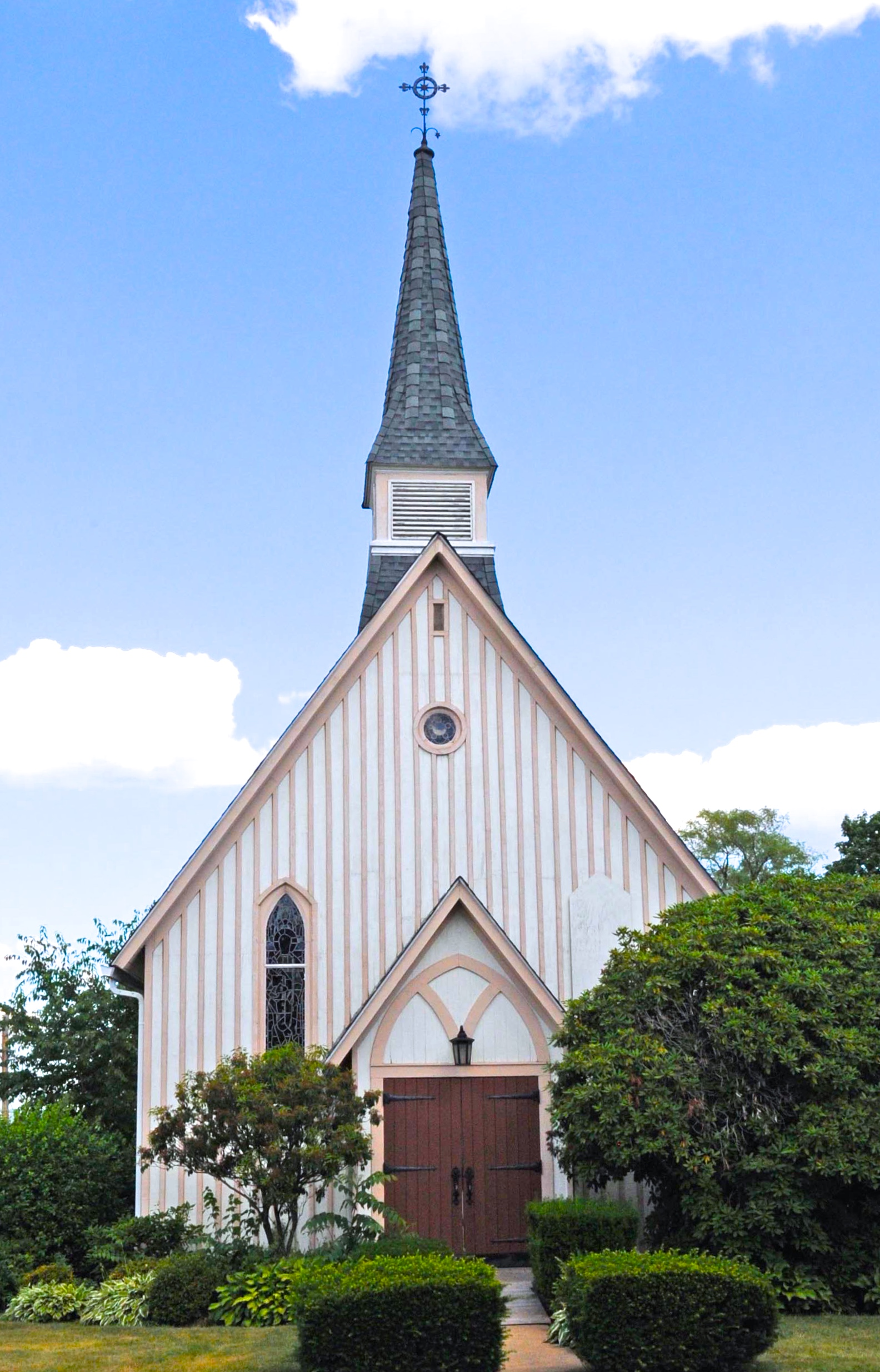
St. Paul's Episcopal Church, Spring Valley, New York (completed 1872)

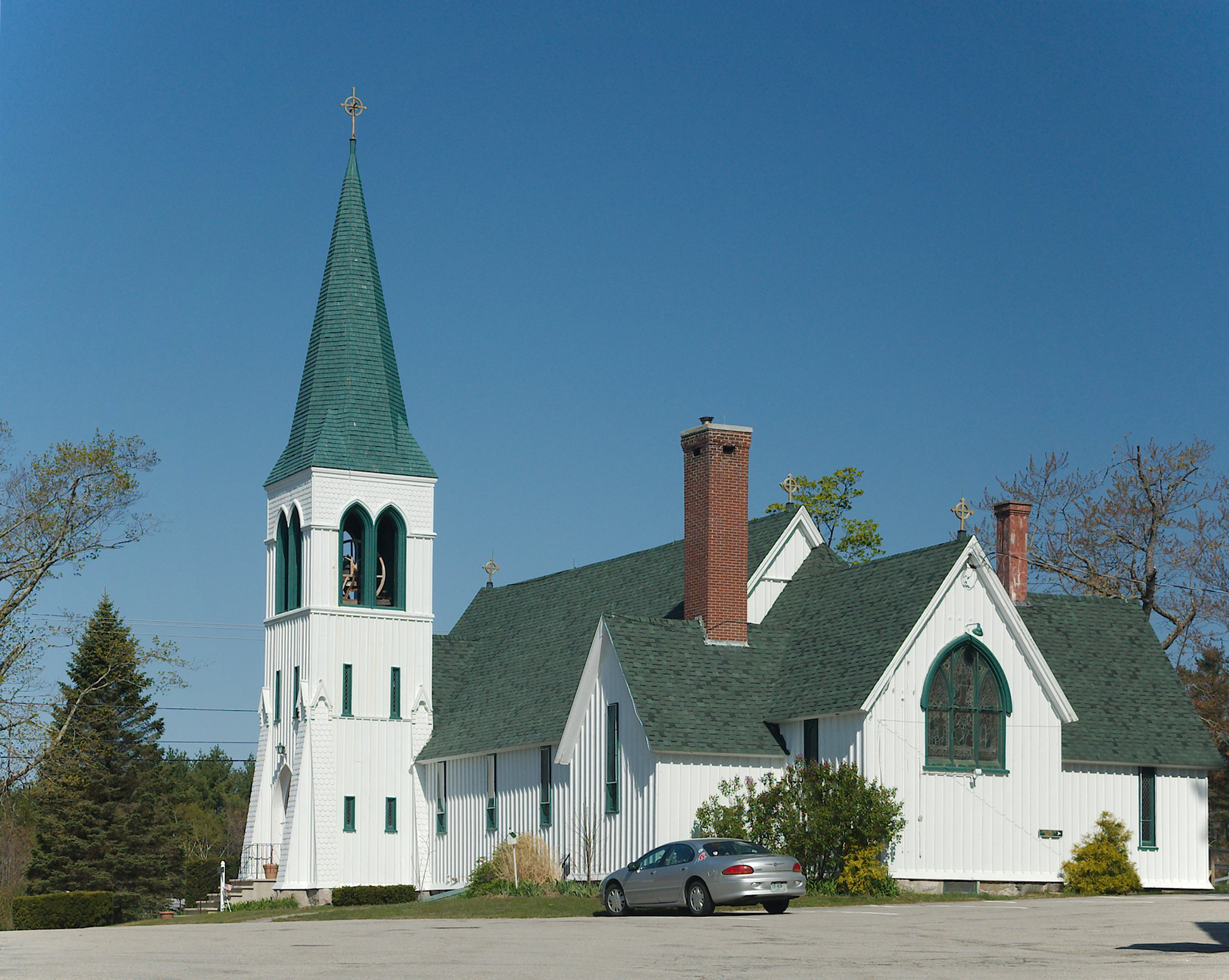
St. John the Baptist Church, Wakefield, New Hampshire (completed 1877)

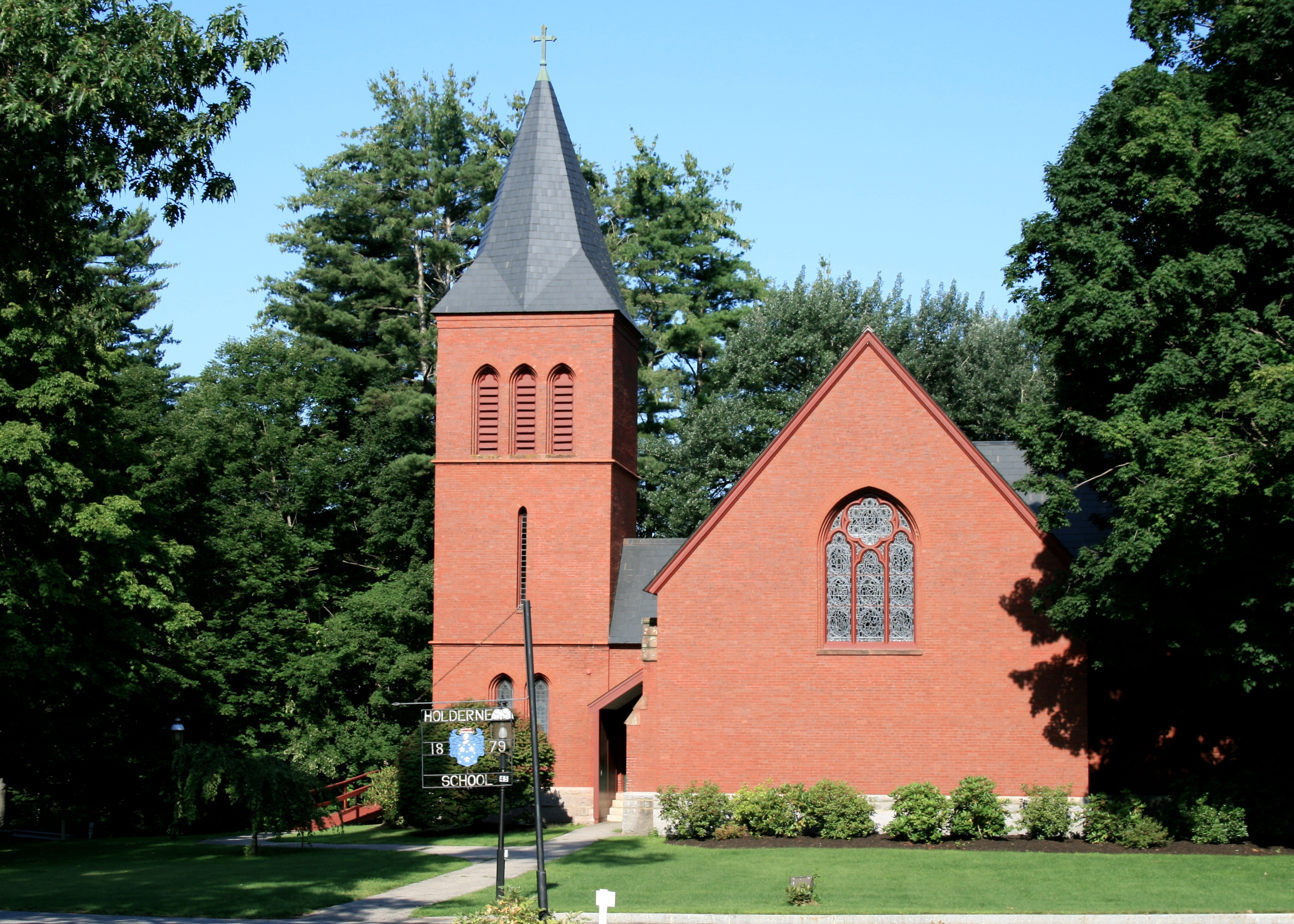
Chapel of the Holy Cross, Holderness, New Hampshire (completed 1884)

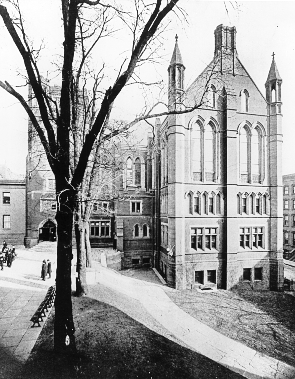
Columbia University Law School, New York City (completed 1884; demolished)

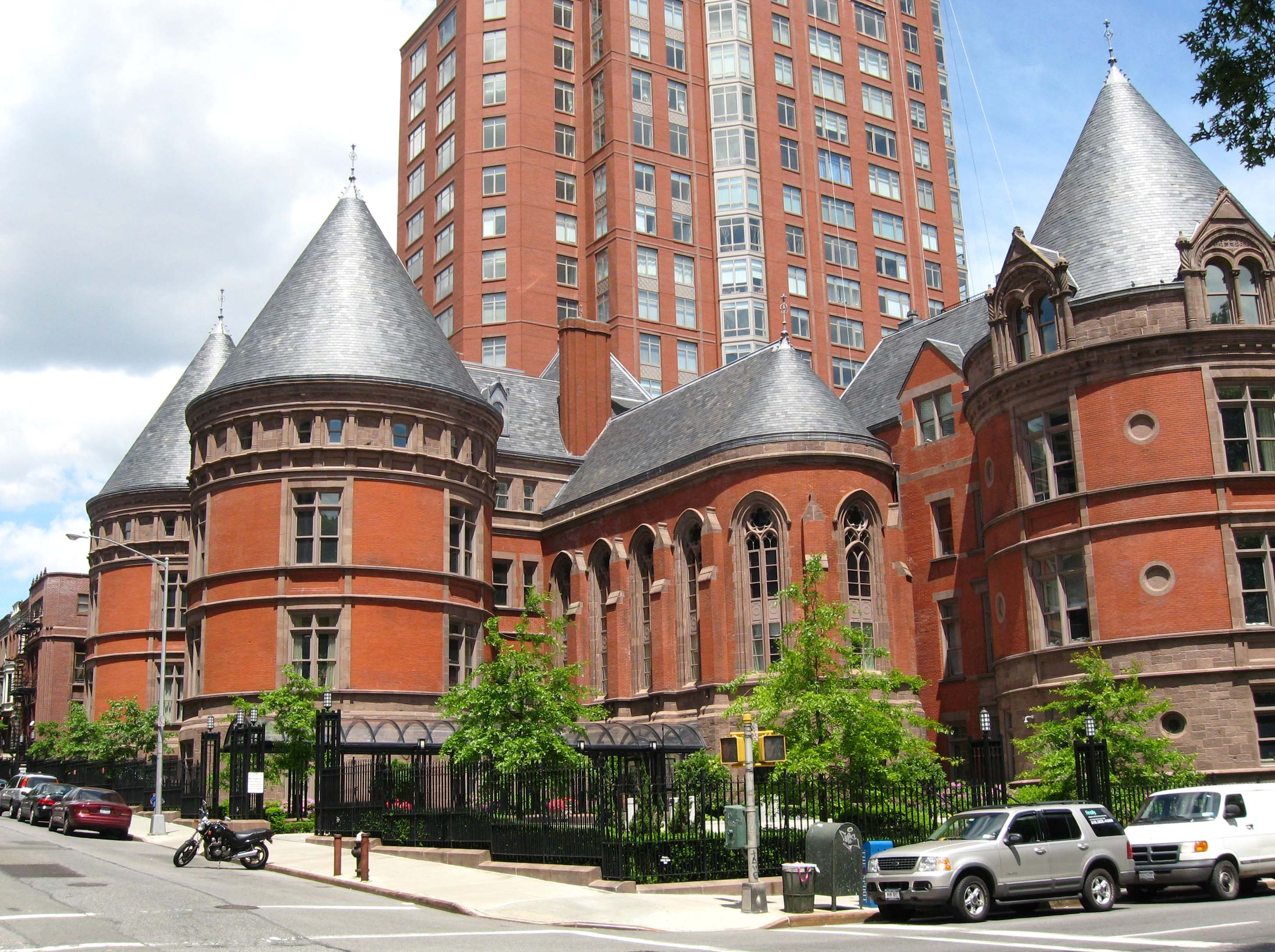
New York Cancer Hospital, 455 Central Park West, New York City (completed 1887)

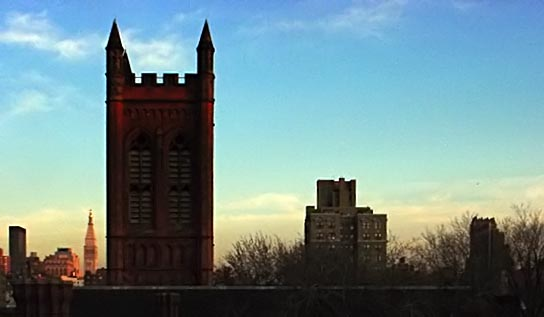
Tower of the Chapel of the Good Shepherd, General Theological Seminary, Chelsea, New York City (completed 1888)

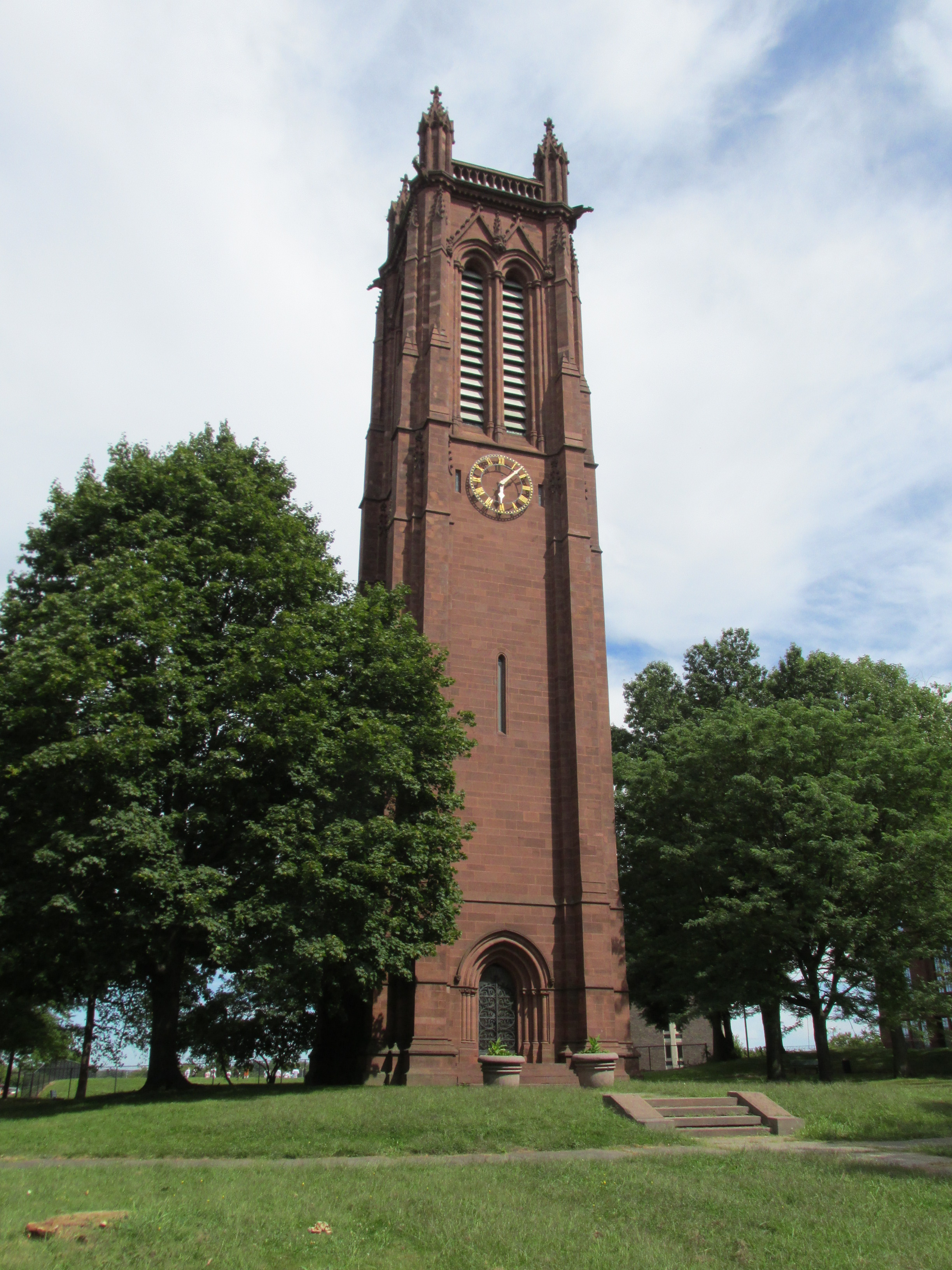
Keney Tower, Hartford, Connecticut (completed 1898)

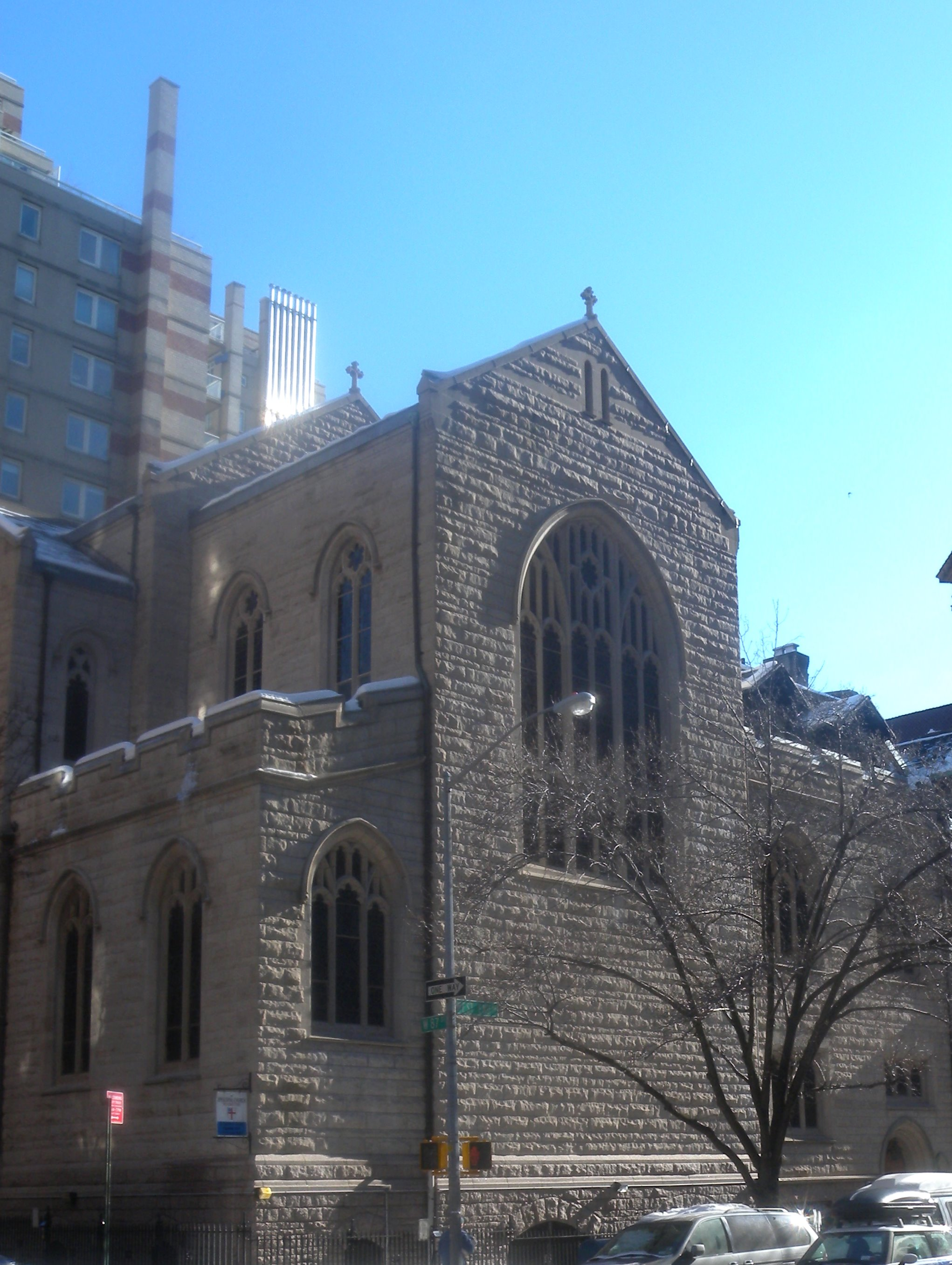
Saint Ignatius of Antioch Episcopal Church, 552 West End Ave., at 87th St., New York City (completed 1902)

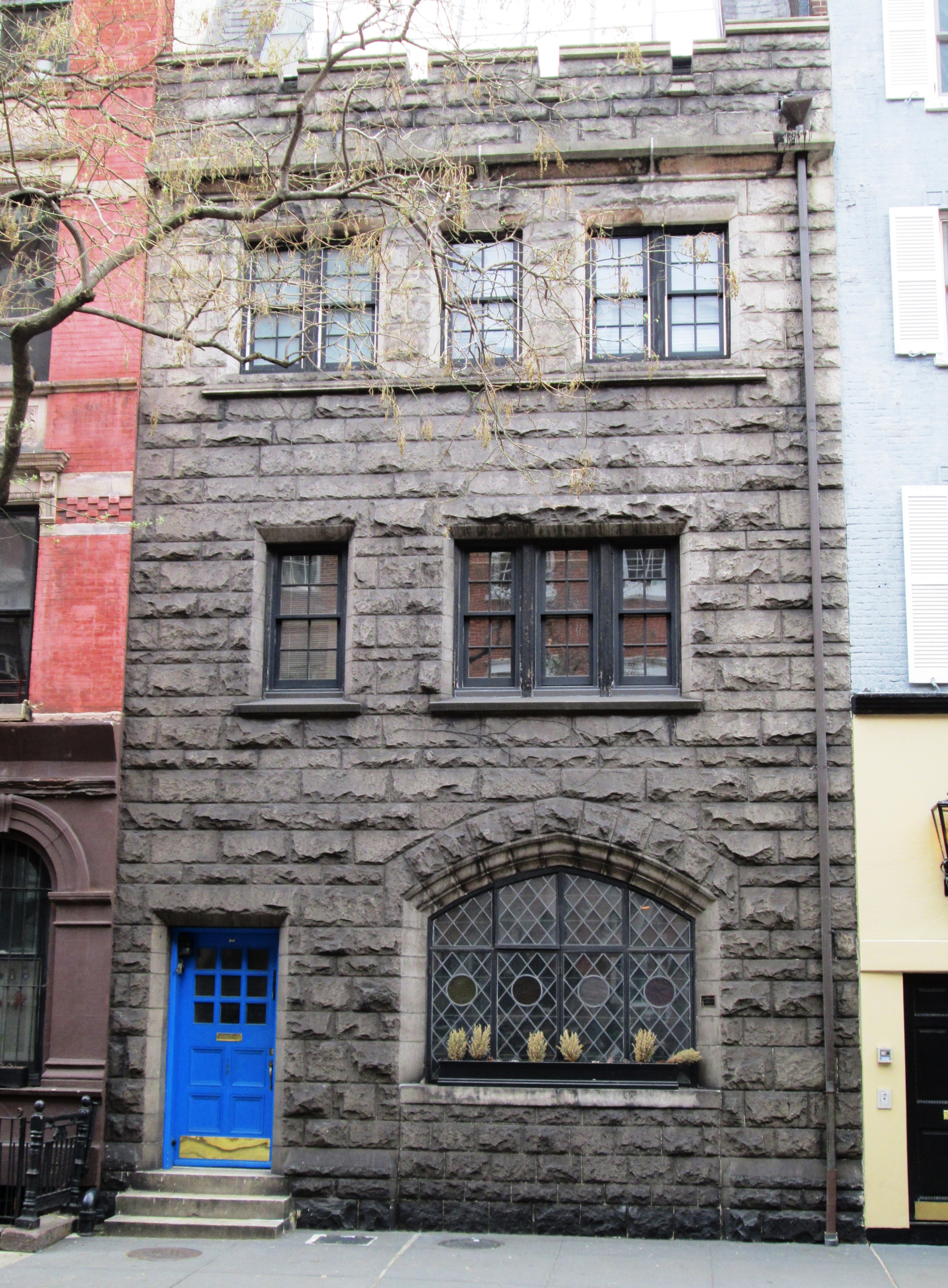
108 Waverly Place (alterations 1906)

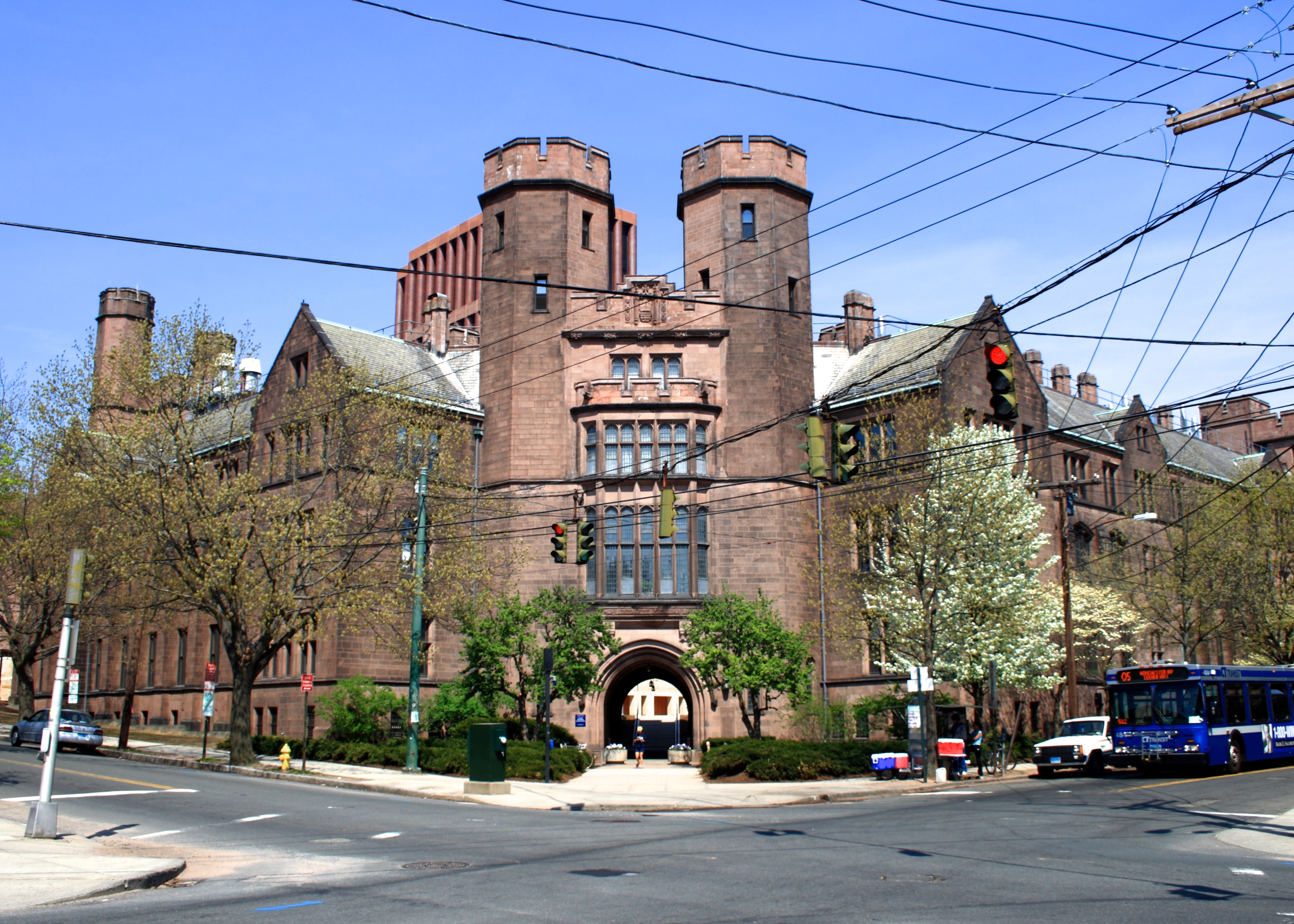
Osborn Memorial Laboratories, 165 Prospect St, New Haven, Connecticut (completed 1914)
