= Forgotten Chicago =

Organization

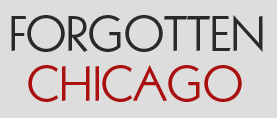
Forgotten Chicago logo in the Kabel typeface

Forgotten Chicago is an organization that seeks to discover and document little-known elements of Chicago's infrastructure, architecture, neighborhoods, and general cityscape, existing or historical.

The organization exposes many of these often-overlooked elements of Chicago's built environment to a wide audience to increase interest in their preservation. In addition to conducting research and publishing articles on its website, Forgotten Chicago also leads neighborhood walking tours and holds free presentations at area libraries. Forgotten Chicago has received many accolades including being named one of Chicago Magazine's 171 best Chicago websites in February 2008 and is featured in the Chicago Tribune, The Times of Northwest Indiana, Time Out Chicago, and local radio.

== History ==
Forgotten Chicago was founded by Jacob Kaplan, Serhii Chrucky, and Corinne Aquino in November 2007.

Their web presence underwent a major re-design in January 2009 with feature improvements, revised and updated content, and more ways for the public to get involved with the organization through Twitter and Facebook.

== See also ==
- Forgotten NY
