= Osborn Memorial Laboratories =

Coordinates: 41.3162°N 72.9235°W

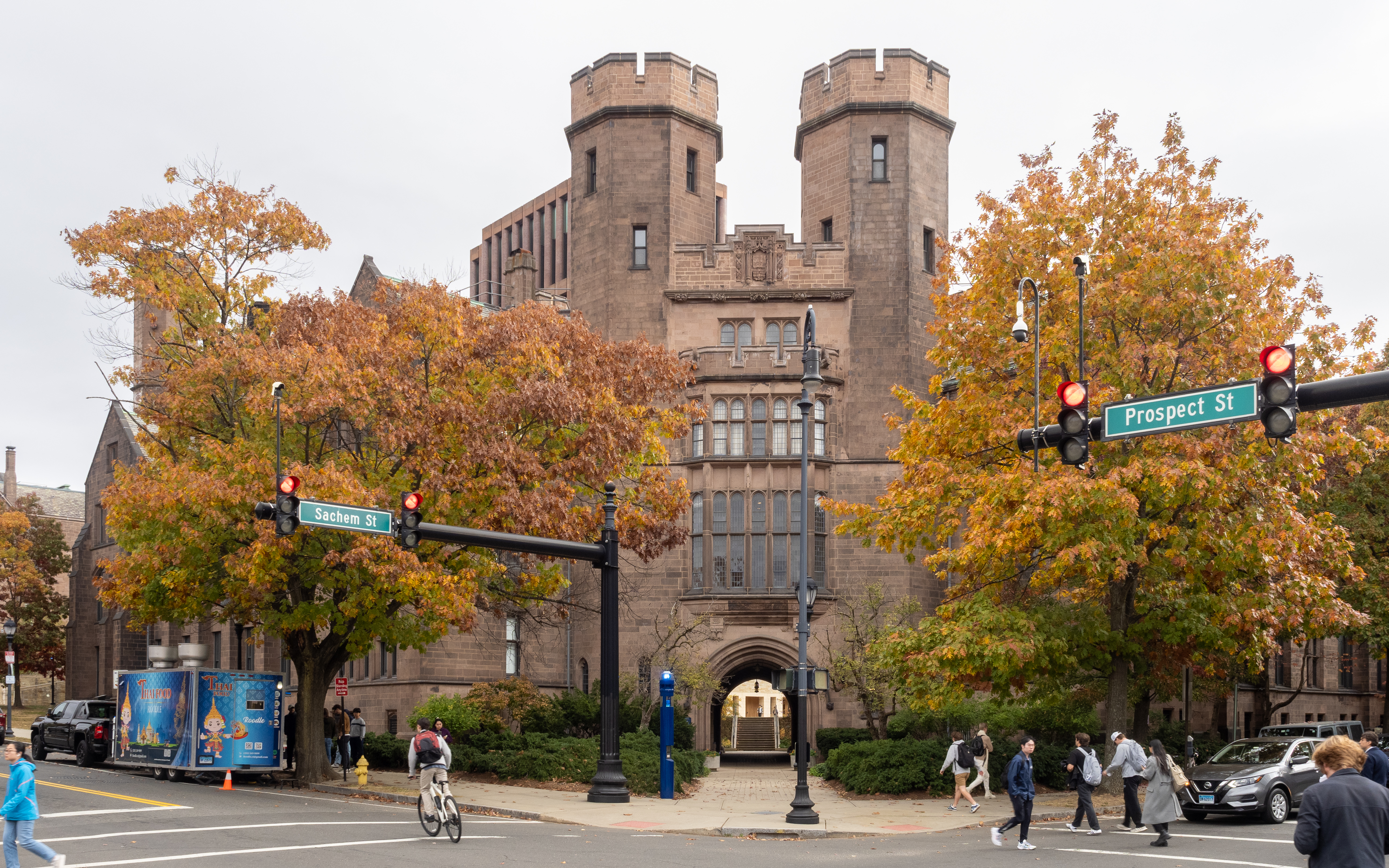
The exterior of Osborn Memorial Labs

The Osborn Memorial Laboratories in New Haven, Connecticut were built in 1913 as the home for biology at Yale University. In the past, they contained both zoology and botany, in the two wings on Sachem Street and Prospect Street (address: 165 Prospect St.). They sit at the base of Sachem's Woods: the original site of Highwood, the mansion of James Abraham Hillhouse. This area is now known as Science Hill and is the site of Kline Biology Tower, Sage Hall (Yale School of Forestry and Environmental Studies), and chemistry and physics buildings. The building sits across Prospect Street from Ingalls Rink and across Sachem from the former location of the Yale School of Management. It was designed by the architect Charles C. Haight, who also designed buildings of the original Columbia University campus on the current site of Rockefeller Center.

Osborn Memorial Laboratories is an entirely masonry structure, down to the sub-basement of unfinished brickwork. Its main arch was once a covered entry for carriages. It contained a library over that same arch, with a faux sky ceiling, now a conference room, and a series of laboratories. The laboratories and offices have been reconfigured many times. Now the first floor and basements are set aside for teaching, the second, third and fourth for research, and the fifth for special facilities on the Sachem Wing, laboratories on the Prospect Wing (where once there was a herbarium). The towers are no longer actively occupied.

Work in these laboratories includes that of Joshua Lederberg, G. Evelyn Hutchinson, and others. The main department in the building is now the Yale Department of Ecology and Evolutionary Biology.
