= 330 Hudson =

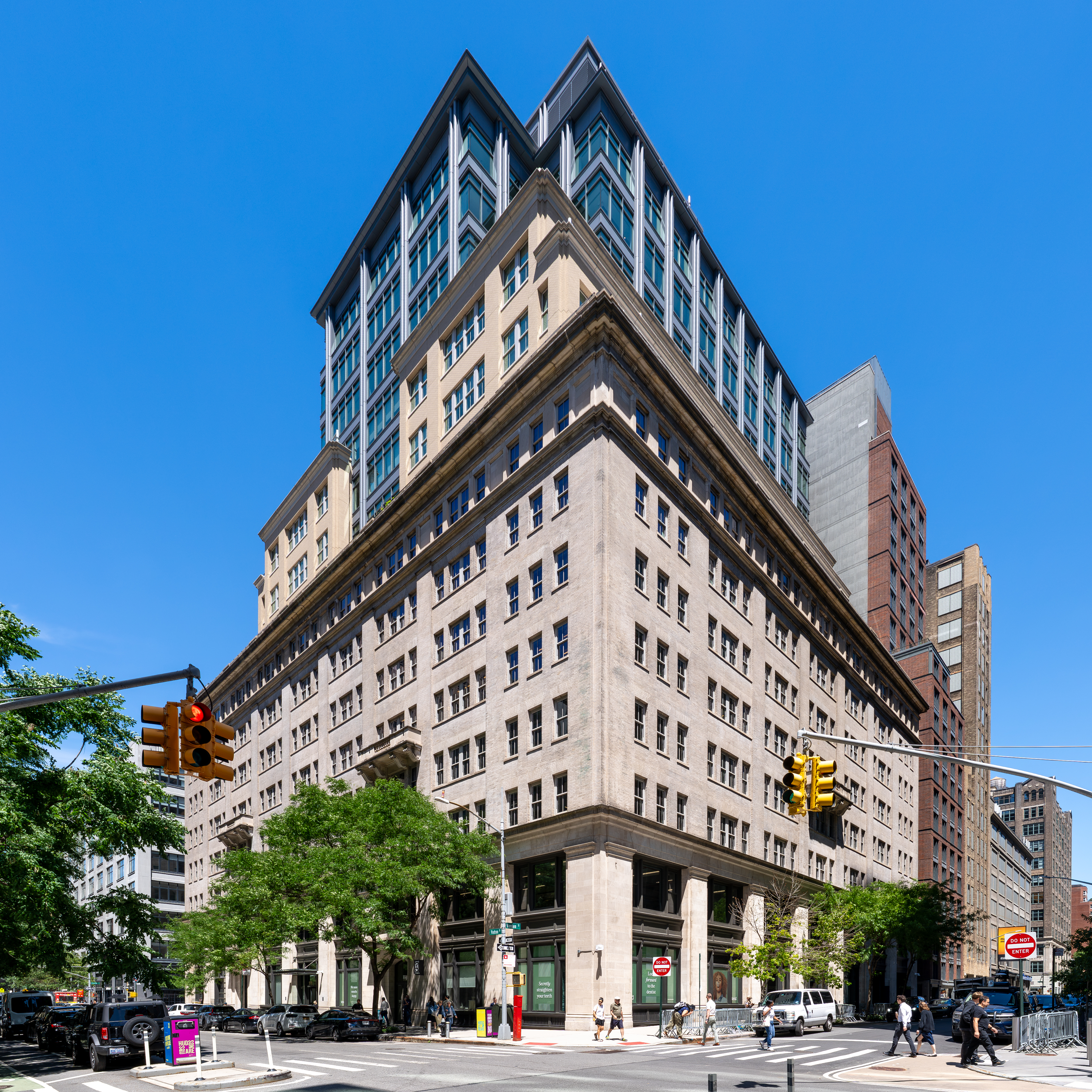
- (2026)
- Interactive map of the 330 Hudson area

General information
- Type: Office
- Location: 330 Hudson Street; Manhattan, New York 10013, U.S.
- Coordinates: 40.7269409°N 74.0070846°W
- Completed: 1910
- Opening: 1910
- Owner: Ivanhoé Cambridge

Technical details
- Floor count: 16
- Floor area: 418,445 square feet (38,874.8 m^{2})

Design and construction
- Architects: Original Architect, Charles Haight 1910; Renovation Architect: Brennan Beer Gorman Architects / HOK

330 Hudson is a building located at 330 Hudson Street, in the Hudson Square neighborhood of Manhattan, New York City. Plans for developing the building began in 2011 when landlord Trinity Real Estate signed a 99-year lease agreement with Beacon Capital Partners. The agreement sought to transform the building into a 350,000-square-foot finished office space, retail space at the base, attracting a variety of commercial tenants. The plans included restoration of the façade of the existing eight-story building and creation of a new eight-story addition.

== History ==
Constructed in 1910, 330 Hudson originally was an eight-story warehouse building and was designed by Charles Haight. One of the original tenants was the Waterman Pen Company, Masback Hardware Company occupied the building from 1935 until 1979, when the Company moved to North Bergen, New Jersey. Masback went out of business in 1996 and the transformation of the Hudson Square neighborhood from a manufacturing to a mixed use neighborhood led to the adaptive re-use of 330 Hudson.

== Building description ==
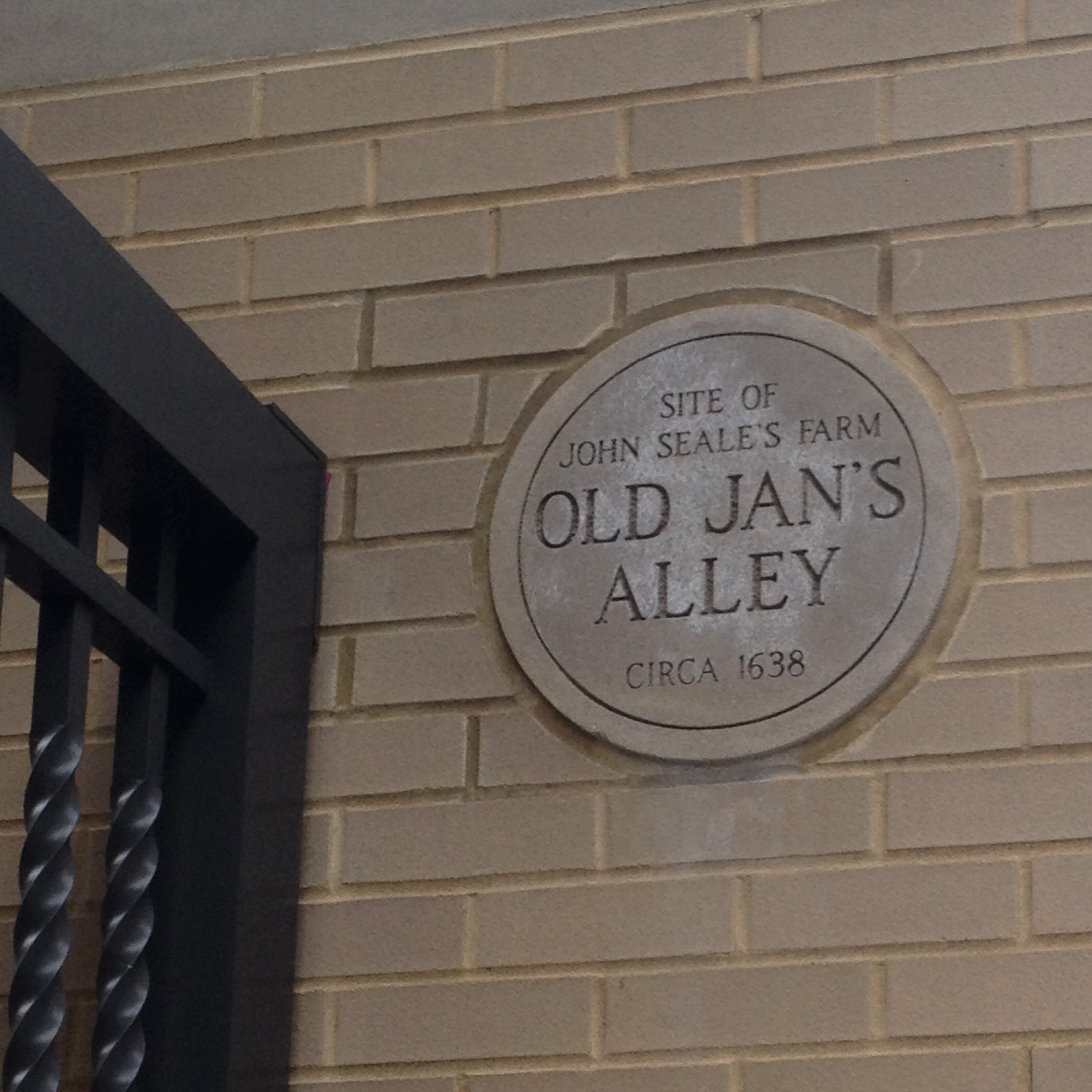
Plaque at 330 Hudson

330 Hudson Street consists of a limestone colonnaded base that supports a brick façade of punched openings. Portions of the original storefront system have been restored, and others replicated, including decorative column capitals. The addition includes a transitional "punched" brick envelope, out of which grows a light curtain-wall clad volume that recalls the cast iron vocabulary of the adjacent SoHo neighborhood.

The industrial nature of the original building is translated into the renovated interiors as well as in the new interiors of the addition. The lobby continues to tell the story of the building and interacts with the public. Designed as a gallery space, the lobby is anchored by visual information that streams through integrated LED wall panel installation designed by Edwin Schlossberg of ESI Design. The panels carry a variety of digital imagery and graphics that serve as a constant source of news and information.

A full-block alley runs at the rear of the building. A plaque denoting "Old Jan's Alley" is located on the alley wall designating the location of John Seales Farm of 1638, one of the original plantations of the New Amsterdam colony. Gregory Cranford, lead designer of the building’s renovation effort, is a 14th generation descendant of John Seales.

== Present tenants ==
- Concentric Health Experience
- Cadillac
- Deloitte Digital
- La Columbe Coffee Roasters
- Mergermarket Group
- Pearson Education
- The Financial Times
- TED
