= Cohors II Italica Civium Romanorum =

- Active: ?
- Country: Ancient Rome
- Type: Cohort
- Role: Infantry
- Garrison/HQ: Syria, ca. 69-157

The Cohors II Italica Civium Romanorum was a Roman military cohort from Italia formed from Roman citizens.

== History ==
A cohort based in Caesarea is referred to in the Acts of the Apostles (Ancient Greek: σπείρης τῆς καλουμένης Ἰταλικῆς, "of the cohort called Italian", in Acts 10:1, translated as the Italian band in the King James Version, or the Italian Regiment in the Good News Translation and World English Bible), and is associated with Cornelius the Centurion, the first gentile convert to Christianity.

According to Josephus, the principal portion of the Roman army stationed at Caesarea were Syrians, and the Pulpit Commentary therefore considers it 'pretty certain ... that the Italian cohort here spoken of were auxiliaries, so called as being made up in whole or in part of Italians, probably volunteers or velones.'

The cohort was among those stationed in Syria in 157 under legate Lucius Attidius Cornelianus.
