= Gia Kourlas =

American dance critic

Gia Kourlas is an American dance critic. Since 2019, she had written as the dance critic for The New York Times.

== Early life and education ==
Kourlas was raised in Columbus, Ohio. She began dancing at age 5; a few years later, she switched to figure skating. She pursued a bachelor's degree in journalism at Ohio State University, where she also worked at student newspaper The Lantern. While at college, she also began taking dance classes again.

== Career ==
After moving to New York City in 1989, Kourlas worked for New York Magazine and the Museum of Television and Radio, was an assistant to George Plimpton, and became an editor at The Paris Review. She also took classes at the Martha Graham School.

Kourlas first began writing about dance when she became the dance critic for Time Out New York in 1995. She continued writing for the publication until they eliminated the position in 2015. In 2016, Kourlas began producing a weekly dance series for The New York Times' Instagram, called #SpeakingInDance. In August 2019, Kourlas was made a full-time dance critic for The New York Times; she had written pieces on dance for the publication since 2000. She has also written for Dance Magazine.

Kourlas has said she wants her writing to make dance more accessible to the public, and as such she has written about dance in popular culture. Kourlas was also one of the earlier critics to note the lack of diversity in major American dance companies. In 2016, she was a resident fellow of NYU's Center for Ballet and the Arts, during which she focused on studying diversity and the presence of Black dancers in the world of classical ballet. Kourlas has also written about the #MeToo movement and feminism in the dance world.
