= Benjamin I. Haight =

Benjamin Isaac Haight (October 16, 1809 — February 21, 1879) was a prominent Episcopal priest, author, and seminary professor of the nineteenth century, as well the first appointed Custodian of the Standard Book of Common Prayer in the United States. Haight served as professor of pastoral theology at the General Theological Seminary (GTS) in New York from 1837 to 1855.

Born in New York City, Haight was graduated from Columbia College in 1828, and from GTS in 1831. He was ordained to the diaconate in 1831 and to the priesthood in 1834, having been called as rector of St. Peter's Church, New York while he was a deacon. He was secretary of the convention of the Episcopal Diocese of New York for twenty years, and was elected as a trustee of Columbia College in 1843. He was Assistant Rector of Trinity Church, Wall Street.

Haight was a deputy to the General Convention of the Protestant Episcopal Church in 1868, 1871, and 1874; he declined election as bishop of the Episcopal Diocese of Massachusetts in 1873. He was appointed Custodian of the Book of Common Prayer in 1868 and held that office until his death in New York in 1879. Haight was also active in the work of the Protestant Episcopal Freedman's Commission and the Protestant Episcopal Church Mission to Deaf-Mutes. He is buried at St. James churchyard in Hyde Park, New York.

His son Charles C. Haight was a prominent New York architect who designed much of the old campus of Columbia University, several buildings at Yale University, many buildings at the General Seminary in Chelsea, and churches throughout the United States.

== Bibliography ==
- The Religious Education of the Young (1838)
- The Holy Child Jesus, an Example of Obedience to Parents: A Sermon to Children (1839)
- An Address Delivered before the Philolexian Society of Columbia College (1840)
- The Two Aspects of Death: A Sermon, Preached in All Saints' Church, New-York, on the Second Sunday after Trinity (1840)
- The Guide to the Understanding of the Holy Scriptures and the Unity of the Church: Two Sermons Preached in All Saints' Church, New York (1841)
- The Young Prophet (1841)
- A Letter to a Parishioner, Relative to the Recent Ordination of Mr. Arthur Carey (1843)
- Report of the Committee Appointed to Consider the Sentence upon the Right Reverend Benjamin T. Onderdonk, and the Effect Thereof upon the Powers and Duties of the Standing-committee of the Diocese of New-York (1843)
- (editor) Ecclesiastes Anglicanus, Being a Treatise on Preaching, as Adapted to a Church of England Congregation in a Series of Letters to a Young Clergyman (1844)
- The Address to the Students of the General Theological Seminary of the Protestant Episcopal Church in the United States at the Annual Matriculation on Ember Monday in Advent (1848)
- To the Friends of the Negro Race (1868)
- Correspondence Touching the Action of the American Church Union in the Case of the Rev. Colin C. Tate, of Ohio (1869)
- In Memoriam Charles Gillette, D.D., Late Secretary and General Agent of Home Missions to Colored People, Died, Instantly, March 6, 1869, at a Meeting of the Clergy of the Protestant Episcopal Church of New York and Brooklyn, Held in the Chapel of the Church of the Holy Trinity, Brooklyn, Tuesday, March 9, 1869 (1869)
- A Memorial Discourse of Nathaniel F. Moore, LL.D., Sometime President of Columbia College, New York, Delivered at the Request of the Alumni, January 14, 1874, in the College Chapel (1874)
