= Forgotten New York =

Forgotten New York is a website created by Kevin Walsh (born c. 1958) in 1999, chronicling the unnoticed and unchronicled aspects of New York City such as painted building ads, decades-old cast iron lampposts, 18th-century houses, abandoned subway stations, trolley track remnants, out-of-the-way neighborhoods, and flashes of nature hidden in the midst of the big city. In 2003, HarperCollins approached Walsh with the idea of turning the website into a book; Forgotten New York was published in September 2006.

Walsh released Forgotten Queens, a collaboration with the Greater Astoria Historical Society, in December 2013 on Arcadia Books, and is currently composing a book proposal for a second Forgotten New York book. He has hosted more than 150 live tours and is working on mounting ongoing online tours.

Walsh has contributed to the book New York Calling, edited by Brian Berger (2007), and has written articles for The New York Times, New York Daily News, and other publications. He has appeared on The Brian Lehrer Show, The Frank Morano Program, and online radio hosted by Mike Edison.

On March 2, 2015, the Guides Association of New York City awarded Forgotten New York its first Outstanding New York Website award.

== See also ==
- Forgotten Chicago
