= Vayetze =

7th weekly Torah portion in the annual Jewish cycle of Torah reading

Vayetze, Vayeitzei, or Vayetzei (וַיֵּצֵא—Hebrew for "and he left," the first word in the parashah) is the seventh weekly Torah portion (פָּרָשָׁה, parashah) in the annual Jewish cycle of Torah reading. It constitutes Genesis 28:10–32:3. The parashah tells of Jacob's travels to, life in, and return from Harran. The parashah recounts Jacob's dream of a ladder to heaven, Jacob's meeting of Rachel at the well, Jacob's time working for Laban and living with Rachel and Leah, the birth of Jacob's children, and the departure of Jacob's family from Laban.

The parashah is made up of 7,512 Hebrew letters, 2,021 Hebrew words, 148 verses, and 235 lines in a Torah Scroll (סֵפֶר תּוֹרָה, Sefer Torah). Jews read it the seventh Sabbath after Simchat Torah, generally in November or December.

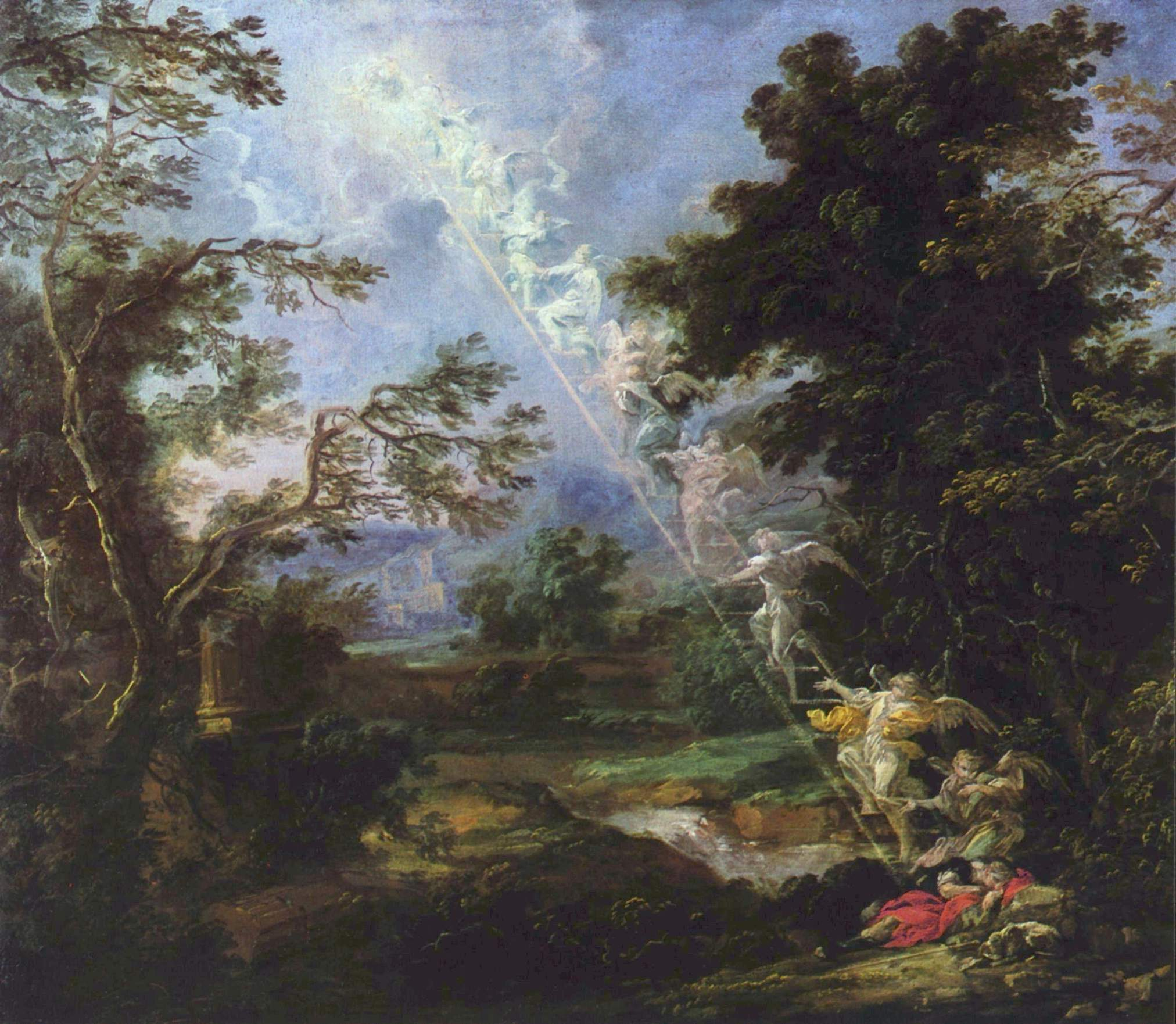
Landscape with the Dream of Jacob, by Michael Willmann, c. 1691

== Readings ==
In traditional Sabbath Torah reading, the parashah is divided into seven readings, or עליות, aliyot. In the Masoretic Text of the Tanakh (Hebrew Bible), Parashah Vayetze is unusual in that it is entirely contained in one single "open portion" (פתוחה, petuchah) (roughly equivalent to a paragraph, often abbreviated with the Hebrew letter פ (peh)). And within that single open portion, Parashah Vayetze does not have any "closed portion" (סתומה, setumah) divisions (abbreviated with the Hebrew letter ס (samekh)).

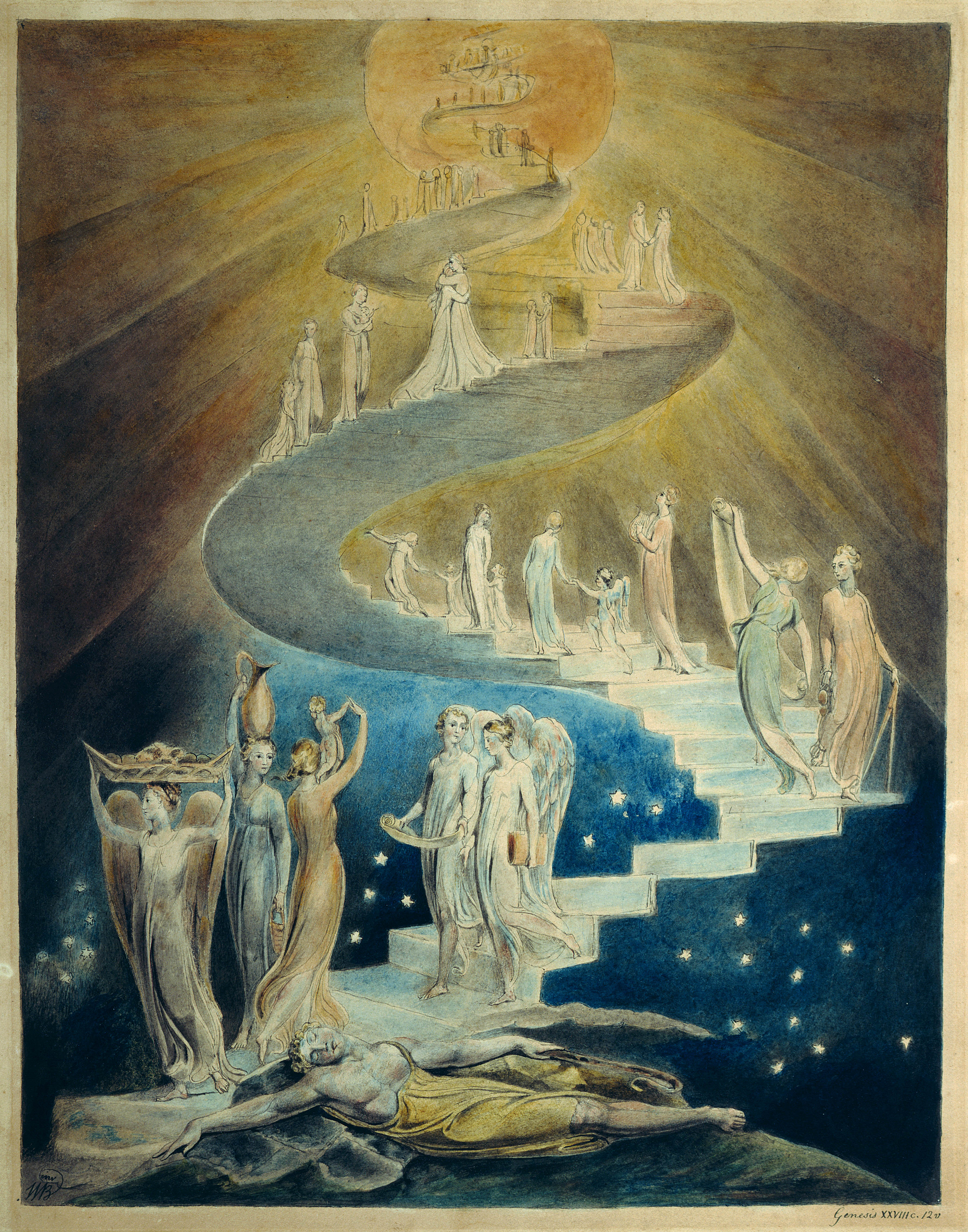
Jacob's Ladder (painting circa 1800 by William Blake)

=== First reading—Genesis 28:10–22 ===
In the first reading, when Jacob left Beersheba for Haran, he stopped at a place for the night, using a stone for a pillow. He dreamed that he saw a ladder to heaven on which God's angels ascended and descended. And God stood beside him and promised to give him and his numerous descendants the land on which he lay, said that through his descendants all the earth would be blessed, and promised to stay with him wherever he went and bring him back to the land. Jacob awoke afraid, remarked that surely the place was the house of God, the gate of heaven, and called the place Bethel (although the Canaanites had called the city Luz). Jacob took the stone from under his head, set it up as a pillar, and poured oil on it. And Jacob vowed that if God would stay with him, give him bread and clothing, and return him to his father's house in peace, then God would be his god, the stone pillar would be God's house, and he would give God a tenth of what he received. The first reading ends here with the end of chapter 28.

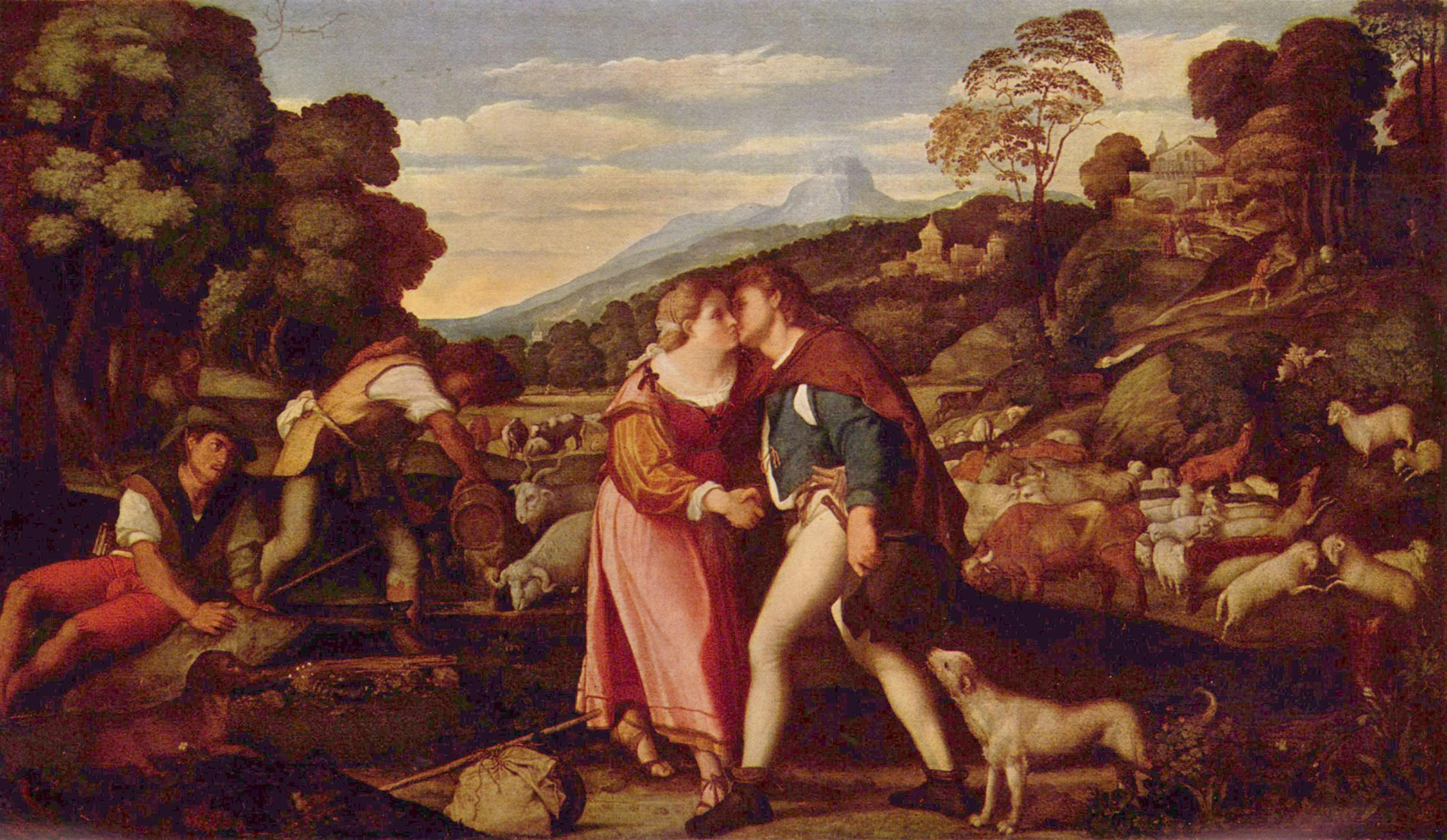
Jacob and Rachel (painting circa 1520–1525 by Palma il Vecchio)

=== Second reading—Genesis 29:1–17 ===
In the second reading, chapter 29, Jacob came to an eastern land where he saw a well with a great stone rolled upon it and three flocks of sheep lying by it. Jacob asked the men where they were from, and they said Haran. Jacob asked them if they knew Laban, and they said that they did. Jacob asked if Laban was well, and they said that he was, and that his daughter Rachel was coming with his sheep. Jacob told the men to water and feed the sheep, but they replied that they could not do so until all the flocks had arrived. When Jacob saw Rachel arrive with her father's sheep, he rolled the stone from the well's mouth, and watered Laban's sheep. Jacob kissed Rachel, wept, and told her that he was her kinsman, and she ran and told her father. When Laban heard of Jacob's arrival, he ran to meet him, embraced and kissed him, and brought him to his house. Jacob told Laban all that had happened, and Laban welcomed Jacob as family. After Jacob had lived with Laban for a month, Laban asked Jacob what wages he wanted for his work. Laban had two daughters: The elder, Leah, had weak eyes, while the younger, Rachel, was beautiful. The second reading ends here.

Terah
Hagar	Abraham	Sarah	Haran
Nahor	Milcah	Iscah	Lot
Bethuel	Moab	Ben-ammi
Ishmael	Isaac	Rebekah	Laban
Esau	Jacob	Leah	Rachel

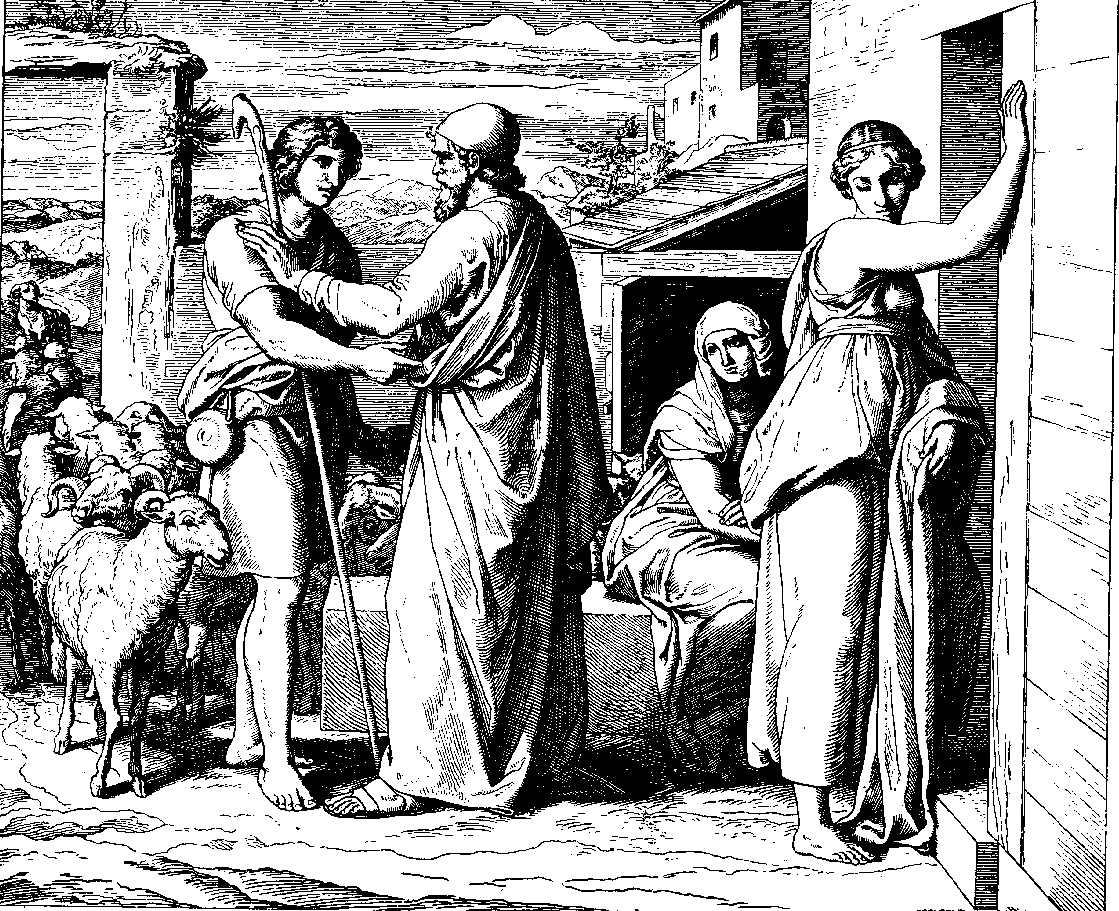
Jacob Tells Laban that He Will Work for Rachel (woodcut by Julius Schnorr von Carolsfeld from the 1860 Die Bibel in Bildern)

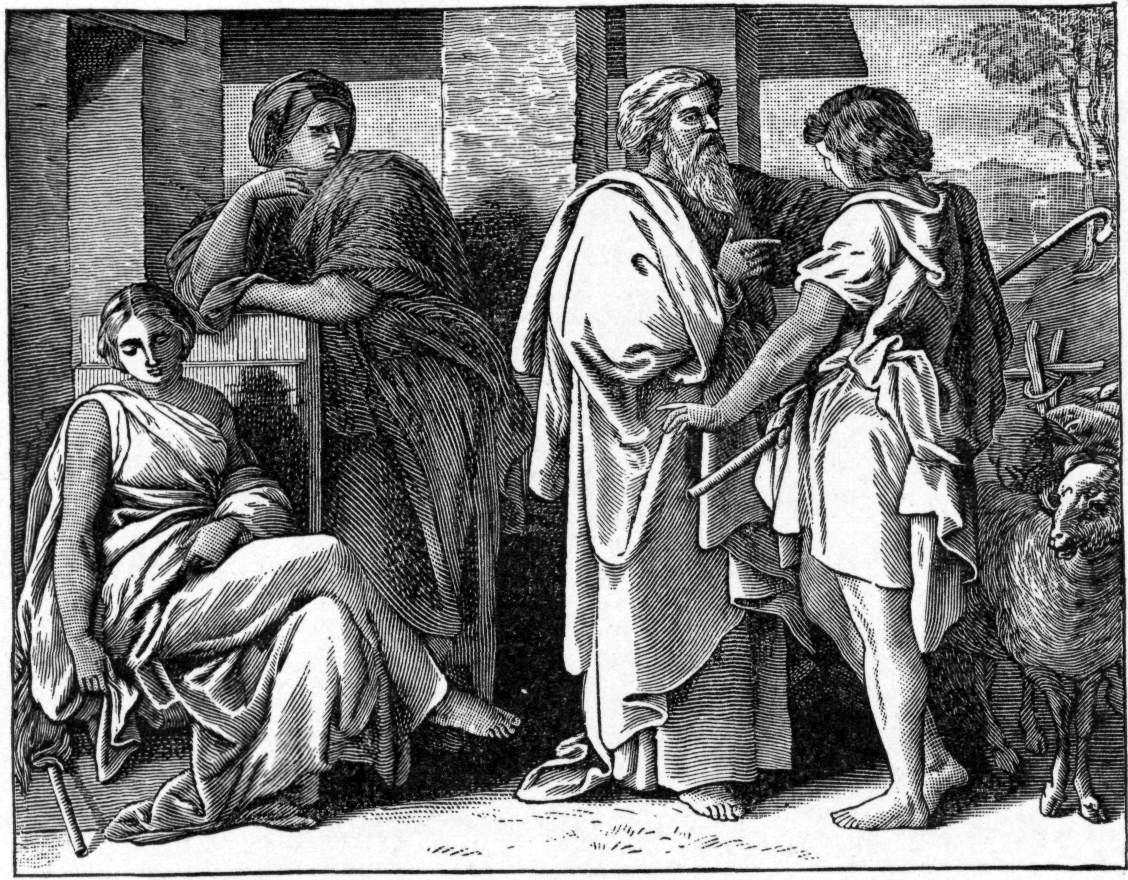
Jacob Talks with Laban (illustration from the 1897 Bible Pictures and What They Teach Us by Charles Foster)

=== Third reading—Genesis 29:18–30:13 ===
In the third reading, Jacob loved Rachel and, responding to Laban's enquiry in verse 15, offered to serve Laban seven years for Rachel's hand, to which Laban agreed. Jacob served the years, but his love for Rachel made them seem like just a few days. Jacob asked Laban for his wife, and Laban made a feast and invited all the men of the place. In the evening, Laban brought Leah to Jacob, and Jacob slept with her. Laban gave Leah Zilpah to be her handmaid. In the morning, Jacob discovered that it was Leah, and he complained to Laban that he had served for Rachel. Laban replied that in that place, they did not give the younger before the firstborn, but if Jacob fulfilled Leah's week, he would give Jacob both daughters in exchange for another seven years of service. Jacob did so, and Laban gave him Rachel to wife, and gave Rachel Bilhah to be her handmaid. Jacob loved Rachel more than Leah, so God allowed Leah to conceive, but Rachel was barren. Leah bore a son, and called him Reuben, saying that God had looked upon her affliction. She bore a second son, and called him Simeon, saying that God had heard that she was hated. She bore a third son, and called him Levi, saying that this time her husband would be joined to her. She bore a fourth son, and called him Judah, saying that this time, she would praise God. Rachel envied her sister, and demanded that Jacob give her children, but Jacob grew angry and asked her whether he was in God's stead, who had withheld children from her. Rachel told Jacob to sleep with her maid Bilhah, so that Bilhah might bear children upon Rachel's knees who might be credited to Rachel, and he did. Bilhah bore Jacob a son, and Rachel called him Dan, saying that God had judged her and also heard her voice. And Bilhah bore Jacob a second son, and Rachel called him Naphtali, saying that she had wrestled with her sister and prevailed. When Leah saw that she had stopped bearing, she gave Jacob her maid Zilpah to wife. Zilpah bore Jacob a son, and Leah called him Gad, saying that fortune had come. And Zilpah bore Jacob a second son, and Leah called him Asher, saying that she was happy, for the daughters would call her happy. The third reading ends here.

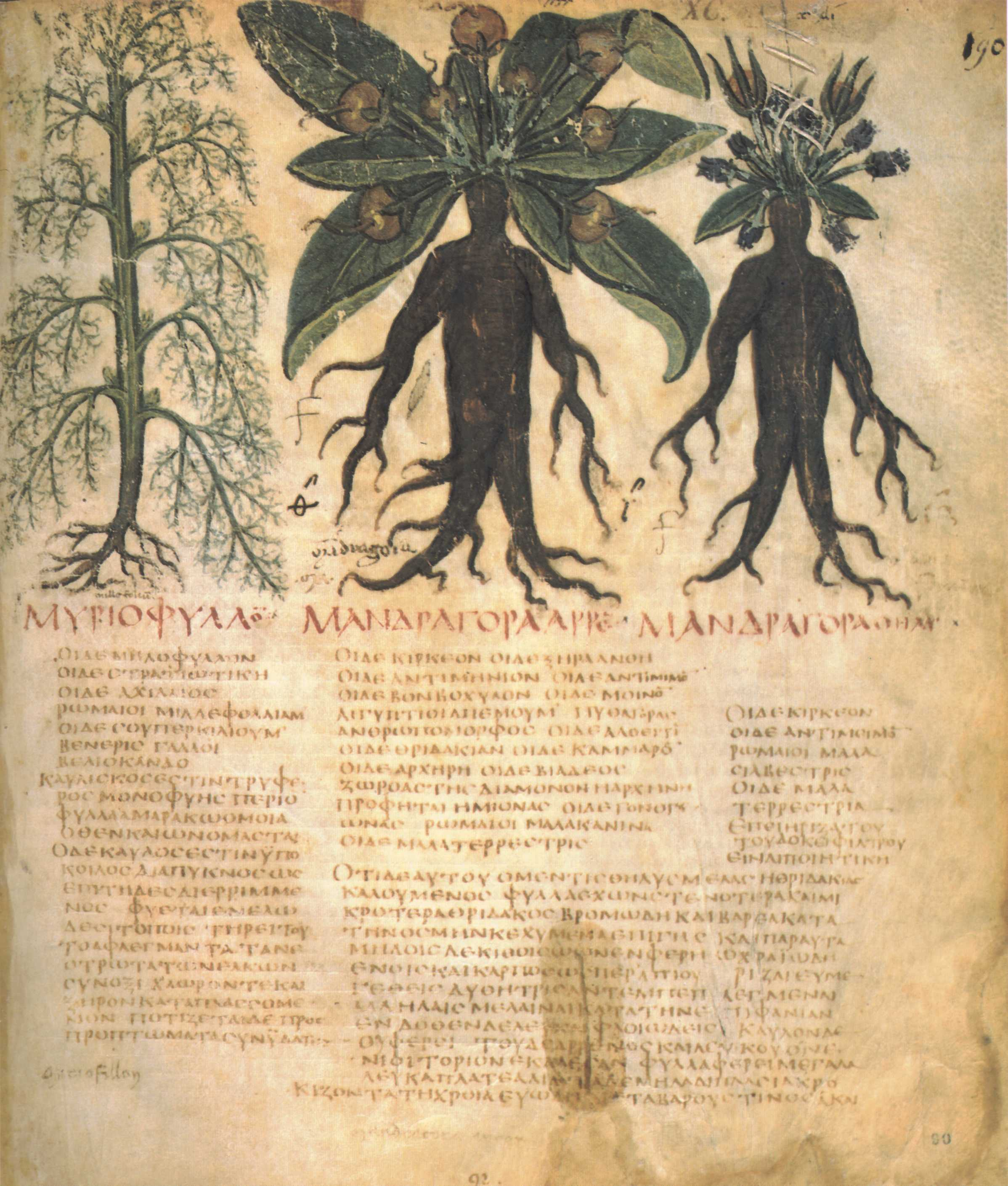
Mandrake roots (illustration from a 7th-century manuscript of Pedanius Dioscorides De Materia Medica)

=== Fourth reading—Genesis 30:14–27 ===
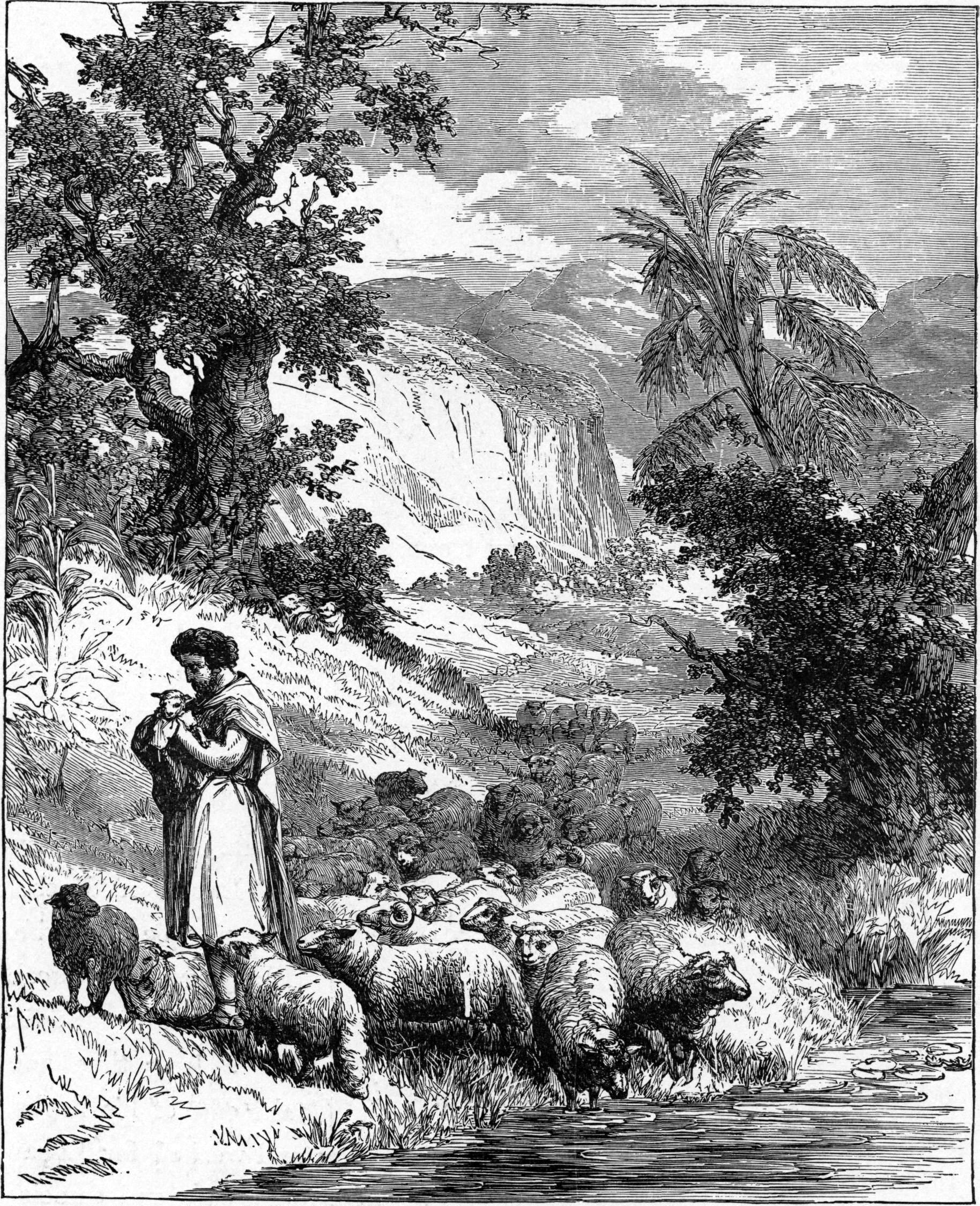
A Shepherd (illustration from the 1897 Bible Pictures and What They Teach Us by Charles Foster)

In the fourth reading, Reuben found some mandrakes and brought them to Leah. Rachel asked Leah for the mandrakes, and when Leah resisted, Rachel agreed that Jacob would sleep with Leah that night in exchange for the mandrakes. When Jacob came home that evening, Leah told him that he had to sleep with her because she had hired him with the mandrakes, and he did. God heeded Leah and she conceived and bore Jacob a fifth son, and called him Issachar, saying that God had given her a reward. Leah bore Jacob a sixth son and called him Zebulun, saying that God had endowed her with a good dowry. And afterwards Leah bore a daughter, and called her name Dinah. God heeded Rachel and she conceived and bore a son and called him Joseph, invoking God to add another son. Then Jacob asked Laban to allow him, his wives, and his children to return to his own country. Laban conceded that God had blessed him for Jacob's sake. The fourth reading ends here.

=== Fifth reading—Genesis 30:28–31:16 ===
In the fifth reading, Laban asked Jacob to name how much he wanted to stay. Jacob recounted how he had served Laban and how Laban had benefited, and asked when he could provide for his own family. Laban pressed him again, so Jacob offered to keep Laban's flock in exchange for the speckled, spotted, and dark sheep and goats, and thus Laban could clearly tell Jacob's flock from his. Laban agreed, but that day he removed the speckled and spotted goats and dark sheep from his flock and gave them to his sons and put three day's distance between Jacob and himself. Jacob peeled white streaks in fresh rods of poplar, almond, and plane trees and set the rods where the flocks would see them when they mated, and the flocks brought forth streaked, speckled, and spotted young. Jacob laid the rods before the eyes of the stronger sheep, but not before the feeble, so the feebler sheep became Laban's and the stronger Jacob's. Jacob's flocks and wealth thus increased. Jacob heard that Laban's sons thought that he had become wealthy at Laban's expense, and Jacob saw that Laban did not regard him as before. God told Jacob to return to the land of his fathers, and that God would be with him. Jacob called Rachel and Leah to the field and told them that Laban had changed his opinion of Jacob, but Jacob had served Laban wholeheartedly and God had remained with Jacob. Jacob noted that Laban had mocked him and changed his wages ten times, but God would not allow him to harm Jacob, but had rewarded Jacob, giving Laban's animals to Jacob. Jacob said that in a dream God told him to return to the land of his birth. Rachel and Leah answered that they no longer had any portion in Laban's house and all the riches that God had taken from Laban were theirs and their children's, so Jacob should do whatever God had told him to do. The fifth reading ends here.

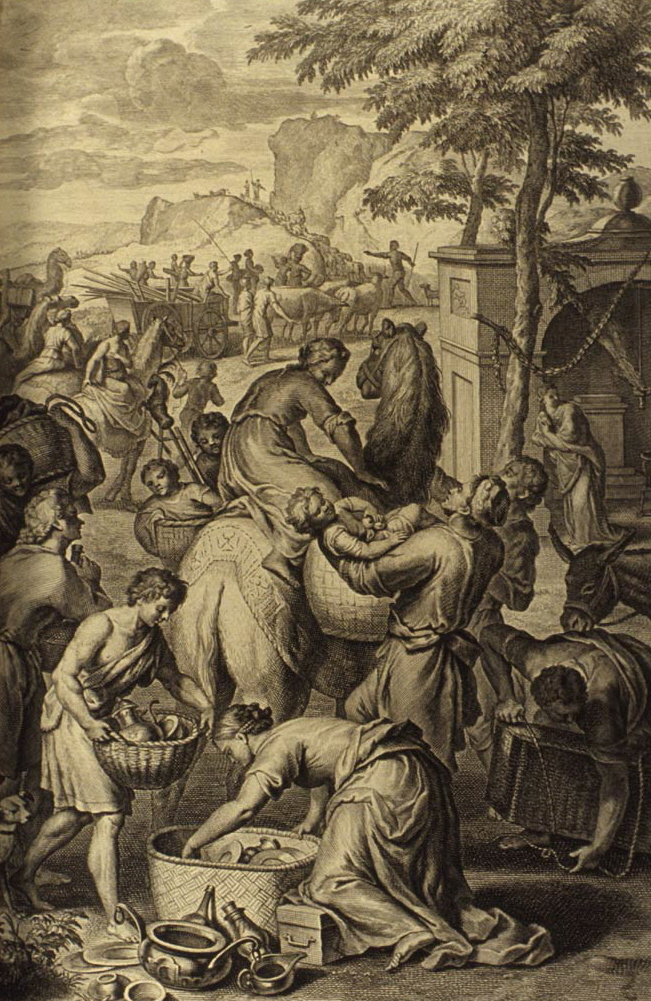
Jacob Flies Away from Laban (illustration from the 1728 Figures de la Bible)

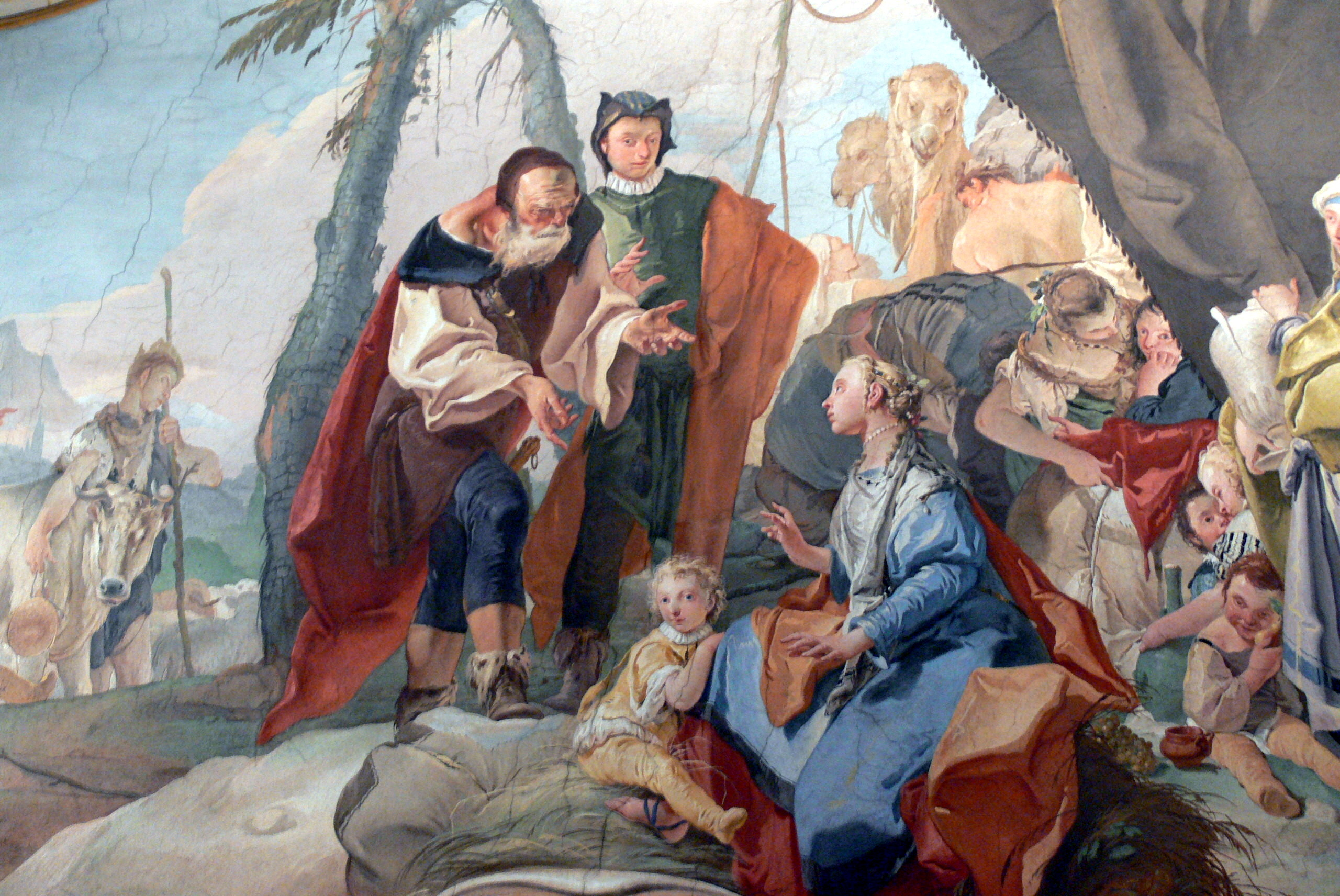
Laban Looks for Idols (18th-century painting by Giovanni Battista Tiepolo)

=== Sixth reading—Genesis 31:17–42 ===
In the sixth reading, Jacob set his sons and his wives on camels and headed out toward Isaac and Canaan with all the animals and wealth that he had collected in Padan-aram. Jacob tricked Laban by fleeing secretly while Laban was out shearing his sheep, and Rachel stole her father's idols. On the third day, Laban heard that Jacob had fled and he and his kin pursued after Jacob seven days, overtaking him in the mountain of Gilead. God came to Laban in a dream and told him not to speak to Jacob either good or bad. But when Laban caught up with Jacob, he asked Jacob what he meant by carrying away his daughters secretly, like captives, without letting him kiss his daughters and grandchildren goodbye. Laban said that while he had the power to harm Jacob, God had told him the previous night not to speak to Jacob either good or bad, and now Laban wanted to know why Jacob had stolen his gods. Jacob answered that he fled secretly out of fear that Laban might take his daughters by force, and not knowing Rachel stole the gods, he told Laban that whoever had his gods would die. Laban searched Jacob's tent, Leah's tent, and the two maid-servants' tent, finding nothing, and then he entered Rachel's tent. Rachel had hidden the idols in the camel's saddle and sat upon them, apologizing to her father for not rising, as she was having her period. Laban searched and felt about the tent, but did not find the idols. Angered, Jacob questioned Laban what he had done to deserve this hot pursuit and this searching. Jacob protested that he had worked for Laban for twenty years, through drought and frost, bearing the loss of animals torn by predators, and not eating Laban's rams, only to have his wages changed ten times. Had not the God of Isaac been on Jacob's side, surely Laban would have sent Jacob away empty, Jacob said, and God had seen his affliction and awarded him what he deserved. The sixth reading ends here.

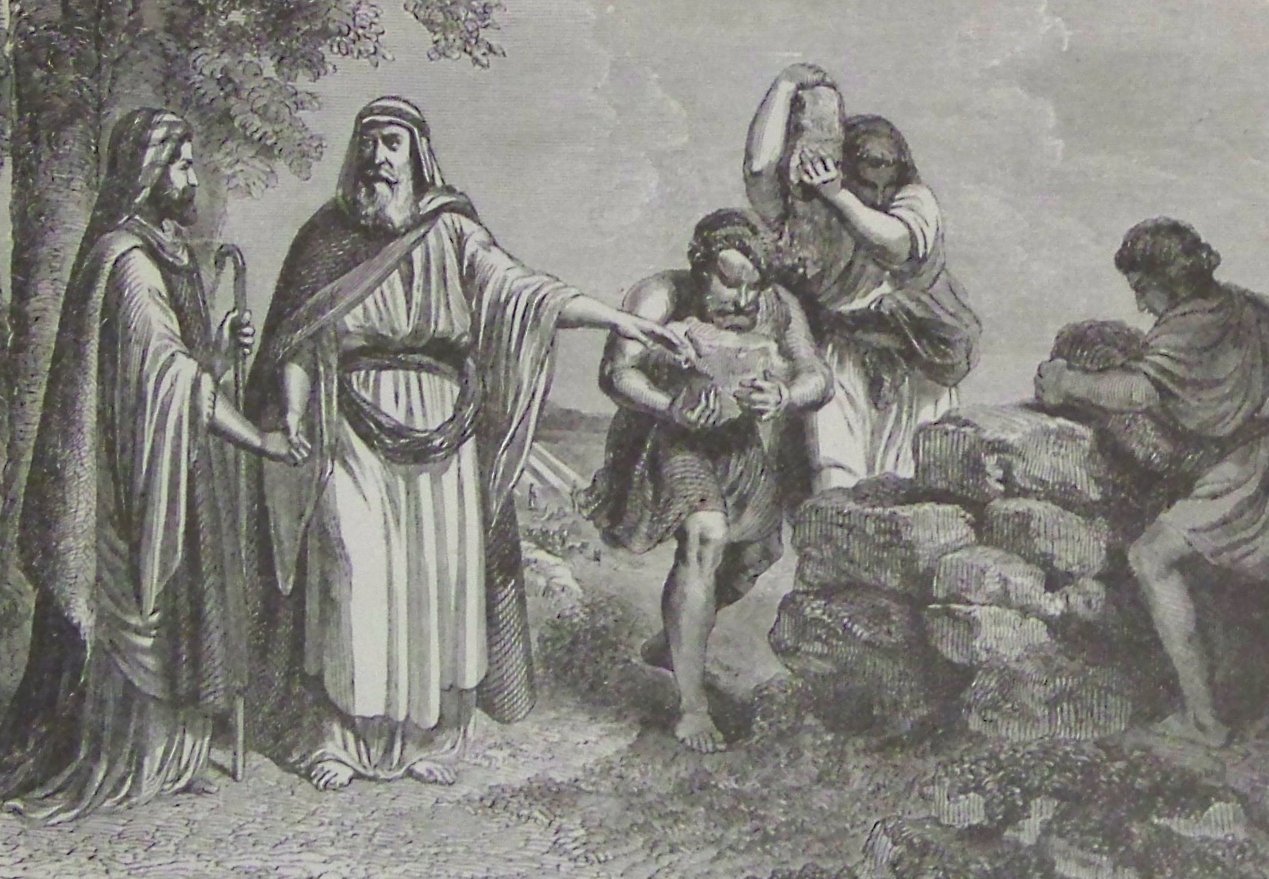
The Heap of Witnesses (illustration from the 1890 Holman Bible)

=== Seventh reading—Genesis 31:43–32:3 ===
In the seventh reading, Laban answered Jacob that they were his daughters, his children, and his flocks, but asked what he could do about it now. Instead, Laban proposed that they make a covenant, and Jacob set up a stone pillar and with his kin heaped stones, and they ate a meal by the heap. Laban called it Jegar-sahadutha, but Jacob called it Galeed. Laban called the heap as a witness between him and Jacob, and invoked God to watch, when they were apart, if Jacob would afflict Laban's daughters and take other wives. And Laban designated the heap and the pillar as a boundary between him and Jacob; Laban would not pass over it to Jacob, and Jacob would not pass over it to Laban, to do harm. Laban invoked the God of Abraham, the God of Nahor, and the God of Terah, and Jacob swore by the Fear of Isaac and offered a sacrifice.

In the maftir (מפטיר) reading of Genesis 32:1–3 that concludes the parashah, early in the morning, Laban kissed his sons and his daughters, blessed them, and departed for his home. And when Jacob went on his way, the angels of God met him, and Jacob told them that this was God's camp, and he called the place Mahanaim. The seventh reading, the single open portion, and the parashah end here.

=== Readings according to the triennial cycle ===
Jews who read the Torah according to the triennial cycle of Torah reading read the parashah according to the following schedule:

	Year 1	Year 2	Year 3
	2022, 2025, 2028 . . .	2023, 2026, 2029 . . .	2024, 2027, 2030 . . .
Reading	28:10–30:13	30:14–31:16	31:17–32:3
1	28:10–12	30:14–16	31:17–21
2	28:13–17	30:17–21	31:22–24
3	28:18–22	30:22–27	31:25–35
4	29:1–8	30:28–36	31:36–42
5	29:9–17	30:37–43	31:43–45
6	29:18–33	31:1–9	31:46–50
7	29:34–30:13	31:10–16	31:51–32:3
Maftir	30:9–13	31:14–16	32:1–3

== In inner-biblical interpretation ==
The parashah has parallels or is discussed in these Biblical sources:

=== Genesis chapter 28 ===
In Genesis 27–28, Jacob received three blessings: (1) he is blessed by Isaac when Jacob was disguised as Esau in Genesis 27:28–29, then (2) by Isaac when Jacob was departing for Haran in Genesis 28:3–4, and (3) by God in Jacob's dream at Bethel in Genesis 28:13–15. Whereas the first blessing was one of material wellbeing and dominance, only the second and third blessings conveyed fertility and the Land of Israel. The first and the third blessings explicitly designated Jacob as the conveyor of blessing, although arguably the second blessing did that as well by giving Jacob "the blessing of Abraham" in Genesis 12:2–3. Only the third blessing vouchsafed God's presence with Jacob.

Genesis 27:28–29 Isaac Blessing the Disguised Jacob	Genesis 28:3–4 Isaac Blessing Jacob on Departure	Genesis 28:13–15 God Blessing Jacob at Bethel
^{28} God give you of the dew of heaven, and of the fat places of the earth, and plenty of corn and wine. ^{29} Let peoples serve you, and nations bow down to you. Be lord over your brethren, and let your mother's sons bow down to you. Cursed be everyone who curses you, and blessed be everyone who blesses you.	^{3} God Almighty bless you, and make you fruitful, and multiply you, that you may be a congregation of peoples; ^{4} and give you the blessing of Abraham, to you, and to your seed with you; that you may inherit the land of your sojournings, which God gave to Abraham.	^{13} I am the Lord, the God of Abraham your father, and the God of Isaac. The land on which you lie, to you will I give it, and to your seed. ^{14} And your seed shall be as the dust of the earth, and you shall spread abroad to the west, and to the east, and to the north, and to the south. And in you and in your seed shall all the families of the earth be blessed. ^{15} And, behold, I am with you, and will keep you wherever you go, and will bring you back into this land; for I will not leave you, until I have done that of which I have spoken to you.

God's blessing to Jacob in Genesis 28:14 that "All the families of the earth shall bless themselves by you and your descendants" parallels God's blessing to Abraham in Genesis 12:3 that "all the families of the earth shall bless themselves by you", and God's blessing to Abraham in Genesis 22:18 that "All the nations of the earth shall bless themselves by your descendants", and is fulfilled by Balaam’s request in Numbers 23:10 to share Israel's fate.

In Genesis 28:18, Jacob took the stone on which he had slept, set it up as a pillar (מַצֵּבָה, matzeivah) and poured oil on the top of it. Exodus 23:24 would later direct the Israelites to break the Canaanites' pillars into pieces (מַצֵּבֹתֵיהֶם, matzeivoteihem). Leviticus 26:1 would direct the Israelites not to rear up a pillar (מַצֵּבָה, matzeivah). And Deuteronomy 16:22 would prohibit them to set up a pillar (מַצֵּבָה, matzeivah) "which the Lord your God hates".

Hosea recounted that at Bethel, Jacob met and communed with God.

=== Genesis chapter 29 ===
Jacob's meeting of Rachel at the well in Genesis 29:1–12 is the Torah's second of several meetings at watering holes that lead to marriage. Also of the same type scene are Abraham's servant's meeting (on behalf of Isaac) of Rebekah at the well in Genesis 24:11–27 and Moses' meeting of Zipporah at the well in Exodus 2:15–21. Each involves (1) a trip to a distant land, (2) a stop at a well, (3) a young woman coming to the well to draw water, (4) a heroic drawing of water, (5) the young woman going home to report to her family, (6) the visiting man brought to the family, and (7) a subsequent marriage.

=== Genesis chapter 30 ===
In Genesis 30:22, God "remembered" Rachel to deliver her from childlessness. Similarly, God "remembered" Noah to deliver him from the flood in Genesis 8:1. Other references to God's "remembering" occur where God promised to remember God's covenant not to destroy the Earth again by flood; God's remembrance of Abraham led God to deliver Lot from the destruction of Sodom and Gomorrah; and God remembered God's covenant with Abraham, Isaac, and Jacob to deliver the Israelites from Egyptian bondage in Exodus 2:24 and 6:5–6.

Moses called on God to remember God's covenant with Abraham, Isaac, and Jacob to deliver the Israelites from God's wrath after the incident of the Golden Calf in Exodus 32:13 and Deuteronomy 9:27; God promised to "remember" God's covenant with Jacob, Isaac, and Abraham to deliver the Israelites and the Land of Israel in Leviticus 26:42–45; the Israelites were to blow upon their trumpets to be remembered and delivered from their enemies in Numbers 10:9; Samson called on God to deliver him from the Philistines in Judges 16:28; Hannah prayed for God to remember her and deliver her from childlessness in 1 Samuel 1:11 and God remembered Hannah's prayer to deliver her from childlessness in 1 Samuel 1:19; and Hezekiah called on God to remember Hezekiah's faithfulness to deliver him from sickness in 2 Kings 20:3 and Isaiah 38:3.

Jeremiah called on God to remember God's covenant with the Israelites to not condemn them in Jeremiah 14:21; Jeremiah called on God to remember him and think of him, and avenge him of his persecutors in Jeremiah 15:15; God promises to remember God's covenant with the Israelites and establish an everlasting covenant in Ezekiel 16:60.

In the Book of Psalms, God remembers the cry of the humble in Zion to avenge them in Psalm 9:13; David called upon God to remember God's compassion and mercy in Psalm 25:6; Asaph called on God to remember God's congregation to deliver them from their enemies in Psalm 74:2; God remembered that the Israelites were only human in Psalm 78:39; Ethan the Ezrahite called on God to remember how short Ethan's life was in Psalm 89:48; God remembers that humans are but dust in Psalm 103:14; God remembers God's covenant with Abraham, Isaac, and Jacob in Psalm 105:8–10; God remembers God's word to Abraham to deliver the Israelites to the Land of Israel in Psalm 105:42–44; the Psalmist calls on God to remember him to favor God's people, to think of him at God's salvation, that he might behold the prosperity of God's people in Psalm 106:4–5; God remembered God's covenant and repented according to God's mercy to deliver the Israelites in the wake of their rebellion and iniquity in Psalm 106:4–5; the Psalmist calls on God to remember God's word to God's servant to give him hope in Psalm 119:49; and God remembered "us" (God's people) in our low estate to deliver us from our adversaries in Psalm 136:23–24.

Job called on God to remember him to deliver him from God's wrath in Job 14:13. Finally, after the Babylonian captivity, Nehemiah prayed to God to remember God's promise to Moses to deliver the Israelites from exile in Nehemiah 1:8 and Nehemiah asked God to remember him to deliver him for good in Nehemiah 13:14–31.

=== Genesis chapter 31 ===
Jacob, in his discussion with his wives, says that the angel of God had spoken to him in a dream referring to God as "the God of Bethel" recalling the place where Jacob had dreamt in Genesis 28:13–15.

== In classical rabbinic interpretation ==
The parashah is discussed in these rabbinic sources from the era of the Mishnah and the Talmud:

=== Genesis chapter 28 ===
Rabbi Judan taught in Rabbi Aibu's name that the words of Proverbs 12:13, "the righteous comes out of trouble," allude to Jacob, as Genesis 28:10 reports, "And Jacob went out from Beer-sheba" (and away from Esau, who sought to kill him).

A midrash noted that Genesis 24:10 reports that Abraham sent Eliezer to woo Rebekah with ten camels and "having all goodly things of his master's in his hand," but Jacob traveled to Haran without a single ring or bracelet. Rabbi Ḥaninah taught that Isaac sent Jacob away empty-handed. Rabbi Joshua, however, taught that Isaac sent Jacob well provided, but Esau robbed him of all he had. The midrash taught that Jacob then thought to himself that he would not lose confidence in God, for as Psalm 121:2 teaches, his help would come from God. As Psalm 121:3 teaches, God would not suffer his foot to be moved (לַמּוֹט, la-mot) and the midrash taught that this meant that God would not allow Jacob to die (la-mayt). As Psalm 121:7 teaches, God would keep him from all evil, and thus from the evil Esau and Laban. And Psalm 121:8 teaches, God would guard his going out, and thus as Genesis 28:10 reports, "Jacob went out from Beer-sheba."

Hezekiah taught that Jacob was 63 years old when Isaac blessed him (as a Baraita taught), and Jacob spent another 14 years secluded in the Land of Israel studying under Eber and a further 7 years working for the Matriarchs. Thus, he married at the age of 84, whereas Esau married at the age of 40 (as Genesis 26:34 reports). Thus we learn that God hastens the happiness of the wicked and delays that of the righteous.

Rabbi Hoshaya noted that Genesis 28:7 already stated, "And Jacob hearkened to his father and his mother, and was gone to Paddan-aram," and thus Rabbi Hoshaya asked why Genesis 28:10 says, "and Jacob went out from Beer-sheba." Rabbi Hoshaya taught that Jacob reasoned that when his father desired to emigrate from the Land of Israel, he first sought permission at Beer-sheba, so Jacob too went to Beer-sheba to seek God's permission.

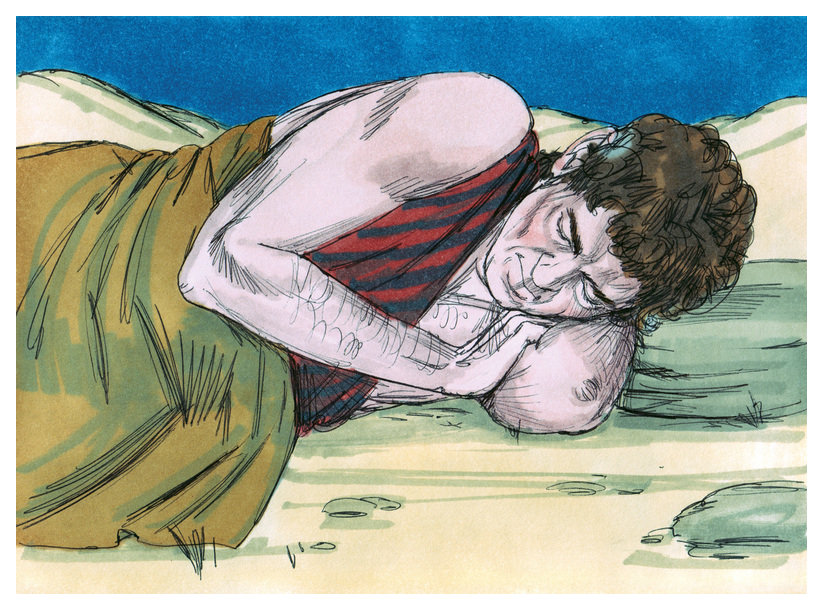
Jacob took one of the stones, put it under his head, and lay down to sleep (1984 illustration by Jim Padgett, courtesy of Distant Shores Media/Sweet Publishing)

Rabbi Judan and Rav Huna commented on why Genesis 28:10 says, "and Jacob went out from Beer-sheba." Rabbi Judan taught that it means that Jacob sought to leave "out of the well of the oath." (Be'er, בְּאֵר, means "well," and Rabbi Judan connected sheba, שָׁבַע, with shevuah, שְּׁבֻעָה, which means "oath," as in the oath that Genesis 21:31 reports Abraham and Abimelech swore to each other.) Rabbi Judan taught that Jacob reasoned that he did not want Abimelech to demand that Jacob swear to Abimelech (a commitment of nonaggression) as Jacob's grandfather Abraham swore to him, and so delay Jacob's descendants from entering the Land of Israel for seven generations. (As a result of Abraham's oath to Abimelech, seven generations—from Abraham to Joshua—passed before the Israelites entered the Land of Israel. Thus, to avoid another seven generations of delay, Jacob went "out of the well of the oath" to evade a further commitment of nonaggression.) Rav Huna taught that the words of Genesis 28:10 mean "out of the well of the birthright." Rav Huna taught that Jacob reasoned that he did not wish to allow Esau to confront him and assert that Jacob had cheated him by taking his birthright, and thus lose the advantage of Esau's oath (when Esau conveyed his birthright in Genesis 25:33). Rabbi Berekiah taught that the words of Genesis 28:10 mean "out of the well of the blessings." Rabbi Berekiah taught that Jacob reasoned that he did not want Esau to confront him and assert that Jacob had cheated Esau of his blessings, and so waste his mother Rebekah's labors on his behalf.

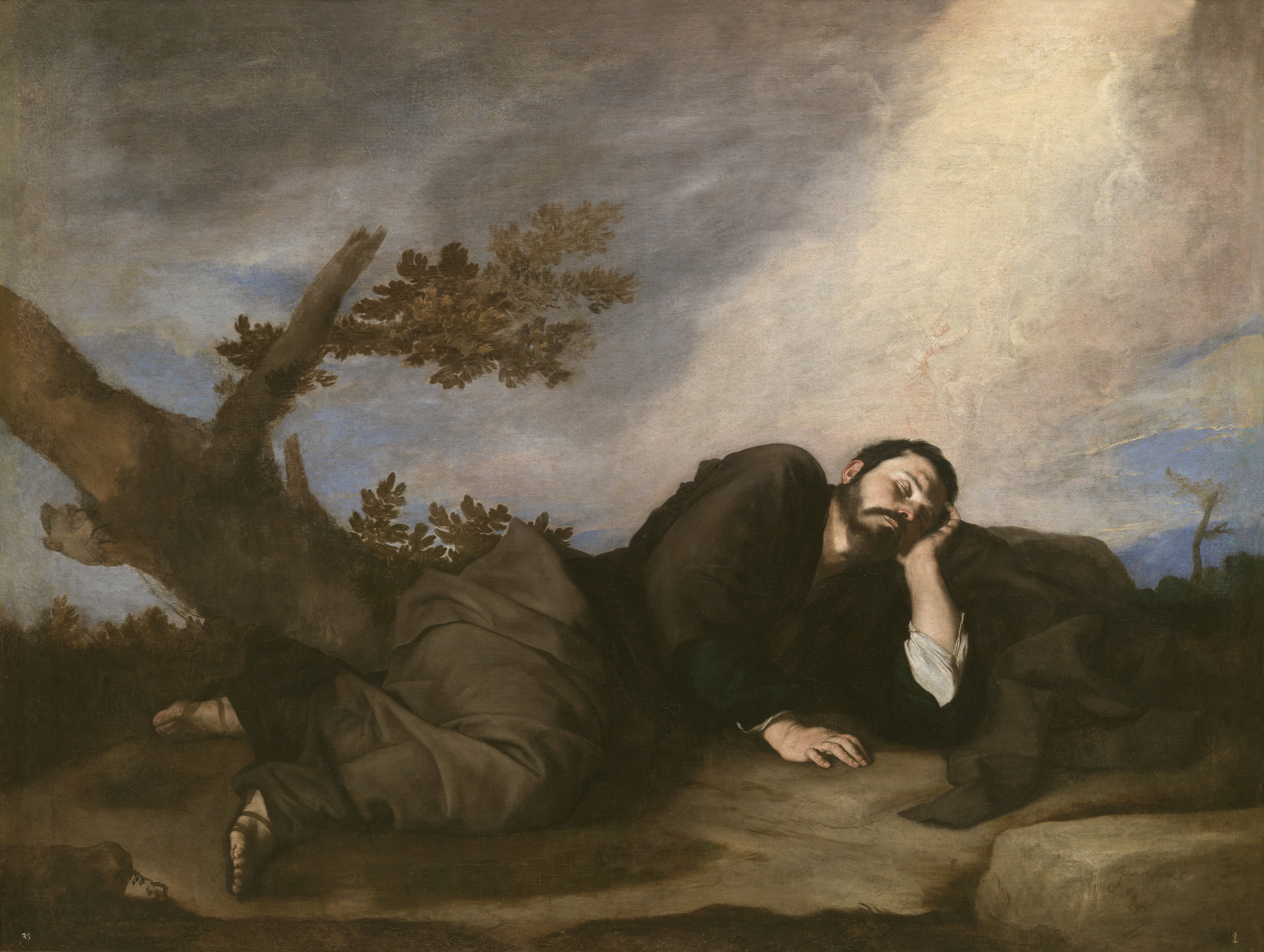
Jacob's Dream (1639 painting by Jusepe de Ribera)

Our Rabbis taught that Jacob reached Haran on that same day as Genesis 28:10 reports that he "went toward Haran." Rabbi Berekiah said in Rabbi Isaac's name, however, that Genesis 28:10 merely speaks as people do colloquially when they say, "So-and-so has gone to Caesarea," when in fact So-and-so has not actually arrived in Caesarea. (Similarly, here Genesis 28:10 does not mean that Jacob reached Haran on the same day that he set out.)

Once in the meat market of Emmaus, Rabbi Akiva asked Rabban Gamaliel and Rabbi Joshua about the words of Genesis 32:32, "And the sun rose on him," inquiring whether the sun rose on only him and not on everyone. Rabbi Isaac said that it meant that the sun which had set early for his sake now rose early for him. Rabbi Isaac noted that Genesis 28:10 reports that Jacob left Beersheba in the south of the Land of Israel and went toward Haran north of the Land, and Genesis 28:11 reports that "he lighted upon the place" identified (in Genesis 28:10–22) as Bethel in the center of the Land. Rabbi Isaac explained that when he reached Haran, he asked himself how he could have passed through the place where his fathers had prayed and not have prayed there too. So Rabbi Isaac deduced that he immediately resolved to turn back, and as soon he did, the earth contracted and he immediately "lighted upon the place." After he prayed, he sought to return to Haran, but God chose to give this righteous man a night's rest and immediately (as Genesis 28:11 reports) "the sun was set."

In a midrash, the Rabbis interpreted the words of Genesis 28:11, "because the sun had set," to teach that God caused the sun to set before its proper time so as to speak with Jacob privately. The midrash likened this to a king who ordered his lamps and lanterns extinguished so that he could speak with his visiting friend privately.

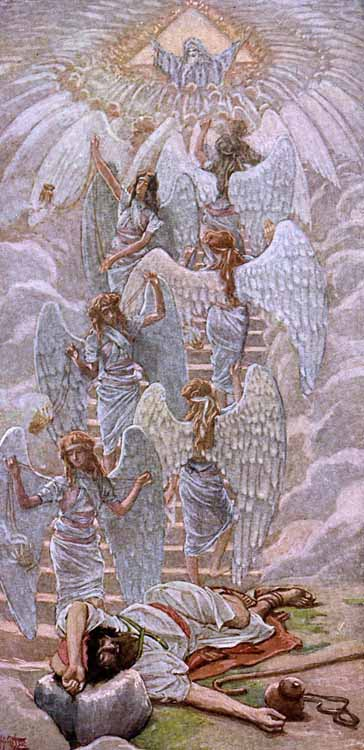
Jacob's Dream (watercolor circa 1896–1902 by James Tissot)

Reading the words, "And he lighted upon the place," in Genesis 28:11 to mean, "And he met the Divine Presence (Shechinah)" Rav Huna asked in Rabbi Ammi's name why Genesis 28:11 assigns to God the name "the Place." Rav Huna explained that it is because God is the Place of the world (the world is contained in God, and not God in the world). Rabbi Jose ben Halafta taught that we do not know whether God is the place of God's world or whether God's world is God's place, but from Exodus 33:21, which says, "Behold, there is a place with Me," it follows that God is the place of God's world, but God's world is not God's place. Rabbi Isaac taught that reading Deuteronomy 33:27, "The eternal God is a dwelling place," one cannot know whether God is the dwelling-place of God's world or whether God's world is God's dwelling-place. But reading Psalm 90:1, "Lord, You have been our dwelling-place," it follows that God is the dwelling-place of God's world, but God's world is not God's dwelling-place. And Rabbi Abba ben Judan taught that God is like a warrior riding a horse with the warrior's robes flowing over on both sides of the horse. The horse is subsidiary to the rider, but the rider is not subsidiary to the horse. Thus Habakkuk 3:8 says, "You ride upon Your horses, upon Your chariots of victory."

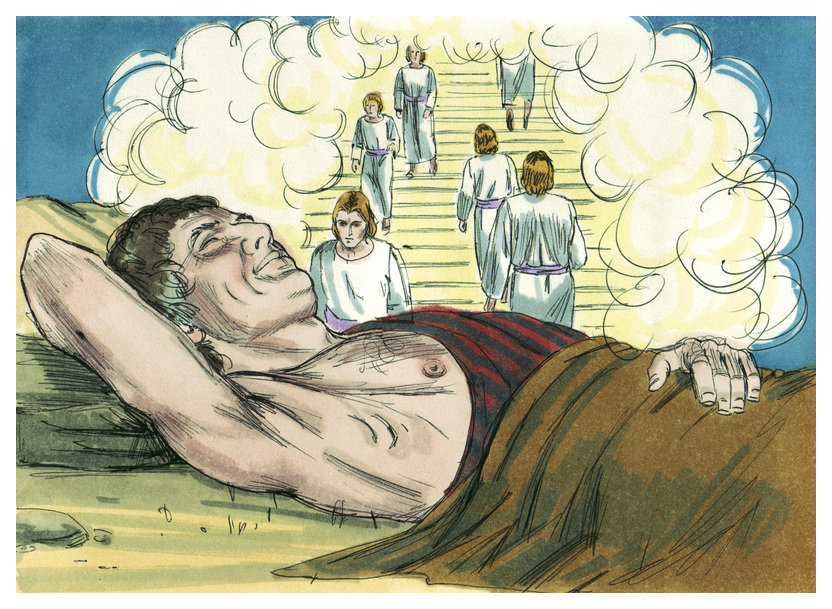
In his dream he saw a stairway reaching from Earth to Heaven. (1984 illustration by Jim Padgett, courtesy of Distant Shores Media/Sweet Publishing)

The Gemara noted that Genesis 28:11 reports that "he took of the stones of the place" (in the plural) but Genesis 28:18 reports that "he took the stone" (in the singular). Rabbi Isaac deduced that all the stones gathered themselves together into the same place so as to be the stone upon which this righteous man would rest his head, and as a Tanna taught in a Baraita, all the stones merged into one.

Rabbi Judah, Rabbi Nehemiah, and the Rabbis debated how to interpret the plural words "stones" in Genesis 28:11. Rabbi Judah taught that Jacob took 12 stones, because God had decreed that there would be 12 tribes. Jacob thought that Abraham and Isaac had not produced those 12 descendants, and if these 12 stones joined with one another, then Jacob would know that he would father those 12 tribes. When the 12 stones did join together, he knew that he would father the 12 tribes. Rabbi Nehemiah taught that Jacob took three stones. Jacob thought that God conferred God's name upon Abraham and God conferred God's name upon Isaac. Jacob thought that if these three stones joined together, then he would know that God would confer God's name upon Jacob. When the three stones did join together, he knew that God would confer God's name upon him. The Rabbis taught that the minimum number of "stones" (to warrant the text's use of the plural) is two. Jacob thought that Abraham fathered Ishmael and all the sons of Keturah, who did not inherit the promise. Isaac fathered Esau and Esau's descendants did not inherit the promise. Jacob thought that if these two stones joined together, then he would know that all of his sons would inherit the promise.

Rabbi Levi taught that on the night described in Genesis 28:10–15, God showed Jacob all the signs. God showed Jacob a ladder standing from the earth to the heaven, as Genesis 28:12 says, "And he dreamed, and behold a ladder set up on the earth, and the top of it reached to heaven." And Rabbi Levi taught that the ministering angels were ascending and descending on the ladder, and they saw the face of Jacob, and they said that Jacob's was the face like the face of one of the living creatures (חַיּוֹת, chayot) that Ezekiel saw in Ezekiel 1:5–10 on the Throne of Glory. The angels who had been on earth ascended to see Jacob's face. Some angels ascended and some descended, as Genesis 28:12 says, "And behold the angels of God were ascending and descending on it." Rabbi Levi taught that God showed Jacob the four kingdoms, their rule and their destruction. God showed Jacob the prince of the kingdom of Babylon ascending 70 rungs and descending. God showed Jaocb the prince of the kingdom of Media ascending 52 rungs and descending. God showed Jacob the prince of the kingdom of Greece ascending 180 rungs and descending. And God showed Jacob the prince of the kingdom of Edom (Rome) ascending, and he was not descending, but was saying (in the words of Isaiah 14:14), "I will ascend above the heights of the clouds; I will be like the Most High." Jacob replied to him (in the words of Isaiah 14:15): "Yet you shall be brought down to Sheol, to the uttermost parts of the pit." God affirmed that this would be so, even (in the words of Jeremiah 49:16), "though you should make your nest as high as the eagle."

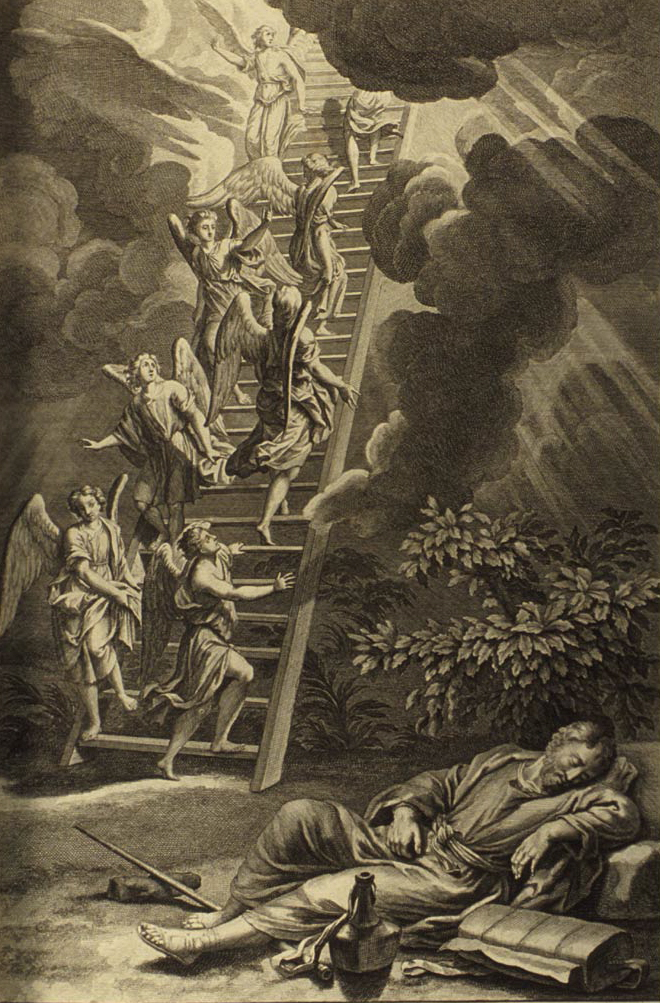
Jacob's Ladder (illustration from the 1728 Figures de la Bible)

Rabbi Joshua ben Levi (according to the Jerusalem Talmud and Genesis Rabbah) or a Baraita in accordance with the opinion of Rabbi Yose the son of Rabbi Ḥaninah (according to the Babylonian Talmud) said that the three daily prayers derived from the Patriarchs, and cited Genesis 28:11 for the proposition that Jews derived the evening prayer from Jacob, arguing that within the meaning of Genesis 28:11, "came upon" (וַיִּפְגַּע, vayifga) meant "pray," just as a similar word (יִפְגְּעוּ, yifge'u) did in Jeremiah 27:18 (according to the Jerusalem Talmud) or another similar word (תִּפְגַּע, tifga) did in Jeremiah 7:16 (according to the Babylonian Talmud and Genesis Rabbah).

Bar Kappara taught that every dream has its interpretation. The "ladder" in Genesis 28:12 symbolizes the stairway leading up to the altar in the Temple in Jerusalem. "Set upon the earth" implies the altar, as Exodus 20:21 says, "An altar of earth you shall make for Me." "And the top of it reached to heaven" implies the sacrifices, the odor of which ascended to heaven. "The angels of God" symbolize the High Priests. "Ascending and descending on it" describes the priests ascending and descending the stairway of the altar. And the words "and, behold, the Lord stood beside him" in Genesis 28:13 once again invoke the altar, as in Amos 9:1, the prophet reports, "I saw the Lord standing beside the altar."

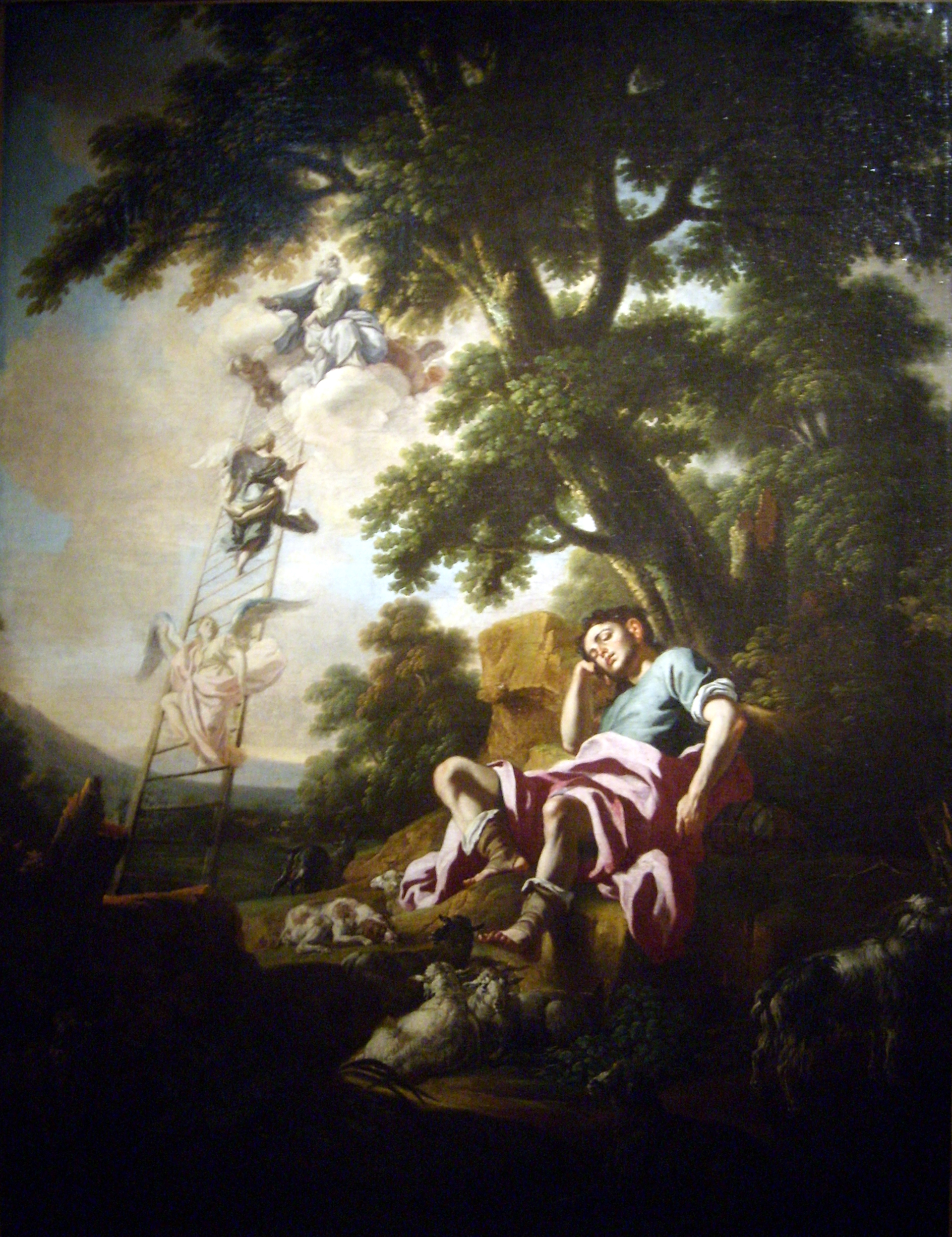
The Dream of Jacob (1835 painting by the school of Francesco Solimena)

The Rabbis related Jacob's dream in Genesis 28:12–13 to Sinai. The "ladder" symbolizes Mount Sinai. That the ladder is "set upon (מֻצָּב, mutzav) the earth" recalls Exodus 19:17, which says, "And they stood (וַיִּתְיַצְּבוּ, vayityatzvu) at the nether part of the mount." The words of Genesis 28:12, "and the top of it reached to heaven," echo those of Deuteronomy 4:11, "And the mountain burned with fire to the heart of heaven." "And behold the angels of God" alludes to Moses and Aaron. "Ascending" parallels Exodus 19:3: "And Moses went up to God." "And descending" parallels Exodus 19:14: "And Moses went down from the mount." And the words "and behold, the Lord stood beside him" in Genesis 28:13 parallel the words of Exodus 19:20: "And the Lord came down upon Mount Sinai."

Interpreting Jacob's dream of a ladder in Genesis 28:12, a Tanna taught that the width of the ladder was 8,000 parasangs (perhaps 24,000 miles). The Tanna noted that Genesis 28:12 reports "the angels of God ascending and descending on it," and thus deduced from the plural that at least two angels were ascending and two descending, and when they came to the same place on the ladder, there were four angels abreast. And Daniel 10:6 reports of an angel that "His body was like the Tarshish," and by tradition the sea of Tarshish is 2,000 parasangs long.

Genesis 28:12–15 reports that Jacob "had a dream." And Genesis 31:24 reports that "God appeared to Laban the Aramean in a dream by night." The Gemara taught that a dream is a sixtieth part of prophecy. Rabbi Hanan taught that even if the Master of Dreams (an angel, in a dream that truly foretells the future) tells a person that on the next day the person will die, the person should not desist from prayer, for as Ecclesiastes 5:6 says, "For in the multitude of dreams are vanities and also many words, but fear God." (Although a dream may seem reliably to predict the future, it will not necessarily come true; one must place one's trust in God.) Rabbi Samuel bar Naḥman said in the name of Rabbi Jonathan that a person is shown in a dream only what is suggested by the person's own thoughts (while awake), as Daniel 2:29 says, "As for you, oh King, your thoughts came into your mind upon your bed," and Daniel 2:30 says, "That you may know the thoughts of the heart." When Samuel had a bad dream, he used to quote Zechariah 10:2, "The dreams speak falsely." When he had a good dream, he used to question whether dreams speak falsely, seeing as in Numbers 10:2, God says, "I speak with him in a dream?" Rava pointed out the potential contradiction between Numbers 10:2 and Zechariah 10:2. The Gemara resolved the contradiction, teaching that Numbers 10:2, "I speak with him in a dream?" refers to dreams that come through an angel, whereas Zechariah 10:2, "The dreams speak falsely," refers to dreams that come through a demon.

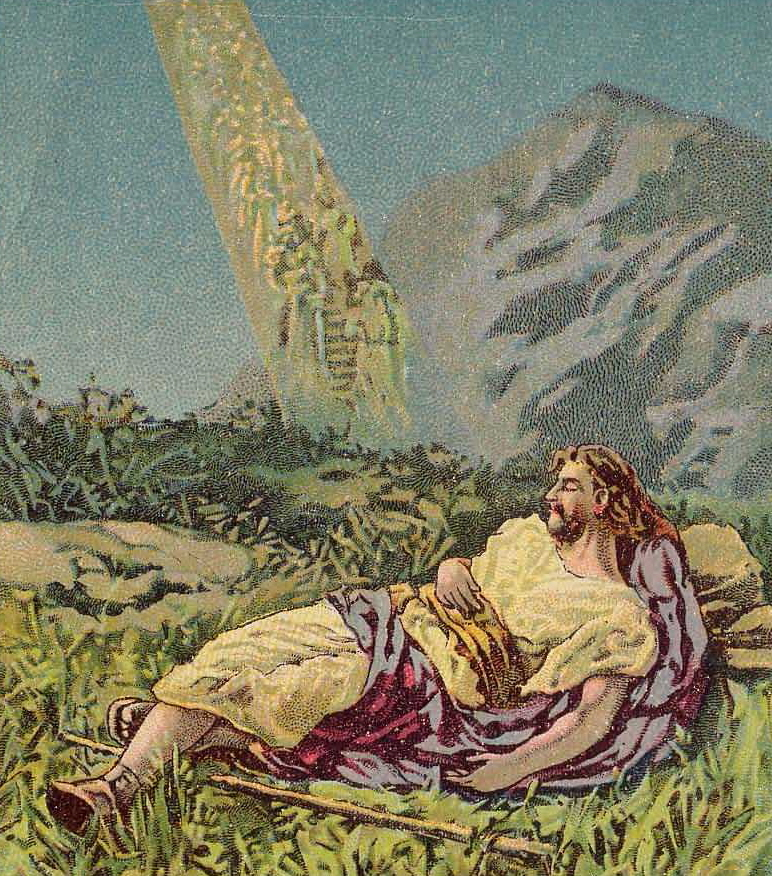
Jacob at Bethel (illustration from a Bible card published 1900 by the Providence Lithograph Company)

A midrash taught that those angels who escort a person in the Land of Israel do not escort that person outside of the Land. Thus "the angels of God ascending" in Genesis 28:12 refers to those who had escorted Jacob in the Land of Israel (who were then returning to heaven) while "descending" refers to those who were to escort him outside of the Land.

A Tanna taught that the angels ascended to look at the sight of Jacob above and descended to look at the sight below, and they wished to hurt him, and thus immediately (as Genesis 28:13 reports) "the Lord stood beside him." Rabbi Simeon ben Lakish said that were it not expressly stated in the Scripture, we would not dare to say it, but God is made to appear like a man who fans his son to protect him from the heat.

Rabbi Joḥanan taught that the wicked stand over their gods, as Genesis 41:1 says, "And Pharaoh dreamed, and behold, he stood over the river." (The Egyptians worshiped the Nile as a god.) But God stands over them, as Genesis 28:13 says, "and behold, the Lord stood over him." (Thus, idolaters must stand over and protect their idols, but God protects God's people.)

The Gemara asked what the significance was of God's promise in Genesis 28:13 to give Jacob "the land on which you lie," which would have been about six feet of land. Rabbi Isaac deduced that God rolled up the whole Land of Israel and put it under Jacob, thus indicating that his descendants would easily conquer it.

The Gemara cited the accounts of Genesis 28:13 and 33:9 to demonstrate Jacob's trust in God. The Gemara taught that God punished Moses for complaining to God in Exodus 5:23, "Since I came to Pharaoh to speak in Your name, he has done evil to this people, neither have You delivered Your people at all." The Gemara told that God replied to Moses by lamenting that the Patriarchs were gone, as several times God had revealed God's Self to Abraham, Isaac, and Jacob as God Almighty (El Shaddai), and they did not question God's ways as Moses had. Regarding Jacob, in Genesis 28:13, God told Jacob, "The land upon which you lie, to you I will give it," but Jacob sought a place to pitch his tent and did not find one until (as Genesis 33:19) he purchased it for one hundred coins, and still Jacob did not question God's ways.

A midrash taught that God's promise to Jacob in Genesis 28:13, "The land whereon you lie, to you will I give it, and to your seed," caused Jacob to ask Joseph in Genesis 47:29, "Bury me not, I pray, in Egypt." The midrash taught that God's promise in Genesis 28:13, "The land whereon you lie, to you will I give it, and to your seed," implied that if Jacob lay in the land, it would be his, but if not, it would not be his.

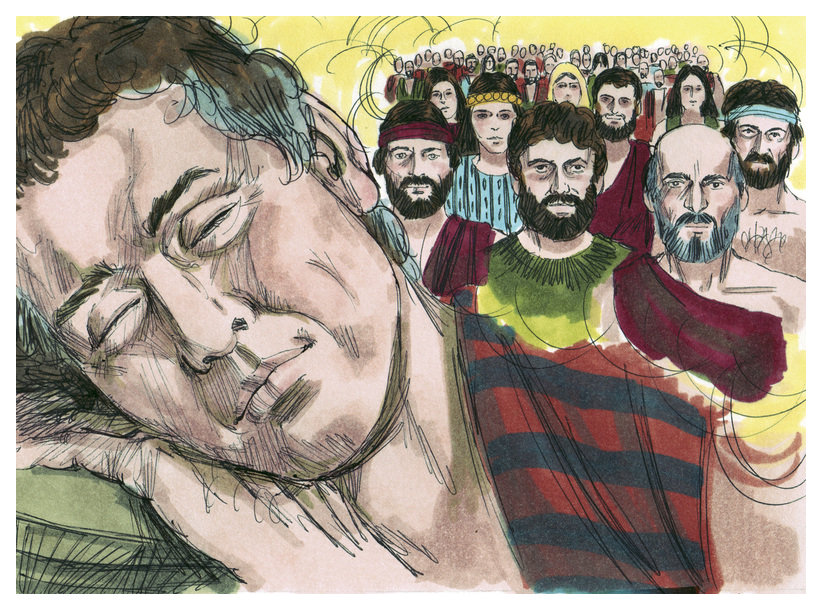
The Lord promised Jacob many descendants. (1984 illustration by Jim Padgett, courtesy of Distant Shores Media/Sweet Publishing)

Rabbi Judan said that Jacob declared that Isaac blessed him with five blessings, and God correspondingly appeared five times to Jacob and blessed him (Genesis 28:13–15, 31:3, 31:11–13, 35:1, and 35:9–12). And thus, in Genesis 46:1, Jacob "offered sacrifices to the God of his father Isaac," and not to the God of Abraham and Isaac. Rabbi Judan also said that Jacob wanted to thank God for permitting Jacob to see the fulfillment of those blessings. And the blessing that was fulfilled was that of Genesis 27:29, "Let people serve you, and nations bow down to you," which was fulfilled regarding Joseph. (And thus Jacob mentioned Isaac then on going down to witness Joseph's greatness.)

Rabbi Joḥanan in the name of Rabbi Jose cited Genesis 28:14 for the proposition that the delight of the Sabbath is specifically the portion of the descendants of Israel, not those of Abraham or Isaac. Rabbi Joḥanan taught in the name of Rabbi Jose that God gives a boundless portion—a very large reward—to anyone who delights in the Sabbath, for Isaiah 58:13–14 promises: "If you keep your feet from violating the Sabbath, from pursuing your affairs on My holy day, and you call the Sabbath a delight, the Lord's holy day honored, and you honor it by not going your own way, or attending to your own matters or speaking idle words, then you shall delight in the Lord and I will cause you to ride on the heights of the world, and to feast on the inheritance of Jacob your father, as the mouth of God has spoken." The reward for delighting in the Sabbath is thus specifically the portion of Jacob, not that of Abraham, about whom Genesis 13:17 says, "Rise, walk through the land through its length and its width because I have given it to you"—that is, the land of Israel alone. And not that of Isaac, about whom Genesis 26:3 says, "Dwell in this land and I will be with you and I will bless you because I will give all of these lands to you and your offspring"—meaning those lands and no others. Rather, it is the inheritance of Jacob, about whom Genesis 28:14 says, "And your offspring will be like the dust of the earth, and you will spread out to the west and to the east and to the north and to the south, and all of the families of the land will be blessed through you and your offspring"—implying that there are no boundaries to Jacob's portion.

Rabbi Akiva taught that for Jacob's sake God divided the sea for Jacob's descendants, for in Genesis 28:14, God told Jacob, "You shall spread abroad to the west, and to the east."

The Rabbis taught that God's promise in Genesis 28:15, "and behold, I am with you, and will keep you wherever you go," answered all of Jacob's requests, except that for sustenance. Jacob prayed in Genesis 28:20, "If God will be with me," and God assured Jacob, "Behold, I am with you." Jacob prayed, "And will keep me," and God assured Jacob, "And I will keep you." Jacob prayed, "In this way that I go," and God assured Jacob, "wherever you go." Jacob prayed in Genesis 28:21, "So that I come back to my father's house in peace," and God assured Jacob, "and will bring you back." But the Rabbis taught that God did not answer Jacob's request for sustenance. Rabbi Assi, however, taught that God answered Jacob's request for sustenance, too, for in Genesis 28:15, God says, "for I will not forsake you," and forsaking applies to sustenance, as in Psalm 37:25, "Yet I have not seen the righteous forsaken, nor his seed begging bread."

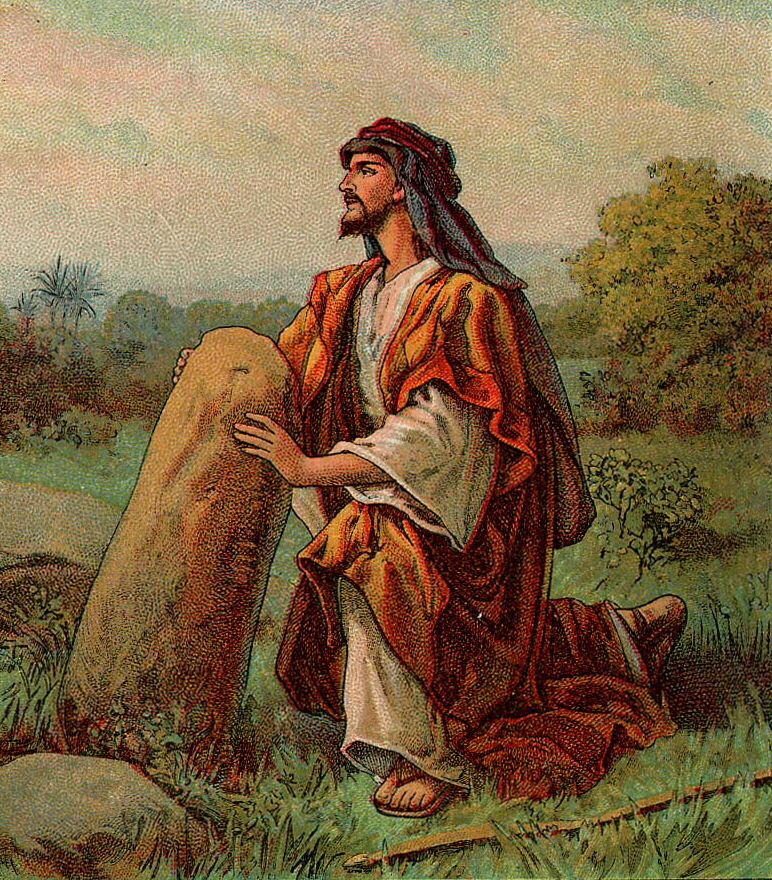
Jacob's Vision and God's Promise (illustration from a Bible card published 1906 by the Providence Lithograph Company)

Rabbi Jacob bar Idi pointed out a contradiction between God's promise to protect Jacob in Genesis 28:15 and Jacob's fear in Genesis 32:8; Rabbi Jacob explained that Jacob feared that some sin might cause him to lose the protection of God's promise.

Rabbi Elazar noted that Isaiah 2:3 says, "And many peoples shall go and say: 'Go and let us go up to the mountain of the Lord, to the house of the God of Jacob,'" and asked why the verse refers only to Jacob, and not to Abraham and Isaac. Rabbi Elazar explained that the Temple will ultimately be described in the same way that Jacob referred to it in Genesis 28:19. It will not be referred to as it was referred to by Abraham, for when he prayed at the location of the Temple mount, he called it "mount," as Genesis 22:14 says, "As it is said on this day: On the mount where the Lord is seen." And it will not be referred to as it was referred to by Isaac, for he called the location of the Temple "field" when he prayed there, as Genesis 24:63 says, "And Isaac went out to meditate in the field." Rather, it will be described as Jacob referred to it, as a house, as Genesis 28:19 says, "And he called the name of that place Beth-El," which means "house of God."

Reading the words "and Jacob vowed a vow" in Genesis 28:20, a midrash taught that of four who made vows, two vowed and profited, and two vowed and lost. The Israelites vowed and profited in Numbers 21:2–3, and Hannah vowed and profited in 1 Samuel 1:11–20. Jephthah vowed and lost in Judges 11:30–40, and Jacob vowed in Genesis 28:20 and lost (some say in the loss of Rachel in Genesis 35:18 and some say in the disgrace of Dinah in Genesis 34:2, for Jacob's vow in Genesis 28:20 was superfluous, as Jacob had already received God's promise, and therefore Jacob lost because of it).

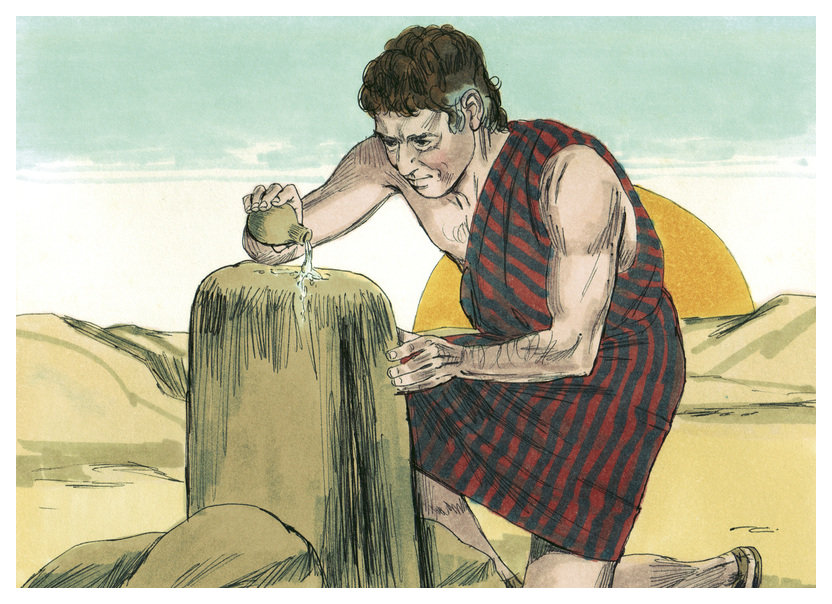
Jacob poured oil on the stone (1984 illustration by Jim Padgett, courtesy of Distant Shores Media/Sweet Publishing)

Reading the words, "love the stranger, in giving him food and clothing," in Deuteronomy 10:18, Akilas the proselyte asked Rabbi Eliezer whether food and clothing constituted all the benefit of conversion to Judaism. Rabbi Eliezer replied that food and clothing are no small things, for in Genesis 28:20, Jacob prayed to God for "bread to eat, and clothing to put on," while God comes and offers it to the convert on a platter. Akilas then visited Rabbi Joshua, who taught that bread refers to the Torah (as in Proverbs 9:5, Wisdom—the Torah—says, "Come, eat of my bread") while clothing means the Torah scholar's cloak. A person privileged to study the Torah is thus privileged to perform God's precepts. Moreover, converts' daughters could marry into the priesthood, so that their descendants could offer burnt offerings on the altar. The midrash offered another interpretation: bread refers to the showbread, while clothing refers to the priestly vestments. The midrash offered yet another interpretation: bread refers to challah, while clothing refers to the first shearings of the sheep, both of which belong to the priests.

The Tosefta deduced from Genesis 28:21 that Jacob spoke as if God was not Jacob's God when Jacob was not in the land of Canaan.

Rabbi Ilai taught that the Sages ordained at Usha that if a person wishes to give charity liberally, the person should not give away more than a fifth of the person's wealth. Rav Naḥman (or some say Rav Aha bar Jacob) cited Genesis 28:22 as proof for the proposition, as in the words "And of all that You shall give me, I will surely give a tenth to You," repetition of the verb to give a tenth or tithe implies two tenths or one fifth. The Gemara did the math and questioned whether the second tenth would not be less than the first tenth, as it would be taken from the nine-tenths that remained after the first tenth had been given away and thereby represented only 1/10 x 9/10 = 9/100 of the original capital. Rav Ashi replied that the words "I will . . . give a tenth of it" in Genesis 28:22 implied that he would make the second like the first.

The Pirke de Rabbi Eliezer taught that Jacob wished to ford the Jabbok and was detained there by an angel, who asked Jacob whether Jacob had not told God (in Genesis 28:22), "Of all that you shall give me I will surely give a tenth to You." So Jacob gave a tenth of all the cattle that he had brought from Paddan-Aram. Jacob had brought some 5,500 animals, so his tithe came to 550 animals. Jacob again tried to ford the Jabbok but was hindered again. The angel once again asked Jacob whether Jacob had not told God (in Genesis 28:22), "Of all that you shall give me I will surely give a tenth to You." The angel noted that Jacob had sons and that Jacob had not given a tithe of them. So Jacob set aside the four firstborn sons (whom the law excluded from the tithe) of each of the four mothers, and eight sons remained. He began to count from Simeon, and included Benjamin, and continued the count from the beginning. And so Levi was reckoned as the tenth son, and thus the tithe, holy to God, as Leviticus 27:32 says, "The tenth shall be holy to the Lord." So the angel Michael descended and took Levi and brought him up before the Throne of Glory and told God that Levi was God's lot. And God blessed him, that the sons of Levi should minister on earth before God (as directed in Deuteronomy 10:8) like the ministering angels in heaven.

Rabbi Berekiah and Rabbi Ahi taught in the name of Rabbi Samuel bar Naḥman that Jacob would not have told God, "of all that You shall give me, I will surely give a tenth to You," in Genesis 28:22 unless God had already offered Jacob, "Ask what I shall give you," as God offered Solomon in 1 Kings 3:5. Rabbi Jonathan taught that God invited three people to ask what God could give them: Solomon in 1 Kings 3:5, Ahaz in Isaiah 7:11, and the Messiah in Psalm 2:8. Rabbi Berekiah and Rabbi Ahi in the name of Rabbi Samuel bar Naḥman cited two more: Abraham in Genesis 15:2 and Jacob in Genesis 28:22, teaching that neither Patriarch would have asked God unless God had first offered to give them what they asked.

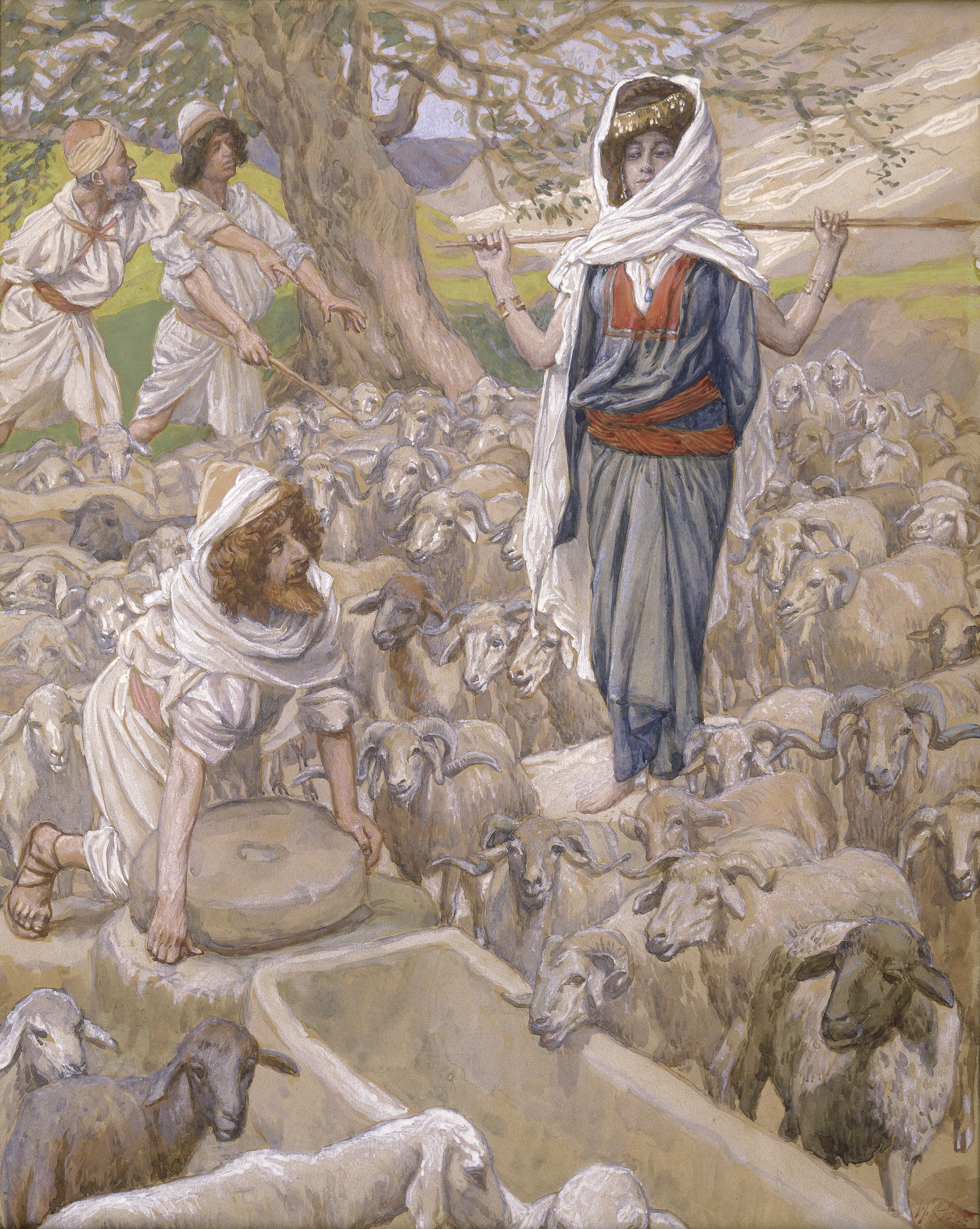
Jacob and Rachel at the Well (watercolor circa 1896–1902 by James Tissot)

=== Genesis chapter 29 ===
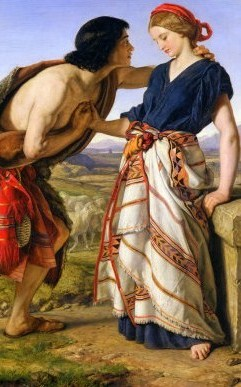
Jacob Meets Rachel at the Well (early to mid-19th-century painting by William Dyce)

The Gemara cited the words "And it came to pass" (וַיְהִי, wa-yehi) in Genesis 29:10 as an exception to the general rule taught by Rabbi Levi, or some say Rabbi Jonathan, in a tradition handed down from the Men of the Great Assembly, that wherever the Bible employs the term and it was or and it came to pass (וַיְהִי, wa-yehi) it indicates misfortune, as one can read wa-yehi as wai, hi, 'woe, sorrow.' Thus, the words, "And it came to pass when man began to multiply," in Genesis 6:1, are followed by the words, "God saw that the wickedness of man was great," in Genesis 6:5. And the Gemara also cited the instances of Genesis 11:2 followed by Genesis 11:4; Genesis 14:1 followed by Genesis 14:2; Joshua 5:13 followed by the rest of Joshua 5:13; Joshua 6:27 followed by Joshua 7:1; 1 Samuel 1:1 followed by 1 Samuel 1:5; 1 Samuel 8:1 followed by 1 Samuel 8:3; 1 Samuel 18:14 close after 1 Samuel 18:9; 2 Samuel 7:1 followed by 1 Kings 8:19; Ruth 1:1 followed by the rest of Ruth 1:1; and Esther 1:1 followed by Haman. But the Gemara also cited as counterexamples the words, "And there was evening and there was morning one day," in Genesis 1:5, as well as Genesis 29:10, and 1 Kings 6:1. So Rav Ashi replied that wa-yehi sometimes presages misfortune, and sometimes it does not, but the expression "and it came to pass in the days of" always presages misfortune. And for that proposition, the Gemara cited Genesis 14:1, Isaiah 7:1 Jeremiah 1:3, Ruth 1:1, and Esther 1:1.

Reading Genesis 29:13, "It was when Laban heard," a midrash taught that Laban thought that Abraham's servant had been among the lowest of Abraham's household, but as Genesis 24:10 reports, "The servant took ten camels." Laban thought that Jacob, who was the most beloved of the household, should all the more so. When Laban did not see even a knapsack (in the words of Genesis 29:13), "he embraced him." Laban thought that Jacob must have kept coins in his belt. When Laban found nothing (in the continuation of Genesis 29:13), "he kissed him." Laban thought that perhaps Jacob had gems in his mouth. When Laban did not see anything (in the continuation of Genesis 29:13), Jacob "related to Laban all these matters." The midrash taught that Jacob said to Laban, "What do you think, that I came bearing money? I came only bearing words."

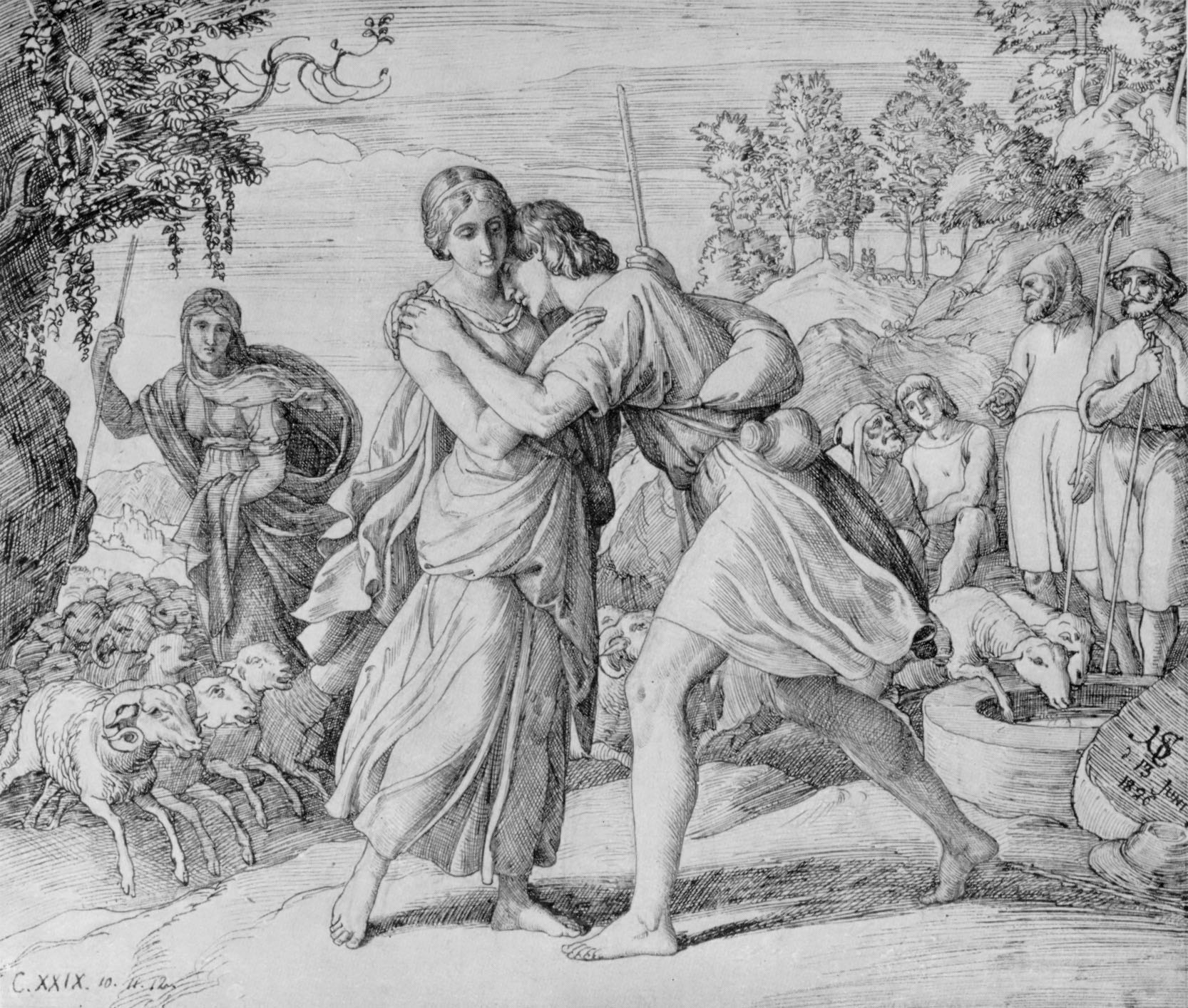
Jacob and Rachel at the Well (19th-century illustration by Julius Schnorr von Carolsfeld)

Reading Genesis 29:14, "Laban said to him: 'Indeed, you are my bone and my flesh,'" a midrash taught that Laban told Jacob that he had thought that he would treat Jacob like a king, but when Laban learned that Jacob had nothing with him, Laban told Jacob that Laban would strip Jacob bare like a bone. Rabbi Ami deduced from Genesis 29:14, "he stayed with him a month’s time," that the Torah teaches one etiquette and that a person must tend to a person's relatives up to a month.

Reading Genesis 29:15, "Laban said to Jacob: 'Because you are my brother, shall you work for me for nothing? Tell me, what is your salary?'" a midrash taught that if Jacob performed a task for ten silver coins, Laban would give him five silver coins, and if Jacob's delivery was worth six silver pieces, Laban would give him three silver pieces. But Jacob told Laban that he had not come because he wanted Laban's money, but only because of Laban's two young daughters.

The Gemara reported two interpretations of Genesis 29:17, "And Leah's eyes were weak (רַכּוֹת, rakkot)." The Gemara questioned that Scripture would so disparage Leah, when Scripture did not disparage even a non-kosher animal, as Genesis 7:8 speaks of animals "that are lacking purity" rather than disparaging those animals as "impure." Rather, Rabbi Elazar taught that the term "weak (רַכּוֹת, rakkot)" alludes to her gifts, that is, the gifts given to her descendants, for example, the priesthood and the monarchy, were long-lasting (אֲרוּכּוֹת, arukkot), as they were passed down from generation to generation. Alternatively, Rav taught that Genesis 29:17 means that her eyes were literally weak, and this was not a denigration but a praise of her. As Leah would hear people at the crossroads, coming from the land of Canaan, who would tell that Rebekah had two sons, and her brother Laban had two daughters, and would speculate that the older daughter would marry the older son, and the younger daughter would marry the younger son. And Leah would ask about the older son, and the passersby would answer that he was an evil man who robbed people. She would ask about the younger son, and the passersby would answer in the words of Genesis 25:27 that he was "a quiet man, dwelling in tents." And because Leah was so distraught at the prospect of marrying the evil brother, she would cry and pray for mercy until her eyelashes fell out. Since the weakness of her eyes was due to this cause, characterizing her eyes as weak constitutes praise.

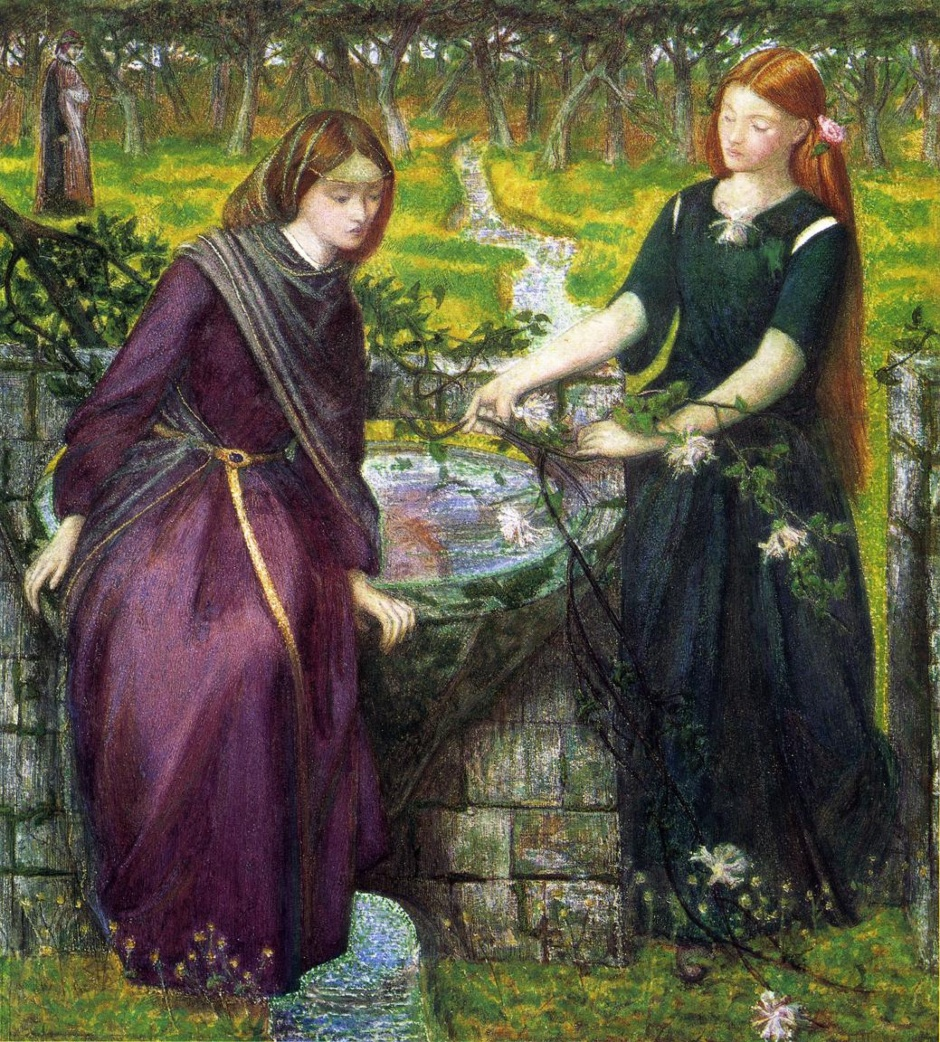
Dante's Vision of Rachel and Leah (1855 watercolor by Dante Gabriel Rossetti)

Rabbi Eleazar interpreted the words "He withdraws not his eyes from the righteous" in Job 36:7 to teach that God rewards righteousness, even generations later. The Gemara taught that in reward for Rachel's modesty as shown in her dealings with Jacob, God rewarded her with King Saul as a descendant. The Gemara taught that Jacob asked Rachel, "Will you marry me?" She replied, "Yes, but my father is a trickster, and he will outwit you." Jacob replied, "I am his brother in trickery." She said to him, "Is it permitted to the righteous to indulge in trickery?" He replied (in the words of 2 Samuel 22:27), "Yes, with the pure you show yourself pure, and with the crooked you show yourself subtle." He asked her, "What is his trickery?" She replied: "I have a sister older than I am, and he will not let me marry before her." So Jacob gave her certain tokens through which he could identify her. When night came, she said to herself, "Now my sister will be put to shame," so she gave Leah the tokens. Thus, when Genesis 29:25 reports, "And it came to pass in the morning that, behold, it was Leah," we are not to infer that up until then she had not been Leah, but rather that on account of the tokens that Rachel had given Leah, Jacob did not know until then that it was Leah. Therefore, God rewarded Rachel with having Saul among her descendants.

Similarly, a midrash taught that when the time for Jacob and Rachel’s marriage arrived, Laban plotted to exchange Rachel with Leah. When Rachel became aware of the plot, the matter was extremely difficult for her, and she told Jacob and gave him a signal to distinguish between the sisters so that Laban would not be able to exchange them. Afterward, Rachel regretted what she had done and had mercy on Leah, so that Leah would not be led to humiliation. In the evening they exchanged the sisters, and Rachel transmitted to Leah all the signals that she had given to Jacob, so that he would think that Leah was Rachel. Rachel then hid beneath the bed on which Jacob was lying with Leah. He would speak with Leah and she would be silent, and Rachel would respond to everything that he said, so that he would not identify Leah’s voice.

Rabbi Haggai said in Rabbi Isaac's name that all of the Matriarchs were prophets.

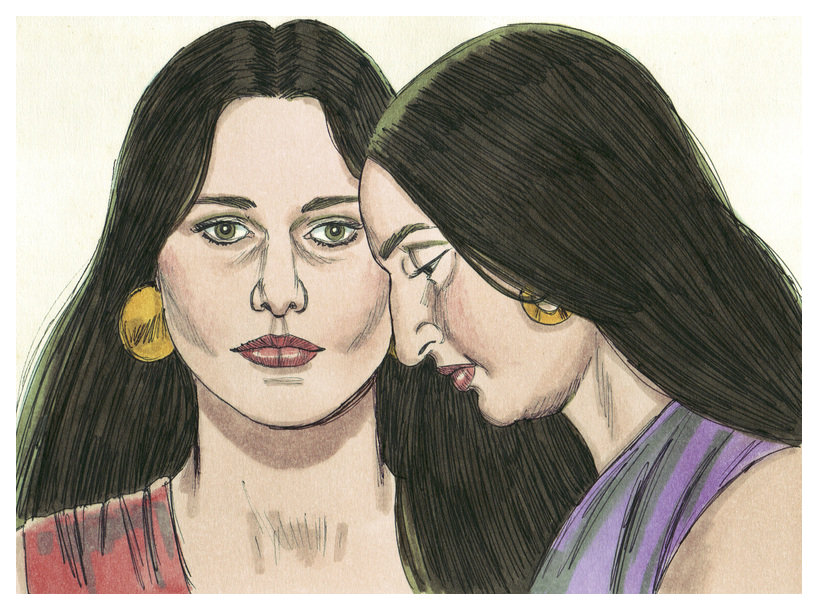
Rachel and Leah (1984 illustration by Jim Padgett, courtesy of Distant Shores Media/Sweet Publishing)

The seven days of Jacob's wedding feast in Genesis 29:27–28 are reflected in the Sages' ruling that if a groom developed symptoms of skin disease (tzaraat) they granted him a delay of inspection to the end of the seven days of his marriage feast.

The Pesikta de-Rav Kahana taught that Leah and Rachel were two of seven barren women about whom Psalm 113:9 says (speaking of God), "He . . . makes the barren woman to dwell in her house as a joyful mother of children." The Pesikta de-Rav Kahana also listed Sarah, Rebekah, Manoah's wife, Hannah, and Zion. The Pesikta de-Rav Kahana taught that the words of Psalm 113:9, "He . . . makes the barren woman to dwell in her house," apply to Leah, for Genesis 29:31 reports: "And the Lord saw that Leah was hated, and he opened her womb," implying that she had previously been barren. And the words of Psalm 113:9, "a joyful mother of children," apply to Leah, as well, for Genesis 30:20 reports that Leah said, "I have borne him six sons." The Pesikta de-Rav Kahana taught that the words of Psalm 113:9, "He . . . makes the barren woman to dwell in her house," apply to Rachel, for Genesis 29:31 reports: "Rachel was barren." And the words of Psalm 113:9, "a joyful mother of children," apply to Rachel, as well, for Genesis 35:24 reports, "the sons of Rachel: Joseph and Benjamin."

Rabbi Elazar taught that when in Genesis 29:31 Leah named her son Reuben, she said prophetically: "See (ראו, re'u) the difference between my son (בֵּן, ben) and Isaac's son Esau. Even though Esau knowingly sold his birthright to his brother Jacob, as Genesis 25:33 says, "And he sold his birthright to Jacob," Genesis 27:41 nonetheless reports, "Esau hated Jacob." But even though Joseph took Reuben's birthright (as 1 Chronicles 5:1 reports), Reuben was not jealous of Joseph, and when Joseph's brothers sought to kill Joseph, Genesis 37:21 reports, "Reuben heard and he saved him from their hands, saying 'Let us not take his life.'"

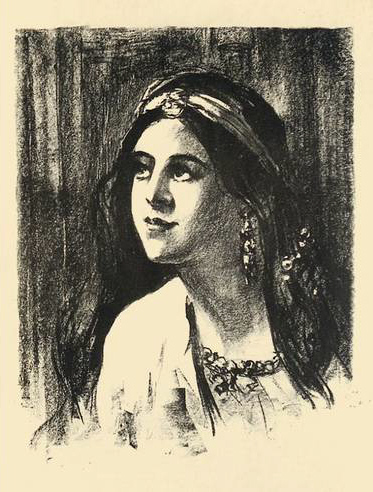
Rachel (1920 lithograph from the collection Biblische Gestalten (Biblical Figures) published by Fritz Gurlitt)

Rabbi Joḥanan said in the name of Rabbi Shimon ben Yoḥai that Genesis 29:35 showed that from the day that God created the world, no man praised God until Leah did upon the birth of Judah.

=== Genesis chapter 30 ===
It was taught in a Baraita that four types of people are accounted as though they were dead: a poor person, a person affected by skin disease (מְּצֹרָע, metzora), a blind person, and one who is childless. A poor person is accounted as dead, for Exodus 4:19 says, "for all the men are dead who sought your life" (and the Gemara interpreted this to mean that they had been stricken with poverty). A person affected by skin disease (מְּצֹרָע, metzora) is accounted as dead, for Numbers 12:10–12 says, "And Aaron looked upon Miriam, and behold, she was leprous (מְצֹרָעַת, metzora'at). And Aaron said to Moses . . . let her not be as one dead." The blind are accounted as dead, for Lamentations 3:6 says, "He has set me in dark places, as they that be dead of old." And one who is childless is accounted as dead, for in Genesis 30:1, Rachel said, "Give me children, or else I am dead."

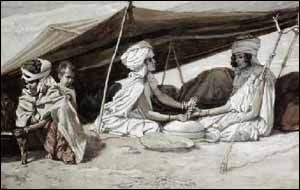
Rachel and Leah (watercolor circa 1896–1902 by James Tissot)

Rabbi Simeon taught that because Rachel treated the righteous Jacob so slightingly (as to trade away sleeping with him for some mandrakes, as reported in Genesis 30:14–15) she was not buried with him. Thus, in Genesis 30:15 Rachel said (in unwitting prophecy) "Therefore, he [Jacob] shall lie with you [Leah]," hinting that Jacob would lie with Leah in death, and not with Rachel. Rabbi Berekiah taught that Rabbi Eleazar and Rabbi Samuel ben Naḥman commented on this. Rabbi Eleazar said that each wife lost (by the transaction) and each gained. Leah lost the mandrakes and gained the tribes (of Issachar and Zebulun) while Rachel gained the mandrakes and lost the tribes (of Issachar and Zebulun). (And some say Leah lost the birthright and Rachel gained the birthright. The birthright belonged to Reuben, but as a punishment for Reuben's causing this transaction, the birthright was taken from him and given to Joseph.) Rabbi Samuel ben Naḥman said that Leah lost mandrakes and gained (two) tribes and the privilege of burial with Jacob, while Rachel gained mandrakes and lost the tribes and burial with Jacob.

Alluding to Genesis 30:16, Rabbi Samuel bar Naḥman said in the name of Rabbi Jonathan that when a wife summons a husband to his marital duty, they will have children such as were not to be found even in the generation of Moses. For regarding the generation of Moses, Deuteronomy 1:13 says, "Take wise men, and understanding and known among your tribes, and I will make them rulers over you." But Deuteronomy 1:15 says, "So I took the chiefs of your tribes, wise men and known," without mentioning "understanding" (implying that Moses could not find men with understanding). And Genesis 49:14 says, "Issachar is a large-boned donkey" (alluding to the midrash that Leah heard Jacob's donkey, and so came out of her tent to summon Jacob to his marital duty, as reported in Genesis 30:16). And 1 Chronicles 12:32 says, "of the children of Issachar . . . were men who had understanding of the times to know what Israel ought to do." But the Gemara limited the teaching of Rabbi Samuel bar Naḥman in the name of Rabbi Jonathan by counseling that such behavior is virtuous only when the wife ingratiates herself to her husband without making brazen demands.

Rabbi Joḥanan taught that the words "and he lay with her that night" in Genesis 30:16, in which the word הוּא, hu ("He") appears in an unusual locution, indicate that God assisted in causing Issachar's conception. Rabbi Joḥanan found in the words "Issachar is a large-boned donkey" in Genesis 49:14 an indication that Jacob's donkey detoured to Leah's tent, helping to cause Issachar's birth.

Rebbi (or some say Rabbi Judah ben Pazi) said in the name of the academy of Yannai that Dinah was originally conceived as a boy, but when Rachel prayed for another son in Genesis 30:24, God transformed Dinah's fetus into a girl, and that is why the description of Dinah's birth in Genesis 30:21 uses the word "afterward," showing that this happened after Rachel prayed. And Rav taught that the word "afterward" in Genesis 30:21 signified that Leah bore Dinah "after" she passed judgment on herself, reasoning that twelve tribes were destined to issue from Jacob and six had already issued from her and four from the handmaids, and if the child of the current pregnancy were to be a boy, then Rachel would not have as many sons as one of the handmaids. Thereupon the child was turned into a girl, and Dinah was born.

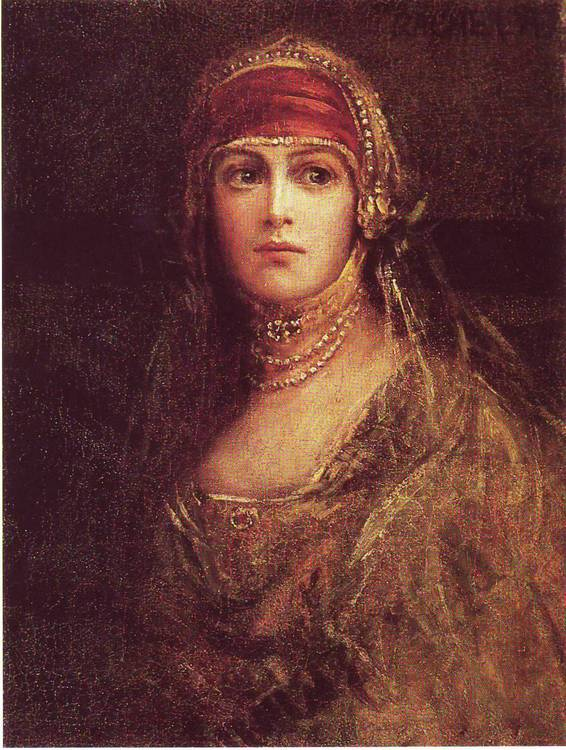
Rachela (19th-century painting by Maurycy Gottlieb)

A Baraita taught that on Rosh Hashanah, God remembered each of Sarah, Rachel, and Hannah and decreed that they would bear children. Rabbi Eliezer found support for the Baraita from the parallel use of the word "remember" in Genesis 30:22, which says about Rachel, "And God remembered Rachel," and in Leviticus 23:24, which calls Rosh Hashanah "a remembrance of the blast of the trumpet."

A midrash taught that the words of Psalm 98:3, "He has remembered His mercy and His faithfulness toward the house of Israel," allude to the report of Genesis 30:22, "And God remembered Rachel, and God hearkened to her."

Rabbi Judan said in Rabbi Aibu's name that Rachel was remembered through many prayers. First, for her own sake, as Genesis 30:22 says, "And God remembered Rachel (אֶת-רָחֵל, et-Rachel)," and אֶת-רָחֵל, et-Rachel, implies for the sake of her sister (as אֶת, et, is often interpreted as an extending particle, adding instances or cases not explicitly mentioned). "And God hearkened to her" for Jacob's sake; "and opened her womb" for the sake of the matriarchs.

A midrash taught that when Genesis 30:22 says, "And God remembered Rachel," it reports that God remember in her favor her silence on her sister Leah's behalf, for when Leah was being given to Jacob, Rachel knew it, yet was silent. For the Gemara taught (as recounted at greater length above) that when Jacob asked Rachel to marry him, Jacob entrusted Rachel with certain signs by which he might know her in the dark. While Leah was being led into the bridal chamber, Rachel realized that Leah would be disgraced, so Rachel gave Leah the signs. And thus because of what Rachel did, Jacob did not know that it was Leah until the morning.

A midrash taught that it was only just that "God remembered Rachel," because Rachel had allowed her rival Bilhah into her home. Rav Huna and Rabbi Aha in Rabbi Simon's name quoted 1 Chronicles 2:2: "Dan, Joseph, and Benjamin," and taught that for the sake of Dan, Rachel was remembered; for the sake of Dan, Joseph and Benjamin were born (as a reward for Rachel's giving her rival Bilhah to Jacob, from whom was born Dan).

Rabbi Joḥanan taught that God holds three keys that God does not entrust to any messenger: the key of rain, the key of childbirth, and the key of the revival of the dead. The Gemara cited Genesis 30:22 to support the proposition that God holds the key of childbirth, as the verse says, "And God remembered Rachel, and God hearkened to her, and opened her womb." And the Gemara noted that Scripture uses the verb "bear" with regard to both childbirth, in Genesis 30:23, "she conceived, and bore a son," and rain, in Isaiah 55:10, "the rain comes down and the snow from heaven, and returns not there, but waters the earth, and makes it bear and bud." Rabbi Akiva read the words "God . . . opened her womb" in Genesis 30:22 to support the proposition that just as there is key to a house, there is a key to a woman's fertility.

Rabbi Judah ben Pazi said in the name of the academy of Rabbi Yannai that Rachel showed that she was a prophetess when in Genesis 30:24 she prophesied that she would bear another son, and by using the singular "son" she foretold that Jacob would have just one more son.

Rabbi Samuel ben Naḥman, citing Rabbi Joḥanan, noted that 1 Chronicles 12:33 reports that "the children of Issachar . . . had understanding." Rabbi Samuel bar Naḥman noted that Genesis 30:27 reports that Jacob and Leah conceived Issachar after "Leah went out to meet him, and said: ‘You must come to me, for I have surely hired you.'" In contrast, Rabbi Samuel bar Naḥman noted that in Deuteronomy 1:13, God told Moses, "Get you from each one of your tribes, wise men and understanding, and full of knowledge," but in Deuteronomy 1:15, Moses reported, "So I took the heads of your tribes, wise men and full of knowledge," and Rabbi Samuel bar Naḥman thus deduced that Moses could not find men of "understanding" in his generation. Rabbi Samuel bar Naḥman concluded that a woman who solicits her husband to perform the marital obligation, as Leah did, will have children the like of whom did not exist even in the generation of Moses.

The Tosefta deduced from Genesis 30:30 that before Jacob arrived, Laban's house had not received a blessing, and deduced from Genesis 30:27 that it was because of Jacob's arrival that Laban was blessed thereafter.

Rabbi Judah the son of Rabbi Simon in the name of Hezekiah employed the meaning of the pilgrim's recitation in Deuteronomy 26:5 to help interpret Jacob's statement to Laban in Genesis 30:30. Rabbi Judah the son of Rabbi Simon noted that the word little or few (מְעָט, me'at) appears both in Jacob's statement to Laban in Genesis 30:30, "For it was little (מְעָט, me'at) that you had before I came, and it has increased abundantly," and also in the pilgrim's recitation in Deuteronomy 26:5, "few (מְעָט, me'at) in number" (went down to Egypt). Rabbi Judah the son of Rabbi Simon said in the name of Hezekiah that just as in Deuteronomy 26:5, few (מְעָט, me'at) means 70 (people), so in Genesis 30:30, little (מְעָט, me'at) must also mean 70 (head of cattle and sheep).

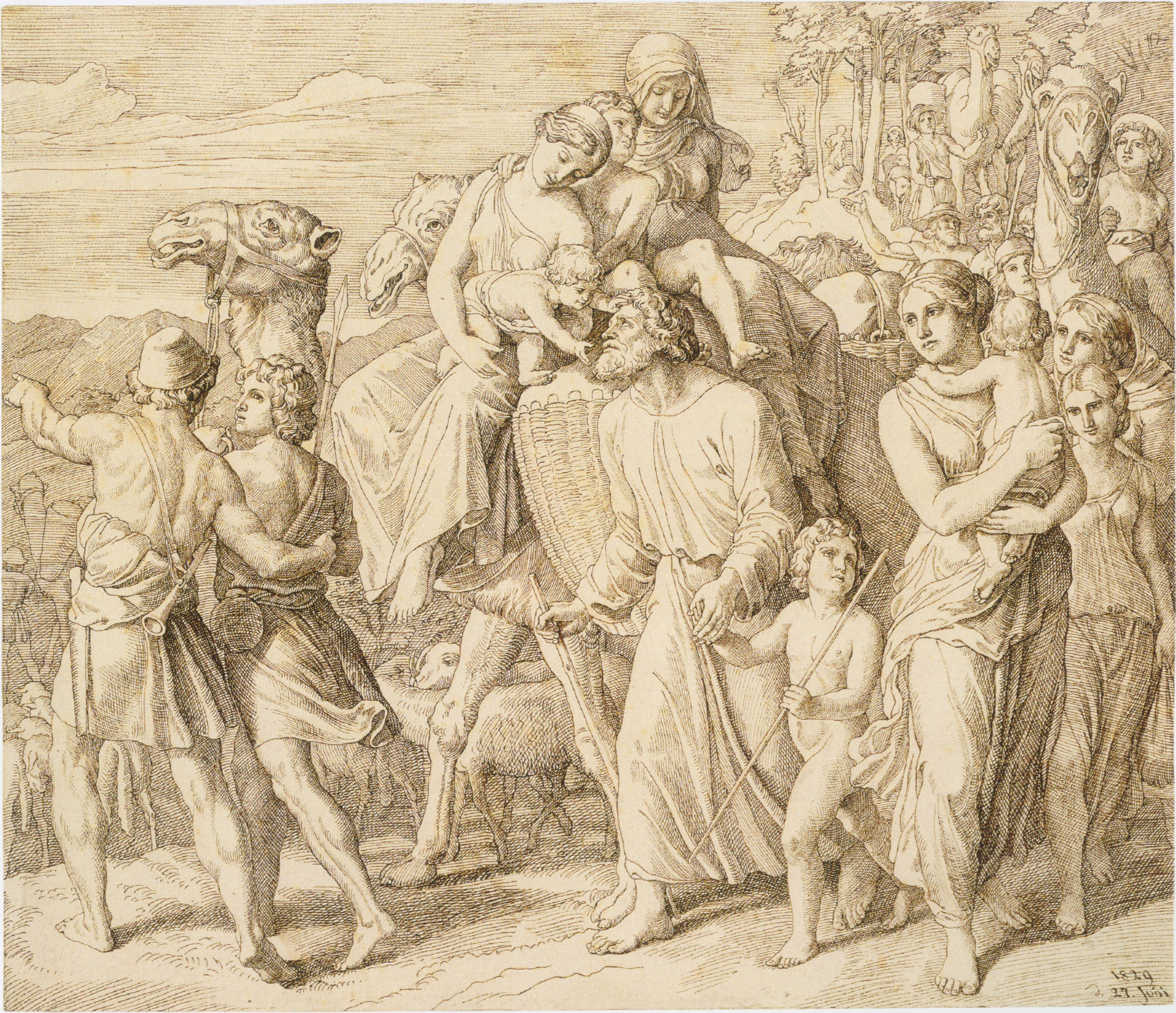
Jacob's Flight (1829 illustration by Julius Schnorr von Carolsfeld)

=== Genesis chapter 31 ===
It was taught in a Baraita that Rabbi Akiva said that one of three things that he liked about the Medes was that when they held counsel, they did so only in the field. Rav Adda bar Ahabah said that Genesis 31:4, where Jacob called Rachel and Leah to the field, could be cited in support of the practice.

In Genesis 31:20, the heart can be stolen. A midrash catalogued the wide range of additional capabilities of the heart reported in the Hebrew Bible. The heart speaks, sees, hears, walks, falls, stands, rejoices, cries, is comforted, is troubled, becomes hardened, grows faint, grieves, fears, can be broken, becomes proud, rebels, invents, cavils, overflows, devises, desires, goes astray, lusts, is refreshed, is humbled, is enticed, errs, trembles, is awakened, loves, hates, envies, is searched, is rent, meditates, is like a fire, is like a stone, turns in repentance, becomes hot, dies, melts, takes in words, is susceptible to fear, gives thanks, covets, becomes hard, makes merry, acts deceitfully, speaks from out of itself, loves bribes, writes words, plans, receives commandments, acts with pride, makes arrangements, and aggrandizes itself.

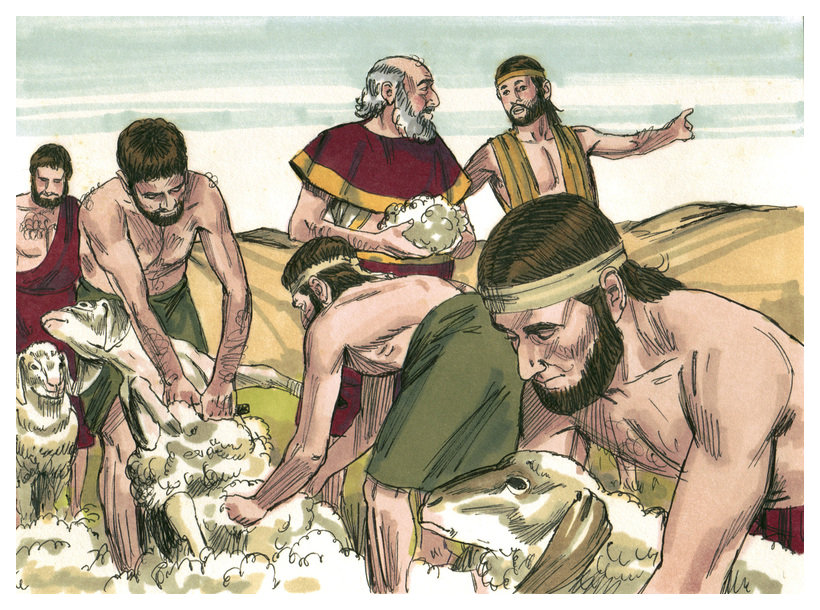
Laban found out that Jacob had left. (1984 illustration by Jim Padgett, courtesy of Distant Shores Media/Sweet Publishing)

The Rabbis taught that God appears to non-Jews only in dreams, as God appeared to Laban the "in a dream of the night" in Genesis 31:24, God appeared to Abimelech "in a dream of the night" in Genesis 20:3, and God appeared to Balaam "at night" in Numbers 22:20. The Rabbis taught that God thus appeared more openly to the prophets of Israel than to those of other nations. The Rabbis compared God's action to those of a king who has both a wife and a concubine; to his wife he goes openly, but to his concubine he goes stealthily. And a midrash taught that God's appearance to Laban in Genesis 31:24 and God's appearance to Abimelech in Genesis 20:3 were the two instances where the Pure and Holy One allowed God's self to be associated with impure (idolatrous) people, on behalf of righteous ones.

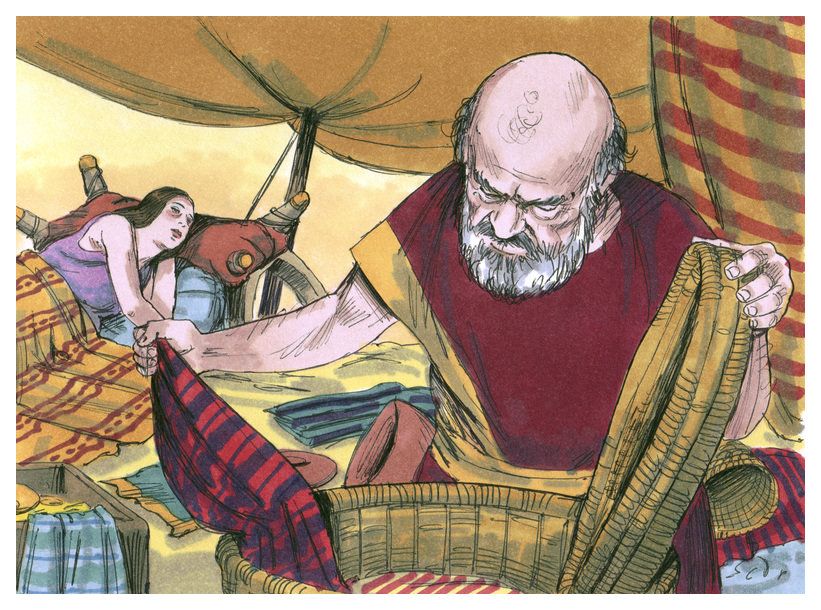
Laban searched through all the tents. (1984 illustration by Jim Padgett, courtesy of Distant Shores Media/Sweet Publishing)

Similarly, a midrash cited Genesis 31:24 as an application of the principle that all miracles that God did for Israel, and the punishment of the wicked on their behalf, took place at night. To this end, the midrash cited Genesis 14:15, "And he divided himself against them by night"; Genesis 20:3, "But God came to Abimelech in a dream of the night"; Genesis 31:24, "And God came to Laban the Aramean in a dream of the night"; Exodus 7:42, "It was a night of watching unto the Lord . . . this same night"; Exodus 12:29, "And it came to pass at midnight"; Exodus 14:20, "And there was the cloud and the darkness here, yet gave it light by night there"; and Numbers 22:20, "And God came to Balaam at night."

A midrash taught that the words of Genesis 31:24, "And God came to Laban the Aramean in a dream of the night," indicated God's distance from Laban. Rabbi Leazar taught that the words of Proverbs 15:29, "The Lord is far from the wicked," refer to the prophets of other nations. But the continuation of Proverbs 15:29, "He hears the prayer of the righteous," refers to the prophets of Israel. God appears to nations other that Israel only as one who comes from a distance, as Isaiah 39:3 says, "They came from a far country to me." But in connection with the prophets of Israel, Genesis 18:1 says, "And the Lord appeared," and Leviticus 1:1 says, "And the Lord called," implying from the immediate vicinity. Rabbi Ḥaninah compared the difference between the prophets of Israel and the prophets of other nations to a king who was with his friend in a chamber (separated by a curtain). Whenever the king desired to speak to his friend, he folded up the curtain and spoke to him. (But God speaks to the prophets of other nations without folding back the curtain.) The Rabbis compared it to a king who has a wife and a concubine; to his wife he goes openly, but to his concubine he repairs with stealth. Similarly, God appears to non-Jews only at night, as Numbers 22:20 says, "And God came to Balaam at night," and Genesis 31:24 says, "And God came to Laban the Aramean in a dream of the night."

The Pirke De-Rabbi Eliezer taught that Laban took all the men of his city, mighty men, and pursued after Jacob, seeking to slay him. Then the angel Michael descended, and drew his sword behind Laban, seeking to slay him. Michael told Laban (as reported in Genesis 31:24): "Do not speak to Jacob, either good or bad."

Rabbi Joḥanan taught in the name of Rabbi Simeon ben Yoḥai that all the favors that the wicked do for the righteous are in fact evil for the righteous. For in Genesis 31:24, God told Laban, "Take heed to yourself that you speak not to Jacob either good or evil." Rabbi Joḥanan observed that one can understand why God would direct Laban not to speak evil to Jacob, but asked why God would direct him not to say anything good. From here Rabbi Joḥanan inferred that even if Laban had tried to speak good to Jacob, it would have resulted in bad for Jacob.

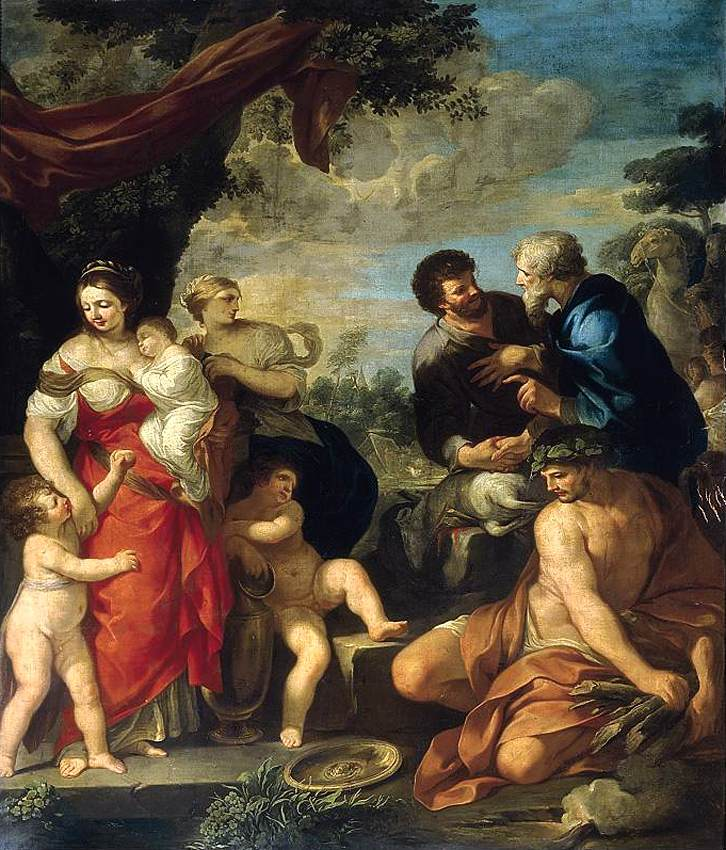
The Reconciliation of Jacob and Laban (17th-century painting by Ciro Ferri)

Rabbi Aibu taught that when Laban's grandchildren heard Laban ask in Genesis 31:32, "Why have you stolen my gods?" they exclaimed that they were ashamed that in his old age their grandfather could say that these idols were his gods.

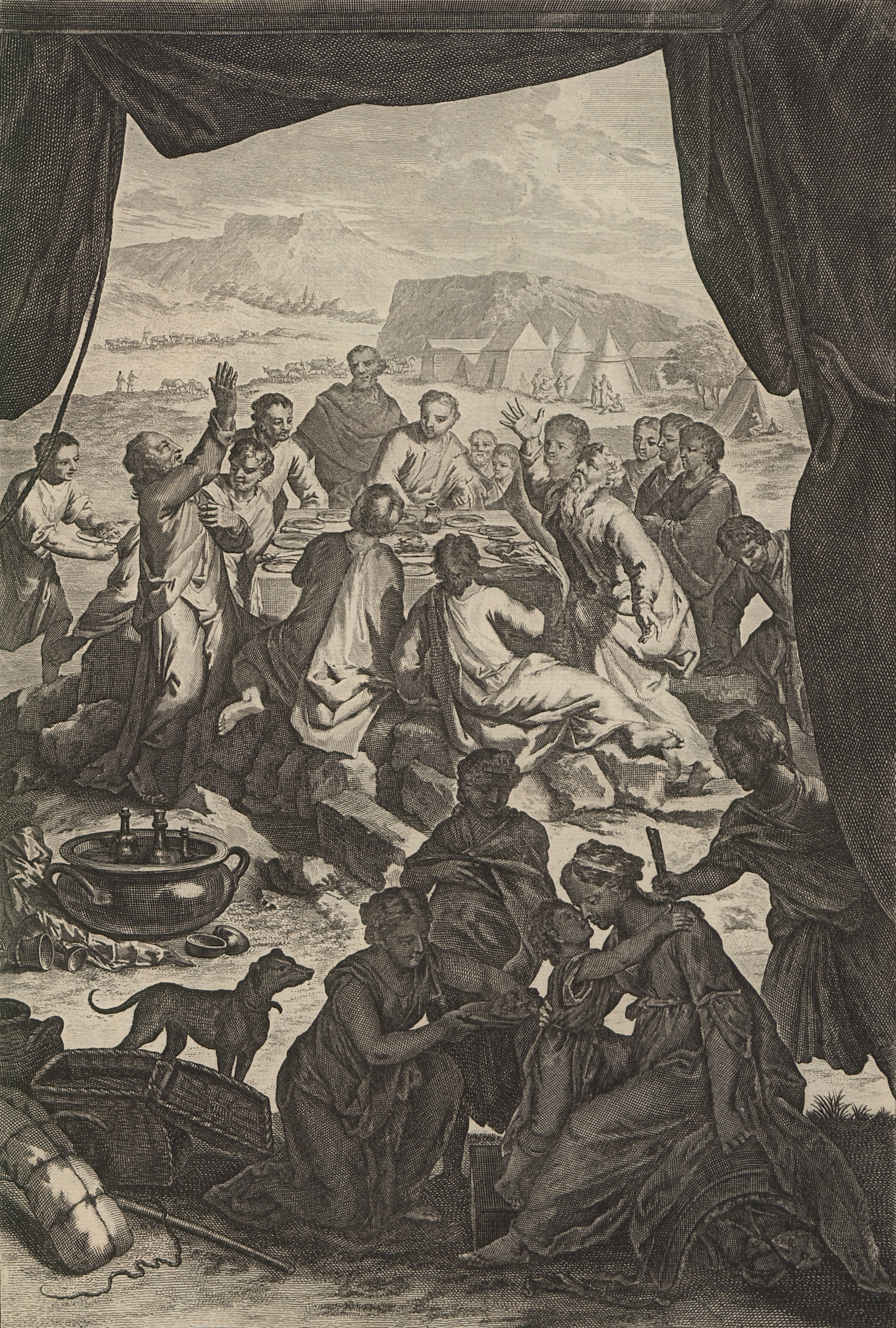
Laban and Jacob Make a Covenant Together (illustration from the 1728 Figures de la Bible)

A midrash taught that Rachel's death ensued because Jacob told Laban in Genesis 31:32, "With whomever you find your gods, he shall not live." The midrash thus taught that Jacob's words were (in the words of Ecclesiastes 10:5) "like an error that proceeds from a ruler."

Rabbi Berekiah in Rabbi Levi's name may have drawn on Genesis 31:40–42 for the proposition that Laban tried to destroy Jacob. Rabbi Berekiah in Rabbi Levi's name read Job 29:13 to say, "The blessing of the destroyer (אֹבֵד, oved) came upon me," and interpreted "The blessing of the destroyer (אֹבֵד, oved)" to allude to Laban the Syrian. Rabbi Berekiah in Rabbi Levi's name thus read Deuteronomy 26:5 to say, "An Aramean (Laban) sought to destroy (אֹבֵד, oved) my father (Jacob)." (Thus, Laban sought to destroy Jacob by, perhaps among other things, cheating Jacob out of payment for his work, as Jacob recounted in Genesis 31:40–42. This interpretation thus reads אֹבֵד, oved, as a transitive verb.) Rabbi Berekiah and Rabbi Levi in the name of Rabbi Hama ben Ḥaninah thus explained that Rebekah was remembered with the blessing of children only after Isaac prayed for her, so that the heathens in Rebekah's family might not say that their prayer in Genesis 24:60 caused that result. Rather, God answered Isaac's prayer, as Genesis 25:21 reports, "And Isaac entreated the Lord for his wife . . . and his wife Rebekah conceived."

The Gemara interpreted the words of Genesis 31:50, "If you shall afflict my daughters, and if you shall take wives beside my daughters," to mean that Jacob forswore two kinds of affliction. The Gemara read "if you shall afflict" to mean by denying conjugal duty, and the Gemara read "if you shall take" to refer to marrying rival wives. Thus the Gemara deduced that abstention from marital intercourse is considered an affliction.

=== Genesis chapter 32 ===
Rav taught that Jacob's merit saved later Israelites. 2 Samuel 24:1–16 reports that after King David ordered a census of the Israelites, God punished the Israelites with a plague. 1 Chronicles 21:15 then reports, "And as He was about to destroy, the Lord beheld, and He repented Him." The Gemara asked what God beheld that caused God to withhold destruction. Rav taught that God beheld (the merit of) Jacob, as Genesis 32:3 says, "And Jacob said when he beheld them (the angels that would protect Israel): 'This is God's camp.'"

== In modern interpretation ==
The parashah is discussed in these modern sources:

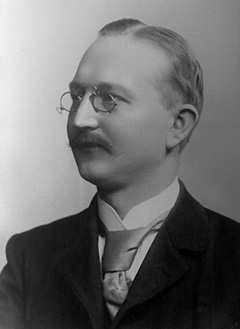
Gunkel

=== Genesis chapters 25–33 ===
Hermann Gunkel wrote that the legend cycle of Jacob-Esau-Laban divided clearly into the legends (1) of Jacob and Esau (Genesis 25:19–34; 27:1–45; 27:46–28:9; 32:3–21; 33:1–17), (2) of Jacob and Laban (Genesis 29:1–30; 30:25–31:55), (3) of the origin of the twelve tribes (Genesis 29:31–30:24), and (4) of the origin of ritual observances (Genesis 28:10–22; 32:1–2, 22–32).

Michael Fishbane identified the following chiastic structure in the Jacob cycle in Genesis 25–35:

A: Genealogy (toledot) (Genesis 25:19)

B: Oracle sought; Rebekah struggles in childbirth; birthright (bekhorah); birth; themes of strife, deception, and fertility (Genesis 25:19–34)

C: Interlude; strife, deception; blessing (berakhah); covenant with foreigner (Genesis 26)

D: Deception; blessing (berakhah) stolen; fear of Esau; flight from land (Genesis 27:1–28:9);

E: Encounter (paga) with the divine at sacred site, near border; blessing (berakhah) (Genesis 28:10–22)

F: Internal cycle opens; arrival; Laban at border; deception; wages (Genesis 29)

G: Rachel barren; Leah fertile (Genesis 30:1–21)

H: Rachel fertile (Genesis 30:22–24)

G^{1}: Jacob increases the herds (Genesis 30:25–43)

F^{1}: Internal cycle closes; departure; Laban at border; deception; wages (Genesis 31)

E^{1}: Encounters (paga) with divine beings at sacred sites, near border; blessing (berakhah) (Genesis 32)

D^{1}: Deception planned; fear of Esau; blessing (berakhah) returned; return to land (Genesis 33)

C^{1}: Interlude; strife, deception; covenant with foreigner (Genesis 34)

B^{1}: Oracle fulfilled; Rachel struggles in childbirth; blessing (berakhah); death, resolutions (Genesis 35:1–22)

A^{1}: Genealogies (toledot) (Genesis 35:22–36:5)

Walter Brueggemann suggested a similar chiastic structure to the Jacob narrative (shown in the chart below), moving from conflict with Esau to reconciliation with Esau. Within that is conflict with Laban moving to covenant with Laban. And within that, at the center, is the narrative of births, in which the birth of Joseph (at Genesis 30:24) marks the turning point in the entire narrative, after which Jacob looks toward the Land of Israel and his brother Esau. Amid the conflicts are the two major encounters with God, which occur at crucial times in the sequence of conflicts.

The Jacob Narrative
Conflict with Esau						Reconciliation with Esau
25:19–34; 27:1–45; 27:46–28:9						32–33:17
	Meeting at Bethel				Meeting at Penu'el	
	28:10–22				32–33:17	
		Conflict with Laban		Covenant with Laban		
		29:1–30		30:25–31:55		
			Births			
			29:31–30:24			

Acknowledging that some interpreters view Jacob's two encounters with God in Genesis 28:10–22 and 32–33:17 as parallel, Terence Fretheim argued that one may see more significant levels of correspondence between the two Bethel stories in Genesis 28:10–22 and 35:1–15, and one may view the oracle to Rebekah in Genesis 29:23 regarding "struggling" as parallel to Jacob's struggle at the Jabbok in Genesis 32–33:17. Fretheim concluded that these four instances of Divine speaking link to each other in complex ways.

Israel Finkelstein and Neil Asher Silberman argue that the stories about Jacob and Laban metaphorically express the complex and stormy relations between the nations of Aram and Israel over many centuries.

Cynthia Chapman suggested that Judeans compiled and edited the ancestor narratives in Genesis after the Babylonian captivity to serve as stories of national origin. Chapman noted that several recurring themes of the Patriarchal narratives spoke to the exilic reality of those who preserved the stories. These stories emphasize God's presence and power transcending national boundaries, the special covenant between God and Abraham's descendants, the eternal nature of their covenant relationship, and the everlasting gift of the Promised Land. The stories also acknowledge tensions that threaten the protagonists. Jacob spent most of his adult life in Mesopotamia, and stories of hard-won children who were born into a land inheritance spoke powerfully to an exilic community that had lost many children to war and sickness during the long journey to exile. The Israelites viewed their world as a family tree; the story of Jacob's family became the basis for how the Israelites understood themselves socially and politically as an alliance of 12 tribes; and where tribes stood in relation to each other. The process by which Jacob became Israel involved fleeing, exile, and hard labor. From the perspective of a people exiled from their land living in Mesopotamia, Jacob's story was a powerful story of redemption. The Tribe of Judah also endured hard labor, took wives and had children, replenishing themselves into something resembling a nation. Many would build wealth in exile, and when they returned during the Persian period, they returned not as Judah, but as Israel, renamed before they crossed the Jordan River back into the Promised Land.

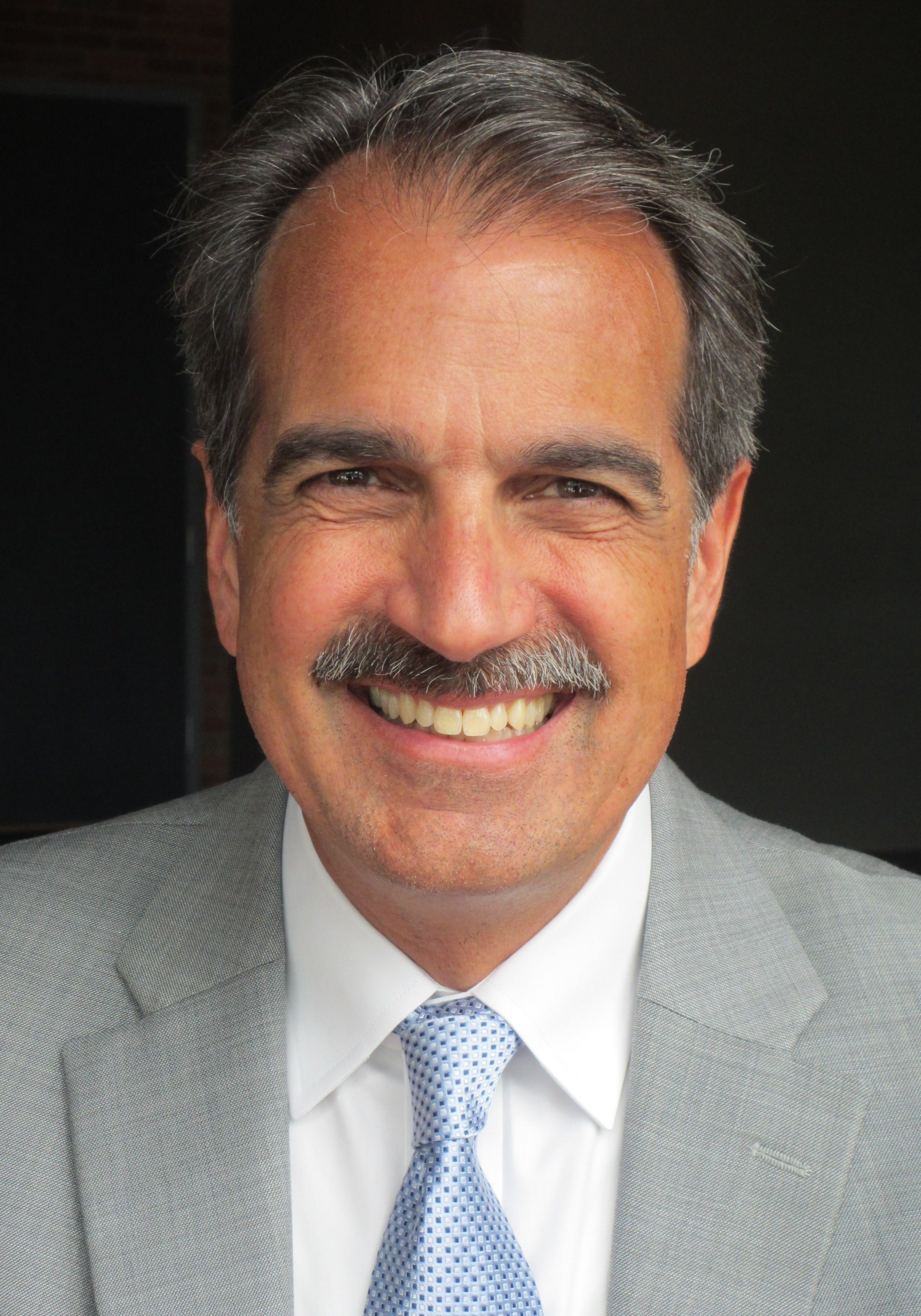
Rendsburg

=== Genesis chapter 28 ===
Gary Rendsburg suggested that Jacob's dream of a stairway to heaven in Genesis 28:12–17 was most likely of a ziggurat and that it was no coincidence that as Jacob readied to leave the land of Israel, he dreamt of something Mesopotamian.

Ephraim Speiser saw in Genesis 28:12–17 two accounts about Jacob's first stay at Bethel that were blended into a single sequence. Genesis 28:12 and 17 use the Divine name Elohim (אֱלֹהִים), while Genesis 28:13 and 16 use the Tetragrammaton (יְהוָה). Speiser argued that taken as a unit, the fused version is repetitious, but separately, each strand represents an independent tradition. Speiser thus cited Genesis 28:12–17 as an instance when the Tetragrammaton and Elohim occur in otherwise duplicate narratives, and the presence of the Priestly source is ruled out on other grounds, evincing the probability that the passages with Elohim point to a source that is neither the Jahwist nor the Priestly source, and thus evidently the Elohist. Similarly, Speiser saw further evidence in the doublet of Genesis 30:25–43, where Jacob's wealth is attributed to his own shrewdness, but Jacob refers to the Tetragrammaton, while the next account in Genesis 31:9 and 11 credits Jacob's success to the advice of an angel of God—called Elohim—who conveyed it to Jacob in a dream.

Brueggemann noted that Genesis 28:13–14 reflects the standard promise to the Patriarchs, but in Genesis 28:15, God addressed a promise peculiarly to Jacob. Brueggemann identified three parts to the promise: (1) "I am with you." In a central thrust of Biblical faith, God commits to accompany the empty-handed fugitive in places of threat. (2) "I will keep you." Like a shepherd, the Keeper of Israel guarantees the lives of those who are exposed and defenseless. (3) The promise of homecoming. Brueggemann argued that Genesis 31–33 makes clear that God does watch over God's promise and bring it to fulfillment.

John Kselman noted that God concluded God's promise to Jacob in Genesis 28:14 with the blessing that will come upon the nations of the world through contact with Jacob and his descendants. Kselman saw the beginning of the accomplishment of this promise in the story of Laban's prosperity through association with Jacob in Genesis 30:27–30.

Kselman suggested that the original function of the story of Jacob's dream in Genesis 28:10–22 and the naming of the place Bethel in Genesis 28:19 was to explain the founding of the sanctuary at Bethel, an important Northern site of worship after the succession of the Northern Tribes from the United Monarchy. Kselman argued that in designating Bethel as the site for one of the Northern temples, the new Northern Kingdom reached back before the "innovation" of Solomon's Temple in Jerusalem to a site sacred to the ancestors.

Sandra Gravett, Karla Bohmbach, Franz Greifenhagen, and Donald Polaski reported that some scholars suggested that a scribe copying an earlier text may have added Genesis 28:19, "And he called the name of that place Beth-el, but the name of the city was Luz at the first," seeking to explain the location and history of the site.

=== Genesis chapter 29 ===
Nahum Sarna reported that modern scholars deduce from the Genesis listings of Jacob's sons the evolution of the league of Israelite tribes. These scholars deduce from the listing of Reuben, Simeon, Levi, and Judah as Leah tribes that they were politically related. As their tribal territories were not contiguous, their organizing principle could not have been geographical, and their association must therefore reflect a presettlement reality. These scholars conclude that the six Leah tribes must have originated as a separate fraternity in Mesopotamia that evolved in two distinct stages. The account of the birth of Jacob's sons in Genesis 29:31–35:18 preserves the earliest traditions. The position of Judah as the fourth son reflects the situation prior to Judah's ascendancy, reflected in Genesis 49:8–12. The handmaid tribes had a subordinate status. And the tribe of Benjamin was the last to join the Israelite league and came into being in Canaan.

=== Genesis chapter 32 ===
Kselman noted that Laban pointedly did not kiss Jacob good-bye in Genesis 32:1.

== Commandments ==
According to Maimonides and Sefer ha-Chinuch, there are no commandments in the parashah.

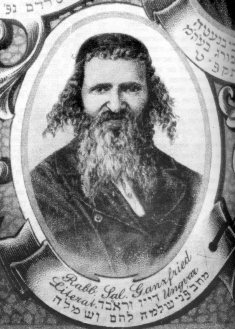
Shlomo Ganzfried, editor of the Kitzur Shulchan Aruch

The Kitzur Shulchan Aruch told how some Jews emulate Jacob's action in Genesis 28:11 by sleeping with a stone under their head on Tisha B'Av, the annual fast day to commemorate the destruction of the Temple in Jerusalem. The Kitzur Shulchan Aruch taught that on Tisha B'Av, people should make themselves uncomfortable when they go to bed at night. If they are used to sleeping with two pillows, on Tisha B'Av, they should sleep on one. The Kitzur Shulchan Aruch reported that some thus have the custom on the night of Tisha B'Av of sleeping on the ground with a stone under their head as a reminder of what Genesis 28:11 says of Jacob: "He took from the stones of the place." The Kitzur Shulchan Aruch told that on that night, Jacob had a vision of the destruction of the Temple and said (in the words of Genesis 28:17), "How awesome is this place."

The Kitzur Shulchan Aruch taught that it is forbidden to hold two weddings for two siblings on the same day, because one should not mix one celebration with another celebration. And the Kitzur Shulchan Aruch reported that some authorities taught that one should not hold two weddings for two siblings in the same week, because Genesis 29:27–28, speaks of Jacob fulfilling "the week" of the newlywed Leah before marrying her sister Rachel.

Based on Jacob's words in Genesis 31:6, the Kitzur Shulchan Aruch taught that just as an employer is enjoined not to steal a poor worker's wages nor pay them late, a worker is warned not to neglect the employer's work, and is obliged to work with all the worker's might, as Jacob said of his working for Laban in Genesis 31:6, "with all my power I have served your father." Therefore, workers are not allowed to work at night and then hire themselves out during the day, because they will already be weak from their night work. Similarly, the Kitzur Shulchan Aruch taught that one is not allowed to work one's animal by night and then hire it out during the day. And workers are not allowed to starve or stint themselves, because this weakens their strength so that they will not be able to do their work properly.

== In the liturgy ==
The Passover Haggadah, in the concluding nirtzah section of the Seder, in a reference to Genesis 31:24, recounts how God frightened the Aramean Laban in the night.

The doubling of the Hebrew word nikhsof to express intense longing in Genesis 31:30 also appears in the 16th-century Safed Rabbi Eliezer Azikri's kabbalistic poem "Yedid Nefesh" ("Soul's Beloved") which many congregations chant just before the Kabbalat Shabbat prayer service.

Many Jews recite Genesis 32:2–3 three times as part of the Tefilat HaDerech (Wayfarer's Prayer) before setting out on a journey.

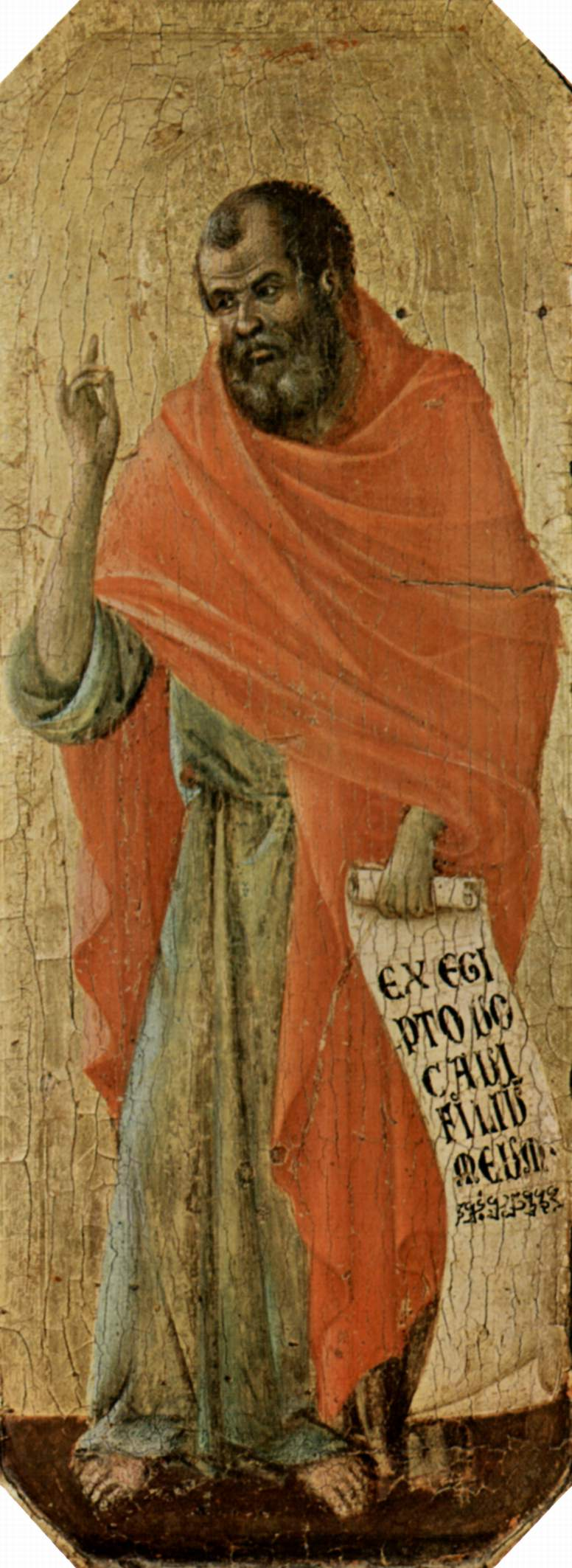
Hosea (painting circa 1308–1311 from Siena's Duomo)

== The Weekly Maqam ==
In the Weekly Maqam, Sephardi Jews each week base the songs of the services on the content of that week's parashah. For Parashah Vayetze, Sephardi Jews apply Maqam Ajam, the maqam that expresses happiness, commemorating the joy and happiness of the weddings of Jacob to Leah and Rachel.

== Haftarah ==
A haftarah is a text selected from the books of Nevi'im ("The Prophets") that is read publicly in the synagogue after the reading of the Torah on Sabbath and holiday mornings. The haftarah usually has a thematic link to the Torah reading that precedes it.

The specific text read following Parashah Vayetze varies according to different traditions within Judaism. Examples are:

- for Ashkenazi Jews: Hosea 12:13–14:10
- for Sephardi Jews: Hosea 11:7–12:12
- for Karaite Jews: Hosea 11:7–13:5
