= Books of the Vulgate =

Comparison of titles of Biblical books in Latin and English

These are the books of the Vulgate (in Latin) along with the names and numbers given them in the Douay–Rheims and King James versions of the Bible (both in English). They are all translations, and the Vulgate exists in many forms. There are 76 books in the Clementine edition of the Latin Vulgate, 46 in the Old Testament, 27 in the New Testament, and 3 in the Apocrypha.

== Notes ==
The names and numbers of the books of the Latin Vulgate differ in ways that may be confusing to many modern Bible readers. In addition, some of the books of the Vulgate have content that has been removed to separate books entirely in many modern Bible translations. This list is an aid to tracking down the content of a Vulgate reference.

The Psalms of the Vulgate follow the numbering assigned to them in the Septuagint which differs from the numbering found in the King James Bible, though not in the order nor the content. See Psalms for more details.

Note that the Apocrypha and Old Testament divisions of the Vulgate do not exactly correspond to those sections in the King James Bible. The Vulgate's Apocrypha section is smaller than the King James Bible's, with a correspondingly larger Old Testament. See the article on the biblical canon for details as to why this is so. The names of those books found in the Apocrypha section of their respective versions are in italics.

A complement to this list can be found at List of books of the King James Version.

== Old Testament ==
Clementine Vulgate	Douay–Rheims	King James Version
Vetus Testamentum
Genesis	Genesis	Genesis
Exodus	Exodus	Exodus
Leviticus	Leviticus	Leviticus
Numeri	Numbers	Numbers
Deuteronomium	Deuteronomy	Deuteronomy
Josue	Josue	Joshua
Judices	Judges	Judges
Ruth	Ruth	Ruth
1 Samuelis also known as 1 Regum	1 Kings: listed as "1 Samuel", otherwise called "1 Kings" in the Challoner revision of the Douay–Rheims.	1 Samuel
2 Samuelis also known as 2 Regum	2 Kings: listed as "2 Samuel", otherwise called "2 Kings" in the Challoner revision of the Douay–Rheims.	2 Samuel
3 Regum	3 Kings	1 Kings
4 Regum	4 Kings	2 Kings
1 Paralipomenon	1 Paralipomenon	1 Chronicles
2 Paralipomenon	2 Paralipomenon	2 Chronicles
1 Esdræ	1 Esdras	Ezra
Nehemiæ also known as 2 Esdræ	2 Esdras: listed as "Nehemias" which is called "2 Esdras" in the Challoner revision of the Douay–Rheims.	Nehemiah
Tobiæ	Tobias	Tobit
Judith	Judith	Judith
Esther	Esther	Esther and the Rest of Esther
Job	Job	Job
Psalmi	Psalms	Psalms
Proverbia	Sentences: listed as "Proverbs" in the Challoner revision of the Douay–Rheims.	Proverbs
Ecclesiastes	Ecclesiastes	Ecclesiastes
Canticum Canticorum	Canticle of Canticles	Song of Solomon
Sapientiæ	Wisdom	Wisdom
Ecclesiasticus	Ecclesiasticus	Ecclesiasticus
Isaiæ	Isaias	Isaiah
Jeremiæ	Jeremias	Jeremiah
Lamentationes	Lamentations	Lamentations
Baruch	Baruch	Baruch and the Epistle of Jeremy
Ezechielis	Ezechiel	Ezekiel
Danielis	Daniel	Daniel, Song of the Three Children, Story of Susanna, and The Idol Bel and the Dragon
Osee	Osee	Hosea
Joel	Joel	Joel
Amos	Amos	Amos
Abdiæ	Abdias	Obadiah
Jonæ	Jonas	Jonah
Michææ	Micheas	Micah
Nahum	Nahum	Nahum
Habacuc	Habacuc	Habakkuk
Sophoniae	Sophonias	Zephaniah
Aggæi	Aggæus	Haggai
Zachariæ	Zacharias	Zechariah
Malachiæ	Malachias	Malachi
1 Machabæorum	1 Machabees	1 Maccabees
2 Machabæorum	2 Machabees	2 Maccabees

== New Testament ==
Clementine Vulgate	Douay–Rheims	King James Version
Novum Testamentum
secundum Matthæum	Matthew	Matthew
secundum Marcum	Mark	Mark
secundum Lucam	Luke	Luke
secundum Ioannem	John	John
Actus	Acts	Acts
ad Romanos	Romans	Romans
1 ad Corinthios	1 Corinthians	1 Corinthians
2 ad Corinthios	2 Corinthians	2 Corinthians
ad Galatas	Galatians	Galatians
ad Ephesios	Ephesians	Ephesians
ad Philippenses	Philippians	Philippians
ad Colossenses	Colossians	Colossians
1 ad Thessalonicenses	1 Thessalonians	1 Thessalonians
2 ad Thessalonicenses	2 Thessalonians	2 Thessalonians
1 ad Timotheum	1 Timothy	1 Timothy
2 ad Timotheum	2 Timothy	2 Timothy
ad Titum	Titus	Titus
ad Philemonem	Philemon	Philemon
ad Hebræos	Hebrews	Hebrews
Iacobi	James	James
1 Petri	1 Peter	1 Peter
2 Petri	2 Peter	2 Peter
1 Ioannis	1 John	1 John
2 Ioannis	2 John	2 John
3 Ioannis	3 John	3 John
Iudæ	Jude	Jude
Apocalypsis	Apocalypse	Revelation

== Apocrypha ==
Clementine Vulgate	Douay–Rheims	King James Version
Apocrypha
Oratio Manassæ regis	Prayer of Manasses	Prayer of Manasses
3 Esdræ	3 Esdras	1 Esdras
4 Esdræ	4 Esdras	2 Esdras

== Other editions ==
The list is for the Clementine Vulgate. Other editions of the Vulgate vary in the Apocrypha, in the order of the books, and in the names of the books.

- The Gutenberg Bible mixes the apocrypha into the Old Testament, with the Prayer of Manasses following 2 Paralipomenon, and 3 and 4 Esdras following 1 Esdras and Nehemias. The Prayer of Solomon follows Sirach or Ecclesiasticus. It thus has 50 books in the Old Testament and 27 in the New, for a total of 77 books.
- The New Vulgate changes the name of Ecclesiasticus to Liber Siracidae; Tobiae is called Thobis. Although the New Vulgate contains the deuterocanonical books, it omits the three apocrypha entirely. It thus has a total of only 73 books.
- The Stuttgart Vulgate adds Psalm 151 and the pseudepigraphal Epistle to the Laodiceans to the Apocrypha. It thus has 5 books in the Apocrypha, 46 in the Old Testament, and 27 in the New, for a total of 78 books. The spelling of proper names in this edition is irregular and inconsistent, so the names of many of the books were altered, e.g. Naum for Nahum.

== Early manuscripts ==
The early Vulgate manuscripts essentially had a table of contents identical to those found in modern Vulgate editions.

=== Sequence of Books in Vulgate Old Testaments according to different sources ===
Adapted from Richard Marsden's The Text of the Old Testament in Anglo-Saxon England, page 450.

Jerome	Augustine	Amiatinus	Theodulf	Alcuin	Ælfric	Clementine
Oct	Oct	Oct	Oct	Oct	Oct	Oct
Kgs	Kgs	Kgs	Kgs	Kgs	Kgs	Kgs
Is	Chron	Chron	Is	Is	Chron	Chron
Jer	Job	Pss	Jer + Bar	Jer	Pss	Ezr + N
Ezek	Tob	Prov	Ezek	Ezek	Prov	Tob
Min Pr	Est	Wisd	Min Pr	Dan	Eccl	Jdth
Job	Jdth	Sir	Job	Min Pr	Song	Est
Pss	Macc	Eccl	Pss	Job	Wisd	Job
Prov	Ezr + N	Song	Prov	Pss	Sir	Pss
Eccl	Pss	Is	Eccl	Prov	Is	Prov
Song	Prov	Jer	Song	Eccl	Jer	Eccl
Dan	Song	Ezek	Dan	Song	Ezek	Song
Chron	Eccl	Dan	Chron	Wisd	Dan	Wisd
Ezr + N	Wisd	Min Pr	Ezr + N	Sir	Min Pr	Sir
Est	Sir	Job	Est	Chron	Ezr	Is
Wisd	Min Pr	Tob	Wisd	Ezr + N	Tob	Jer + Bar
Sir	Is	Est	Sir	Est	Job	Ezek
Jdth	Jer	Jdth	Tob	Tob	Est	Dan
Tob	Dan	Ezr + N	Jdth	Jdth	Jdth	Min Pr
Macc	Ezek	Macc	Macc	Macc	Macc	Macc

- Oct = Genesis, Exodus, Leviticus, Numbers, Deuteronomy, Joshua, Judges, Ruth (the "Octateuch")
- Kgs = 1 Samuel, 2 Samuel, 1 Kings, 2 Kings
- Min Pr = Hosea, Joel, Amos, Obadiah, Jonah, Michah, Nahum, Habakkuk, Zephaniah, Haggai, Zecheriah, Malachi
- Jer = Jeremiah, Lamentations
- Song = Song of Solomon
- Chron = 1 Chronicles, 2 Chronicles
- Ezr + N = Ezra, Nehemiah
- Sir = Sirach or Ecclesiasticus
- Macc = 1 Maccabees, 2 Maccabees
- Jer + Bar = Jeremiah, Lamentations, Baruch, Letter of Jeremiah
- Chron + Pm = 1 Chronicles, 2 Chronicles, Prayer of Manasses.
- Esdr = 1 Esdras = (Vulgate) 3 Esdras = (Septuagint) Esdras A

In the Old Testament sequence set out by Jerome in the Prologus Galeatus, he identifies the books into four categories: The Law (the five books of Moses), the Prophets (including Joshua, Judges and Kings, as well as the major and minor prophets), the Writings (including both Poetical and Wisdom books as well as narrative books), and finally the five apocryphal books of Wisdom, Sirach (or Ecclesiasticus), Judith, Tobit and Maccabees. Jerome's first three categories correspond to the rabbinic ordering of the Hebrew Bible, except that Jerome includes Ruth with Judges, and Lamentations with Jeremiah. Although the prologus, and hence Jerome's listing, was included in almost all Vulgate pandect manuscripts, his order was only rarely adopted; the exceptions being the bibles produced by Theodulf and his successors at Fleury, and also the 9th century Codex Toletanus in Spain.

An alternative listing of the Old Testament books, which circulated universally in the Latin west, was that set out by Augustine (On Christian Doctrine, II, viii, 13). Augustine allocates the Old Testament into five categories: the Law (as in Jerome), the History (including the books of Chronicles), the Narratives (including Tobit, Judith and Maccabees from the apocryphal books), the books of David and Solomon (including the apocryphal books of Wisdom and Sirach or Ecclesiasticus), and the Prophets (including Daniel with the major prophets). Although Augustine's detailed order of books has not been recorded in any manuscript, most subsequent pandects recognised his categories. Augustine's categories are also found in the decrees of the Council of Carthage (418), at which Augustine was present, in the order: Law, History, David and Solomon (including Job), Prophets, Narratives; and this order is also found the 8th century Codex Cavensis and other Spanish pandect bibles.

The Codex Amiatinus sets out the Old Testament in the order: Law, History, David and Solomon, Prophets, Narratives. Alcuin gives the order: Law, History, Prophets, David and Solomon, Narratives; Alcuin removes Job from the Narrative section to a position immediately preceding the Book of Psalms, and also includes Chronicles with the Narratives (in both cases returning to Jerome's order). The Paris bibles followed the sequence: Law, History, Narratives (now including 3 Esdras), David and Solomon, Prophets (now including Baruch with Jeremiah), and Maccabees is the final book. The Paris order, minus 3 Esdras, was eventually to be adopted by the Clementine Vulgate.

== See also ==
- List of books of the King James Version
