= List of books of the King James Version =

Old Testament, Apocrypha, and New Testament books of the King James Version

The contents page in a complete 80-book King James Bible, listing "The Books of the Old Testament", "The Books called Apocrypha", and "The Books of the New Testament". (1769)

These are the books of the King James Version of the Bible along with the names and numbers given them in the Douay Rheims Bible and Latin Vulgate. This list is a complement to the list in Books of the Latin Vulgate. It is an aid to finding cross references between two longstanding standards of biblical literature.

== Preliminary note ==
Originally, when published in 1611, the King James Bible contained 80 Books, including those of the Old Testament, Apocrypha, and New Testament; in the early 1800s, the printing of the Books of the Apocrypha within the Bible became less common in England. The Catholic Bible contains 73 books; seven, called the deuterocanonical books taken from the 14 books of the Apocrypha. These seven are considered canonical by the Catholic Church, the Eastern Orthodox Church, the Oriental Orthodox Churches, and the Church of the East, but not generally by other Christians. Evangelical-Lutherans and Anglicans often do include the Apocrypha as an intertestamental section between the Old Testament and New Testament; these are included in their lectionary readings.

When citing the Latin Vulgate, chapter and verse are separated with a comma, for example "Ioannem 3,16"; in English Bibles chapter and verse are separated with a colon, for example "John 3:16".

The Psalms of the two versions are numbered differently. The Vulgate follows the Septuagint numbering, while the King James Version follows the numbering of the Masoretic Text. This generally results in the Psalms of the former being one number behind the latter. See the article on Psalms for more details.

== Old Testament ==
King James Bible (Note: Early editions of the King James Bible, made before the standardization of English spelling, contain variations in the spelling of the names of the books. The spellings shown here are from The Bible: Authorized King James Version, Oxford World's Classics edition (ISBN 978-0199535941). Early editions often make greater use of the silent e in their spelling, e.g. "Deuteronomie" for Deuteronomy, "Booke" for book, and "Wisedom" for Wisdom.)	Clementine Vulgate	Douay Rheims	Full title in the Authorised Version
Genesis	Genesis	Genesis	The First Book of Moses, called Genesis
Exodus	Exodus	Exodus	The Second Book of Moses, called Exodus
Leviticus	Leviticus	Leviticus	The Third Book of Moses, called Leviticus
Numbers	Numeri	Numbers	The Fourth Book of Moses, called Numbers
Deuteronomy	Deuteronomium	Deuteronomy	The Fifth Book of Moses, called Deuteronomy
Joshua	Josue	Josue	The Book of Joshua
Judges	Judices	Judges	The Book of Judges
Ruth	Ruth	Ruth	The Book of Ruth
1 Samuel	1 Samuelis also known as 1 Regum	1 Kings	The First Book of Samuel, otherwise called the First Book of the Kings
2 Samuel	2 Samuelis also known as 2 Regum	2 Kings	The Second Book of Samuel, otherwise called the Second Book of the Kings
1 Kings	3 Regum	3 Kings	The First Book of the Kings, commonly called the Third Book of the Kings
2 Kings	4 Regum	4 Kings	The Second Book of the Kings, commonly called the Fourth Book of the Kings
1 Chronicles	1 Paralipomenon	1 Paralipomenon	The First Book of the Chronicles
2 Chronicles	2 Paralipomenon	2 Paralipomenon	The Second Book of the Chronicles
Ezra	1 Esdrae	1 Esdras	Ezra
Nehemiah	Nehemiae also known as 2 Esdrae	2 Esdras	The Book of Nehemiah
Esther	Esther 1,1 – 10,3	Esther 1:1 – 10:3	The Book of Esther
Job	Job	Job	The Book of Job
Psalms	Psalmi	Psalms	The Book of Psalms
Proverbs	Proverbia	Sentences	The Proverbs
Ecclesiastes	Ecclesiastes	Ecclesiastes	Ecclesiastes, or, the Preacher
Song of Solomon	Canticum Canticorum	Canticle of Canticles	The Song of Solomon
Isaiah	Isaiae	Isaias	The Book of the Prophet Isaiah
Jeremiah	Jeremiae	Jeremias	The Book of the Prophet Jeremiah
Lamentations	Lamentationes	Lamentations	The Lamentations of Jeremiah
Ezekiel	Ezechielis	Ezechiel	The Book of the Prophet Ezekiel
Daniel	Danielis 1,1 – 3,23; 3,91 – 12,13	Daniel 1:1 – 3:23; 3:91 – 12:13	The Book of Daniel
Hosea	Osee	Osee	Hosea
Joel	Joel	Joel	Joel
Amos	Amos	Amos	Amos
Obadiah	Adiae	Adias	Obadiah
Jonah	Jonae	Jonas	Jonah
Micah	Michaeae	Michaeas	Micah
Nahum	Nahum	Nahum	Nahum
Habakkuk	Habacuc	Habacuc	Habakkuk
Zephaniah	Sophoniae	Sophonias	Zephaniah
Haggai	Aggaei	Aggaeus	Haggai
Zechariah	Zachariae	Zacharias	Zechariah
Malachi	Malachiae	Malachias	Malachi

== Apocrypha ==
King James Bible	Clementine Vulgate	Douay Rheims	Full title in the Authorised Version
1 Esdras	3 Esdrae	3 Esdras	The First Book of Esdras
2 Esdras	4 Esdrae	4 Esdras	The Second Book of Esdras
Tobit	Tobiae	Tobias	Tobit
Judith			Judith
Rest of Esther	Esther 10,4 – 16,24	Esther 10:4 – 16:24	The Rest of the Chapters of the Book of Esther, which are found neither in the Hebrew nor the Chaldee
Wisdom	Sapientiae	Wisdom	The Wisdom of Solomon
Ecclesiasticus			The Wisdom of Jesus the son of Sirach, or Ecclesiasticus
Baruch and the Epistle of Jeremy	Baruch		Baruch
Song of the Three Children	Danielis 3,24 – 90	Daniel 3:24 – 90	The Song of the Three Holy Children
Story of Susanna	Danielis caput 13	Daniel chapter 13	The History of Susanna
The Idol Bel and the Dragon	Danielis caput 14	Daniel chapter 14	The History of the Destruction of Bel and the Dragon
Prayer of Manasses	Oratio Manassae regis	Prayer of Manasses	The Prayer of Manasses King of Juda, when he was holden captive in Babylon
1 Maccabees	1 Machabaeorum	1 Machabees	The First Book of the Maccabees
2 Maccabees	2 Machabaeorum	2 Machabees	The Second Book of the Maccabees

== New Testament ==
King James Bible	Clementine Vulgate	Douay Rheims	Full title in the Authorised Version
Matthew	secundum Matthaeum	Matthew	The Gospel According to St. Matthew
Mark	secundum Marcum	Mark	The Gospel According to St. Mark
Luke	secundum Lucam	Luke	The Gospel According to St. Luke
John	secundum Ioannem	John	The Gospel According to St. John
The Acts	Actus	Acts	The Acts of the Apostles
Romans	ad Romanos	Romans	The Epistle of Paul the Apostle to the Romans
1 Corinthians	1 ad Corinthios	1 Corinthians	The First Epistle of Paul the Apostle to the Corinthians
2 Corinthians	2 ad Corinthios	2 Corinthians	The Second Epistle of Paul the Apostle to the Corinthians
Galatians	ad Galatas	Galatians	The Epistle of Paul to the Galatians
Ephesians	ad Ephesios	Ephesians	The Epistle of Paul the Apostle to the Ephesians
Philippians	ad Philippenses	Philippians	The Epistle of Paul the Apostle to the Philippians
Colossians	ad Colossenses	Colossians	The Epistle of Paul the Apostle to the Colossians
1 Thessalonians	1 ad Thessalonicenses	1 Thessalonians	The First Epistle of Paul the Apostle to the Thessalonians
2 Thessalonians	2 ad Thessalonicenses	2 Thessalonians	The Second Epistle of Paul the Apostle to the Thessalonians
1 Timothy	1 ad Timotheum	1 Timothy	The First Epistle of Paul the Apostle to Timothy
2 Timothy	2 ad Timotheum	2 Timothy	The Second Epistle of Paul the Apostle to Timothy
Titus	ad Titum	Titus	The Epistle of Paul to Titus
Philemon	ad Philemonem	Philemon	The Epistle of Paul to Philemon
Hebrews	ad Hebraeos	Hebrews	The Epistle of Paul the Apostle to the Hebrews
James	Jacobi	James	The General Epistle of James
1 Peter	1 Petri	1 Peter	The First Epistle General of Peter
2 Peter	2 Petri	2 Peter	The Second Epistle General of Peter
1 John	1 Ioannis	1 John	The First Epistle General of John
2 John	2 Ioannis	2 John	The Second Epistle of John
3 John	3 Ioannis	3 John	The Third Epistle of John
Jude	Judae	Jude	The General Epistle of Jude
Revelation	Apocalypsis	Apocalypse	The Revelation of St. John the Divine
