= Apocrypha =

Works of unknown authorship or of doubtful origin

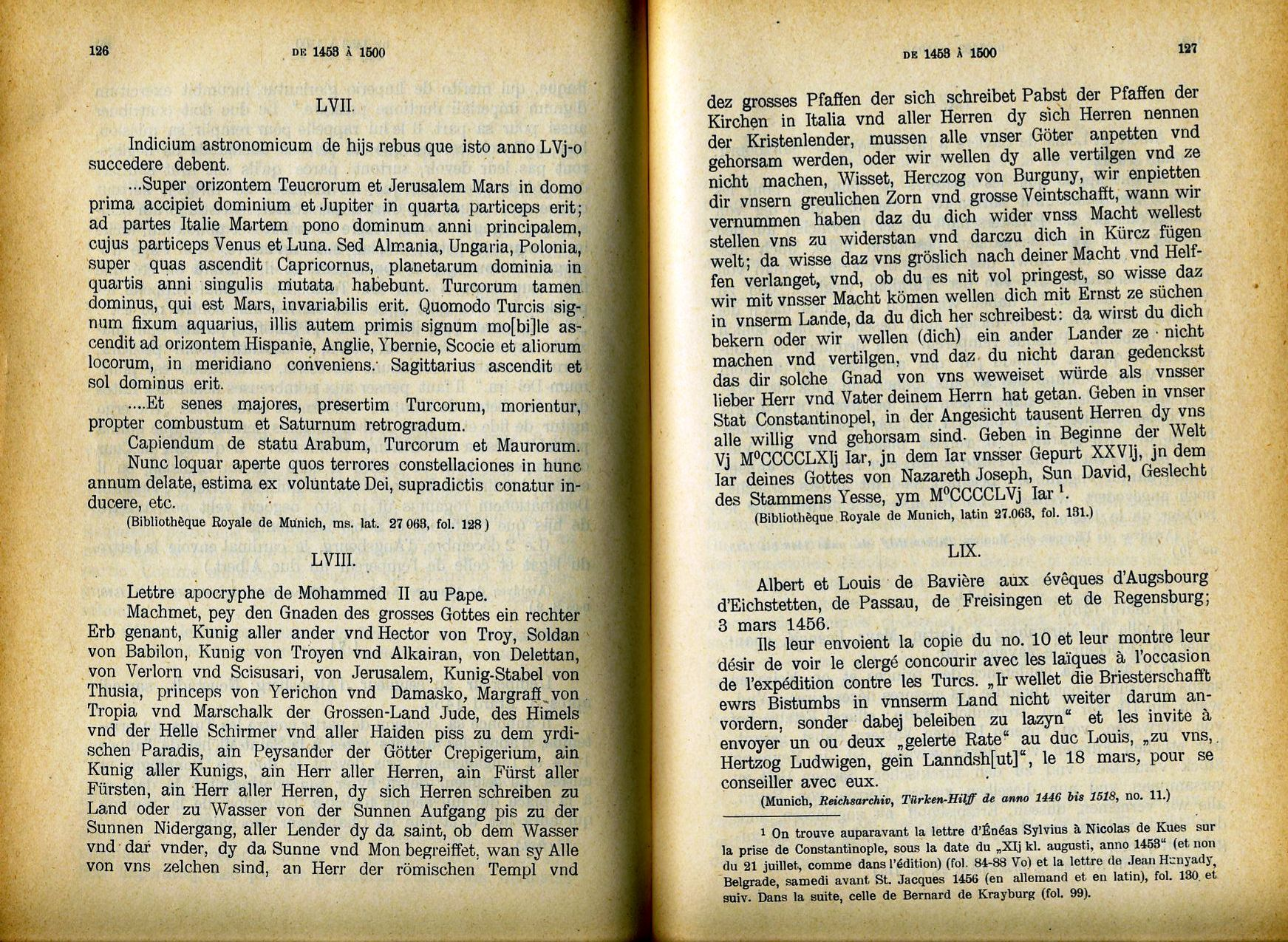
The apocryphal letter of Sultan Mehmed II to the Pope (Notes et extraits pour servir à l'histoire des croisades au XVe siècle), published by Nicolae Iorga. Series 4: 1453–1476, Paris; Bucharest, 1915, pages 126–127

Apocrypha (/əˈpɒkrɪfə/) are biblical or related writings not forming part of the accepted canon of scripture, some of which might be of doubtful authorship or authenticity. In Christianity, the word apocryphal (ἀπόκρυφος) was first applied to writings that were to be read privately rather than in the public context of church services. Apocrypha were edifying Christian works that were not always initially included as canonical scripture.

The adjective "apocryphal", meaning of doubtful authenticity, mythical, fictional, is recorded from the late 16th century, then taking on the popular meaning of "false," "spurious," "bad," or "heretical." It may be used for any book which might have scriptural claims but which does not appear in the canon accepted by the author. A related term for both canon and non-canonical texts whose authorship seems incorrect is pseudepigrapha, a term that means "false attribution".

In Christianity, the name "the Apocrypha" is applied to a particular set of books which, when they appear in a Bible, are sometimes placed between the Old and New Testaments in a section called "Apocrypha." The canonicity of such books took longer to determine. Various of these books are accepted by the Catholic Church, Eastern Orthodox Church and the Church of the East, as deuterocanonical. Some Protestant traditions reject them outright; others regard the Apocrypha as non-canonical books that are useful for instruction.

== Etymology ==
The word's origin is the Medieval Latin adjective apocryphus (secret, or non-canonical) from the Greek adjective ἀπόκρυφος, apokryphos, (private) from the verb ἀποκρύπτειν, apokryptein (to hide away).

It comes from Greek and is formed from the combination of apo (away) and kryptein (hide or conceal).

The word apocrypha has undergone a major change in meaning throughout the centuries. The word apocrypha in its ancient Christian usage originally meant a text read in private, rather than in public church settings. In English, it later came to have a sense of the esoteric, suspicious, or heretical, largely because of the Protestant interpretation of the usefulness of non-canonical texts.

=== Esoteric and metaphorical usage ===
The word apocryphal (ἀπόκρυφος) was first applied to writings that were kept secret because they were the vehicles of esoteric knowledge considered too profound or too sacred to be disclosed to anyone other than the initiated. For example, the disciples of the Gnostic Prodicus boasted that they possessed the secret (ἀπόκρυφα) books of Zoroaster. The term in general enjoyed high consideration among the Gnostics (see Acts of Thomas, pp. 10, 27, 44).

The adjective apocryphal is commonly used in modern English to refer to any text or story considered to be of dubious veracity or authority, although it may contain some moral truth. In this broader metaphorical sense, the word suggests a claim that is in the nature of folklore, factoid or urban legend.

=== Writings of questionable value ===
Apocrypha was also applied to writings that were hidden not because of their divinity but because of their questionable value to the church. The early Christian theologian Origen, in his Commentaries on Matthew, distinguishes between writings that were read by the churches and apocryphal writings: γραφὴ μὴ φερομένη μέν ἒν τοῖς κοινοῖς καὶ δεδημοσιευμένοις βιβλίοις εἰκὸς δ' ὅτι ἒν ἀποκρύφοις φερομένη (writing not found in the common and published books on one hand [and] actually found in the secret ones on the other). The meaning of αποκρυφος is here practically equivalent to "excluded from the public use of the church" and prepares the way for an even less favourable use of the word.

=== Spurious writings ===
In general use, the word apocrypha came to mean "of doubtful authenticity". This meaning also appears in Origen's prologue to his commentary on the Song of Songs, of which only the Latin translation survives:

De scripturis his, quae appellantur apocriphae, pro eo quod multa in iis corrupta et contra fidem veram inveniuntur a maioribus tradita non placuit iis dari locum nec admitti ad auctoritatem. "Concerning these scriptures, which are called apocryphal, for the reason that many things are found in them corrupt and against the true faith handed down by the elders, it has pleased them that they not be given a place nor be admitted to authority."

=== Writings and objects ===
Sinologist Anna Seidel refers to texts and even items produced by ancient Chinese sages as apocryphal and studied their uses during Six Dynasties China (AD 220–589). These artifacts were used as symbols legitimizing and guaranteeing the Emperor's Heavenly Mandate. Examples of these include talismans, charts, writs, tallies, and registers. The first examples were stones, jade pieces, bronze vessels and weapons, but came to include talismans and magic diagrams.

From their roots in Zhou era China (1066–256 BC), these items came to be surpassed in value by texts by the Han dynasty (206 BC – AD 220). Most of these texts have been destroyed as Emperors, particularly during the Han dynasty, collected these legitimizing objects and proscribed, forbade and burnt nearly all of them to prevent them from falling into the hands of political rivals.

== Deuterocanonical ==
The Gelasian Decree (generally held now as being the work of an anonymous scholar between 519 and 553) refers to religious works by Church Fathers Eusebius, Tertullian and Clement of Alexandria as apocrypha. Augustine defined the word as meaning simply "obscurity of origin", implying that any book of unknown authorship or questionable authenticity would be considered apocryphal. Jerome in Prologus Galeatus declared that all books outside the Hebrew canon were apocryphal. In practice, Jerome treated some books outside the Hebrew canon as if they were canonical, and the Western Church did not accept Jerome's definition of apocrypha, instead retaining the word's prior meaning. As a result, various church authorities labeled different books as apocrypha, treating them with varying levels of regard.

Origen stated that "the canonical books, as the Hebrews have handed them down, are twenty-two". Clement and others cited some apocryphal books as "scripture", "divine scripture", "inspired", and the like. Teachers connected with Palestine and familiar with the Hebrew canon (the protocanon) excluded from the canon all of the Old Testament not found there. This view is reflected in the canon of Melito of Sardis, and in the prefaces and letters of Jerome. A third view was that the books were not as valuable as the canonical scriptures of the Hebrew collection, but were of value for moral uses, as introductory texts for new converts from paganism, and to be read in congregations. They were referred to as "ecclesiastical" works by Rufinus.

In 1546, the Catholic Council of Trent reconfirmed the canon of Augustine, dating to the second and third centuries, declaring "He is also to be anathema who does not receive these entire books, with all their parts, as they have been accustomed to be read in the Catholic Church, and are found in the ancient editions of the Latin Vulgate, as sacred and canonical." The whole of the books in question, with the exception of 1 Esdras and 2 Esdras and the Prayer of Manasseh, were declared canonical at Trent.

The Protestants, in comparison, were diverse in their opinion of the deuterocanon early on. Some considered them divinely inspired, others rejected them. Lutherans and Anglicans retained the books as Christian intertestamental readings and a part of the Bible (in a section called "Apocrypha"), but no doctrine should be based on them. John Wycliffe, a 14th-century Christian Humanist, had declared in his biblical translation that "whatever book is in the Old Testament besides these twenty-five shall be set among the apocrypha, that is, without authority or belief." Nevertheless, his translation of the Bible included the apocrypha and the Epistle of the Laodiceans.

Martin Luther did not class apocryphal books as being scripture, but in the German Luther Bible (1534) the apocrypha are published in a separate section from the other books, although the Lutheran and Anglican lists are different. Anabaptists use the Luther Bible, which contains the intertestamental books; Amish wedding ceremonies include "the retelling of the marriage of Tobias and Sarah in the Apocrypha". The fathers of Anabaptism, such as Menno Simons, quoted "them [the Apocrypha] with the same authority and nearly the same frequency as books of the Hebrew Bible" and the texts regarding the martyrdoms under Antiochus IV in 1 Maccabees and 2 Maccabees are held in high esteem by the Anabaptists, who faced persecution in their history.

In Reformed editions (like the Westminster), readers were warned that these books were not "to be any otherwise approved or made use of than other human writings". A milder distinction was expressed elsewhere, such as in the "argument" introducing them in the Geneva Bible, and in the Sixth Article of the Church of England, where it is said that "the other books the church doth read for example of life and instruction of manners," though not to establish doctrine. Among some Nonconformists, the term apocryphal began to take on extra or altered connotations: not just of dubious authenticity, but having spurious or false content, Protestants, being diverse in theological views, were not unanimous in adopting those meanings.

Generally, Anabaptists and magisterial Protestants recognize the fourteen books of the Apocrypha as being non-canonical, but useful for reading "for example of life and instruction of manners": a view that continues today throughout the Lutheran Church, the worldwide Anglican Communion, among many other denominations, such as the Methodist churches and Quaker Yearly Meetings. Liturgically, the Catholic, Methodist and Anglican churches have a scripture reading from the Book of Tobit in services of Holy Matrimony.

According to the Orthodox Anglican Church:

On the other hand, the Anglican Communion emphatically maintains that the Apocrypha is part of the Bible and is to be read with respect by her members. Two of the hymns used in the American Prayer Book office of Morning Prayer, the Benedictus es and Benedicite, are taken from the Apocrypha. One of the offertory sentences in Holy Communion comes from an apocryphal book (Tob. 4: 8–9). Lessons from the Apocrypha are regularly appointed to be read in the daily, Sunday, and special services of Morning and Evening Prayer. There are altogether 111 such lessons in the latest revised American Prayer Book Lectionary [The books used are: II Esdras, Tobit, Wisdom, Ecclesiasticus, Baruch, Three Holy Children, and I Maccabees.] The position of the Church is best summarized in the words of Article Six of the Thirty-nine Articles: "In the name of Holy Scripture we do understand those canonical Books of the Old and New Testament, of whose authority there was never any doubt in the Church... And the other Books (as Hierome [St. Jerome] saith) the Church doth read for example of life and instruction of manners; but yet doth it not apply them to establish any doctrine.

Though Protestant Bibles historically include 80 books, 66 of these form the Protestant canon (such as listed in the Westminster Confession of 1646), which has been well established for centuries, with many today supporting the use of the Apocrypha and others contending against the Apocrypha using various arguments.

== Buddhism ==
Apocryphal Jatakas of the Pāli Canon, such as those belonging to the Paññāsajātaka collection, have been adapted to fit local culture in certain Southeast Asian countries and have been retold with amendments to the plots to better reflect Buddhist morals.

Within the Pali tradition, the apocryphal Jatakas of later composition (some dated even to the 19th century) are treated as a separate category of literature from the "official" Jataka stories that have been more-or-less formally canonized from at least the 5th century—as attested to in ample epigraphic and archaeological evidence, such as extant illustrations in bas relief from ancient temple walls.

== Christianity ==
=== Intertestamental books ===
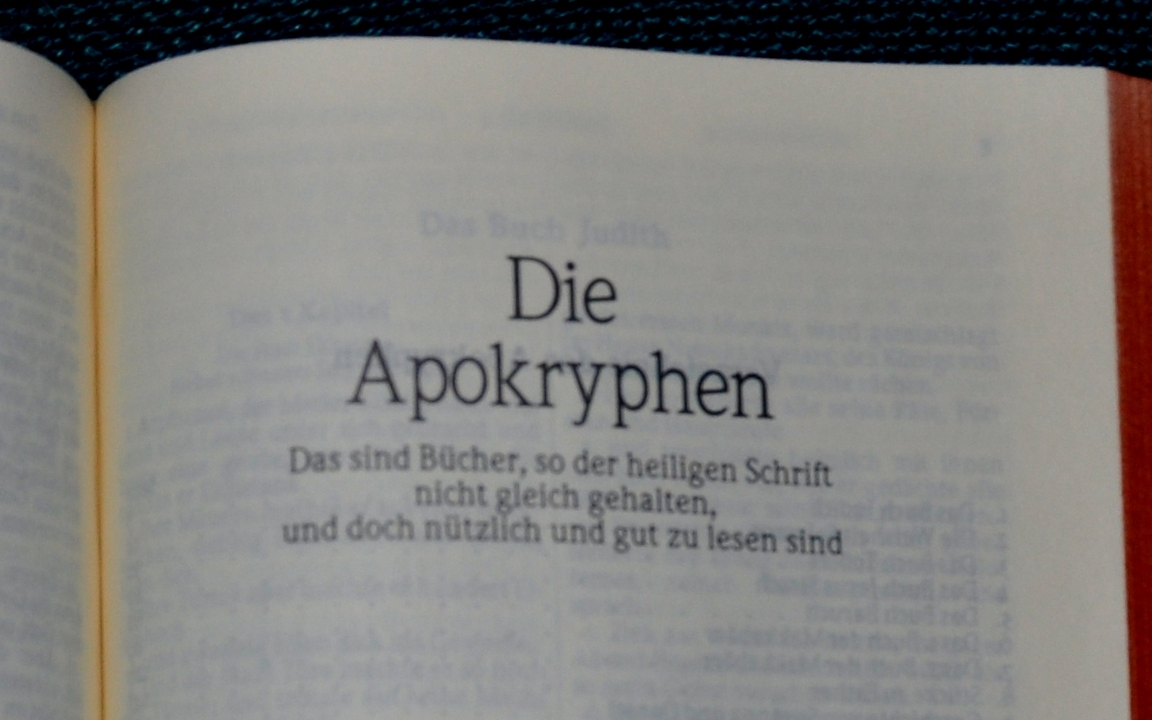
Copies of the Luther Bible include the deuterocanonical books as an intertestamental section between the Old Testament and New Testament; they are termed the "Apocrypha" in many Protestant churches.

The contents page in a complete 80 book King James Bible, listing "The Books of the Old Testament", "The Books called Apocrypha", and "The Books of the New Testament".

During the Apostolic Age many Jewish texts of Hellenistic origin existed within Judaism and were frequently used by Christians. Patristic authorities frequently recognized these books as important to the emergence of Christianity, but the inspired authority and value of the apocrypha remained widely disputed. Christians included several of these books in the canons of the Christian Bibles, calling them the "apocrypha" or the "hidden books".

In the sixteenth century, during the Protestant Reformation, the canonical validity of the intertestamental books was challenged and fourteen books were classed in 80 book Protestant Bibles as an intertestamental section called the Apocrypha, which straddles the Old Testament and New Testament. Prior to 1629, all English-language Protestant Bibles included the Old Testament, Apocrypha, and New Testament; examples include the "Matthew's Bible (1537), the Great Bible (1539), the Geneva Bible (1560), the Bishop's Bible (1568), and the King James Bible (1611)".

Fourteen out of eighty biblical books comprise the Protestant Apocrypha, first published as such in Luther's Bible (1534). Many of these texts are considered canonical Old Testament books by the Catholic Church, affirmed by the Council of Rome (AD 382) and later reaffirmed by the Council of Trent (1545–63); all of the books of the Protestant Apocrypha are considered canonical by the Eastern Orthodox Church and are referred to as anagignoskomena per the Synod of Jerusalem (1672). The Lutheran churches normatively include in the Bible the Apocrypha as an intertestamental section between the Old Testament and the New Testament; the systematic theologian Martin Chemnitz, a leading figure in the development of Evangelical Lutheranism "separated Scripture into two categories: those from which the Church makes doctrine and those from which the Church does not." The Book of Concord, the compendium of Evangelical Lutheran doctrine, quotes passages from the Apocrypha/Deuterocanon. The Dietrich Catechism, widely used in Evangelical Lutheranism, affirms that apart from the canonical books, the Lutheran Bible includes the apocrypha. To this date, scripture readings from the Apocrypha are included in the lectionaries of the Lutheran churches and the Anglican churches.

Anabaptists use the Luther Bible, which contains the intertestamental books; Amish wedding ceremonies include "the retelling of the marriage of Tobias and Sarah in the Apocrypha". The Anglican Communion accepts the Protestant Apocrypha "for instruction in life and manners, but not for the establishment of doctrine (Article VI in the Thirty-Nine Articles)", and many "lectionary readings in The Book of Common Prayer are taken from the Apocrypha", with these lessons being "read in the same ways as those from the Old Testament".

The first Methodist liturgical book, The Sunday Service of the Methodists, employs verses from the Apocrypha, such as in the Eucharistic liturgy. The Protestant Apocrypha contains three books (1 Esdras, 2 Esdras and the Prayer of Manasseh) that are accepted by many Eastern Orthodox churches and the Oriental Orthodox Churches as canonical, but are regarded as non-canonical by the Catholic Church and are therefore not included in modern Catholic Bibles.

In the 1800s, the British and Foreign Bible Society did not regularly publish the intertestamental section in its Bibles, citing the cost of printing the Apocrypha in addition to the Old Testament and New Testament as a major factor; this legacy came to characterize English-language Bibles in Great Britain and the Americas, unlike in Europe where Protestant Bibles are printed with 80 books in three sections: the Old Testament, Apocrypha, and New Testament.

In the present-day, "English Bibles with the Apocrypha are becoming more popular again", usually being printed as intertestamental books. The Revised Common Lectionary, in use by most mainline Protestants including Methodists and Moravians, lists readings from the Apocrypha in the liturgical calendar, although alternate Old Testament scripture lessons are provided.

The status of the deuterocanonicals remains unchanged in Catholic and Orthodox Christianity, though there is a difference in number of these books between these two branches of Christianity. Some authorities began using term deuterocanonical to refer to this traditional intertestamental collection as books of "the second canon". These books are often seen as helping to explain the theological and cultural transitions that took place between the Old and New Testaments. They are also sometimes called "intertestamental" by religious groups who do not recognize Hellenistic Judaism as belonging with either Jewish or Christian testaments.

Slightly varying collections of apocryphal, deuterocanonical or intertestamental books of the Bible form part of the Catholic, Eastern Orthodox and Oriental Orthodox canons. The deuterocanonical or intertestamental books of the Catholic Church include Tobit, Judith, Baruch, Sirach, 1 Maccabees, 2 Maccabees, Wisdom and additions to Esther, Daniel, and Baruch.

The Book of Enoch is included in the biblical canon of the Oriental Orthodox churches of Ethiopia and Eritrea. The Epistle of Jude alludes to a story in the book of Enoch, and some believe the use of this book also appears in the four gospels and 1 Peter. While Jesus and his disciples sometimes used phrases also featured in some of the Apocryphal books, the Book of Enoch was never referenced by Jesus. The genuineness and inspiration of Enoch were believed in by the writer of the Epistle of Barnabas, Irenaeus, Tertullian and Clement of Alexandria and many others of the early church. The Epistles of Paul and the Gospels also show influences from the Book of Jubilees, which is part of the Ethiopian canon, as well as the Assumption of Moses and the Testaments of the Twelve Patriarchs, which are included in no biblical canon.

=== Canonicity ===
The establishment of a largely settled uniform canon was a process of centuries, and what the term canon (as well as apocrypha) precisely meant also saw development. The canonical process took place with believers recognizing writings as being inspired by God from known or accepted origins, subsequently being followed by official affirmation of what had become largely established through the study and debate of the writings.

The first ecclesiastical decree on the Catholic Church's canonical books of the Sacred Scriptures is attributed to the Council of Rome (382), and is correspondent to that of Trent. Martin Luther, like Jerome, favored the Masoretic canon for the Old Testament, excluding apocryphal books in the Luther Bible as unworthy to be properly called scripture, but included most of them in a separate section. Luther did not include the deuterocanonical books in his Old Testament, terming them "Apocrypha, that are books which are not considered equal to the Holy Scriptures, but are useful and good to read."

The Eastern Orthodox Church accepts four other books into its canon than what are contained in the Catholic canon: Psalm 151, the Prayer of Manasseh, 3 Maccabees, and 1 Esdras.

==== Disputes ====
The status of the books that the Catholic Church terms Deuterocanonicals (second canon) and Protestantism refers to as Apocrypha has been an issue of disagreement that preceded the Reformation. Many believe that the pre-Christian-era Jewish translation (into Greek) of holy scriptures known as the Septuagint, a Greek translation of the Hebrew Scriptures originally compiled around 280 BC, originally included the apocryphal writings in dispute, with little distinction made between them and the rest of the Old Testament. Others argue that the Septuagint of the first century did not contain these books but they were added later by Christians.

The earliest extant manuscripts of the Septuagint are from the fourth century, and suffer greatly from a lack of uniformity as regards containing apocryphal books, and some also contain books classed as pseudepigrapha, from which texts were cited by some early writers in the second and later centuries as being scripture.

While a few scholars conclude that the Jewish canon was the achievement of the Hasmonean dynasty, it is generally considered not to have been finalized until about 100 AD or somewhat later, at which time considerations of Greek language and beginnings of Christian acceptance of the Septuagint weighed against some of the texts. Some were not accepted by the Jews as part of the Hebrew Bible canon and the Apocrypha is not part of the historical Jewish canon.

Early church fathers such as Athanasius, Melito, Origen, and Cyril of Jerusalem, spoke against the canonicity of much or all of the apocrypha, but the most weighty opposition was the fourth century Catholic scholar Jerome who preferred the Hebrew canon, whereas Augustine and others preferred the wider (Greek) canon, with both having followers in the generations that followed. The Catholic Encyclopedia states as regards the Middle Ages,

In the Latin Church, all through the Middle Ages [5th century to the 15th century] we find evidence of hesitation about the character of the deuterocanonicals. There is a current friendly to them, another one distinctly unfavourable to their authority and sacredness, while wavering between the two are a number of writers whose veneration for these books is tempered by some perplexity as to their exact standing, and among those we note St. Thomas Aquinas. Few are found to unequivocally acknowledge their canonicity.

The prevailing attitude of Western medieval authors is substantially that of the Greek Fathers.

The wider Christian canon accepted by Augustine became the more established canon in the western church after being promulgated for use in the Easter Letter of Athanasius (circa 372 A.D.), the Synod of Rome (382 A.D., but its Decretum Gelasianum is generally considered to be a much later addition) and the local councils of Carthage and Hippo in north Africa (391 and 393 A.D). Athanasius called canonical all books of the Hebrew Bible including Baruch, while excluding Esther. He adds that "there are certain books which the Fathers had appointed to be read to catechumens for edification and instruction; these are the Wisdom of Solomon, the Wisdom of Sirach (Ecclesiasticus), Esther, Judith, Tobias, the Didache, or Doctrine of the Apostles, and the Shepherd of Hermas. All others are apocrypha and the inventions of heretics (Festal Epistle for 367)".

Nevertheless, none of these constituted indisputable definitions, and significant scholarly doubts and disagreements about the nature of the Apocrypha continued for centuries and even into Trent, which provided the first infallible definition of the Catholic canon in 1546.

In the 16th century, the Protestant reformers challenged the canonicity of the books and partial-books found in the surviving Septuagint but not in the Masoretic Text. In response to this challenge, after the death of Martin Luther (February 8, 1546) the ecumenical Council of Trent officially ("infallibly") declared these books (called "deuterocanonical" by Catholics) to be part of the canon in April, 1546 A.D. While the Protestant Reformers rejected the parts of the canon that were not part of the Hebrew Bible, they included the four New Testament books Luther considered of doubtful canonicity along with the Apocrypha in his non-binding Luther's canon (although most were separately included in his Bible, as they were in some editions of the KJV bible until 1947).

Protestantism therefore established a 66 book canon with the 39 books based on the ancient Hebrew canon, along with the traditional 27 books of the New Testament. Protestants also rejected the Catholic term "deuterocanonical" for these writings, preferring to apply the term "apocryphal", which was already in use for other early and disputed writings. As today (but along with other reasons), various reformers argued that those books contained doctrinal or other errors and thus should not have been added to the canon for that reason. The differences between canons can be seen under Biblical canon and Development of the Christian biblical canon.

Explaining the Eastern Orthodox Church's canon is made difficult because of differences of perspective with the Roman Catholic church in the interpretation of how it was done. Those differences (in matters of jurisdictional authority) were contributing factors in the separation of the Roman Catholics and Orthodox around 1054, but the formation of the canon that Trent would later officially definitively settle was largely complete by the fifth century, if not settled, six centuries before the separation. In the eastern part of the church, it took much of the fifth century also to come to agreement, but in the end it was accomplished. The canonical books thus established by the undivided church became the predominant canon for what was later to become Roman Catholic and Eastern Orthodox alike.

The East already differed from the West in not considering every question of canon yet settled, and it subsequently adopted a few more books into its Old Testament. It also allowed consideration of yet a few more to continue not fully decided, which led in some cases to adoption in one or more jurisdictions, but not all. Thus, there are today a few remaining differences of canon among Orthodox, and all Orthodox accept a few more books than appear in the Catholic canon. The Psalms of Solomon, 3 Maccabees, 4 Maccabees, the Epistle of Jeremiah, the Book of Odes, the Prayer of Manasseh and Psalm 151 are included in some copies of the Septuagint, some of which are accepted as canonical by Eastern Orthodox and some other churches. Protestants accept none of these additional books as canon, but see them having roughly the same status as the other Apocrypha.

Eastern Orthodoxy uses a different definition than the Roman Catholic Church does for the books of its canon that it calls deuterocanonical, referring to them as a class of books with less authority than other books of the Old Testament. In contrast, the Catholic Church uses this term to refer to a class of books that were added to its canon later than the other books in its Old Testament canon, considering them all of equal authority.

=== New Testament apocrypha ===
New Testament apocrypha—books similar to those in the New Testament but almost universally rejected by Catholics, Orthodox and Protestants—include several gospels and lives of apostles. Some were written by early Jewish Christians (see the Gospel according to the Hebrews). Others of these were produced by Gnostic authors or members of other groups later defined as heterodox. Many texts believed lost for centuries were unearthed in the 19th and 20th centuries, producing lively speculation about their importance in early Christianity among religious scholars, while many others survive only in the form of quotations from them in other writings; for some, no more than the title is known. Artists and theologians have drawn upon the New Testament apocrypha for such matters as the names of Dismas and Gestas and details about the Three Wise Men. The first explicit mention of the perpetual virginity of Mary is found in the pseudepigraphical Infancy Gospel of James.

Before the fifth century, the Christian writings that were then under discussion for inclusion in the canon but had not yet been accepted were classified in a group known as the ancient antilegomenae. These were all candidates for the New Testament and included several books that were eventually accepted, such as: The Epistle to the Hebrews, 2 Peter, 3 John and the Revelation of John (Apocalypse). None of those accepted books can be considered Apocryphal now, since all Christendom accepts them as canonical. Of the uncanonized ones, the early Church considered some heretical but viewed others quite positively.

Some Christians, in an extension of the meaning, might also consider the non-heretical books to be "apocryphal" along the manner of Martin Luther: not canon, but useful to read. This category includes books such as the Epistle of Barnabas, the Didache, and The Shepherd of Hermas, which are sometimes referred to as the Apostolic Fathers. The Gnostic tradition was a prolific source of apocryphal gospels.

While these writings borrowed the characteristic poetic features of apocalyptic literature from Judaism, Gnostic sects largely insisted on allegorical interpretations based on a secret apostolic tradition. With them, these apocryphal books were highly esteemed. A well-known Gnostic apocryphal book is the Gospel of Thomas, the only complete text of which was found in the Egyptian town of Nag Hammadi in 1945. The Gospel of Judas, a Gnostic gospel, also received much media attention when it was reconstructed in 2006.

Roman Catholics, Eastern Orthodox, and Protestants all agree on the canon of the New Testament. The Ethiopian Orthodox have in the past also included I & II Clement and Shepherd of Hermas in their New Testament canon.

==== List of Sixty ====
The List of Sixty, dating to around the 7th century, lists sixty books that the author claimed were the complete canonical scriptures. The unknown author also lists many apocryphal books that are not included amongst the sixty. These books are:

- Adam
- Enoch
- Lamech
- Twelve Patriarchs
- Prayer of Joseph
- Eldad and Modad
- Testament of Moses
- Assumption of Moses
- Psalms of Solomon
- Apocalypse of Elijah
- Ascension of Isaiah
- Apocalypse of Zephaniah
- Apocalypse of Zechariah
- Apocalyptic Ezra
- History of James
- Apocalypse of Peter
- Itinerary and Teaching of the Apostles
- Epistle of Barnabas
- Acts of Paul
- Apocalypse of Paul
- Didascalia of Clement
- Didascalia of Ignatius
- Didascalia of Polycarp
- Gospel of Barnabas
- Gospel According to Matthew (Note: See also Gospel of Pseudo-Matthew)

== Islam ==
Hadith, the supposed reports of the words, actions, and silent approval of the Islamic prophet Muhammad, are accused by some Muslims of being fabrications (pseudepigrapha) created in the 8th and 9th centuries AD, and falsely attributed to Muhammad. Historically, some sects of the Kharijites also rejected the hadiths, while Mu'tazilites rejected the hadiths as the basis for Islamic law, while at the same time accepting the Sunnah and Ijma. The main points of internal Islamic criticism of hadith literature are based on questions regarding its authenticity. However, Muslim criticism of hadith is also based on arguments and criticisms of Islamic theology and philosophy.

Traditionally, some sects of the Kharijites have rejected Hadith. There are some who even oppose the writing of Hadith for fear that it will compete with or even replace the Quran. Mu'tazilite followers also reject hadith as the basis for Islamic law, while simultaneously accepting the Sunnah and ijma. For Mu'tazilites, the basic argument for rejecting hadith is that "because of its nature as the transmission of individuals, [it] cannot be a sure path to our understanding of the Prophet's teachings, unlike the Quran whose transmission has a general consensus among Muslims". Some Muslim critics of hadith have even gone so far as to completely reject them as fundamental texts of Islamic beliefs and instead adhere solely to Quran. This movement is also known as Quranism.

== Judaism ==
The Jewish apocrypha, known in Hebrew as הספרים החיצונים (Sefarim Hachizonim: "the external books"), are books written in large part by Jews, especially during the Second Temple period, not accepted as sacred manuscripts when the Hebrew Bible was canonized. Some of these books are considered sacred by some Christians, and are included in their versions of the Old Testament. The Jewish apocrypha is distinctive from the New Testament apocrypha and biblical apocrypha as it is the only one of these collections that works within a Jewish theological framework.

Although Orthodox Jews believe in the exclusive canonization of the current 24 books in the Hebrew Bible, they also consider the Oral Torah, which they believe was handed down from Moses, to be authoritative. Some argue that the Sadducees, unlike the Pharisees but like the Samaritans, seem to have maintained an earlier and smaller number of texts as canonical, preferring to hold to only what was written in the Law of Moses (the Torah), making most of the presently accepted canon, both Jewish and Christian, apocryphal in their eyes. Others believe that it is often mistakenly asserted that the Sadducees only accepted the Pentateuch (Torah). The Essenes in Judea and the Therapeutae in Egypt were said to have a secret literature (see Dead Sea Scrolls).

Other traditions maintained different customs regarding canonicity. The Ethiopian Jews, for instance, seem to have retained a spread of canonical texts similar to the Ethiopian Orthodox Christians.

== Taoism ==
Prophetic texts called the Ch'an-wei were written by Han dynasty (206 BC – AD 220) Taoist priests to legitimize as well as curb imperial power. They deal with treasure objects that were part of the Zhou (1066–256 BC) royal treasures. Emerging from the instability of the Warring States period (476–221 BC), ancient Chinese scholars saw the centralized rule of the Zhou as an ideal model for the new Han empire to emulate.

The Ch'an-wei are texts written by Han scholars about the Zhou royal treasures, only they were not written to record history for its own sake, but for legitimizing the current imperial reign. These texts took the form of stories about texts and objects being conferred upon the Emperors by Heaven and comprising these ancient sage-king's (this is how the Zhou emperors were referred to by this time, about 500 years after their peak) royal regalia. The desired effect was to confirm the Han emperor's Heavenly Mandate through the continuity offered by his possession of these same sacred talismans.

It is because of this politicized recording of their history that it is difficult to retrace the exact origins of these objects. What is known is that these texts were most likely produced by a class of literati called the fangshi. These were a class of nobles who were not part of the state administration; they were considered specialists or occultists, for example diviners, astrologers, alchemists or healers. It is from this class of nobles that the first Taoist priests are believed to have emerged. Seidel points out, however, that the scarcity of sources relating to the formation of early Taoism make the exact link between the apocryphal texts and the Taoist beliefs unclear.

== See also ==
- List of Gospels
- Lost work
- Shakespeare apocrypha
