= Great Sabbath =

Sabbath immediately preceding the Passover

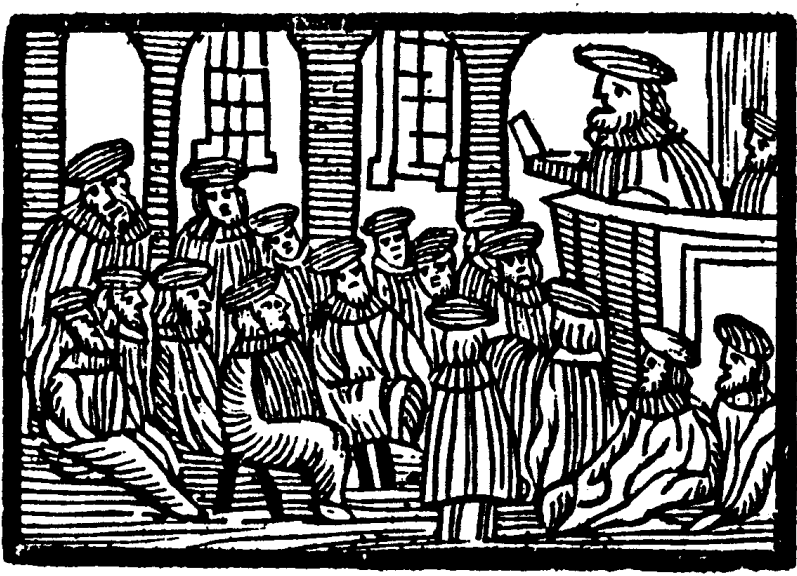
Shabbat haggadol drasha (1729 woodcut)

The Great Sabbath (Hebrew: שבת הגדול, romanized: shabbat haggadol) is the Sabbath immediately preceding the Passover on the night of the 14th of Nisan, named on account of the prophecy from Malachi, traditionally read on this day, which foretells the return of Elijah the prophet to announce the "great and terrible Day of the Lord" It is commemorated in the Christian calendar as Lazarus Saturday.

== Jewish traditions ==
Known as the "Great" or "Big" Sabbath, it is the Sabbath immediately preceding Passover. It is customary for the rabbi to deliver an address to the congregation on this day. In the Eastern Ashkenazic rite, the first half of the haggadah (Passover liturgy) is recited in the afternoon. In the Ashkenazic rite, piyyutim including many Laws of the Seder are recited. In most communities, the Haftarah is taken from the prophet Malachi which foretells the second coming of Elijah the prophet to announce the "great and terrible Day of the Lord". The Babylonian Talmud, citing Exodus 12:42, states, “That was for the Eternal a night of vigil for bringing them out of the land of Egypt; that same night is a night of vigil for all the Israelites throughout their generations.”

A customary greeting in some Sephardic communities is Shabbat haGadol mevorach, ("a blessed Shabbat haGadol').
