= Book of Zephaniah =

Book of the Bible

The Leningrad Codex (AD. 1008) contains the complete text of the Book of Zephaniah in Hebrew.

The Book of Zephaniah /ˌzɛfəˈnaɪ.ə/ (Hebrew: צְפַנְיָה, Ṣəfanyā; sometimes Latinized as Sophonias from Greek: Σοφονίας) is the ninth of the Twelve Minor Prophets of the Old Testament and Tanakh, preceded in all traditions by the Book of Habakkuk and followed by the Book of Haggai. The book has three chapters. Zephaniah is a male given name which is usually interpreted to mean "Yahweh has hidden/protected", or "Yahweh hides". The church father Jerome of Stridon interpreted Zephaniah's name to mean "the watchman of the Lord". The original text of the prophecy was written in Biblical Hebrew.

Scholars propose various dates of composition; some scholars argue that the book was probably composed during the reign of Josiah (late-seventh century BCE), while others hold that an original core of oracles was expanded and edited in exilic or later times.

== Authorship and date ==
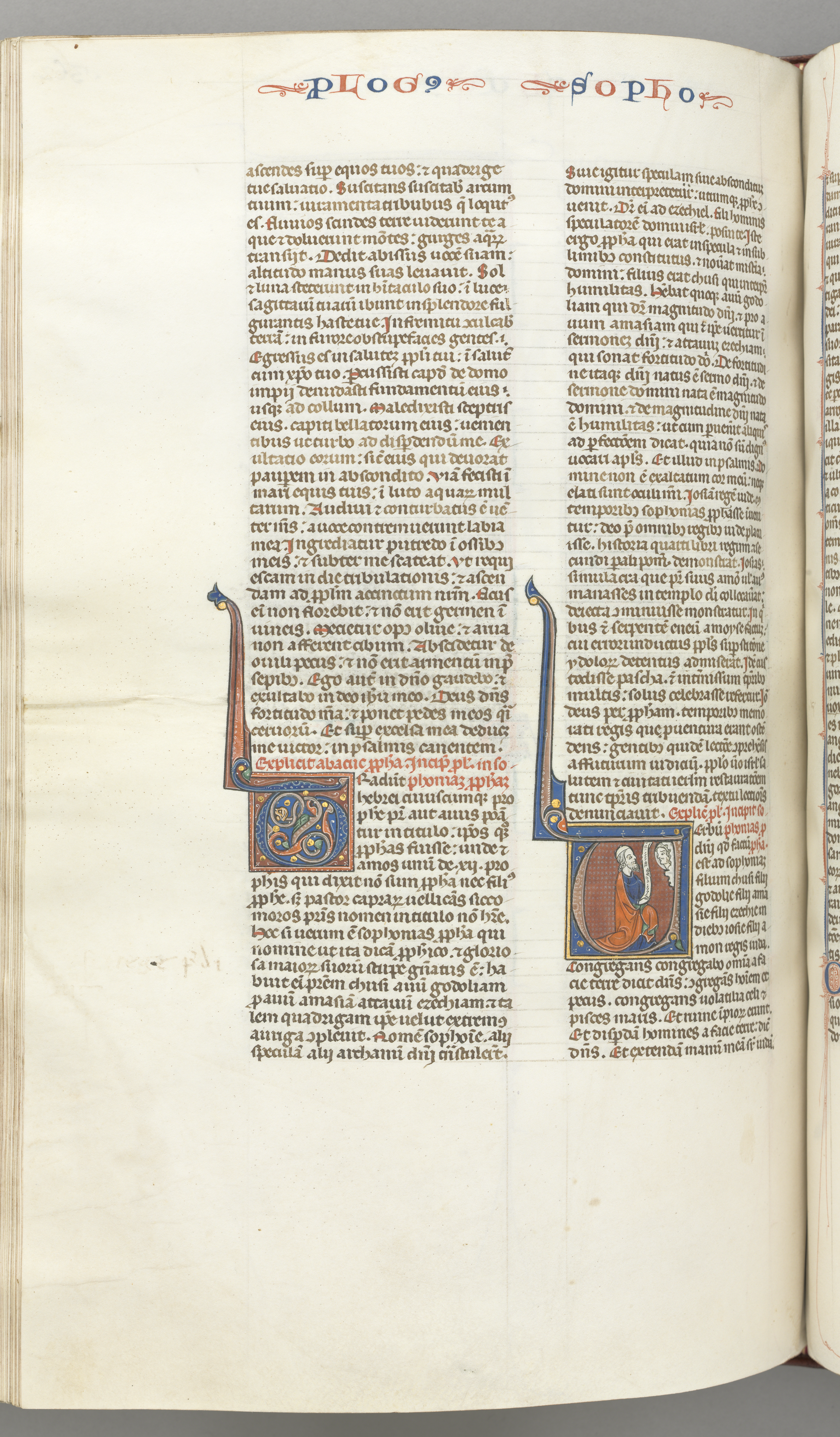
A 13th-century Latin Bible, possibly from Toulouse, with part of the Book of Zephaniah (Latin Sophonias)

The book's superscription attributes its authorship to "Zephaniah son of Cushi son of Gedaliah son of Amariah son of Hezekiah, in the days of King Josiah son of Amon of Judah". All that is known of Zephaniah comes from within the text.

The name "Cushi," Zephaniah's father, means "Cushite" or "Ethiopian", and the text of Zephaniah mentions the sin and restoration of Cushim. While some have concluded from this that Zephaniah was dark-skinned or African, Ehud Ben Zvi maintains that, based on the context, "Cushi" must be understood as a personal name rather than an indicator of nationality. Abraham ibn Ezra interpreted the name Hezekiah in the superscription as King Hezekiah of Judah, though that is not a claim advanced in the text of Zephaniah.

As with many of the other prophets, there is no external evidence to directly associate composition of the book with a prophet by the name of Zephaniah. Some scholars, such as Kent Harold Richards and Jason DeRouchie, consider the words in Zephaniah to reflect a time early in the reign of King Josiah (640–609 BC) before his reforms of 622 BC took full effect, in which case the prophet may have been born during the reign of Manasseh (698/687–642 BC). Others argue that some portion of the book is postmonarchic, that is, dating to later than 586 BC when the Kingdom of Judah fell in the Siege of Jerusalem. Some who consider the book to have largely been written by a historical Zephaniah have suggested that he may have been a disciple of the prophet Isaiah, because of the two books' similar focus on rampant corruption and injustice in Judah. The Jerusalem Bible links Zephaniah 2:11 and 3:9-10 with the Book of Consolation (Isaiah 40-55).

== Purpose ==
If Zephaniah was largely composed during the monarchic period, then its composition was occasioned by Judah's refusal to obey its covenant obligations toward Yahweh despite having seen northern Israel's exile a generation or two previously, an exile which the Judahite literary tradition attributed to Yahweh's anger aroused by Israel's disobedience to the covenant. In this historical context, Zephaniah urges Judah to obedience to Yahweh, saying that "perhaps" he will forgive them if they do.

== Themes ==
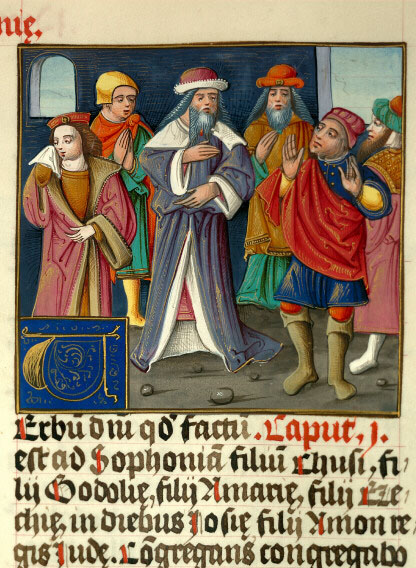
Illustration depicting Zephaniah addressing the people, from a French 16th-century Bible

The HarperCollins Study Bible supplies headings for sections within the book as follows:

Verse and chapter headings in the HCSB
Verse (NRSV)	Heading
1:1	(Superscription)
1:2–13	The Coming Judgment on Judah
1:14–18	The Great Day of the Lord
2:1–15	Judgment on Israel's Enemies
3:1–7	The Wickedness of Jerusalem
3:8–13	Punishment and Conversion of the Nations
3:14–20	Song of Joy

More consistently than any other prophetic book, Zephaniah focuses on "the day of the Lord", developing this tradition from its first appearance in Amos. The day of the Lord tradition also appears in Isaiah, Ezekiel, Obadiah, Joel, and Malachi.

The book begins by describing Yahweh's judgement. With a triple repetition of "I will sweep away" in Zephaniah 1:2–3, Zephaniah emphasizes the totality of the destruction, as the number three often signifies perfection in the Bible. The order of creatures in Zephaniah 1:2 ("humans and animals ... the birds ... the fish") is the opposite of the creation order in Genesis 1:1–28, signifying an undoing of creation. This is also signified by the way that "from the face of the earth" forms an inclusio around Zephaniah 1:2-3, hearkening back to how the phrase is used in the Genesis flood narrative in Genesis 6:7, Genesis 7:4, and Genesis 8:8, where it also connotes an undoing of creation.

As is common in prophetic literature in the Bible, a "remnant" survives Yahweh's judgement, by humbly seeking refuge in Yahweh. The book concludes with an announcement of hope and joy, as Yahweh "bursts forth in joyful divine celebration" over his people.

== Later influence ==
Because of its hopeful tone of the gathering and restoration of exiles, Zephaniah 3:20 has been included in Jewish liturgy.

Zephaniah served as a major inspiration for the medieval Catholic hymn "Dies Irae," whose title and opening words are from the Vulgate translation of Zephaniah 1:15–16.

== Surviving early manuscripts ==
The original manuscript of this book has been lost. Some early manuscripts containing the text of this book in Hebrew are of the Masoretic Text tradition, which includes the Codex Cairensis (895), the Petersburg Codex of the Prophets (916), Aleppo Codex (10th century), Codex Leningradensis (1008). Fragments containing parts of this book in Hebrew were found among the Dead Sea Scrolls, including 4Q77 (4QXII^{b}; 150–125 BCE), 4Q78 (4QXII^{c}; 75–50 BCE), and Wadi Murabba'at Minor Prophets (Mur88; MurXIIProph; 75-100 CE).

There is also a translation into Koine Greek known as the Septuagint, made in the last few centuries BC. Extant ancient manuscripts of the Septuagint version include Codex Vaticanus (4th century), Codex Sinaiticus (4th century), Codex Alexandrinus (5th century) and Codex Marchalianus (6th century). Some fragments containing parts of the Septuagint version of this book were found among the Dead Sea Scrolls, i.e., Naḥal Ḥever (1st century CE).

== Sources ==
- Attridge, Harold W.; Meeks, Wayne A., eds. (2006). The Harper Collins Study Bible (rev. ed.). New York: Harper Collins. ISBN 978-0-06122840-7.
- Berlin, Adele; Brettler, Marc Zvi; Fishbane, Michael, eds. (2004). The Jewish Study Bible. New York: Oxford University Press. ISBN 978-0-19529751-5.
- Carson, D. A.; Hess, Richard S.; Alexander, T. D.; Moo, Douglas J.; Naselli, Andrew David, eds. (2015). NIV Zondervan Study Bible. Grand Rapids: Zondervan. ISBN 978-0-31043833-5.
- Grudem, Wayne; Dennis, Lane T.; Packer, J. I.; Collins, C. John; Schreiner, Thomas R.; Taylor, Justin, eds. (2008). ESV Study Bible. Wheaton: Crossway. ISBN 978-1-43350241-5.
- Fitzmyer, Joseph A. (2008). A Guide to the Dead Sea Scrolls and Related Literature. Grand Rapids, MI: William B. Eerdmans Publishing Company. ISBN 9780802862419.
- Ulrich, Eugene, ed. (2010). The Biblical Qumran Scrolls: Transcriptions and Textual Variants. Brill.
- Würthwein, Ernst (1995). The Text of the Old Testament. Translated by Rhodes, Erroll F. Grand Rapids, MI: Wm. B. Eerdmans. ISBN 0-8028-0788-7.

Book of Zephaniah Minor prophets
Preceded by Habakkuk	Hebrew Bible	Succeeded by Haggai
Preceded by Habakkuk	Christian; Old Testament	Succeeded by Haggai
