= Literary prophets =

Certain prophets of the Hebrew Bible

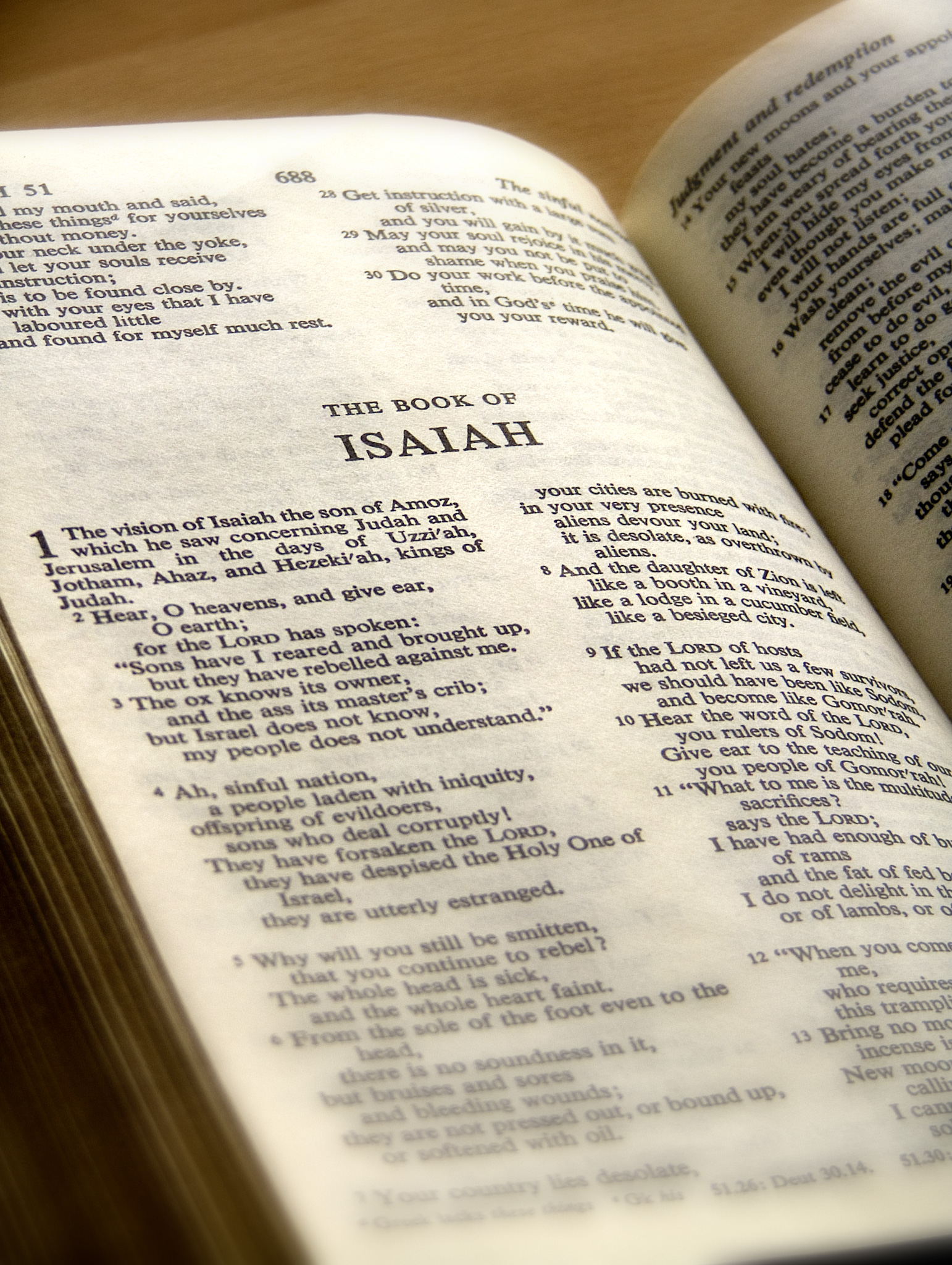
The Book of Isaiah

The literary prophets is a name given to the Biblical figures who wrote down their prophecies and personal histories, rather than histories of the Israelites. By extension, the term is also sometimes used to refer to their writings, which mostly appear in the form of biblical poetry. In Judaism, the equivalent term Latter Prophets (Nevi'im Aharonim – נביאים אחרונים in Hebrew) is often used.

The majority of the writing of the literary prophets is self-attributed to just three individuals – Isaiah (the Book of Isaiah), Jeremiah (the Book of Jeremiah), and Ezekiel (the Book of Ezekiel). Textual scholars believe that these books were not written by their named authors. In particular, scholars believe that at least three authors wrote the Book of Isaiah, Deutero-Isaiah being one of the other contributors. The remaining literary prophets are traditionally known as the Minor Prophets, due to the size of their contributions.

== See also ==
- Former Prophets
