= Book of Obadiah =

Book of the Bible of the Assyrian Period

The Book of Obadiah is a book of the Bible whose authorship is attributed to Obadiah. Obadiah is one of the Twelve Minor Prophets in the final section of Nevi'im, the second main division of the Hebrew Bible. The text consists of a single chapter, divided into 21 verses with 440 Hebrew words, making it the shortest book in the Tanakh (The Hebrew Bible), though there are three shorter New Testament epistles in Greek (Philemon with 335 words, 2 John with 245 words, and 3 John with 219 words). The Book of Obadiah is a prophecy concerning the divine judgment of Edom and the restoration of Israel.

The majority of scholars date the Book of Obadiah to shortly after the fall of Jerusalem in 587 BCE. Other scholars hold that the book was shaped by the conflicts between Yehud and the Edomites in the fifth and fourth centuries BCE and evolved through a process of redaction.

== Content ==
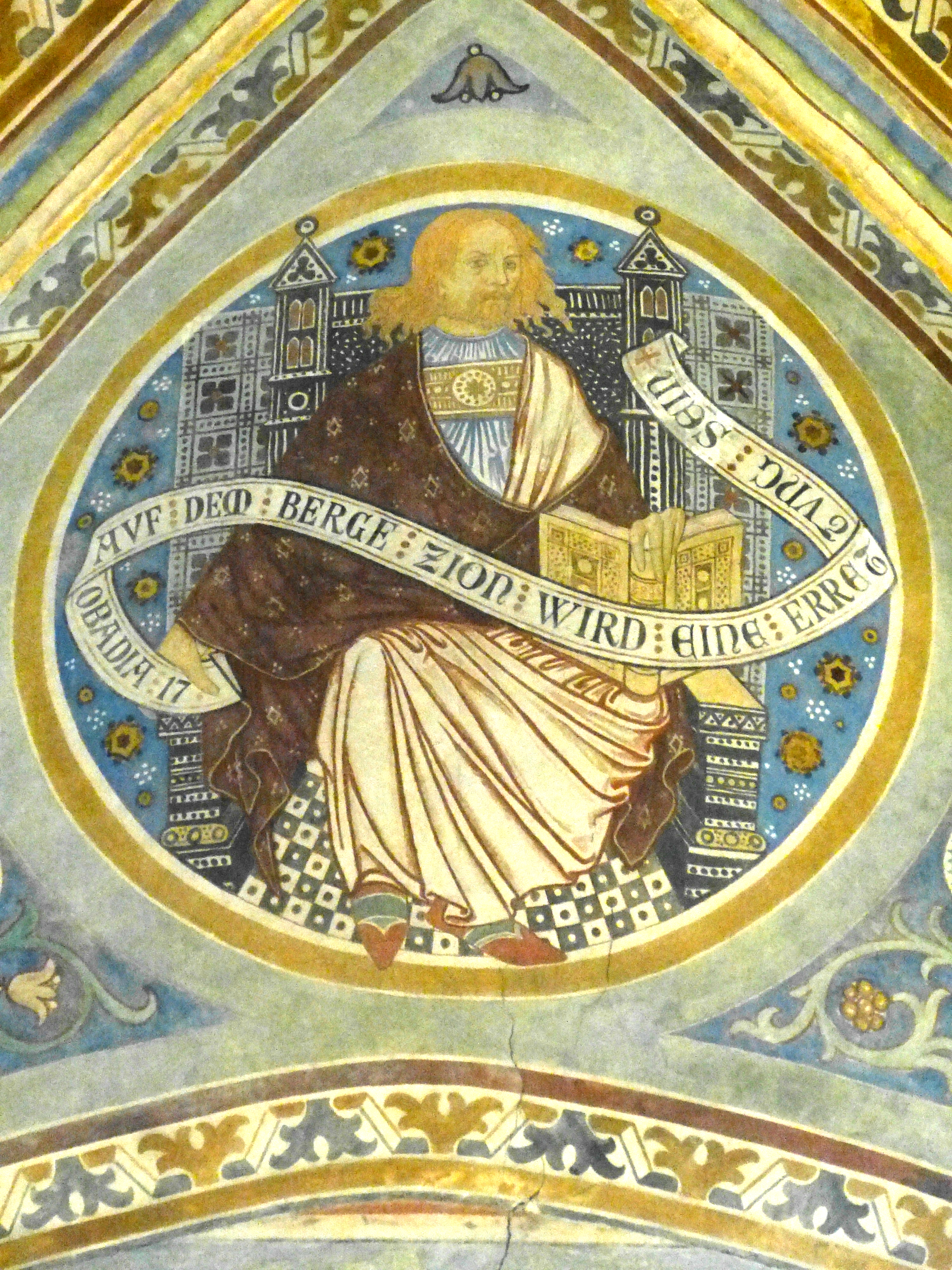
Fresco from St Mary's Church, Bergen, with a quote from Obadiah 17: "Upon Mount Zion there will be deliverance."

The Book of Obadiah is based on a prophetic vision concerning the fall of Edom, a mountain-dwelling nation whose founding father was Esau. Obadiah describes an encounter with Yahweh, who addresses Edom's arrogance and charges them for their "violence against your brother Jacob".

Throughout most of the history of Judah, Edom was controlled absolutely from Jerusalem as a vassal state. Obadiah said that the high elevation of their dwelling place in the mountains of Seir had gone to their head, and they had puffed themselves up in pride. "'Though you soar like the eagle and make your nest among the stars, from there I will bring you down,' declares the LORD".

In the Siege of Jerusalem (597 BC), Nebuchadnezzar II sacked Jerusalem, carted away the King of Judah, and installed a puppet ruler. The Edomites helped the Babylonians loot the city. Obadiah, writing this prophecy around 590 BC, suggests the Edomites should have remembered that blood was thicker than water. "On the day you stood aloof while strangers carried off his wealth and foreigners entered his gates and cast lots for Jerusalem, you were like one of them... You should not march through the gates of my people in the day of their disaster, nor gloat over them in their calamity in the day of their disaster, nor seize their wealth in the day of their disaster."

Obadiah said in judgment that Yahweh would wipe out the house of Esau forever, and not even a remnant would remain. The Edomites' land would be possessed by the lands of the south and they would cease to exist as a people. The Day of the Lord was at hand for all nations, and one day, the children of Israel would return victorious from their exile and possess the land of Edom, the fields of Ephraim, the land of Gilead, the lowland of Philistia, and the fields of Samaria.

== Scholarly issues ==
=== Dating Obadiah ===
The date of composition is disputed and is difficult to determine due to the lack of personal information about Obadiah, his family, and his historical milieu. The date must therefore be determined based on the prophecy itself. Edom is to be destroyed due to its lack of defense for its brother nation, Israel, when it was under attack. There are two major historical contexts within which the Edomites could have committed such an act. These are during 853–841 BCE when Jerusalem was invaded by Philistines during the reign of Jehoram of Judah (recorded in 2 Kings 8:20–22 and 2 Chronicles 21:8–20 or 605–587 BCE when Jerusalem was attacked by Nebuchadnezzar II of Babylon, which led to the Babylonian exile of Israel.

The earlier period would place Obadiah as a contemporary of the prophet Elijah. The later date would place Obadiah as a contemporary of the prophet Jeremiah. A sixth-century date for Obadiah is a "near consensus" position among scholars. Obadiah 1–9 contains parallels to Jeremiah 49:7–22. The passage in the Book of Jeremiah dates from the fourth year of the reign of Jehoiakim (605 BCE), and therefore Obadiah 11–14 seems to refer to the destruction of Jerusalem by Nebuchadnezzar II (587 BCE). It is more likely that Obadiah and the Book of Jeremiah together were drawing on a common source presently unknown to us rather than Jeremiah drawing on previous writings of Obadiah as his source. There is also much material found in Obadiah 10–21 which Jeremiah does not quote, and which, had he had it laid out before him, would have suited his purpose admirably.

== Scriptural parallels ==
The exact expression "the Day of the Lord", from Obadiah 15, has been used by other authors throughout the Old and New Testaments, as follows:

=== Old Testament ===
- Isaiah 2, 13, 34, 58, Jeremiah 46:10, Lamentations 2:22, Ezekiel 13:5, Joel 1, 2, 3, Amos 5:18, 5:20, Zephaniah 1, 2, Zechariah 14:1, Malachi 4:5

=== New Testament ===
- 1 Thessalonians 5:2, 2 Peter 3:10, Acts 2:20, 1 Corinthians 5:5, 2 Corinthians 1:14

For other parallels, compare Obadiah 1:1–8 with Jeremiah 49:7–16.

== See also ==
- Teman, mentioned in verse 9

Book of Obadiah Minor prophets
Preceded by Amos	Hebrew Bible	Succeeded by Jonah
Preceded by Amos	Christian; Old Testament	Succeeded by Jonah
