= Twelve Minor Prophets =

Book or collection of books in the Bible

The Twelve Minor Prophets (Hebrew: שנים עשר and Imperial Aramaic: תרי עשר "Twelve"; Koine Greek: δωδεκαπρόφητον, lit. 'Twelve Prophets'; Latin: Duodecim prophetae, lit. 'Twelve Prophet'), or the Book of the Twelve, is a collection of prophetic books written between about the 8th and 4th centuries BCE that appear in both the Hebrew Bible and the Christian Old Testament.

In the Hebrew Bible, they appear as a single book, "The Twelve", which is the last book of the Nevi'im, the second of its three major divisions. In the Old Testament, the collection appears as twelve individual books of the Bible, one for each of the prophets: the Book of Hosea, Joel, Amos, Obadiah, Jonah, Micah, Nahum, Habakkuk, Zephaniah, Haggai, Zechariah, and Malachi. Their order, and position in the Old Testament, varies slightly between the Protestant, Catholic and Eastern Orthodox Bibles.

The name "Minor Prophets" goes back to Augustine of Hippo, who distinguished the 12 shorter prophetic books as prophetae minores from the four longer books of the prophets Isaiah, Jeremiah, Ezekiel, and Daniel.

Scholars generally believe that each Book of the Twelve Prophets has an original core of prophetic tradition attributed to the respective figure it's named after, containing autobiographical, biographical, and oracular material. The Twelve were likely collected into a single scroll by the time of the Achaemenid Empire, with the order possibly reflecting both chronological and thematic considerations, although some debate exists over dating and sequence.

== Composition ==
A high resolution scan of the Aleppo Codex containing parts of the Book of the Twelve Minor Prophets (the eighth book in Nevi'im), from 10th century.

=== Individual books ===
Scholars usually assume that there exists an original core of prophetic tradition behind each book which can be attributed to the figure after whom it is named. In general, each book includes three types of material:

- Autobiographical material in the first person, some of which may go back to the prophet in question;
- Biographical materials about the prophet in the third person – which incidentally demonstrate that the collection and editing of the books was completed by persons other than the prophets themselves;
- Oracles or speeches by the prophets, usually in poetic form, and drawing on a wide variety of genres, including covenant lawsuit, oracles against the nations, judgment oracles, messenger speeches, songs, hymns, narrative, lament, law, proverb, symbolic gesture, prayer, wisdom saying, and vision.

The noteworthy exception is the Book of Jonah, an anonymous work which contains a narrative about the prophet Jonah.

=== As a collection ===
It is not known when these short works were collected and transferred to a single scroll, but the first extra-biblical evidence for the Twelve as a collection is c. 190 BCE in Ben Sira, and evidence from the Dead Sea Scrolls suggests that the modern order of the Hebrew Bible, which would potentially include the twelve, had been established by 150 BCE. It is believed that initially the first six were collected, and later the second six were added; the two groups seem to complement each other, with Hosea through Micah raising the question of iniquity, and Nahum through Malachi proposing resolutions.

Many, though not all, modern scholars agree that the editing process which produced the Book of the Twelve reached its final form in Jerusalem during the Achaemenid period (538–332 BCE), although there is disagreement over whether this was early or late.

The comparison of different ancient manuscripts indicates that the order of the individual books was originally fluid. The arrangement found in current Bibles is roughly chronological. First come those prophets dated to the early Neo-Assyrian period: Hosea, Amos, Obadiah, Jonah, and Micah; Joel is undated, but it was possibly placed before Amos because parts of a verse near the end of Joel 4.16 and one near the beginning of Amos 1.2 are identical. Also we can find in both Amos (4.9 and 7.1–3) and Joel a description of a plague of locusts. These are followed by prophets that are set in the later Assyrian period: Nahum, Habakkuk, and Zephaniah. Last come those set in the Achaemenid period: Haggai, Zechariah, and Malachi, although some scholars date "Second Zechariah" to the Hellenistic Era. Chronology was not the only consideration, as "It seems that an emphatic focus on Jerusalem and Judah was [also] a main concern. For example, Obadiah is generally understood as reflecting the destruction of Jerusalem in 587 BCE, and would therefore fit later in a purely chronological sequence.

=== Sequence of books ===
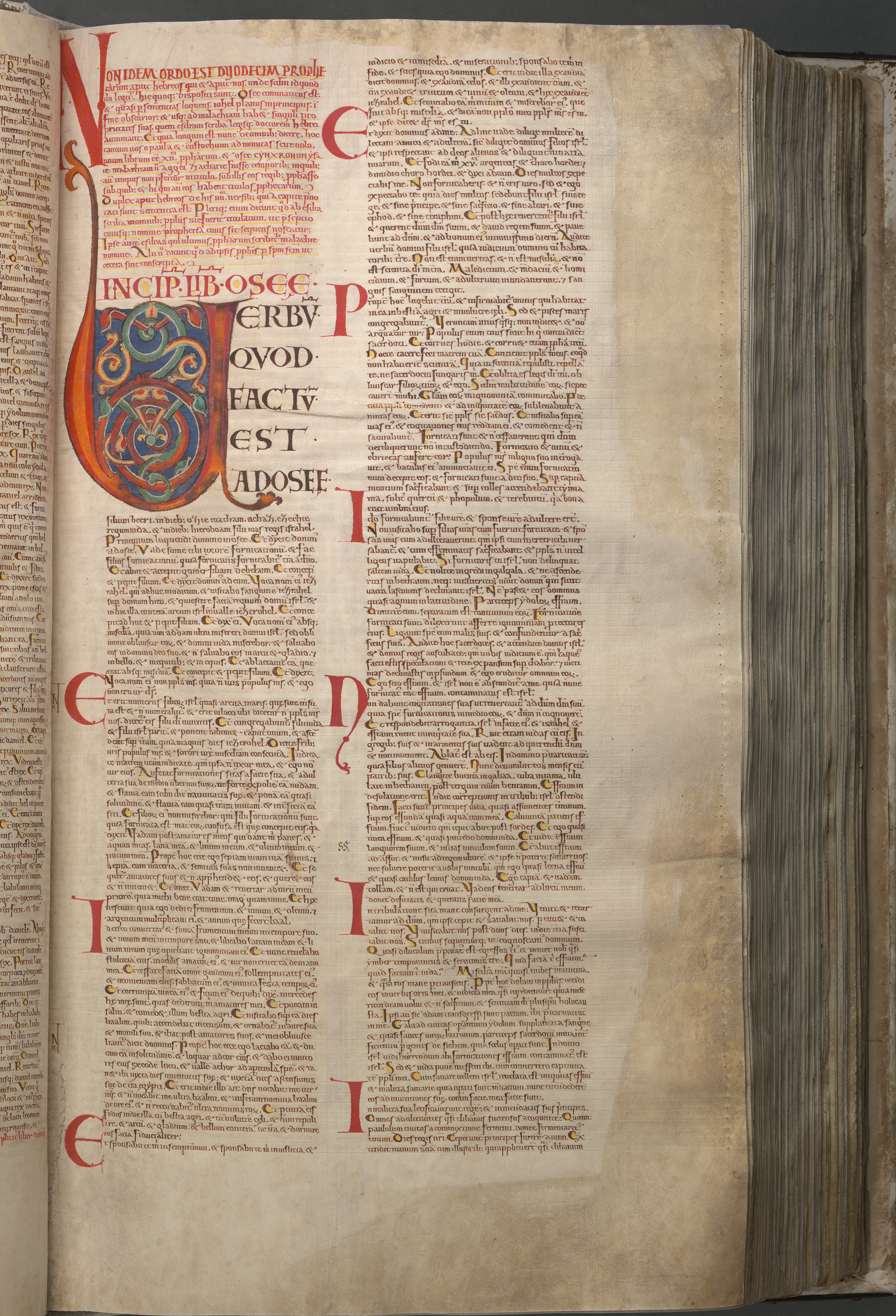
The first part of the book of Twelve Minor Prophets (the first book is the Book of Hosea) in the Codex Gigas, the largest extant medieval manuscript in the world, from 13th century. Now at the National Library of Sweden in Stockholm.

In the Hebrew Bible, these works are counted as one anthology. The works appear in the same order in Jewish, Protestant and Catholic Bibles, but in Eastern Orthodox Christian Bibles they are ordered according to the Septuagint. The books are in rough chronological order, according to explicit statements within the books themselves.

The twelve books are:

Order	Orthodox order	Book	Traditional date
1	1	Hosea (Osee)	8th century BCE (before the fall of the Northern Kingdom)
2	4	Joel	uncertain
3	2	Amos	8th century BCE (before the fall of the Northern Kingdom)
4	5	Obadiah (Abdias)	uncertain (9th century or 6th century BCE)
5	6	Jonah (Jonas)	uncertain (8th century BCE or post-exilic period)
6	3	Micah (Micheas)	8th century BCE (before the fall of the Northern Kingdom)
7	7	Nahum (Naum)	7th century BCE (before the fall of the Southern Kingdom)
8	8	Habakkuk (Habacuc)	7th century BCE (before the fall of the Southern Kingdom)
9	9	Zephaniah (Sophanias)	7th century BCE (before the fall of the Southern Kingdom)
10	10	Haggai (Aggeus)	6th century BCE (after return from exile)
11	11	Zechariah (Zacharias)	6th century BCE (after return from exile)
12	12	Malachi (Malachias)	5th century BCE (after return from exile)

=== Academic debates ===
In the 21st century, "claims for Persian period influence or origins have ballooned."

In the recent Oxford Handbook of the Minor Prophets, Jason Radine summarizes the ongoing "Persian Turn" in Minor Prophets scholarship. It refers to a scholarly trend towards dating much of the biblical composition and editing of the Minor Prophets to the Persian period (539–323 BCE). This trend is rooted in earlier scholarly theories, such as the Graf-Wellhausen Hypothesis, which suggested that elements of the Pentateuch, particularly the "Priestly" writings, originated during the Persian era. Additionally, Spinoza’s 17th-century argument that Ezra authored large portions of the Hebrew Bible influenced this perspective.

This trend has gained momentum as a growing number of scholars now posit that many prophetic books, once assumed to date from earlier periods, were likely finalized or significantly edited during the Persian period. Researchers like Reinhard Kratz distinguish between the original oracles of ancient Near Eastern prophets and the later literary works attributed to them, which reflect the scribal efforts of later editors.

This theory has been opposed by other scholars, however. For instance, Heath Dewrell argues that many literary features of the Book of Hosea are also attested in Neo-Assyrian prophecies. Since these prophetic texts were written close to the time of Hosea and were not substantially edited centuries after their authors' time, Dewrell finds no reason to think that the biblical book underwent any major editing either.

While dating texts from the Persian period is appropriate for books like Haggai and Zechariah, which explicitly mention that era, scholars caution against oversimplifying the dating process. Radine argues that categorizing too much biblical material as Persian-era production risks obscuring the complex, long-term development of biblical literature. In particular, the diversity of themes, literary styles, and theological perspectives in the Minor Prophets suggests that their formation spanned a much longer period than the Persian era alone.

The scholar Ehud Ben Zvi suggests that much of the biblical material from the Persian period was produced within the relatively small and interconnected community of Jerusalem, where scribes were likely aware of each other’s works. This view emphasizes the importance of understanding how these texts were shaped within their historical and cultural contexts. However, Radine argues that this approach risks overlooking earlier material that predated the Persian period but was later edited or integrated into these texts.

== Christian commemoration ==
In the Roman Catholic Church, the twelve minor prophets are read in the Tridentine Breviary during the fourth and fifth weeks of November, which are the last two weeks of the liturgical year, before Advent.

In Year 1 of the modern Lectionary, Haggai, Zechariah, Jonah, Malachi, and Joel are read in weeks 25–27 of Ordinary Time. In Year 2, Amos, Hosea, and Micah are read in weeks 14–16 of Ordinary Time. In Year 1 of the two-year cycle of the Office of Readings in the Liturgy of the Hours, Micah 4 and 7 are read in the third week of Advent; Amos, Hosea, Micah, Zephaniah, Nahum, and Habakkuk are read in weeks 22–29 of Ordinary Time. In Year 2, Haggai and Zechariah 1–8 are read in weeks 11–12 of Ordinary Time; Obadiah, Joel, Malachi, Jonah, and Zechariah 9–14 are read in Week 18.

They are collectively commemorated in the Calendar of Saints of the Armenian Apostolic Church on July 31.

== See also ==
- Biblical prophecy
- Books of the Bible
- Greek Minor Prophets Scroll from Nahal Hever
- List of Biblical prophets
- Prophet

Preceded by Ezekiel	Hebrew Bible	Followed by Psalms
Preceded by Daniel	Christian Old Testament	End of Old Testament; New Testament begins with Matthew
