= Book of Joel =

Book of the Bible

The Book of Joel (Hebrew: ספר יוֹאֵל Sefer Yo'él) is a Jewish prophetic text containing a series of "divine announcements". The first line attributes authorship to "Joel the son of Pethuel". It forms part of the Book of the twelve minor prophets or the Nevi'im ("Prophets") in the Hebrew Bible, and is a book in its own right in the Christian Old Testament where it has three chapters. In the New Testament, his prophecy of the outpouring of God's Holy Spirit upon all people was notably quoted by Saint Peter in his Pentecost sermon.

The Book of Joel's frequent allusions to earlier Hebrew Bible texts and signs of literary development suggest a late origin and its potential to have been a unifying piece within the prophetic canon.

== Surviving early manuscripts ==
Leningrad Codex (1008 CE) contains the complete copy of Book of Joel in Hebrew.

The original text was written in Hebrew.

Some early manuscripts containing the text of this book in Hebrew are of the Masoretic Text tradition, which includes the Codex Cairensis (895 CE), the Petersburg Codex of the Prophets (916), Aleppo Codex (10th century), Codex Leningradensis (1008). Fragments containing parts of this book in Hebrew were found among the Dead Sea Scrolls, including 4Q78 (4QXII^{c}; 75–50 BCE) with extant verses 1:10–20, 2:1, 2:8–23, and 3:6–21; and 4Q82 (4QXII^{g}; 25 BCE) with extant verses 1:12–14, 2:2–13, 3:4–9, 3:11–14, 3:17, 3:19–2; Schøyen MS 4612/1 (DSS F.117; DSS F.Joel1; 50–68 CE) with extant verses 3:1–4); and Wadi Murabba'at Minor Prophets (Mur88; MurXIIProph; 75–100 CE) with extant verses 2:20, 2:26–27, 2:28–32, and 3:1–16.

Ancient manuscripts in Koine Greek containing this book are mainly of the Septuagint version, including Codex Vaticanus (B; $\mathfrak{G}$^{B}; 4th century), Codex Sinaiticus (S; BHK: $\mathfrak{G}$^{S}; 4th century), Codex Alexandrinus (A; $\mathfrak{G}$^{A}; 5th century) and Codex Marchalianus (Q; $\mathfrak{G}$^{Q}; 6th century).

== Content ==
After the initial attribution, the book may be broken down into the following sections:

- Lament over a great locust plague and a severe drought (1:1–2:17).
  - The effects of these events on agriculture, farmers, and on the supply of agricultural offerings for the Temple in Jerusalem, interspersed with a call to national lament (1:1–20).
  - A more apocalyptic passage comparing the locusts to an army, and revealing that they are God's army (2:1–11).
  - A call to national repentance in the face of God's judgment (2:12–17).
- Promise of future blessings (2:18–32 or 2:18–3:5).
  - Banishment of the locusts and restoration of agricultural productivity as a divine response to national penitence (2:18–27).
  - Future prophetic gifts to all of God's people, and the safety of God's people in the face of cosmic cataclysm (2:28–32 or 3:1–5).
- Coming judgment on the Kingdom of Judah's enemies: the Philistines, the Kingdom of Edom, and the Kingdom of Egypt (3:1–21 or 4:1–21).

== Chapters ==
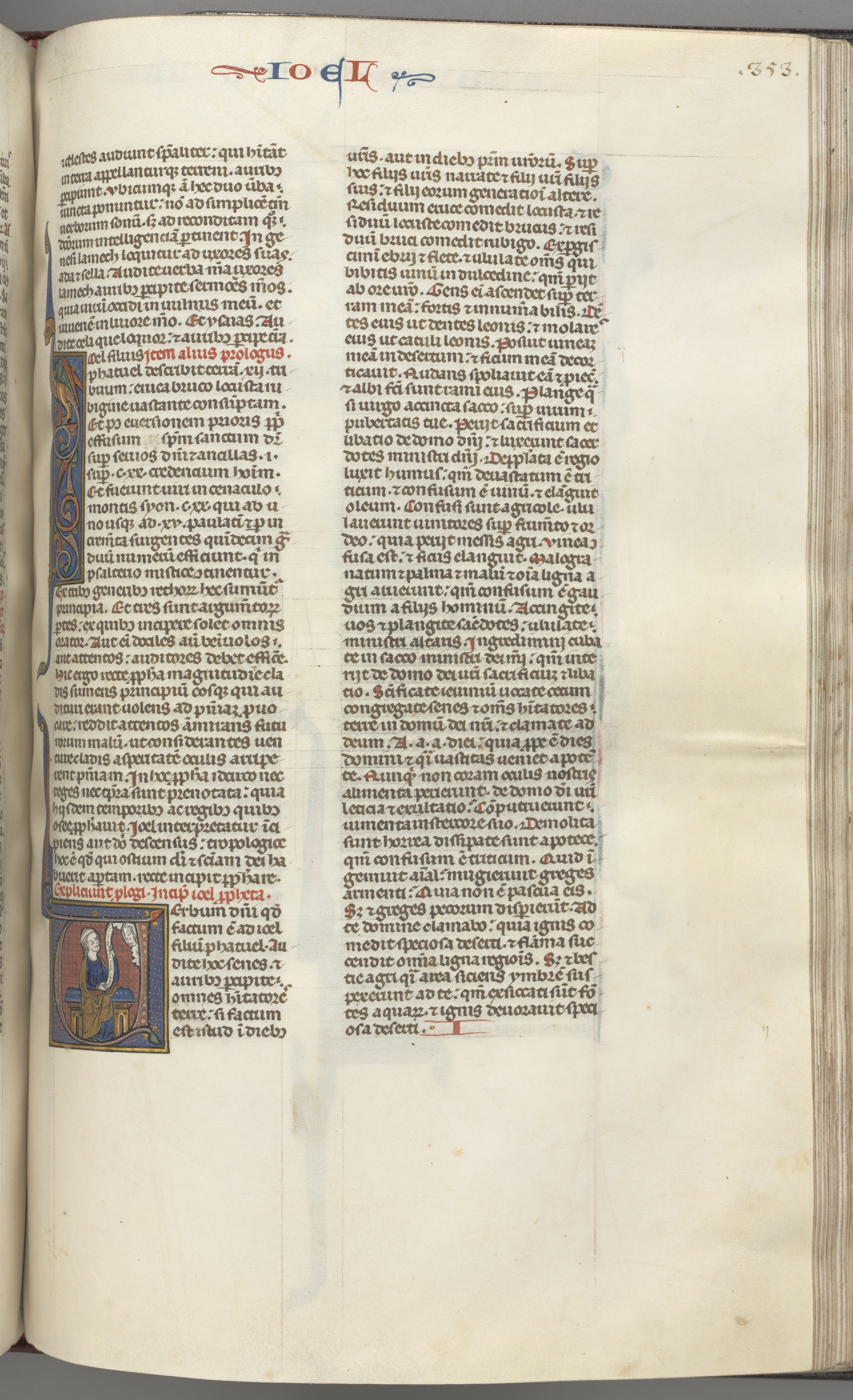
Book of Joel in Latin translation in a French manuscript of the 13th century

The Book of Joel's division into chapters and verses differs widely between editions of the Bible; some editions have three chapters, others four. Translations with four chapters include the Jewish Publication Society's version of the Hebrew Bible (1917), the Jerusalem Bible (1966), New American Bible (Revised Edition, 1970), Complete Jewish Bible (1998), and Tree of Life Version (2015).

In the 1611 King James Bible, the Book of Joel consists of three chapters: the second one has 32 verses, and it is equivalent to the union of the chapter 2 (with 27 verses) and chapter 3 (with 5 verses) of other editions of the Bible.

The differences of the divisions are as follows:

English/Greek	Hebrew
Joel 1	Joel 1
Joel 2:1–27	Joel 2
Joel 2:28–32	Joel 3
Joel 3	Joel 4

== Date ==
As there are no explicit references in the book to datable persons or events, scholars have assigned a wide range of dates to the book. The main positions are:

- Ninth century BCE, particularly in the reign of Joash – a position especially popular among nineteenth-century scholars (making Joel one of the earliest writing prophets). The enemies mentioned – Philistines, Phoenicians, Egypt and Edom – are consistent with this date. The lack of mention of the Assyrians or Babylonians, who were the main enemies of Judah during the eighth, seventh and sixth centuries, leads many conservative scholars to suggest the choice is between this date, and a fourth century date.
- Early eighth century BCE, during the reign of Uzziah (contemporary with Hosea, Amos, and Jonah)
- c. 630–587 BCE, in the last decades of the kingdom of Judah (contemporary with Jeremiah, Ezekiel, Habakkuk)
- c. 520–500 BCE, contemporary with the return of the exiles and the careers of Zechariah and Haggai.
- The decades around 400 BCE, during the Persian period (making him one of the latest writing prophets), or around 350 BCE. This is supported by the apparent mention of the 587 BCE destruction of Jerusalem as a past event in 3:1 and 3:17, and the mention of Greeks in 3:6.
- Some scholars argue that further additions to Joel took place during the Ptolemaic period (c. 301–201 BCE) due to its use of earlier texts and what they perceive to be a "late" perspective on Yahweh and the nations.

Evidence produced for these positions includes allusions in the book to the wider world, similarities with other prophets, and linguistic details. Some commentators, such as John Calvin, attach no great importance to the precise dating.

== History of interpretation ==
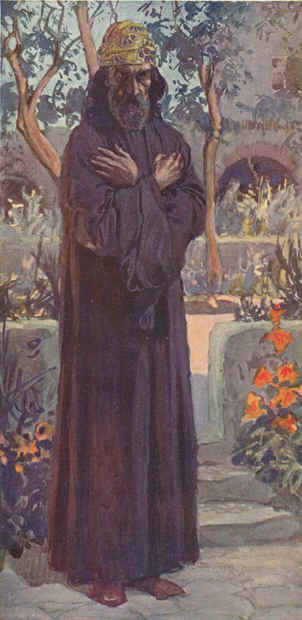
Joel (watercolor circa 1896–1902 by James Tissot)

The Masoretic Text places Joel between Hosea and Amos (the order inherited by the Tanakh and Old Testament), while the Septuagint order is Hosea–Amos–Micah–Joel–Obadiah–Jonah. The Hebrew text of Joel seems to have suffered little from scribal transmission, but is at a few points supplemented by the Septuagint, Syriac, and Vulgate versions, or by conjectural emendation. While the book purports to describe a plague of locusts, some ancient Jewish opinion saw the locusts as allegorical interpretations of Israel's enemies. This allegorical interpretation was applied to the church by many Church Fathers. Calvin took a literal interpretation of chapter 1, but allegorical view of chapter 2, a position echoed by some modern interpreters. Most modern interpreters, however, see Joel speaking of a literal locust plague given a prophetic or apocalyptic interpretation.

The traditional ascription of the whole book to the prophet Joel was challenged in the late nineteenth and early twentieth centuries by a theory of a three-stage process of composition: 1:1–2:27 were from the hand of Joel, and dealt with a contemporary issue; 2:28–3:21/3:1–4:21 were ascribed to a continuator with an apocalyptic outlook. Mentions in the first half of the book to the day of the Lord were also ascribed to this continuator. 3:4–8/4:4–8 could be seen as even later. Details of exact ascriptions differed between scholars.

This splitting of the book's composition began to be challenged in the mid-twentieth century, with scholars defending the unity of the book, the plausibility of the prophet combining a contemporary and apocalyptic outlook, and later additions by the prophet. The authenticity of 3:4–8 has presented more challenges, although a number of scholars still defend it.

== Biblical quotes and allusions ==
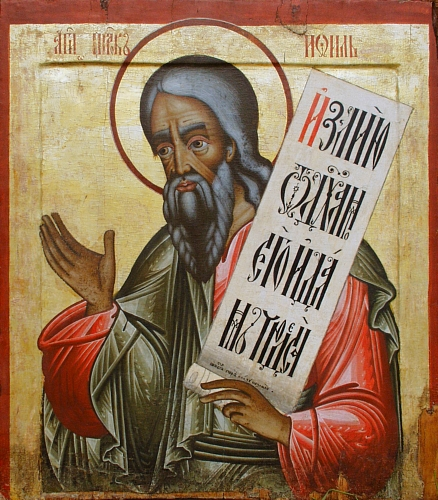
Russian icon of the prophet Joel (Iconostasis of Kizhi monastery, c. 1700–1725)

There are many parallels of language between Joel and other Old Testament prophets. They may represent Joel's literary use of other prophets, or vice versa.

In the New Testament, his prophecy of the outpouring of God's Holy Spirit upon all people was notably quoted by Saint Peter in his Pentecost sermon.

Joel 3:10 / 4:10 is a variation of Isaiah 2:4 and Micah 4:3's prophecy, "They will beat their swords into plowshares and their spears into pruning hooks", instead commanding, "Beat your plowshares into swords and your pruning hooks into spears."

The table below represents some of the more explicit quotes and allusions between specific passages in Joel and passages from the Old and New Testaments.

Joel	Old Testament	New Testament
1:6, 2:2–10		Revelation 9:3, 7–9
1:15	Isaiah 13:6; Ezekiel 30:2–3	
2:1	Zephaniah 1:14–16	
2:1–2	Amos 5:18, 20	
2:11	Malachi 3:2	
2:14	Jonah 3:9	
2:20–21	Psalm 126:2–3	
2:27	Isaiah 45:5; Ezekiel 36:11	
2:28–32/3:1–5		Acts 2:16–21
2:31/3:4	Malachi 3:23/4:5	
2:32/3:5	Obadiah 17	Romans 10:13
3:1/4:1	Psalm 126:1	
3:10/4:10	Isaiah 2:4; Micah 4:3	
3:16/4:16	Amos 1:2	
3:17/4:17	Obadiah 17	
3:18/4:18	Amos 9:13	

== Liturgical usage ==
Plange quasi virgo (Lament like a virgin), the third responsory for Holy Saturday, is loosely based on verses from the Book of Joel: the title comes from Joel 1:8.

== See also ==
- Joel 2:25 International

Book of Joel Minor prophets
Preceded by Hosea	Hebrew Bible	Succeeded by Amos
Preceded by Hosea	Christian; Old Testament	Succeeded by Amos
