= Anna Seidel =

German Sinologist

Anna Katharina Seidel (1938 – September 29, 1991) was a German Sinologist who was regarded as an authority in the study of Taoism. During her 22 years at the Institut du Hobogirin of the Ecole Francaise d’Extreme-Orient in Kyoto, Seidel had become the centre of gravity for the many Western scholars of East Asian studies who ventured to the ancient Japanese capital to conduct research.

== Early years ==
The youngest of three children, Seidel was born in Berlin, Germany, but spent most of her childhood in the southern city of Munich. During the Nazi era, her father, who was an aviation engineer, stood by her mother, who was descendant of a distinguished German-Jewish family; they illegally sheltered a Jewish friend at their home throughout the Second World War, risking a death penalty. Seidel's parents encouraged her to pursue intellectual interests from an early age. Having been trained in the fundamentals of Sinology at the Ludwig-Maximilians-Universität München from 1958 to 1960 and the University of Hamburg in 1961, Seidel specialised in the study of Chinese religions in Paris, where she studied under two eminent expatriates, Austrian Maxime Kaltenmark and German Rolf A. Stein from 1961 to 1968. Her doctoral dissertation, La divinisation de Lao-tseu dans le taoisme des Han is regarded as a groundbreaking study in the field. In 1969, Seidel was elected into membership of the Ecole Francaise d'Extreme-Orient and despatched to Kyoto, the ancient capital of Japan, where she lived until her death.

== Research ==
Here her work was centered upon the compilation of the Hobogirin, a multivolume encyclopedic dictionary of Buddhism. She simultaneously had the opportunity to continue her own research on Taoism, becoming one of the world's leading experts in this subject. After a brief marriage to the Bostonian scholar Holmes Welch, with whom she co-edited Facets of Taoism (1979), Seidel devoted her life completely to her scholarship and to the Hobogirin Institute.

In 1978, she taught Chinese religion as a visiting professor at the University of Hawaiʻi and at the University of California, Santa Barbara in 1988; she repeatedly rejected lucrative offers from eminent American universities. In 1985, she started the bilingual journal Cahiers d'Extreme-Asie, which has since become established as an important publication in the study of East Asian religions. The stated purpose of the journal was to draw scholars in Europe, America, and East Asia closer together. Seidel's position in Kyoto put her in a unique position to serve as a link between the various geographic communities of scholars. She was an international scholar: German in her upbringing and cultural identity, French by citizenship and education, residing and working in Japan, and wooed by the English-speaking academic establishment.

== Writing ==
Her published works communicated her thoughts with a clarity which she achieved by avoiding stylistic embellishments and by making no concessions to fashionable theoretical terminology. Seidel's viewpoint on Chinese religion as depicted in her article "Taoism" written for the 15th edition of the Encyclopædia Britannica (1975), broke the orthodox mould. While her work was founded on early religious texts, which she subjected to the most rigorous philological scrutiny, her analysis of religion extended to all aspects of culture. She placed her main emphasis on religious practice in its historical context, rather than becoming entangled in doctrinal speculation. Seidel was an atheist and did not practise Taoism; despite this, she was noted for approaching religious phenomena with a high degree of empathy. Although Seidel did not undertake long-term systematic fieldwork on Chinese religion, she paid meticulous attention to contemporary religious phenomena, which she interpreted as a continuum with ancient textual traditions. She had a strongly comparative perspective on religion, and consistently observed and recorded the religious landscape wherever she traveled. Her important collections of documents remain in the keeping of the Hobogirin Institute.

Seidel died before writing a major synthesis of her research field, though there were some initial attempts in such a direction (the booklet Taoismus, Die inoffizielle Hochreligion Chinas and her magisterial Chronicle of Taoist Studies in the West, 1950-1990). Her work remained unfinished at the time of her death.
