= The Day of the Lord =

Future apocalyptic time

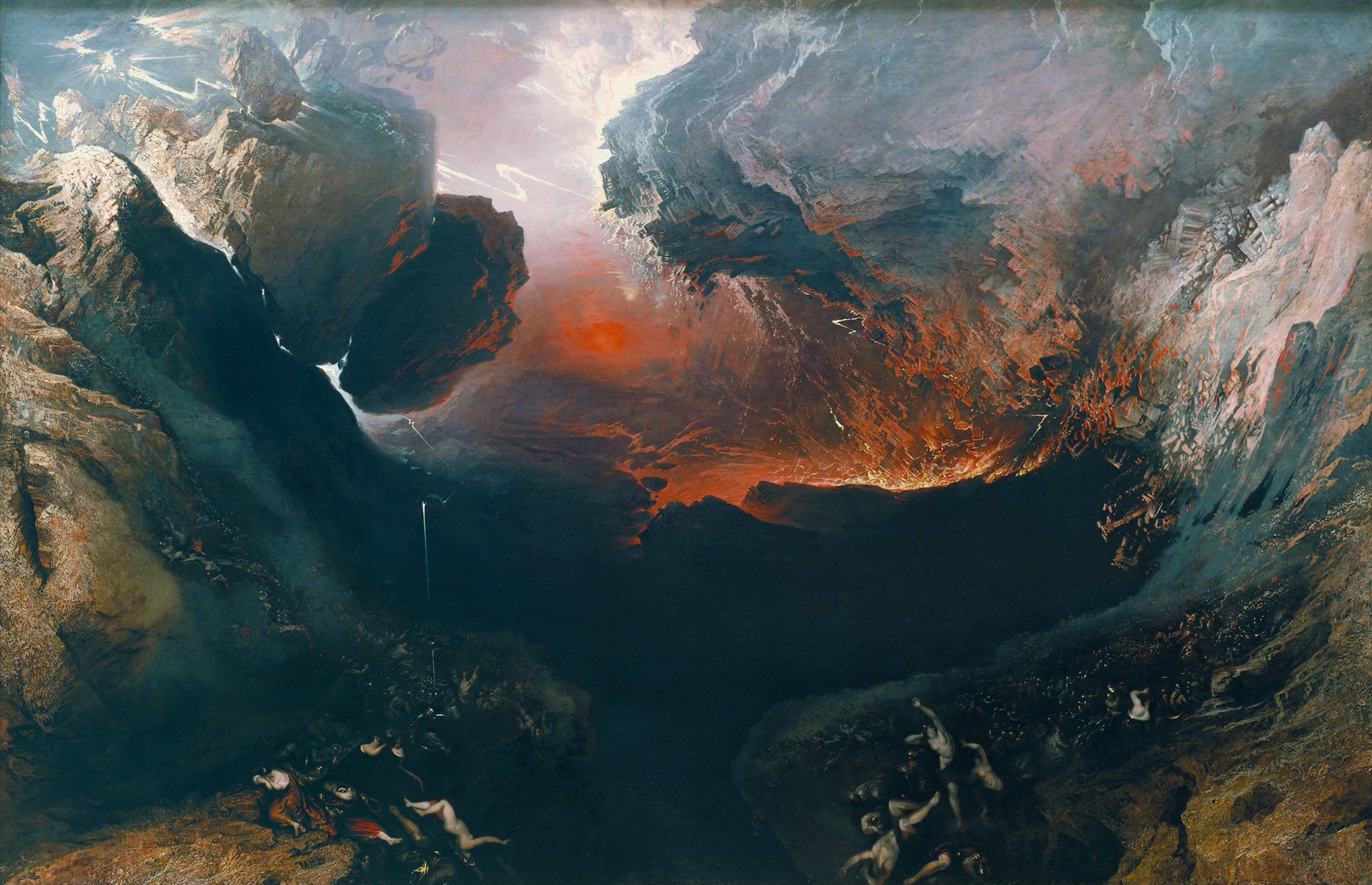
The End of the World, also known as The Great Day of His Wrath by John Martin.

"The Day of the LORD” is a biblical term and theme used in both the Hebrew Bible (יֹום יְהוָה Yom Adonai) and the New Testament (ἡμέρα κυρίου, hēmera Kyriou), as in "The sun shall be turned into darkness, and the moon into blood, before the great and the terrible day of the LORD come" (Joel 2:31, cited in Acts 2:20).

In the Hebrew Bible, the meaning of the phrases refers to temporal events such as the invasion of a foreign army, the capture of a city and the suffering that befalls the inhabitants. This appears much in the second chapter of Isaiah which is read on the Sabbath of Vision, immediately before the 10th of Av.

The prophet Malachi foretells the return of Elijah immediately preceding the "great and terrible day of the LORD". This prophecy is read in synagogues on the Great Sabbath immediately preceding Passover.

In the New Testament, the "day of the Lord" may also refer to the writer's own times, or it may refer to predicted events in a later age of earth's history including the final judgment and the World to Come. The expression may also have an extended meaning in referring to both the first and second comings of Jesus Christ.

== Hebrew Bible usage ==
It is used first by Isaiah and subsequently incorporated into prophetic and apocalyptic texts of the Bible. It relies on military images to describe the Lord as a "divine warrior" who will conquer his enemies. In certain prophetic texts of the Hebrew Bible, the enemies of the Lord are Israel's enemies, and in these visions the day of the Lord brings victory for the people of ancient Israel. Other prophets use the imagery as a warning to Israel or its leaders and for them, the day of the Lord will mean destruction for the biblical nations of Israel and/or Judah. This concept develops throughout Jewish and Christian Scripture into a day of divine, apocalyptic judgment at the end of the world.

In the biblical canon, the earliest, direct use of the phrase is in Isaiah 2: "For the day of the LORD of hosts shall be upon every one that is proud and lofty, and upon every one that is lifted up; and he shall be brought low" (Isaiah 2:12). Another early use of the phrase is in Amos 5:18-20. Wright suggests that the phrase was already a standard one, and Amos' hearers would take it to mean "the day when Yahweh would intervene to put Israel at the head of the nations, irrespective of Israel's faithfulness to Him." Yet Amos declares "Woe to you who long for the day of the LORD! Why do you long for the day of the LORD? That day will be darkness, not light" (Amos 5:18 NIV). Because Israel had sinned, God would come in judgement on them. Thus, the day of the Lord is about God chastening his people, whether it be through the Babylonian invasion of Jerusalem or a locust plague described in Joel 2:1–11. Yet Joel 2:32 holds a promise that on the Day of the Lord, "everyone who calls on the name of the LORD will be saved."

In Zephaniah 1:8, the Day of the LORD is equated with "the day of the LORD's sacrifice". This has led Christian interpreters to equate it with Jesus' death.

Reference to a specific day as being "The Day of the Lord" is found in the Book of Daniel 12:12, "Blessed is he who waits and comes unto 1,335 days."

== New Testament usage ==
This promise is also picked up in the New Testament, when Joel 2:28-32 is quoted in Acts 2:17-21. The phrase is also used in 1 Thessalonians 5:2 which speaks about the day of the Lord coming suddenly.

The phrase alludes to a judgment for eternal rewards in 2 Corinthians 1:14 where it says "we are your rejoicing, even as ye also are ours in the day of the Lord Jesus".

The Book of Revelation describes the day of the Lord as an apocalyptic time of God's almighty wrath, which comes upon those who are deemed wicked. The text pictures every man hiding in the rocks of the mountains during a major earthquake in an attempt to hide from God's wrath, while celestial phenomena turn the moon blood red and the sun dark. These celestial phenomena are also mentioned in Joel 2:31, which foretells the same precise order of events mentioned in Revelation: The moon turns blood red and the sun turns dark before the great day of the Lord. Matthew 24:29-31 mentions the same event, yet it places the celestial phenomenon as occurring after the "tribulation of those days". According to these passages, it then seems that the day of the Lord is an event closely tied with the coming of the Messiah to judge the world.

2 Peter 3:8-10 reads

^{8}But, beloved, do not forget this one thing, that with the Lord one day [is] as a thousand years, and a thousand years as one day. ^{9}The Lord is not slack concerning [His] promise, as some count slackness, but is long suffering toward us, not willing that any should perish but that all should come to repentance. ^{10}But the day of the Lord will come as a thief in the night, in which the heavens will pass away with a great noise, and the elements will melt with fervent heat; both the earth and the works that are in it will be burned up.

=== "Lord's Day" as Christian day of worship ===
Meredith Kline equates the "Day of the Lord" with the "Lord's Day", which is usually taken to refer to the Christian weekly day of rest. Kline argues that the "Lord's Day" mentioned in Revelation 1:10 is not first day of the week, but refers to "the already realized heavenly enthronement of the Lord Jesus." On the other hand, the apostolic tradition confirms several testimonies of the apostolic fathers and church fathers which proclaim that early Christians took Sunday as their day of worship and rest. The Didaché, the earliest Christian testimony, says "Come together on the Lord's Day, break bread and celebrate thanksgiving".
