= Acts 2 =

- ← chapter 1 chapter 3 →
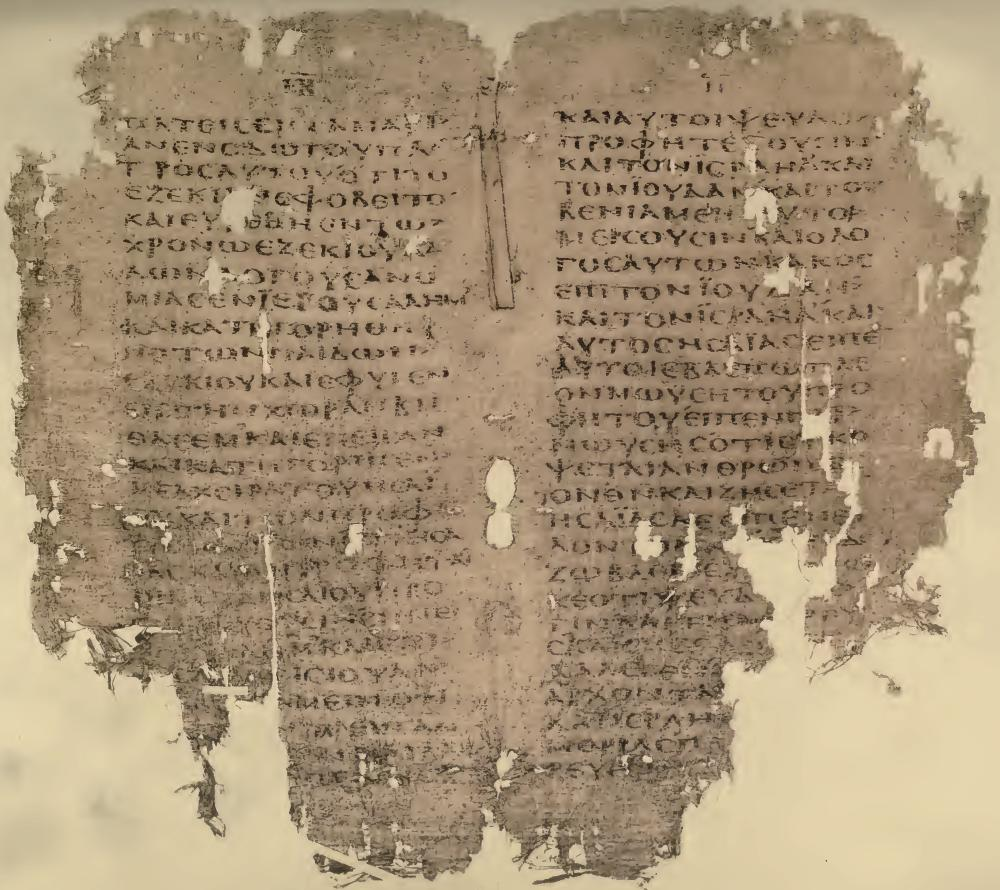
- Greek text of Acts 2:11–22 in Uncial 076, written in 5th/6th century.
- Book: Acts of the Apostles
- Category: Church history
- Christian Bible part: New Testament
- Order in the Christian part: 5

Acts 2 is the second chapter of the Acts of the Apostles in the New Testament of the Christian Bible. Early Christian tradition asserted that Luke composed this book as well as the Gospel of Luke. Critical opinion on the tradition was evenly divided at the end of the 20th century. This chapter records the events on the day of Pentecost, about 10 days after the ascension of Jesus Christ.

== Text ==
The original text was written in Koine Greek. This chapter is divided into 47 verses.

=== Textual witnesses ===
Some early manuscripts containing the text of this chapter are:

- Papyrus 91 (3rd century; extant verses 30–37; 46–47)
- Codex Vaticanus (350-375)
- Codex Sinaiticus (325–350)
- Codex Bezae (~400)
- Codex Alexandrinus (400–440)
- Codex Ephraemi Rescriptus (~450)
- Codex Laudianus (~550).

=== Old Testament references ===
- Acts 2:16–21: Joel 2:28–32 and Isaiah 44:3
- Acts 2:25–28: Psalm 16:8–11
- Acts 2:29: 1 Kings 2:10
- Acts 2:30: Psalm 132:11
- Acts 2:31: Psalm 16:11
- Acts 2:34–35: Psalm 110:1.

=== New Testament references ===
- Acts 2:21: Romans 10:13.

== Coming of the Holy Spirit on the day of Pentecost (verses 1–43) ==
The biblical narrative of Pentecost is given in the second chapter of the Acts of the Apostles. Present were about one hundred and twenty followers of Christ (Acts 1:15), all together "in one place" (Acts 2:1), including the Twelve Apostles (i.e. the eleven disciples and Matthias, who had replaced Judas Iscariot), Jesus' mother Mary, various other women disciples and Jesus' brothers (Acts 1:14). Their reception of the Holy Spirit and their empowerment to speak in tongues are recounted in Acts 2:1–6: J. Rawson Lumby holds that the "one place" was clearly "the upper room where the Apostles abode, and where the disciples had met for the election of Matthias".

=== Verses 1–7 ===
¹When the day of Pentecost had come, they were all together in one place. ²And suddenly from heaven there came a sound like the rush of a violent wind, and it filled the entire house where they were sitting. ³Divided tongues, as of fire, appeared among them, and a tongue rested on each of them. ⁴All of them were filled with the Holy Spirit and began to speak in other languages, as the Spirit gave them ability.

⁵Now there were devout Jews from every nation under heaven living in Jerusalem. ⁶And at this sound the crowd gathered and was bewildered, because each one heard them speaking in the native language of each. ⁷Then they were all amazed and marveled, saying to one another, "Look, are not all these who speak Galileans?"

— Acts 2:1–7: NRSV

While those on whom the Spirit had descended were speaking in many languages, the gathering crowd's reaction progressed from perplexity (verse 6) to amazement (verse 7). In verse 6, "this sound" (Greek: της φωνης ταυτης, tēs phōnēs tautēs) may refer to "the sound from heaven, as of a rushing mighty wind" in verse 2, or to the speaking in tongues in verse 4. Henry Alford suggests that "we may safely decide for the former reference" (the sound from heaven) because the writer would have written "φωναί" (phōnai: plural) if the multiple voices spoken in tongues was intended. The paraphrase in The Living Bible emphasizes the same reading: "when they heard the roaring in the sky above the house".

Peter then stood up with the eleven and proclaimed to the crowd that this event was the fulfillment of the prophecy of Joel (in Joel 2:28–29): "… I will pour out my Spirit…". (Acts 2:17).

=== Verse 15 ===
For these are not drunk, as you suppose, since it is the third hour of the day.

"The third hour of the day" (about 9:00 AM): Peter explains that it is only breakfast time.

=== Verses 16–21 ===
¹⁶But this is what was spoken by the prophet Joel:

¹⁷'In the last days it shall be, says God,
'that I will pour out My Spirit on all flesh;
your sons and your daughters shall prophesy,
your young men shall see visions,
and your old men shall dream dreams.
¹⁸Even on My menservants and maidservants
I will pour out My Spirit in those days;
and they shall prophesy.
¹⁹And I will show wonders in heaven above
and signs on the earth below:
blood, and fire, and vapor of smoke.
²⁰The sun shall be turned into darkness,
and the moon into blood,
before that great and glorious day of the Lord comes.
²¹And whoever calls on the name of the Lord shall be saved.'

— Acts 2:16–21: MEV

The extended quotation from Joel 2:28–32 (LXX) is to support that this event is something predicted in Scripture, and it clarifies some points about the apostolic proclamation:

1. The ecstatic speech is to be identified with the biblical gift of prophecy, as the work of the same Spirit of God.
2. This is a phenomenon of 'the last days' (verse 17), but is a stage before the final 'day of the Lord' (verse 20).

=== Verses 22–24 ===
²²"Men of Israel, hear these words: Jesus of Nazareth was a man attested to you by God with powerful works and wonders and signs, which God did through Him in your midst, as you yourselves know. ²³You have taken Him, who was handed over to you by the ordained counsel and foreknowledge of God, and by lawless hands have crucified and killed Him, ²⁴whom God raised up by loosening the pull of death, because it was not possible that He should be held by it.

— Acts 2:22–24: MEV

Peter then turns to the question, "Who was Jesus?", appealing to many people in the audience who had witnessed the miracles performed by Jesus, as a divine attestation of his ministry in the midst of his people (verse 22). Jesus' death is the responsibility of three groups: (1) 'the immediate agency' ('lawless hands' or 'lawless men'); (2) 'the proximate motive force' (the local audience which had witnessed Jesus' ministry, verses 22–23); and behind both of those, 'the divine plan' (verse 24).

- "Loosening" (KJV/NKJV: "having loosed"): or having "destroyed or abolished",
- "Pull of death" (KJV/NKJV: "pains of death"): also in the sense of "birth pangs".

=== Verses 25–28 ===
Verses 25 to 28 quote Psalm 16:

²⁵For David says concerning Him:

‘I foresaw the Lord always before my face,
For He is at my right hand, that I may not be shaken.
²⁶Therefore my heart rejoiced, and my tongue was glad;
Moreover my flesh also will rest in hope.
²⁷For You will not leave my soul in Hades,
Nor will You allow Your Holy One to see corruption.
²⁸You have made known to me the ways of life;
You will make me full of joy in Your presence.’

— Acts 2:25–28: NKJV

According to a Christian interpretation, verse 27 recalls the belief in the preservation of the mortal bodies of the saints, identified with the people whose souls weren't condemned to the Hell. The latter is referred with the Hebrew word Sheol. It has also been seen as a prophecy of Jesus' Harrowing of Hell, while verse 26 would have predicted the final Resurrection of the flesh for which the "body also will rest in hope".

Furthermore, the paths of life of Acts 2:28 recall the more well known Jesus self-definition as being "the way, the truth, the life" (John 14:6, even using the same Greek words (respectively: hodous zōēs and hodos, alētheia, zōē)

=== Verses 32–36 ===
Verses 34 and 35 quote Psalm 110:1, (Note: One verse in the psalm is divided into two verses in Acts) and lead Peter to assert that:

Therefore let all the house of Israel know assuredly that God has made this Jesus, whom you crucified, both Lord and Christ.

— Acts 2:36: NKJV

Some manuscripts omit "both" from verse 36.

=== Verses 37-38 ===
The assemble crowds ask how they should respond.

Then Peter said to them, "Repent, and let every one of you be baptized in the name of Jesus Christ for the remission of sins; and you shall receive the gift of the Holy Spirit."

— Acts 2:38: NKJV

"Remission": or "forgiveness"

Acts 2:41 then reports that about 3000 people were baptized and added to the number of believers.

=== Verse 41 ===
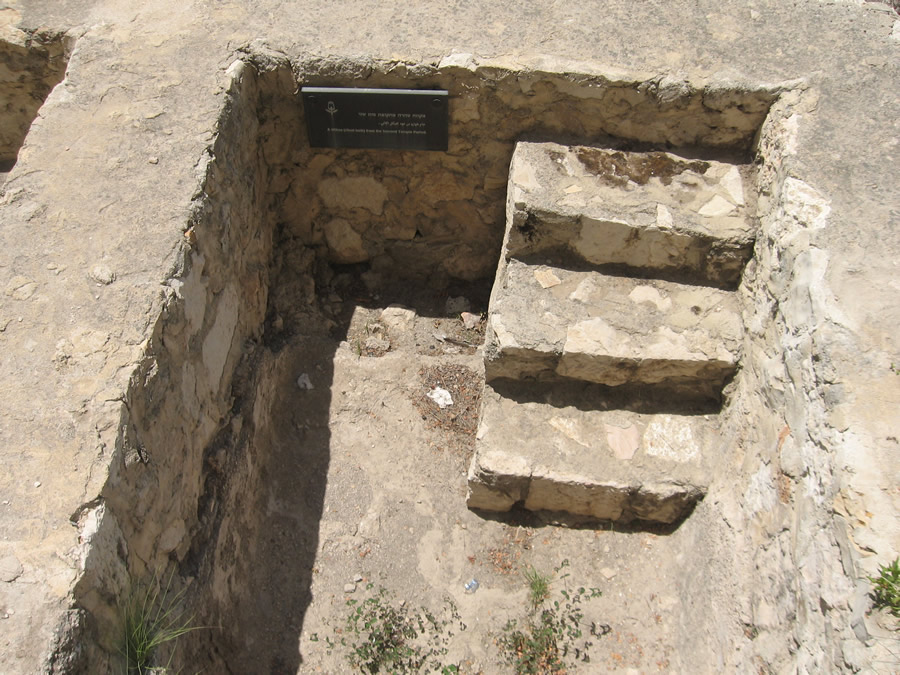
One of many ancient mikvehs in Jerusalem near the Temple Mount, where the baptism of some people might have taken place on the Day of Pentecost.

Then those who gladly received his word were baptized; and that day about three thousand souls were added to them.

— Acts 2:41: NKJV

It would take a long time to immerse all 3,000 people in a single public pool such as Pool of Siloam, so the apostles probably made use of many mikvehs around the Temple Mount. A "mikveh" is a stepped immersion pool used by Jews for purification, before prayer or worship, to become ritually clean. Archaeological excavations in Jerusalem (and other Jewish communities) have discovered hundreds of mikvehs from before, during, and after the time of Jesus.

The fact that many understood in their native language, what the Spirit was saying demonstrates that the first miracle the Holy Spirit carried out was the translation of the Gospel. This message is one that is communicating "God's deeds of power". Such miracle carries the undertone that the gospel, would be for a diverse group that for a long time had been divided. "Whereas in Babel humanity was divided by different tongues, in Pentecost that division was overcome."

=== Location of the first Pentecost ===
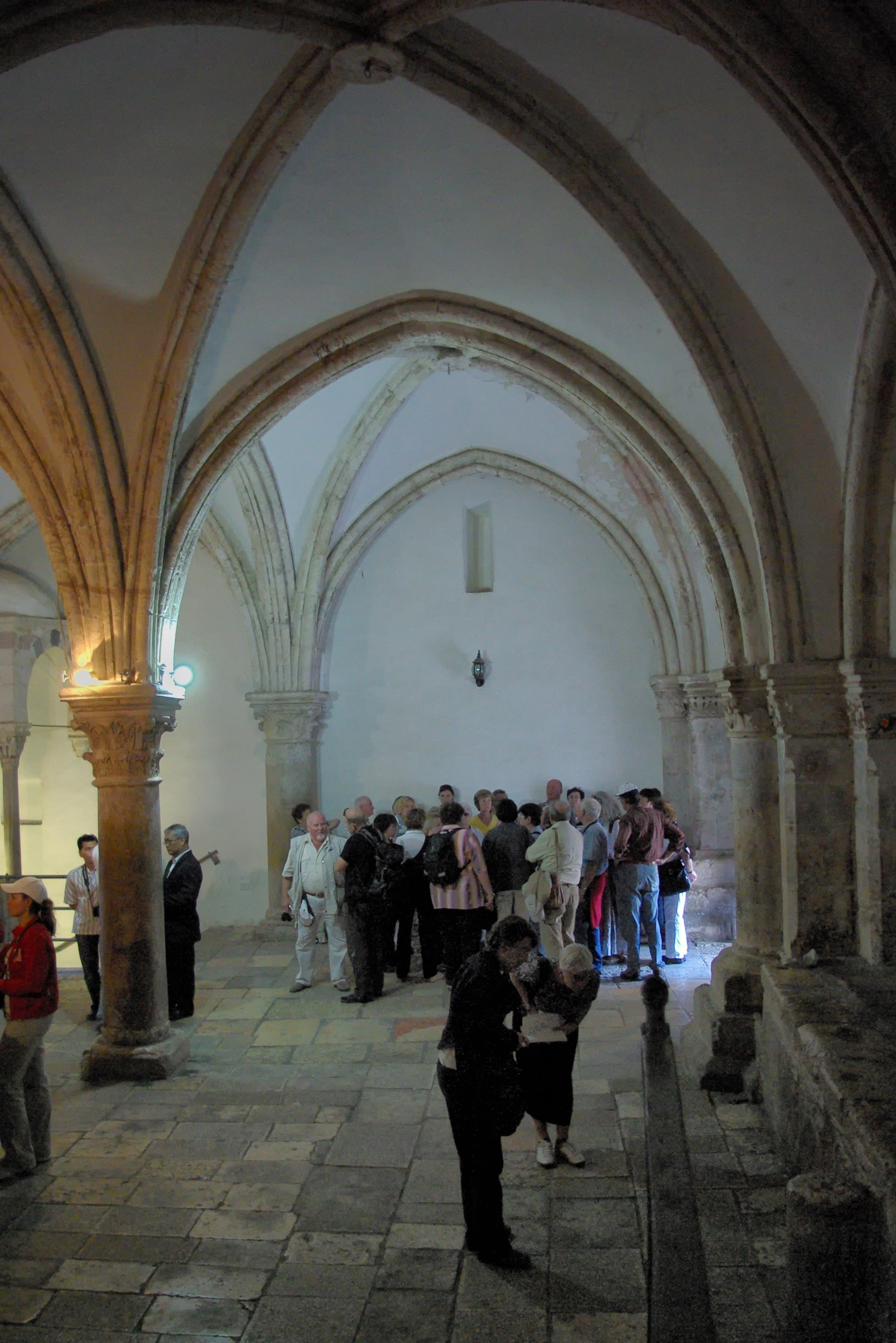
The Cenacle on Mount Zion, claimed to be the location of the Last Supper and Pentecost. Bargil Pixner claims the original Church of the Apostles is located under the current structure.

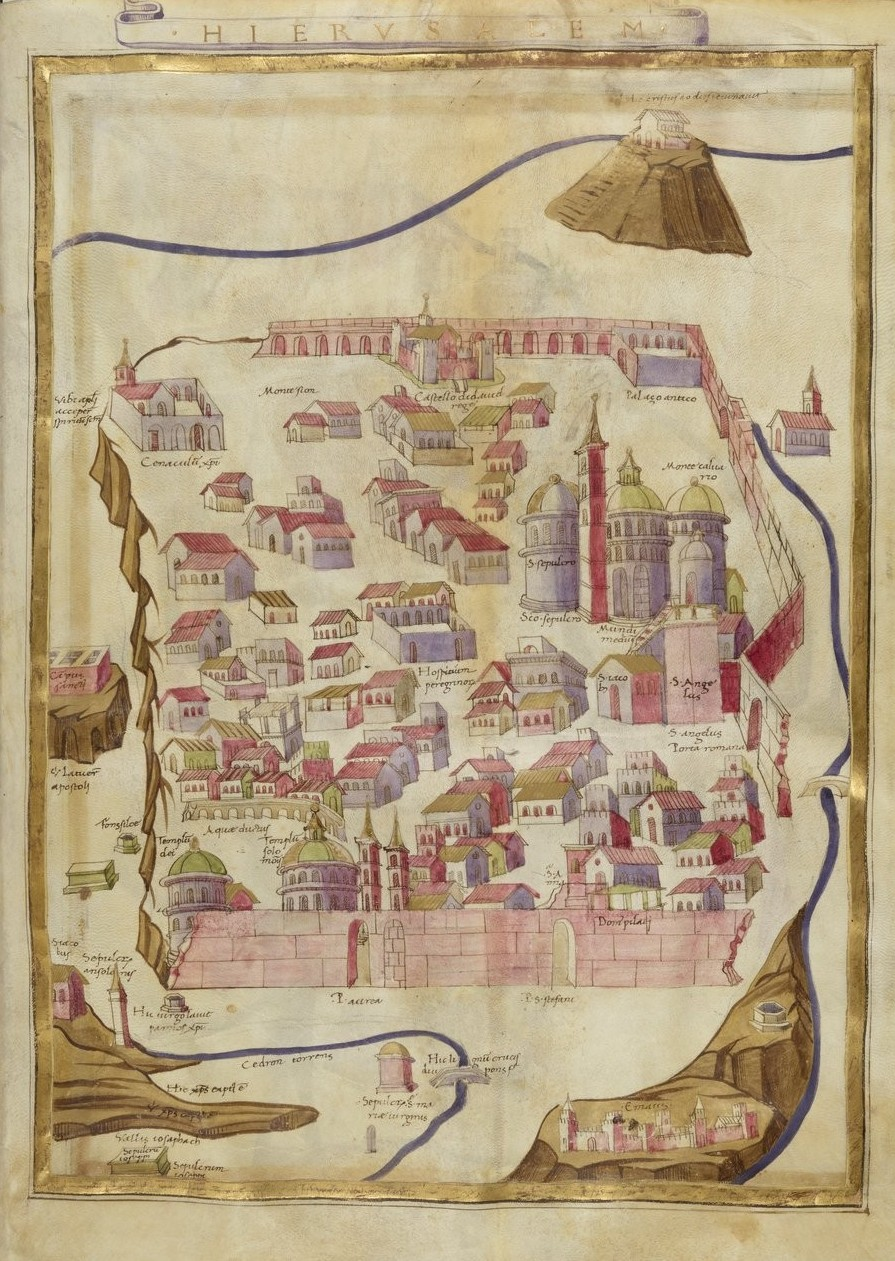
This 1472 map of Jerusalem notes the place of the first Pentecost, "Ubi apostoli acceperunt spiritum sanctum", as the location of the cenacle (top left).

Traditional interpretation holds that the Descent of the Holy Spirit took place in the Upper Room, or Cenacle, on the day of Pentecost (Shavuot). The Upper Room was first mentioned in Luke 22:12–13. This Upper Room was to be the location of the Last Supper and the institution of Holy Communion. The other mention of an "upper room" is in Acts 1:13–14, the continuation of the Luke narrative, authored by the same biblical writer.

Here the disciples and women waited and they gave themselves up to constant prayer, until the arrival of the "wind" mentioned above.

== A description of the first Church (verses 44–47) ==
Acts 2:44–47 contains a description of the earliest church, giving a practical view of how the church members acted. The verses cover several aspects of life:

- The believers held everything in common
- They sold property and possessions so as to give to anyone who was in need
- They met together in the temple courts each day
- They ate together in each other's homes.

== See also ==
- 2nd Chapter of Acts (a musical group)
- Christian socialism
- From each according to his ability, to each according to his needs
- Pentecost
- Simon Peter
- Zwijndrechtse nieuwlichters, a 19th-century Protestant sect which adopted an Acts 2-derived lifestyle
- Related Bible parts: Psalm 16, Psalm 110, Joel 2, Matthew 22, Mark 12, Luke 20, Acts 1, Acts 3, Acts 9, Acts 10, 1 Corinthians 15, Ephesians 2, Hebrews 1

== Sources ==
- Alexander, Loveday (2007). "62. Acts". In Barton, John; Muddiman, John (eds.). The Oxford Bible Commentary (first (paperback) ed.). Oxford University Press. pp. 1028–1061. ISBN 978-0199277186.
- Coogan, Michael David (2007). Coogan, Michael David; Brettler, Marc Zvi; Newsom, Carol Ann; Perkins, Pheme (eds.). The New Oxford Annotated Bible with the Apocryphal/Deuterocanonical Books: New Revised Standard Version, Issue 48 (Augmented 3rd ed.). Oxford University Press. ISBN 9780195288810.
- Gonzalez, Justo L. (2001). Acts: The Gospel of the Spirit. Mary Knolls, New York: Orbis Books. ISBN 1-57075-398-9.
- Kirkpatrick, A. F. (1901). The Book of Psalms: with Introduction and Notes. The Cambridge Bible for Schools and Colleges. Vol. Book IV and V: Psalms XC-CL. Cambridge: At the University Press.
