= Book of Amos =

Book of the Bible

The Book of Amos is the third of the Twelve Minor Prophets in the Christian Old Testament and Jewish Tanakh and the second in the Greek Septuagint. The Book of Amos has nine chapters. According to the Bible, Amos was an older contemporary of Hosea and Isaiah, and was active c. 750 BC during the reign of Jeroboam II (788–747 BC) of Samaria (Northern Israel), while Uzziah was King of Judah. Amos is said to have lived in the kingdom of Judah but preached in the northern Kingdom of Israel where themes of social justice, God's omnipotence, and divine judgment became staples of prophecy. In recent years, scholars have grown more skeptical of the Book of Amos's presentation of Amos's biography and background. It is known for its distinct "sinister tone and violent portrayal of God."

== Structure ==
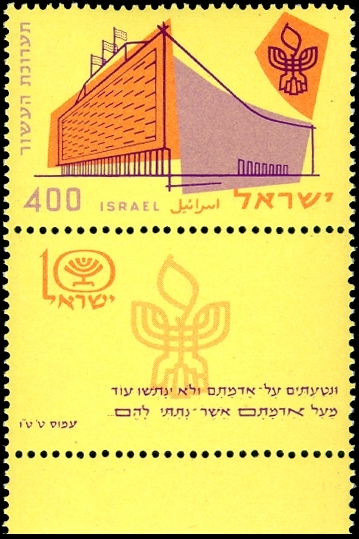
Quote from Amos 9:15 on an Israeli stamp: "And I will plant them upon their land, and they shall no more be pulled up out of their land which I have given them."

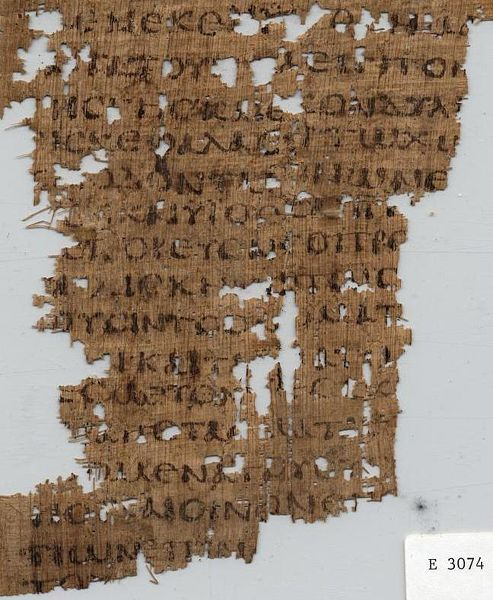
Papyrus Oxyrhynchus 846: Amos 2 (LXX)

According to Michael D. Coogan, the Book of Amos can be structured as follows:

- Oracles against the nations (1:3–2:6)
- Oracle concerning prophecy (3:3–8)
- Addresses to groups in Israel
  - Women of Samaria (4:1–3)
  - Rich people in Samaria (6:1–7)
  - Rich people in Jerusalem (8:4–8)
- Five visions of God's judgment on Israel, interrupted by a confrontation between Amos and his listeners at Bethel (7:10–17):
  - Locusts (7:1–3)
  - Fire (7:4–6)
  - A plumb line (7:7–9)
  - A basket of fruit (8:1–3)
  - God beside the altar (9:1–8a)
- Epilogue (9:8b–15)

== Summary ==
The book opens with a historical note about the prophet, then a short oracle announcing Yahweh's judgment (repeated in the Book of Joel). The prophet denounces the crimes committed by the gentile (non-Jewish) nations, and tells Israel that even they have sinned and are guilty of the same crimes, and reports five symbolic visions prophesying the destruction of Israel. The fourth vision turns on a wordplay that translation cannot reproduce: Amos is shown a basket of summer fruit (qayits) and told that the end (qets) has come for Israel. The wordplay is a standard example in the scholarly catalogues of Hebrew paronomasia. Included in this, with no apparent order, are an oracle on the nature of prophecy, snippets of hymns, oracles of woe, a third-person prose narrative concerning the prophet, and an oracle promising restoration of the House of David, which had not yet fallen in the lifetime of Amos.

== Composition ==
Amos prophesied during the reigns of Jeroboam II of Israel and Uzziah of Judah; this places him in the first half of the 8th century BC. According to the book's superscription (Amos 1:1) he lived in Tekoa, a town in Judah south of Jerusalem, but his prophetic mission was in the northern kingdom. He is called a "shepherd" and a "dresser of sycamore trees", but the book's literary qualities suggest a man of education rather than a poor farmer.

Scholars have long recognized that Amos utilized an ancient hymn within his prophecy, verses of which are found at 4:13, 5:8–9, 8:8, and 9:5–6. This hymn is best understood as praising Yahweh for his judgment, demonstrated in his destructive power, rather than praise for creation. Scholarship has also identified 'Sumerian City Lament' (SCL) motifs within Amos and particularly the hymn, offering the possibility that Amos used SCL as a literary template for his prophecy of Jerusalem's destruction. The Amos hymn has also been discussed in terms of a "covenant curse" which was used to warn Israel of the consequences of breaking the covenant, and in particular a "Flood covenant-curse" motif, first identified by D.R. Hillers. Recent scholarship has shown Amos's hymn is an ancient narrative text, has identified a new verse at 7.4; and has compared the hymn to the Genesis Flood account and Job 9:5–10.

== Themes ==
The central idea of the book of Amos is that God puts his people on the same level as the surrounding nations—God expects the same purity of them all. As with all nations that rise up against the kingdom of God, Israel and Judah will not be exempt from the judgment of God when they engage idolatry and unjust ways. The nation that represents Yahweh must be made pure of anything or anyone that profanes the name of God; his name must be exalted.

Amos is the first prophet to use the term "the Day of the Lord". This phrase becomes important within future prophetic and apocalyptic literature. For the people of Israel "The Day of the Lord" is the day when God will fight against his and their enemies, and it will be a day of victory for Israel. However, Amos and other prophets include Israel as an enemy of God, as Israel is guilty of injustice toward the innocent, poor, and young women. To Amos "The Day of the Lord" will be a day of doom.

Other major ideas proposed in the book of Amos include justice and concern for the disadvantaged, and that Yahweh is God of all nations (not just Israel), and is likewise the judge of all nations, and is also a God of moral righteousness. Also that Yahweh created all people, and the idea that Israel's covenant with God did not exempt them from accountability for sin; as well as that God elected and liberated Israel so that he would be known throughout the world. And that if God destroys the unjust, a remnant will remain, and that God is free to judge whether to redeem Israel.

=== Translations of verse 5:26 ===
==== Sakkuth ====
English translations of Amos 5:26 render the Hebrew word סִכּוּת as a direct Romanisation: Sakkuth, Sikkuth, or Siccuth. There is some ambiguity about whether Sakkuth is a name, a generic word for a deity, or a word referring to a portable shrine. The King James Version translates Sakkuth as "tabernacle".

==== Saĝkud ====
It has been suggested that Sakkuth mentioned in verse 5:26, might be the same deity as Mesopotamian Saĝkud. The Masoretic Text vocalizes the name, written in Hebrew as skwt, as sikkût, a hapax legomenon. The conclusion that a deity is meant is not universally accepted, and as an alternative it has been proposed that the correct reading might be a common noun such as sukkat, "hut", or a derivative of the term sikkāntu, "stele".

==== Moloch ====
Verse 5:26 also mentions Moloch in some translations. Moloch corresponds to "your king" in other English versions.

== Archaeology ==
In excavations in the City of David in Jerusalem, archaeologists discovered a layer dating back to an earthquake that occurred in the 8th century BC, a discovery that appears to agree with the account in Amos 1:1–2.

Book of Amos Minor prophets
Preceded by Joel	Hebrew Bible	Succeeded by Obadiah
Preceded by Joel	Christian; Old Testament	Succeeded by Obadiah
