= Book of Micah =

Book in the Hebrew Bible

The Book of Micah is the sixth of the twelve minor prophets in the Hebrew Bible. (Note: The Masoretic Text has a marginal note at Micah 3:12 stating that this verse is the middle verse of "the book", i.e. the book of the twelve minor prophets.) The book has seven chapters. Ostensibly, it records the sayings of Micah, whose name is Mikayahu (Hebrew: מִיכָיָ֫הוּ), meaning "Who is like Yahweh?", an 8th-century BCE prophet from the village of Moresheth in Judah (Hebrew name from the opening verse: מיכה המרשתי).

The book has three major divisions, chapters 1–2, 3–5 and 6–7, each introduced by the word "Hear", with a pattern of alternating announcements of doom and expressions of hope within each division. Micah reproaches unjust leaders, defends the rights of the poor against the rich and powerful; while looking forward to a world at peace centered on Zion under the leadership of a new Davidic monarch.

While the book is relatively short, it includes lament (1:8–16; 7:8–10), theophany (1.3–4), a hymnic prayer of petition and confidence (7:14–20), and the "covenant lawsuit" (6:1–8), a distinct genre in which Yahweh (God) sues Israel for breach of contract of the Mosaic covenant.

The formation of the Book of Micah is debated, with a consensus that its final stage occurred during the Persian period or Hellenistic period, but uncertainty remains about whether it was formed at the time or merely finalized.

== Setting ==
Assyrian warriors armed with slings from the palace of Sennacherib, 7th century BCE

The opening verse identifies the prophet as "Micah of Moresheth" (a town in southern Judah), and states that he lived during the reigns of Jotham, Ahaz and Hezekiah, roughly 750–700 BCE.

This corresponds to the period when, after a long period of peace, Israel, Judah, and the other nations of the region came under increasing pressure from the aggressive and rapidly expanding Neo-Assyrian Empire. Between 734 and 727 Tiglath-Pileser III of Assyria conducted almost annual campaigns in the Levant, reducing the Kingdom of Israel, the Kingdom of Judah and the Philistine cities to vassalage, receiving tribute from Ammon, Moab and Edom, and absorbing Damascus (the Kingdom of Aram) into the Empire. On Tiglath-Pileser's death Israel rebelled, resulting in an Assyrian counter-attack and the destruction of the capital, Samaria, in 721 after a three-year siege. Micah 1:2–7 draws on this event: Samaria, says the prophet, has been destroyed by God because of its crimes of idolatry, oppression of the poor, and misuse of power. The Assyrian attacks on Israel (the northern kingdom) led to an influx of refugees into Judah, which would have increased social stresses, while at the same time the authorities in Jerusalem had to invest huge amounts in tribute and defense.

When the Assyrians attacked Judah in 701 they did so via the Philistine coast and the Shephelah, the border region which included Micah's village of Moresheth, as well as Lachish, Judah's second largest city. This in turn forms the background to verses 1:8–16, in which Micah warns the towns of the coming disaster (Lachish is singled out for special mention, accused of the corrupt practices of both Samaria and Jerusalem). In verses 2:1–5 he denounces the appropriation of land and houses, which might simply be the greed of the wealthy and powerful, or possibly the result of the militarizing of the area in preparation for the Assyrian attack.

== Composition ==
The formation of the Book of Micah is a topic of scholarly debate. The 2021 Oxford Handbook of the Minor Prophets summarizes:

"There is a consensus that the book has a long history of formation with the Persian (or even Hellenistic) period as its last stage. However, it is contested whether it was formed in these days or only finalized after a longer history of tradition."

Some, but not all, scholars accept that only chapters 1–3 contain material from the late 8th-century BCE prophet Micah. According to scholars, the latest material comes from the post-Exilic period after the Temple was rebuilt in 515 BCE, so that the early 5th century BCE seems to be the period when the book was completed. The first stage was the collection and arrangement of some spoken sayings of the historical Micah (the material in chapters 1–3), in which the prophet attacks those who build estates through oppression and depicts the Assyrian invasion of Judah as Yahweh's punishment on the kingdom's corrupt rulers, including a prophecy that the Temple will be destroyed.

The prophecy was not fulfilled in Micah's time, but a hundred years later when Judah was facing a similar crisis with the Neo-Babylonian Empire, Micah's prophecies were reworked and expanded to reflect the new situation. Still later, after Jerusalem fell to the Neo-Babylonian Empire, the book was revised and expanded further to reflect the circumstances of the late exilic and post-exilic community.

== Surviving early manuscripts ==
The oldest surviving manuscripts were made hundreds of years after the period or periods of authorship. The earliest surviving Masoretic Text versions include the Codex Cairensis (895), the Petersburg Codex of the Prophets (916), and Codex Leningradensis (1008). Since 1947, the current text of the Aleppo Codex is missing Micah 1:1 to 5:1.

Fragments containing parts of this book in the original Biblical Hebrew were found among the Dead Sea Scrolls, including 4Q82 (25 BCE); and Wadi Murabba'at Minor Prophets (75–100 CE).

There is also a translation into Koine Greek known as the Septuagint, made in the last few centuries BCE. Extant ancient manuscripts of the Septuagint version include Codex Vaticanus (4th century), Codex Alexandrinus (5th century) and Codex Marchalianus (6th century). The Book of Micah is missing in the extant Codex Sinaiticus. Some fragments containing parts of this book in Greek were found among the Dead Sea Scrolls, that is, Naḥal Ḥever 8Ḥev1 (late 1st century BCE).

== Content ==
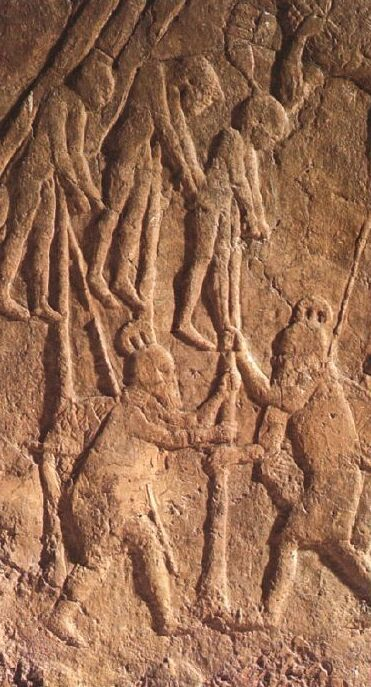
Impalement of Judeans by Assyrian soldiers (Neo-Assyrian relief)

=== Structure ===
At the broadest level, Micah can be divided into three roughly equal parts:

- Judgment against the nations and their leaders
- Restoration of Zion (chapters 4–5, which belong together despite their possibly unclear connection, probably exilic and post-exilic);
- God's lawsuit against Israel and expression of hope (chapters 6–7, also probably exilic and post-exilic).

James Limburg sees the word "Hear" in Micah 1:2, 3:1 and 6:1 as the marker for three separate sections, noting that Amos 3:1, 4:1, 5:1 and 8:4 mark similar divisions within the Book of Amos, another of the minor prophets.

Within this broad three-part structure are a series of alternating oracles of judgment and promises of restoration:

- 1.1 Superscription
- 1.2–2.11 Oracles of judgment
- 2.12–13 Oracles of restoration
- 3.1–12 Oracles of judgment
- 4.1–5.15 Oracles of restoration
- 6.1–7.6 Oracles of judgment
- 7.7–20 Oracles of restoration

=== Verse numbering ===
There is a difference in verse numbering between English Bibles and Hebrew texts, with Micah 4:14 in Hebrew texts being Micah 5:1 in English Bibles, and the Hebrew 5:1 etc. being numbered 5:2 etc. in English Bibles. This article generally follows the common numbering in Christian English Bible versions.

=== Subsections ===
- The Heading: As is typical of prophetic books, an anonymous editor or scribe has supplied the name of the prophet, an indication of his time of activity, and an identification of his speech as the "word of Yahweh", a generic term carrying a claim to prophetic legitimacy and authority. Samaria and Jerusalem are given prominence as the foci of the prophet's attention. Unlike prophets such as Isaiah and Hosea, no record of his father's name has been retained.
- Judgment against Samaria (1:2–7): Drawing upon ancient traditions for depicting a theophany, the prophet depicts the coming of Yahweh to punish the city, whose sins are idolatry and the abuse of the poor.
- Warnings to the cities of Judah (1:8–16): Samaria has fallen, Judah is next. Micah describes the destruction of the lesser towns of Judah (referring to the invasion of Judah by Sennacherib, 701 BCE). For these passages of doom on the various cities, paronomasia is used. Paronomasia is a literary device which 'plays' on the sound of each word for literary effect. For example, the inhabitants of Beth-le-aphrah ("house of dust") are told to "roll yourselves in the dust" (1:14). Though most of the paronomasia is lost in translation, it is the equivalent of 'Ashdod shall be but ashes,' where the fate of the city matches its name.
- Misuse of power denounced (2:1–5): Denounces those who appropriate the land and houses of others. The context may be simply the amassing wealth for its own sake, or could be connected with the militarisation of the region for the expected Assyrian attack.
- Threats against the prophet (2:6–11): The prophet is warned not to prophesy. He answers that the rulers are harming God's people, and want to listen only to those who advocate the virtues of wine.
- A later promise (2:12–13): These verses assume that judgment has already fallen and Israel is already scattered abroad.
- Judgment on wicked Zion (3:1–4): Israel's rulers are accused of gaining more wealth at the expense of the poor, by any means. The metaphor of flesh being torn from the people illustrates the length to which the ruling classes and socialites would go to further increase their wealth. Prophets are corrupt, seeking personal gain. Jerusalem's rulers believe that God will always be with them, but God will be with his people, and Jerusalem will be destroyed.
- Prophets for Profit (3:5-8): those condemned by Micah are explicitly called "prophets", while he appears to distance himself from personally being called a prophet.
- A concluding judgment (3:9-12) drawing together chapters 2–3.
- Zion's future hope (4:1–5): This is a later passage, almost identical to Isaiah 2:2–4. In the "latter days", "last days", or "the days to come", Zion (meaning the Temple) will be rebuilt, but by God, and based not on violence and corruption but on the desire to learn God's laws, beat swords into ploughshares and live in peace.

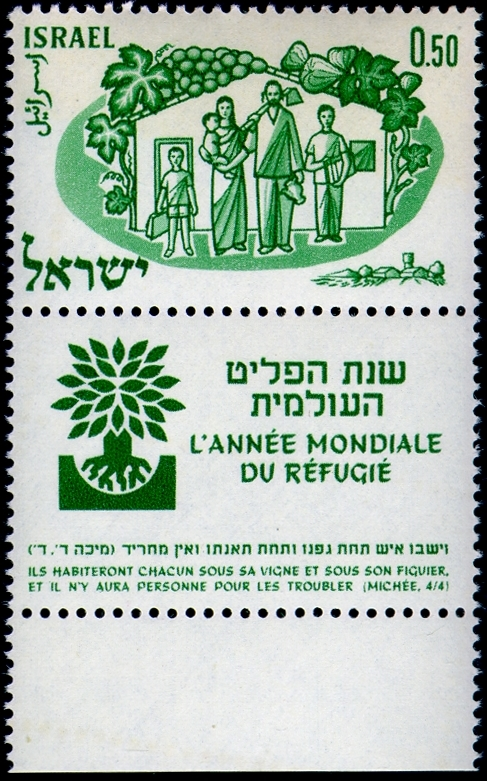
Israeli stamp marking World Refugee Year (1960), quoting Micah 4:4: "But they shall sit every man under his vine and under his fig tree; and none shall make them afraid." (KJV)

- Further promises to Zion (4:6–7): This is another later passage, promising Zion that she will once more enjoy her former independence and power.
- Deliverance from distress in Babylon (4:9–5:1, 4:9-14 in Hebrew Bible numbering) The similarity with Isaiah 41:15–16 and the references to Babylon suggest a later period for this material, although it is unclear whether a period during or after the siege of 586 is meant. Despite their trials, God will not desert his people.
- The promised ruler from Bethlehem (5:1[2]–14): This passage is usually dated to the exile. Although Micah 4:9 has asked "is there no king" in Zion, this chapter predicts that the coming Messiah will emerge from Bethlehem, the traditional home of the Davidic monarchy, to restore Israel. Assyria will invade (some translations prefer "if the Assyrians invade"), but she will be stricken, and Israel's punishment will lead to the punishment of the nations. Williamson treats Micah 4:8-5:6 as one unit, with "a clear and balanced structure".

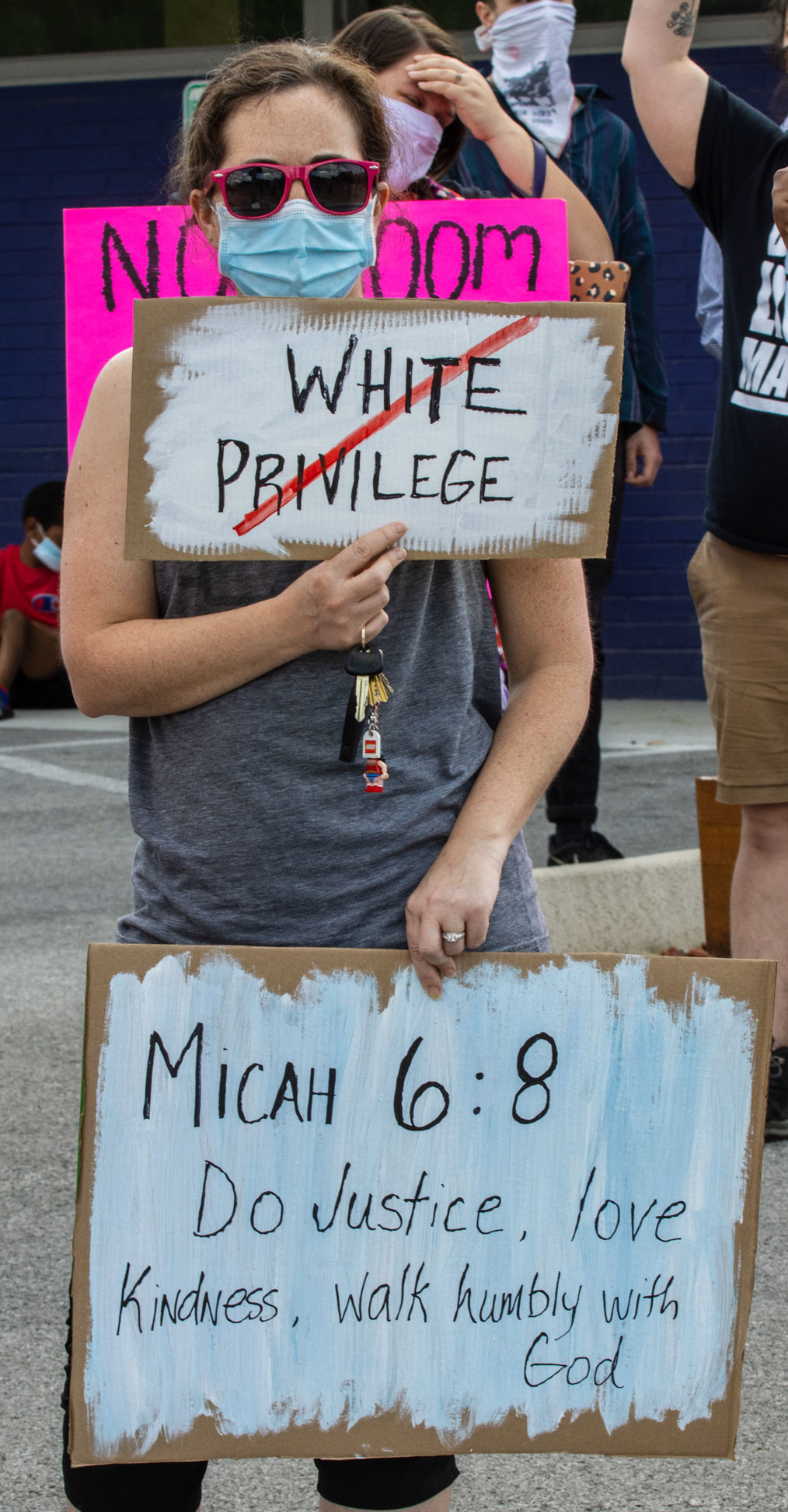
Demonstrator at a George Floyd protest in Columbus, Ohio, quoting Micah 6:8

- A Covenant lawsuit (6:1–5): Yahweh accuses Israel (the people of Judah) of breaking the covenant through their lack of justice and honesty, after the pattern of the kings of Israel (northern kingdom).
- Torah Liturgy (6:6–8): Micah speaks on behalf of the community asking what they should do in order to get back on God's good side. Micah then responds by saying that God requires only "to do justice, and to love mercy, and to walk humbly with your God", thus declaring that the burnt offering of both animals and humans (which may have been practiced in Judah under Kings Ahaz and Manasseh) is not necessary for God.
- The City as a Cheat (6:9–16): The city is reprimanded for its dishonest trade practices.
- Lament (7:1–7): The first passage in the book in the first person: whether it comes from Micah himself is disputed. Honesty and decency have vanished, families are filled with strife. The Jerusalem Bible suggests that verse 7, For my part, I look to Yahweh ... may have been the conclusion of the original book, before additional poems on Israel's restoration were added.
- A song of fallen Jerusalem (7:8–10): The first person voice continues, but now it is the city who speaks. She recognises that her destruction is deserved punishment from God. The recognition gives grounds for hope that God is still with her.
- A prophecy of restoration (7:11–13): Fallen Jerusalem is promised that she will be rebuilt and that her power will be greater than ever (a contrast with the vision of peace in 4:1–5).
- A prayer for future prosperity (7:14–17): The mood switches from a request for power to grateful astonishment at God's mercy. Hermann Gunkel and Bo Reicke identify the last chapter as a ritual text possibly connected to a festival such as the Israelite New Year.
- A hymn of praise for the incomparable God (7:18-20): the Confraternity of Christian Doctrine in the United States notes that these final verses "contain a hymn of praise for the incomparable God, who pardons sin and delights in mercy".

== Themes ==
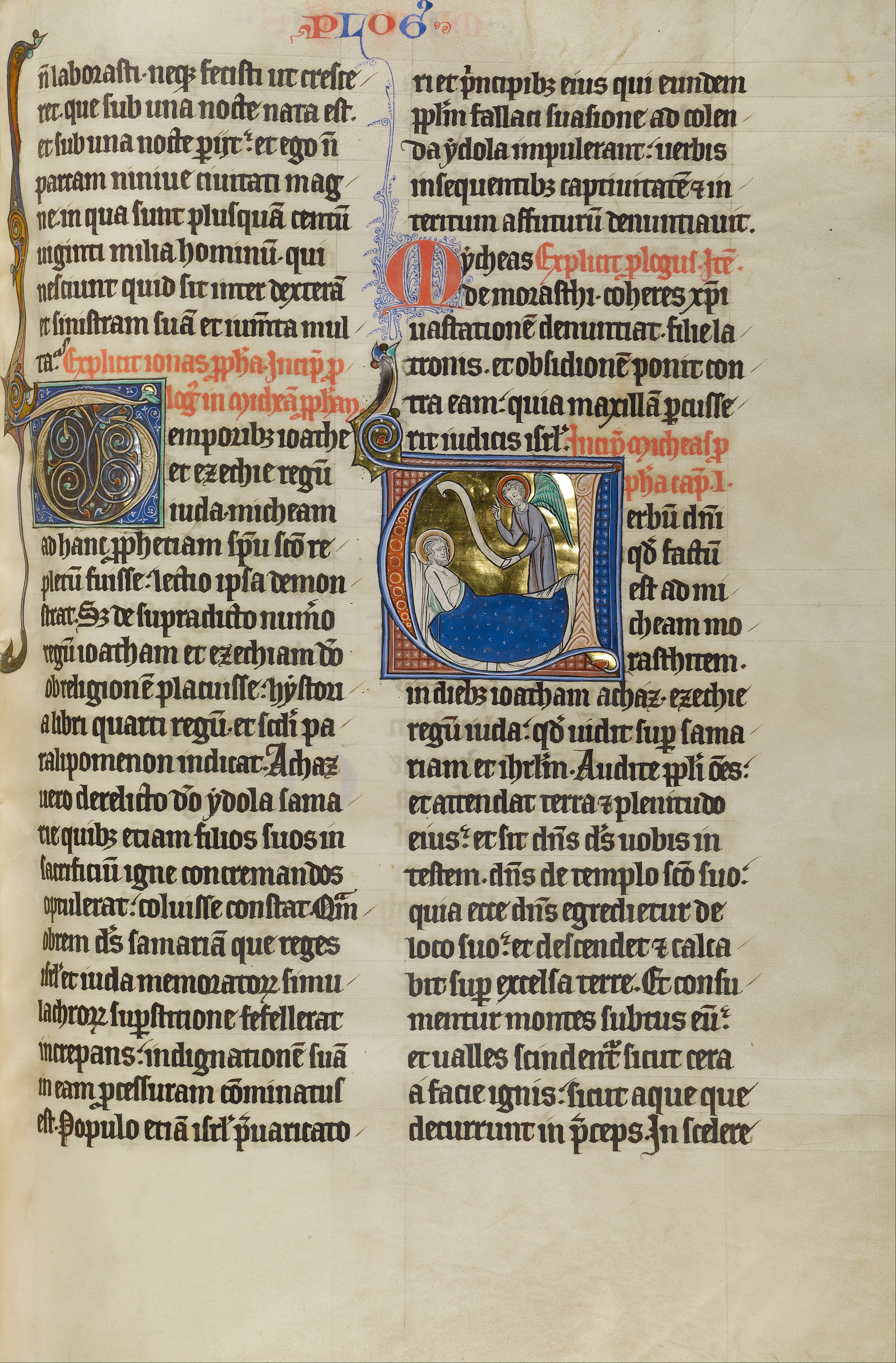
In this Bible from about 1270, an initial V introduces the Old Testament book of Micah. The scene inside the letter illustrates the following text: "The word of the Lord that came to Micah the Morasthite..." The illuminator added details not mentioned in the text to his representation of the scene, showing the prophet Micah in bed while an angel, its hand raised in a gesture of speech, delivers the "word of the Lord" represented by a scroll.

Micah addresses the future of Judah/Israel after the Babylonian exile. Like Isaiah, the book has a vision of the punishment of Israel and creation of a "remnant", followed by world peace centered on Zion under the leadership of a new Davidic monarch; the people should do justice, turn to Yahweh, and await the end of their punishment. However, whereas Isaiah sees Jacob/Israel joining "the nations" under Yahweh's rule, Micah looks forward to Israel ruling over the nations. Insofar as Micah appears to draw on and rework parts of Isaiah, it seems designed at least partly to provide a counterpoint to that book.

== Allusions in the New Testament ==
There are several allusions to the Book of Micah in the New Testament:

- Matthew's Gospel quotes from the Book of Micah in relation to Jesus being born in Bethlehem:

And they said unto him, In Bethlehem of Judæa: for thus it is written by the prophet, And thou Bethlehem, in the land of Juda, art not the least among the princes of Juda: for out of thee shall come a Governor, that shall rule my people Israel.

— Matthew 2:5–6

But thou, Bethlehem Ephratah, though thou be little among the thousands of Judah, yet out of thee shall he come forth unto me that is to be ruler in Israel; whose goings forth have been from of old, from everlasting.

— Micah 5:2

- Jesus' words in Matthew 10:36 reflect Micah's warning that families will be divided:

A man’s enemies will be those of his own household.

— Matthew 10:36

For the son dishonoureth the father, the daughter riseth up against her mother, the daughter in law against her mother in law; a man's enemies are the men of his own house.

— Micah 7:6

Although the wording is different, Jerome comments that "we should always take note when a passage is cited out of the Old Testament, whether the sense only, or the very words are given".

- John's Gospel has a possible allusion to the identification of the mysterious "him" that God causes to see marvels or marvelous things:

For the Father loveth the Son, and sheweth him all things that himself doeth: and he will shew him greater works than these, that ye may marvel.

— John 5:20

According to the days of thy coming out of the land of Egypt will I shew unto him marvellous things.

— Micah 7:15

== See also ==
- Zion

== Bibliography ==
- Allen, Leslie C (1976). The Books of Joel, Obadiah, Jonah, and Micah. Eerdmans. ISBN 978-0802825315. "Micah"
- Ben Zvi, Ehud (2000). Micah. Eerdmans. ISBN 978-0802845993.
- Coogan, Michael (2009). A Brief Introduction to the Old Testament. Oxford University Press.
- Fitzmyer, Joseph A. (2008). A Guide to the Dead Sea Scrolls and Related Literature. Grand Rapids, Michigan: William B. Eerdmans Publishing Company. ISBN 9780802862419.
- Grigg, Donald L (2006). The Bible from Scratch: The Old Testament for Beginners. Eerdmans. ISBN 978-0664225773.
- King, Phillip J (2006). HarperCollins Study Bible: Micah. Harper Collins Publishers.
- King, Philip J (1988). Amos, Hosea, Micah: an archaeological commentary. Westminster John Knox Press. ISBN 978-0664240776.
- Limburg, James (1988). Hosea-Micah. Westminster John Knox Press. ISBN 978-0664237578.
- Mays, James L (1976). Micah. Westminster John Knox Press. ISBN 978-0664208172.
- Rogerson, John W. (2003). "Micah". In James D. G. Dunn, John William Rogerson (ed.). Eerdmans Bible Commentary. Eerdmans. ISBN 978-0802837110.
- Sweeney, Marvin A (2000). The Twelve Prophets. Liturgical Press. ISBN 978-0814650912.
- Ulrich, Eugene, ed. (2010). The Biblical Qumran Scrolls: Transcriptions and Textual Variants. Brill. ISBN 9789004181830.
- Würthwein, Ernst (1995). The Text of the Old Testament. Translated by Rhodes, Erroll F. Grand Rapids, MI: Wm. B. Eerdmans. ISBN 0-8028-0788-7.

Book of Micah Minor prophets
Preceded by Jonah	Hebrew Bible	Succeeded by Nahum
Preceded by Jonah	Christian; Old Testament	Succeeded by Nahum
