= Succoth-benoth =

Babylonian deity

Succoth-benoth or Succoth Benoth (Hebrew: סֻכּוֹת בְּנוֹת, romanized: Huts of Daughters) was a Babylonian deity, one of the gods brought to the Kingdom of Israel (Samaria) during the Neo-Babylonian Empire. In the ninth year of Hoshea, "the king of Assyria took Samaria, and carried Israel away into Assyria, and placed them in Halah and in Habor by the river of Gozan, and in the cities of the Medes", resettling large numbers of population. (2 Kings 17:6)

The "men" from each of these five cities set up their gods in the shrines of the land, mixing it with the worship of Yahweh. "The men of Babylon made Succoth Benoth, the men of Cuthah made Nergal, the men of Hamath made Ashima, the Avvites made Nibhaz and Tartak, and the Sepharvites ... Adrammelech and Anammelech." (2 Kings 17:30-31) The Bible says that these deities were idols, although the Samaritans were not punished because they worshipped the God of the Israelites as well.

The identity of Succoth-benoth is unknown. Hayim Tawil noted that Bànitu (Akkadian: 𒁀𒉌𒌈 Ba.ni.TUM, "the female creature") was an epithet of Ishtar in Nineveh, and postulated the name "Succoth-benoth" was a Hebrew rendition of a Neo-Babylonian or Neo-Assyrian divine name meaning "the image of Bànitu".

According to b. Sanhedrin, Succoth Benoth was a hen; according to the Jerusalem Talmud, Avoda Zara, a hen and her chicks, thus associating this god with the astrological constellation Pleiades. According to commentators, either sukkot is a foreign word for "hen" and the phrase means "hen of chicks" or the entire phrase is a foreign word for "hen". Marcus Jastrow proposed that the phrase is native to Hebrew and should be read "covering the young".

== See also ==
- Saĝkud
- Sakkuth (disambiguation)
- Succoth (disambiguation)
