= Amos 5 =

- ← chapter 4 chapter 6 →
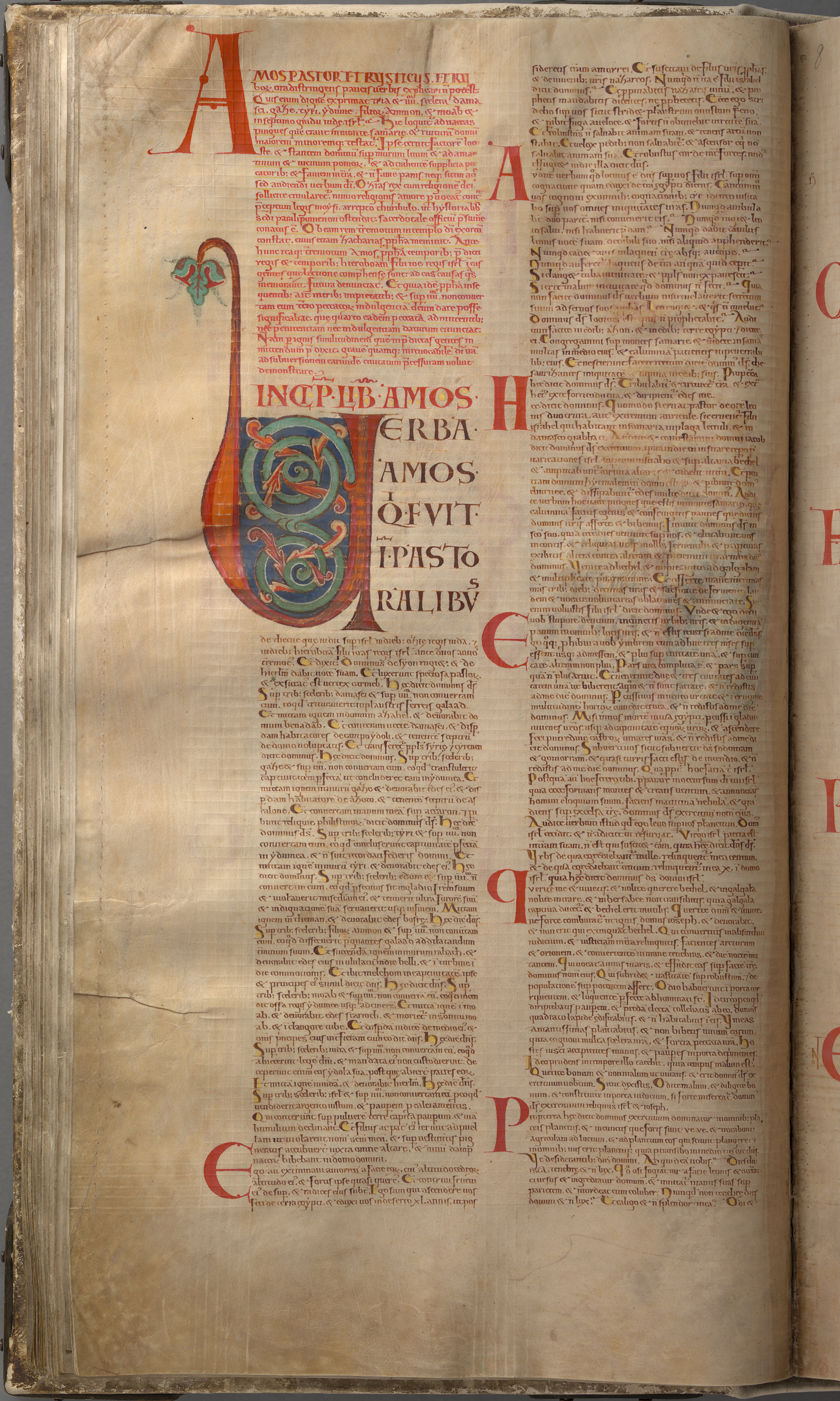
- Book of Amos (1:1–5:21) in Latin in Codex Gigas, made around 13th century.
- Book: Book of Amos
- Category: Nevi'im
- Christian Bible part: Old Testament
- Order in the Christian part: 30

Amos 5 is the fifth chapter of the Book of Amos in the Hebrew Bible or the Old Testament of the Christian Bible. In the Hebrew Bible it is a part of the Book of the Twelve Minor Prophets. The Book of Amos contains the prophecies attributed to the prophet Amos, including in this chapter a lamentation for Israel (Amos 5:1–3), an exhortation to repentance (Amos 5:4–20), and God's rejection of their hypocritical service (Amos 5:21–27).

== Text ==
The original text was written in Hebrew. This chapter is divided into 27 verses. Some early manuscripts containing the text of this chapter in Hebrew are of the Masoretic Text tradition, which includes the Codex Cairensis (895), the Petersburg Codex of the Prophets (916), Aleppo Codex (10th century), and Codex Leningradensis (1008).

Fragments containing parts of this chapter were found among the Dead Sea Scrolls, including 4Q82 (4QXII^{g}; 25 BCE) with extant verses 1–2, 9–18.

There is also a translation into Koine Greek known as the Septuagint, made in the last few centuries BCE. Extant ancient manuscripts of the Septuagint version include the Codex Vaticanus (B; $\mathfrak{G}$^{B}; 4th century), Codex Alexandrinus (A; $\mathfrak{G}$^{A}; 5th century), and Codex Marchalianus (Q; $\mathfrak{G}$^{Q}; 6th century). (Note: The extant Codex Sinaiticus currently does not have the whole Book of Amos.)

== Structure ==
There are various ways in which this chapter has been divided, for example the New King James Version divides it into three sections:

- Amos 5:1–3 = A Lament for Israel
- Amos 5:4–15 = A Call to Repentance
- Amos 5:16–27 = The Day of the Lord.

== Verse 1 ==
Hear this word that I take up over you in lamentation, O house of Israel.

Like Amos 3:1, 4:1 and 8:4, the imperative word "Hear" in this verse marks the start of a new section within the book.

== Verse 2 ==
The virgin of Israel has fallen;
She will rise no more.
She lies forsaken on her land;
There is no one to raise her up.

The "virgin of Israel", in this and several other translations, uses the appositive genitive form of expression: the virgin is the nation. She is carried off by death before she has experienced married life. The image of a "fallen nation" is reversed in Amos 9:11.

== Verse 24 ==
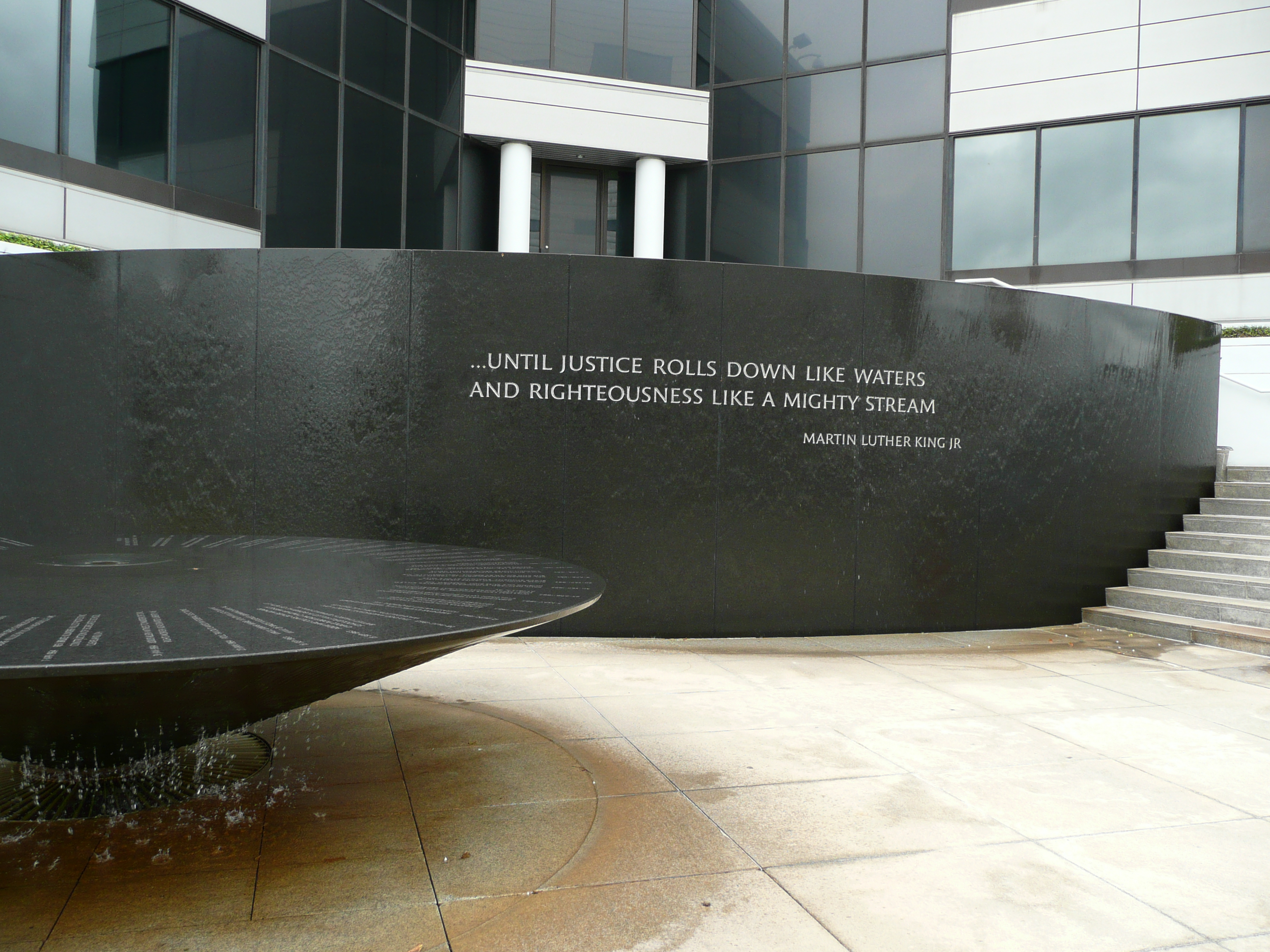
The words spoken by Dr. Martin Luther King Jr., a citation from Amos 5:24, inscribed in the Civil Rights Memorial in Montgomery, Alabama.

But let justice roll down as waters,

and righteousness as a mighty stream.

Martin Luther King Jr. cited this verse in his memorable "I Have a Dream" speech (August 28, 1963 in Washington, D.C.).

== Verse 26 ==
But ye have borne the tabernacle of your Moloch

and Chiun your images, the star of your god,

which ye made to yourselves.

=== Verse 26 in Hebrew ===
Masoretic text:

ונשאתם את סכות מלככם ואת כיון צלמיכם כוכב אלהיכם אשר עשיתם לכם׃

Transliteration:

ū-nə-śā-ṯem ’êṯ sik-kūṯ mal-kə-ḵem, wə-’êṯ kî-yūn ṣal-mê-ḵem, kō-w-ḵaḇ ’ĕ-lō-hê-ḵem, ’ă-sher ‘ă-shî-ṯem lā-ḵem

=== Sakkuth ===
English translations of Amos 5:26 render the Hebrew word סִכּוּת as a direct Romanisation: Sakkuth, Sikkuth, or Siccuth. There is some ambiguity about whether Sakkuth is a name, a generic word for a deity, or a word referring to a portable shrine. The King James Version translates Sakkuth as "tabernacle".

==== Saĝkud ====
It has been suggested that Sakkuth mentioned in verse 5:26, might be the same deity as Mesopotamian Saĝkud. The Masoretic Text vocalizes the name, written in Hebrew as skwt, as sikkût, a hapax legomenon. The conclusion that a deity is meant is not universally accepted, and as an alternative it has been proposed that the correct reading might be a common noun such as sukkat, "hut", or a derivative of the term sikkāntu, "stele".

=== Moloch ===
Verse 5:26 also mentions Moloch in some translations. Moloch corresponds to "your king" in other English versions.

"But ye have borne": Literally, "And ye bare the tabernacle of your Moloch" (literally, "your king," from where the idol Moloch had its name.) He declares the reason why he denied that they had sacrificed to God in the wilderness. "Did ye offer sacrifices unto Me, and ye bare?" The two were incompatible. Since they did "carry about the tabernacle of their king", they did not really worship God. He whom they chose as "their king" was their god.

"The tabernacle of your Moloch": τὴν σκηνὴν τοῦ Μολόχ (Septuagint); tabernaculum Moloch vestro (Vulgate). The Hebrew word rendered "tabernacle" (sikkuth), which is found nowhere else, has been explained in a variety of ways. Aquila gives συσκιασμούς: Theodotion, "vision," reading the whole sentence thus: Καὶ ἤρατε τὴν ὅρασιν τοῦ Θεοῦ ὑμῶν ὑμῶν ἄστρον τοῦ Θεοῦ ὑμῶν. Many moderns render this as "stake," "column," or "shrine." Others suppose it to be equivalent to Sakkuth, an Assyrian name for Molech (or Adar), but this is uncertain (see 'Studien und Kritiken.' 1874, p. 887). The parallelism requires the word to be an appellative and not a proper name. It most probably means "shrine", a portable shrine, like those spoken of in Acts 19:24 in connection with the worship of Diana. The Syriac and Arabic versions call it a "tent", and thus the reproach stands forth emphatically that, instead of, or in conjunction with, the true tabernacle, they bore aloft, as if proud of their apostasy, the tabernacle of a false god. Such shrines were used by the Egyptians, according to Herodotus (2:63; see Rawlinson's note) and Diod. Sic. (1:97). Many such shrines may be seen in the Egyptian room of the British Museum. Keil quotes Drumann, 'On the Rosetta Inscription', p. 211, "These were small chapels, generally gilded and ornamented with flowers and in other ways, intended to hold a small idol when processions were made, and to be carried or driven about with it." Hence, Egypt was likely the source of this idolatry.

=== The star of your god ===
"The star of your god": The Jamieson-Fausset-Brown Bible Commentary refers to 15th-century rabbi Isaac Karo on this line, saying that astrologers commonly associated Saturn with Israel. The commentary further speculates that there may have been a star on the idol's head representing Saturn, and draws a connection with a star in hieroglyphics representing God.

=== Chiun, Chevan, and Saturn ===
"Chiun": This is the same as "Chevan", which in the Arabic and Persic languages is the name of "Saturn", as noted by Aben Ezra and Kimchi. It is so rendered by Montanus. In Egyptian, it was called Revan, Rephan, or Remphan. It is also in the Septuagint, and in Acts 7:43; some read it "Cavan", and take it to signify a "cake". It is this sense of the word that is used in Jeremiah 7:18: "the cake of your images". In Jeremiah, it is supposed that the "cake" had the image of the gods impressed upon it. Antoine Augustin Calmet interprets it as "the pedestal of your images", and others have also translated it this way. The term is applicable to Moloch (Mo) "their king", a king being the basis and foundation of the kingdom and people, and to the sun, often seen as a deity. Some take Mo and Chiun to be distinct deities, the one to be the sun, and the other the moon. However, they seem to be the same, and both to be the Egyptian ox and the calf of the Israelites in the wilderness. These types of image were carried in portable tents or tabernacles, in chests or shrines (such as the Succothbenoth, or tabernacles of Venus (2 Kings 17:30) and those of Diana (Acts 19:24).

== Verse 27 ==
Therefore will I cause you to go into captivity beyond Damascus,

saith the Lord, whose name is The God of hosts.

This verse plays an important role in the Damascus Document, an important Essene text from among the Dead Sea Scrolls.

== See also ==
- Related Bible parts: Job 9, Job 38, Amos 3, Amos 4
- Beersheba
- Bethel
- Chiun
- Damascus
- Gilgal
- Israel
- Joseph (Genesis)
- Moloch
- Orion (constellation)
- Pleiades
- Wormwood (Bible)
