= Amos 6 =

Sixth chapter of the Book of Amos in the Bible

- ← chapter 5 chapter 7 →
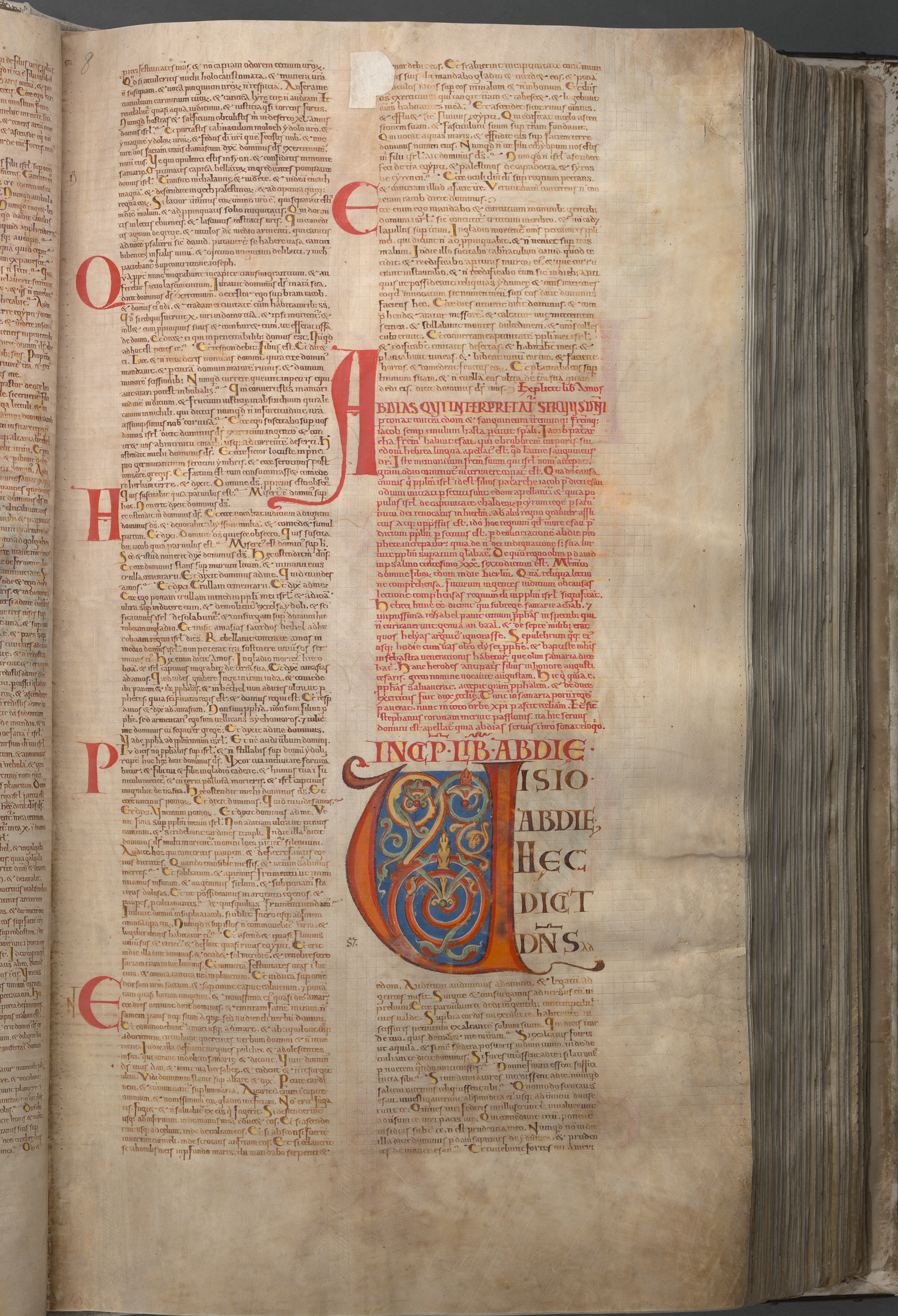
- Book of Amos (5:21–9:15) in Latin in Codex Gigas, made around 13th century.
- Book: Book of Amos
- Category: Nevi'im
- Christian Bible part: Old Testament
- Order in the Christian part: 30

Amos 6 is the sixth chapter of the Book of Amos in the Hebrew Bible or the Old Testament of the Christian Bible. In the Hebrew Bible it is a part of the Book of the Twelve Minor Prophets. This book contains the prophecies attributed to the prophet Amos. The Jamieson-Fausset-Brown Bible Commentary summarises this chapter as

[a] denunciation of both the sister nations (Note: Meaning the Kingdom of Israel (Samaria) and the Kingdom of Judah.) (especially their nobles) for wanton security — Zion, as well as Samaria: threat of the exile: ruin of their palaces and slaughter of the people: their perverse injustice.

Whereas chapter 5 condemns the conduct of worship in Israel without justice, in chapter 6 "we are taken from the public worship of the people to the private banquets of the rich, but ... only in order to have their security and extravagance contrasted with the pestilence, the war, and the captivity that are rapidly approaching".

== Text ==
The original text was written in Hebrew. This chapter is divided into 14 verses. Some early manuscripts containing the text of this chapter in Hebrew are of the Masoretic Text tradition, which includes the Codex Cairensis (895), the Petersburg Codex of the Prophets (916), Aleppo Codex (10th century), Codex Leningradensis (1008).

Fragments containing parts of this chapter were found among the Dead Sea Scrolls including 4Q78 (4QXII^{c}; 75–50 BCE) with extant verses 13–14; and 4Q82 (4QXII^{g}; 25 BCE) with extant verses 1–4, 6–14.

There is also a translation into Koine Greek known as the Septuagint, made in the last few centuries BCE. Extant ancient manuscripts of the Septuagint version include Codex Vaticanus (B; $\mathfrak{G}$^{B}; 4th century), Codex Alexandrinus (A; $\mathfrak{G}$^{A}; 5th century) and Codex Marchalianus (Q; $\mathfrak{G}$^{Q}; 6th century). (Note: The extant Codex Sinaiticus currently does not have the whole Book of Amos.)

== Verse 1 ==
Woe to them that are at ease in Zion,

and trust in the mountain of Samaria,

which are named chief of the nations,

to whom the house of Israel came!

- "Them that are at ease in Zion": living in fancied security and self-pleasing (Isaiah 32:9, 11; Zephaniah 1:12). Judah is included in the denunciation, because she is equally guilty; the whole covenant nation is sunk in the same dangerous apathy. Septuagint, τοῖς ἐξουθενοῦσι Σιών, "them that set at naught Zion." The same rendering is found in the Syriac, and can be supported by a small change in the Hebrew. It may have been intended thus to confine the announcement to Israel alone, in conformity with the prophet's chief scope. But he has introduced mention of Judah elsewhere, as Amos 2:4; Amos 6:5; Amos 9:11, and his sense of his own people's careless ease may well lead him to include them in his warning.
- "Trust in the mountain of Samaria": Not in God. Samaria was strong (see Amos 3:9), resisted for three years, and was the last city of Israel which was taken. "The king of Assyria came up throughout all the land and went up to Samaria, and besieged it (2 Kings 17:5). Benhadad, in that former siege, when God delivered them 2 Kings 7:6, attempted no assault, but famine only.
- "Which are named the chief of the nations": the persons at ease in Zion, and trusted in Samaria, were the principal men of both nations, Judah and Israel; or these cities of Zion and Samaria were the chief of the said nations: Zion, Which was near Jerusalem, and includes it, was the metropolis of Judea; as Samaria was the head city of Ephraim, or the ten tribes. The Targum is, that "put the name of their children, as the name of the children of the nations;" as the Jews did in later times, giving their children the names of Alexander, Antipater, etc.
- "To whom the house of Israel came": or "to which places all Israel had recourse"; so the two tribes went up to Zion, the ten tribes went to Samaria: or, to whom, i.e. to which nobles and rulers, the people of each kingdom did go on all occasions for judgment, counsel, or refuge.

== Verse 11 ==
See, the Lord commands,

and the great house shall be shattered to bits,
and the little house to pieces.

Biblical translator Jerome interprets "the great house" as Israel and "the small house" as Judah.

== See also ==
- Arabah
- Calneh
- David
- Gath
- Hamath
- Israel
- Jacob
- Joseph
- Philistine
- Samaria
- YHWH
- Zion
- Related Bible parts: Amos 3, Amos 4, Amos 5

== Sources ==
- Collins, John J. (2014). Introduction to the Hebrew Scriptures. Fortress Press. ISBN 9781451469233.
- Fitzmyer, Joseph A. (2008). A Guide to the Dead Sea Scrolls and Related Literature. Grand Rapids, MI: William B. Eerdmans Publishing Company. ISBN 9780802862419.
- Hayes, Christine (2015). Introduction to the Bible. Yale University Press. ISBN 978-0300188271.
- Ulrich, Eugene, ed. (2010). The Biblical Qumran Scrolls: Transcriptions and Textual Variants. Brill.
- Würthwein, Ernst (1995). The Text of the Old Testament. Translated by Rhodes, Erroll F. Grand Rapids, MI: Wm. B. Eerdmans. ISBN 0-8028-0788-7.
