= Molok =

Molok may refer to:

- Tiddalik the frog
- Molok, Iran
- Molok, album by Gazpacho
- Molok, finnish company
- Moloch, an ancient Canaanite god

== See also ==
- Moloch (disambiguation)
