= Kiwan =

Planet Saturn in Mandaeism

- Member of the Seven Planets
- Other names: Bar Shamish ('son of Shamish')
- Affiliation: Saturday and Judaism; Kentaeans
- Abode: World of Darkness
- Planet: Saturn
- Parents: Ruha and Ur

Equivalents
- Akkadian: Kajamanu

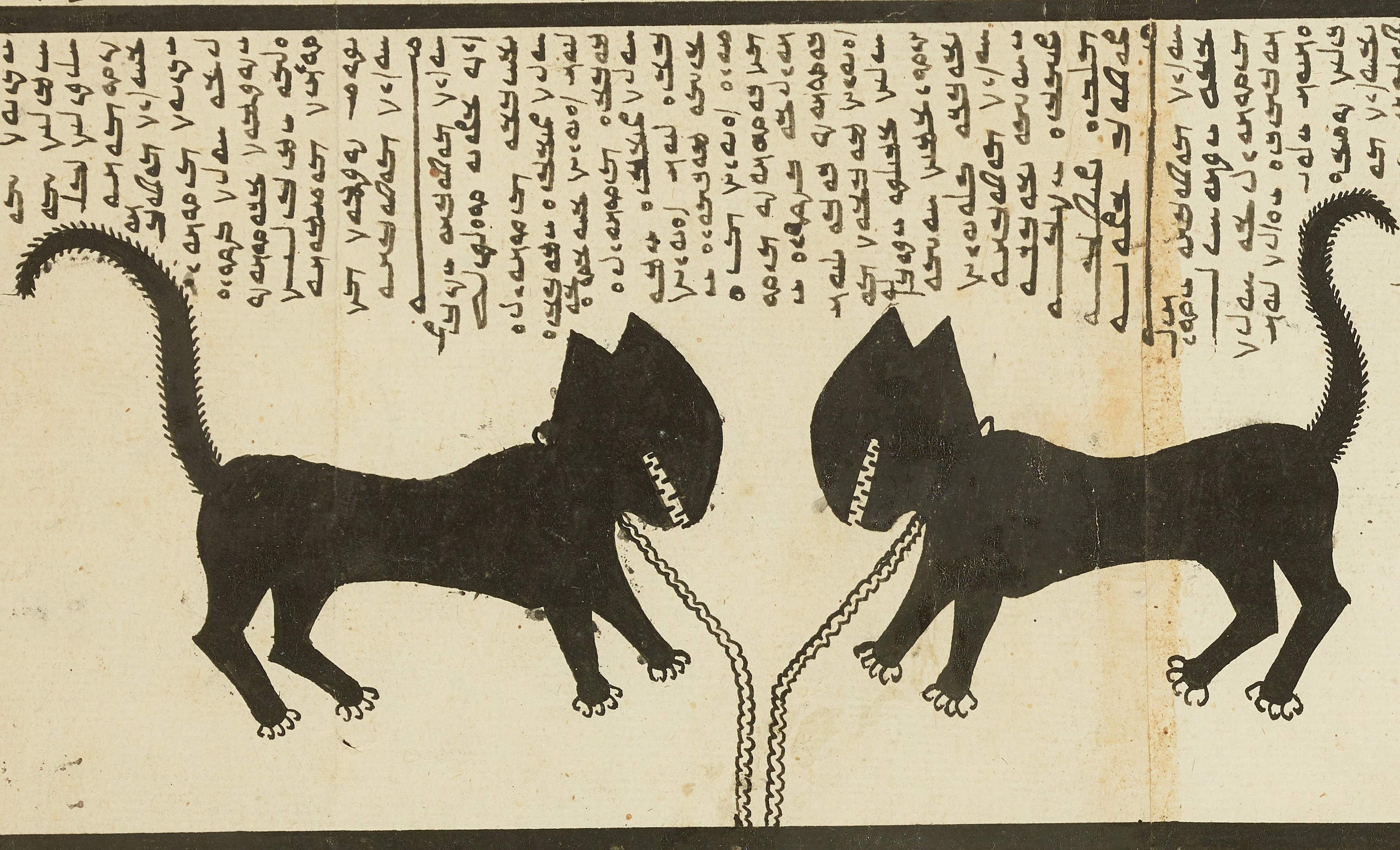
Drawing of two lions in the maṭarta of Kiwan. From the Scroll of Abatur (MS DC 8).

In Mandaeism, Kiwan, Kiuan (Classical Mandaic: ࡊࡉࡅࡀࡍ; Persian: کیوان), or Kewan is the Mandaic name for the planet Saturn. Kiwan is one of the seven planets (Classical Mandaic: ࡔࡅࡁࡀ, romanized: šuba, lit. 'The Seven'), who are part of the entourage of Ruha in the World of Darkness.

Kiwan, who is associated with Saturday as well as Judaism, is also called Br Šamiš (Bar Shamish, lit. 'The Son of the Sun'). Kiwan's name is derived from the Akkadian Kajamānu.

Near the end of Book 3 and at the beginning of Book 9.1 in the Right Ginza, Kiwan is identified with the Kiwanaiia (followers of Kiwan), who are generally equated with the Kentaeans, a related Gnostic sect.

== See also ==
- Kajamanu
- Kayvan
- Remphan
- Ninurta
- Kentaeans
