= Sakkuth (disambiguation) =

Sakkuth, Sikkuth, or Siccuth (Biblical Hebrew: סִכּוּת) may refer to:

== Religion and mythology ==
- The Romanisation of סִכּוּת from verse 5:26 of the Book of Amos
- Saĝkud, a Mesopotamian deity speculated to correspond to Sakkuth in Amos 5:26

== Popular culture ==
- Sakkuth, a melodic metal band from Australia.

== See also ==
- Succoth (disambiguation)
- Sukkot (Modern Hebrew סוכות or Hebrew with niqud: סֻכּוֹת)
- Moloch (also mentioned in Amos 5:26)
- Moloch (disambiguation)
