= Second Austrian Assessment Report on Climate Change =

2025 review of climate change consensus

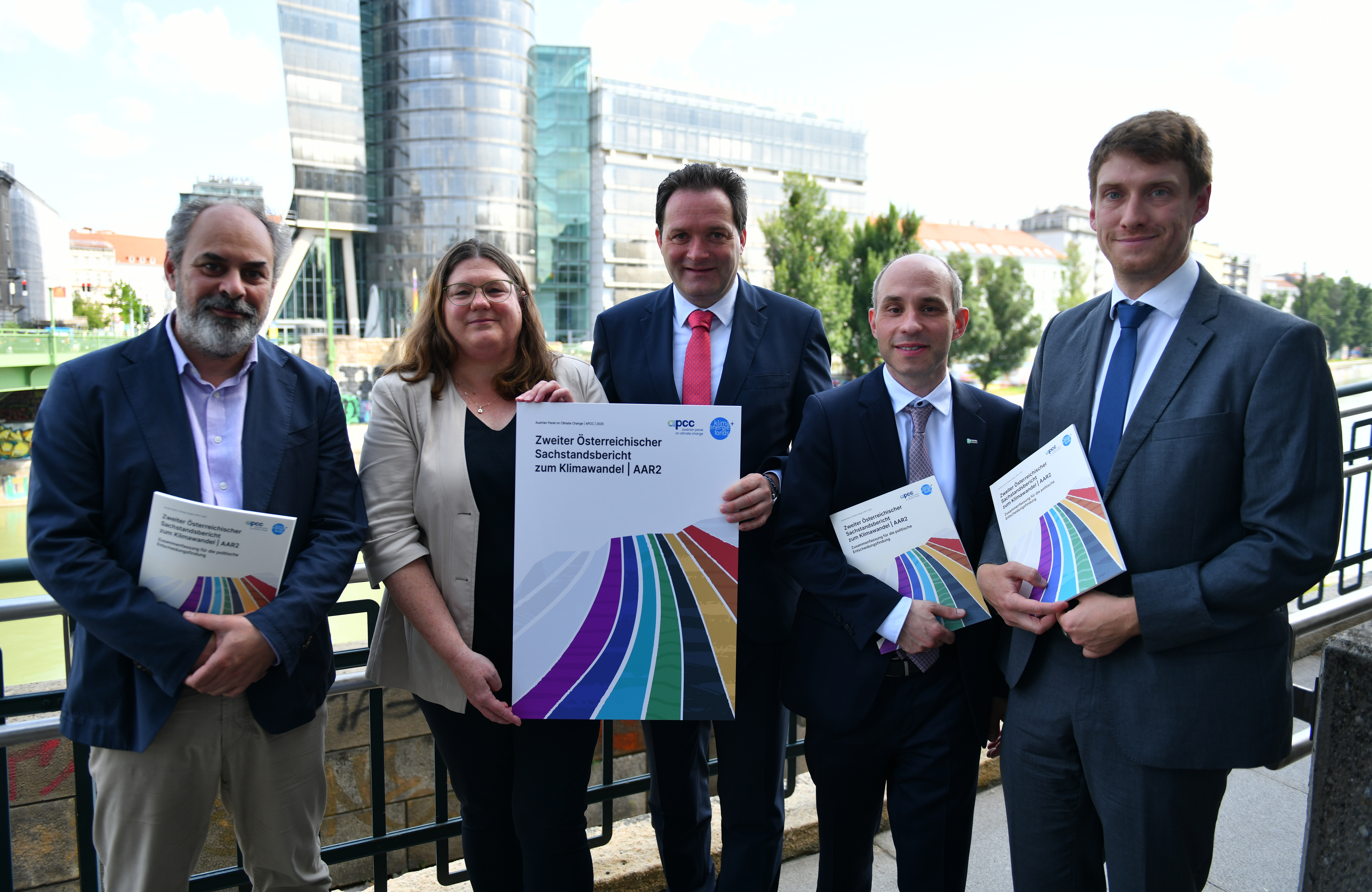
The chairpersons of the report Huppmann, Keiler, Riahi and Rieder with federal minister Totschnig at the publication in June 2025

The Second Austrian Assessment Report on Climate Change (AAR2) by the Austrian Panel on Climate Change (APCC) of the Climate Change Center Austria (CCCA) is a systematic review of the Scientific consensus on climate change with regard to the effects on Austria. The report is based on the assessment reports of the Intergovernmental Panel on Climate Change, the first report of the APCC was published in 2014. On several hundred pages, the APCC Assessment Report summarizes the current state of scientific knowledge on global warming (climate change), its consequences for Austria, Climate change mitigation and possible adaptation strategies to global warming for Austria.

The AAR2 was published in Vienna on June 17, 2025. It was written by around 200 authors who evaluated more than 5000 scientific articles, manuscripts and studies over several years and considered over 4000 comments from more than 150 external reviewers in a multi-stage peer review process.

== Background ==
Based on the Intergovernmental Panel on Climate Change (IPCC), the Austrian Panel on Climate Change (APCC) was established in 2014 under the auspices of the CCCA. It published the first Austrian Assessment Report on Climate Change (AAR14) in 2014.On July 7, 2022, the APCC published the list of lead authors of the Second Austrian Assessment Report. The co-chairs of the report are Daniel Huppmann, Margreth Keiler, Keywan Riahi and Harald Rieder.

The full report is approximately 800 pages long. To write the report, the approximately 200 authors reviewed more than 5000 scientific articles, manuscripts and studies listed on the Web of Science that have been published since the publication of the First Assessment Report in 2014.

The report was funded by the Climate and Energy Fund with funds from the Ministry of Climate Action.

As with the IPCC reports, the AAR2 does not make any explicit policy recommendations. Instead, it presents and compares different options for reducing greenhouse gas emissions and adapting to the consequences of climate change. Particular attention is paid to possible synergies and conflicting goals between climate protection and adaptation measures on the one hand and other social goals, in particular the UN Sustainable Development Goals (SDGs), on the other.

== Structure ==
=== Chapters ===
The report is divided in eight chapters:

- Chapter 1: Physical and ecological manifestation of climate change in Austria
- Chapter 2: Climate change, land use, ecosystem services and health
- Chapter 3: Built environments and mobility
- Chapter 4: Provision of goods and services in a climate-resilient economy via materials, energy and work
- Chapter 5: Navigating demand-side transformations to achieve net zero through human decisions and behavior
- Chapter 6: Climate governance: Political, legal, economic and societal aspects
- Chapter 7: The Austrian Alps as multi-dimensional focal area
- Chapter 8: Transformation pathways

=== Summary for policymakers ===
In addition to the main report, a Summary for Policymakers (SPM) was also published. This is structured according to the following five policy-relevant key questions:

- A. Is Austria on track for climate neutrality?
- B. What are the impacts of climate change in Austria?
- C. Which mitigation options are available?
- D. How can Austria meet climate targets?
- E. Which policies can support effective and equitable climate governance?
