= Saĝkud =

Mesopotamian deity

- Divine tax collector
- Major cult center: Der, Bubê

Genealogy
- Spouse: Ninpamulesi

Saĝkud was a Mesopotamian god who might have been regarded as a divine tax collector or as a warrior deity. He belonged to the court of Anu, though an association between him and Ninurta is also attested. He is first attested in the Early Dynastic period, and appears in a variety of theophoric names from sites such as Lagash and later on Sippar. In the first millennium BCE he was worshiped in Der and Bubê. In the past it was assumed that skwt ("Sakkuth") mentioned in the Book of Amos might be the same deity, but this conclusion is no longer universally accepted.

== Name and character ==
The correct reading of the theonym written in cuneiform as ^{d}Saĝ-kud has been established based on syllabic spellings such as sag-gu-ud and sa-ak-ku-ud in sources postdating the earliest Early Dynastic attestations. Romanizations such as Sakkud and Sakkut can also be found in contemporary scholarly literature. It is possible that the name can be explained as "he who collects first" or "he who collects best". Other translations include "tax collector" or terms such as "shark" (in the metaphorical sense), "cutthroat", "head chopper". Gebhard J. Selz considers him one of the deities who should be understood as divine representations of specific professions, in this case specifically that of a tax collector. Ryan D. Winters suggest he functioned as a warrior god.

A seal from the Old Babylonian period describes Saĝkud as "foremost in heaven and earth, wrapped in divine splendour" (pa_{4} gal an-ki-a ní me-lám gú è-a). He might have been understood as an astral deity. However, the old theory that he was associated with the planet Saturn is no longer accepted today, as it relied on a faulty reading of an enumeration of deities in Šurpu. Identification as a divine representation of Sirius has been suggested based on association between him and Ninurta, but it remains speculative. A text describing him as the resident of a swamp is also known. According to Manfred Krebernik most of the other figures mentioned in it are likely asakku demons.

A text presumably pertaining to rites of the āšipu states that two types of stones used in magical rituals, pappardilû and engiša, were associated with Saĝkud.

== Associations with other deities ==
Manfred Krebernik suggests that the goddess Gula, who appears after Saĝkud in the Early Dynastic god list from Abu Salabikh, might have been viewed as his wife. She is to be distinguished from the homophonous medicine goddess Gula, and usually it is assumed that her spouse was the god Abu. According to the god list An = Anum, the goddess Ninpamulesi was regarded as Saĝkud's wife. Her name can be explained as "the lady who sparkles red in the Pleiades". An alternate proposal is that the element pa-mul might refer to tree branches.

It is presumed that Saĝkud belonged to the court of Anu. An = Anum refers to him as zabar-dab-an-na-ke, "zabbardabbû official of Anu" or "zabbardabbû official of heaven". Krebernik argues this title can be explained as "chamberlain" or "cupbearer". However, Ryan D. Winters points out that based on its literal meaning, "keeper of bronze", possibly implicitly "keeper of bronze weapons", this position might have had a military character, which would match Saĝkud's proposed role as a warrior god.

An association between Saĝkud and Ninurta is also attested. However, only a single text directly equates them with each other. The Weidner god list places him between two related deities, Ningirsu and Pisangunug. Two late copies of this text equate him with the god Etallak, in this context explained as a divine jailer.

According to Gebhard J. Selz, the deity ^{d}Lugal-kud-da known from Early Dynastic Zame Hymns might be related to Saĝkud.

== Worship ==
Saĝkud is already attested in texts from Early Dynastic Fara and Lagash, though in the latter corpus he only appears in a single theophoric name, Amar-Saĝkud ("bull calf of Saĝkud"). In the Ur III period he is attested in the name Ur-Saĝkud, many further examples are also known from the Old Babylonian period: Ibni-Saĝkud, Puzur-Saĝkud, Saĝkud-muballiṭ (all three from Sippar), Nūr-Saĝkud, Saĝkud-balāṭī, Saĝkud-bāni and Saĝkud-tajjār, with a bearer of the last of them also designated as a servant of Saĝkud on a seal. A temple dedicated to him existed in Ur during the reign of Rim-Sîn I, but its ceremonial name is not known.

In the Neo-Assyrian period, a hypostasis of Saĝkud associated with the city of Bubê was worshiped in Der. Bubê was presumably located nearby, in Araši or Raši, which according to Eckhart Frahm was a buffer state between Mesopotamia and Elam. It is also mentioned in the myth of Anzû (tablet III, line 150), which indicates that a temple named Enimmanku was located there.

According to Andrew R. George, this ceremonial name can be translated as "high house of pure heaven", but it is not known what deity was worshiped in it, with "Ninurta or a similar deity" being a plausible assumption. Texts from the reign of Shamshi-Adad V indicate that during a campaign against Der, either in 815 or 814 BCE, Assyrian troops carried away the statue of Saĝkud of Bubê alongside those of other local deities, such as Ištaran, Mār-bīti and Šarrat-Deri. They were later returned by Esarhaddon.

== Outside Mesopotamia ==
In a trilingual version of the Weidner god list from Ugarit, both in the Ugaritic and Hurrian columns the deity corresponding to Saĝkud is Anat. However, it has been called into question if this text accurately reflects traditions pertaining to the Ugaritic and Hurrian pantheons, and it is assumed it does not indicate an equation between the deities mentioned.

It has been suggested that Sakkuth, mentioned in the Book of Amos 5:26, might be the same deity as Mesopotamian Saĝkud. The Masoretic Text vocalizes the name, written in Hebrew as skwt, as sikkût, a hapax legomenon. The conclusion that a deity is meant is not universally accepted, and as an alternative it has been proposed that the correct reading might be a common noun such as sukkat, "hut", or a derivative of the term sikkāntu, "stele".

Riekele Borger pointed out that a Šurpu passage formerly used to support the identification of skwt with Saĝkud was misread, and the sequence of words in it does not resemble the biblical passage, nor is Saĝkud anywhere associated with Kayyamānu, sometimes presumed to be related to Amos' Kewan. This conclusion is also accepted by Manfred Krebernik in Reallexikon der Assyriologie und Vorderasiatischen Archäologie.

== See also ==
- Sakkuth (disambiguation)
