= Kayvan =

Kayvan (also spelled Keyvan, Kayvon, Kaivon, Keivan, Kaywan, Kavon, or Kaevon Persian: کیوان) is a masculine given name and surname of Persian origin. It is a name for the planet Saturn. It is related to the word for Saturn in several ancient languages, including Kaimanu in Sumerian, Kajamānu in Akkadian, Kewwān in Syriac, Kiwan in Classical Mandaic, and "Kewan" (kywʾn') in Middle Persian. That a 16th-century high priest of Stakhr was named Azar Kayvan suggests that "Kayvan" was used as a name for a person in Iran as early as that time, particularly among followers of Zoroastrianism. To date "Kayvan" is a popular name among families following Zoroastrianism. Kayvan is distinct from the similar Persian word Kayhan, which means "universe", and is also used as a masculine given name. To English speakers, the spelling Kayvon is closest to the Persian pronunciation, [keivɒːn]. "Saturday", the day of Saturn, finds its Classical Persian equivalent in "Keyvānshid". Notable people with the name include:

== Given name ==
=== Kaevon ===
- Kaevon Merriweather (born 1999), American football player

=== Kayvan ===
- Kayvan Khalatbari (born 1983), American entrepreneur
- Kayvan Mirhadi (born 1960), Iranian composer
- Kayvan Najarian, Iranian scientist
- Kayvan Novak (born 1978), British actor

=== Kayvon ===
- Kayvon Thibodeaux (born 2000), American football player
- Kayvon Webster (born 1991), American football player
- Kayvon Zand, American musician

=== Kavon ===
- Kavon Frazier (born 1994), American football player
- Kavon Hakimzadeh (born 1968), Iranian-American rear admiral

=== Keivan ===
- Keivan Amraei (born 1986), Iranian footballer
- Keivan Ghanbarzadeh (born 1990), Iranian high jumper
- Keivan Saket (born 1961), Iranian composer
- Keivan Stassun (born 1972), American physicist and astronomer
- Keivan Zarineh (born 1985), Italian-Iranian footballer

=== Keyvan ===
- Keyvan Andres (born 2000), German-Iranian racing driver
- Keyvan Jenkins (born 1961), American football player
- Keyvan Khosrovani (1938–2026), Iranian architect, lighting designer, fashion designer, and couturier
- Keyvan Moghissi (1927–2025), Iranian-British cardiothoracic surgeon and professor
- Keyvan Mottaghian (born 2002), Afghan footballer
- Keyvan Rafiee, Iranian political activist
- Keyvan Shovir (born 1985), Iranian-American street artist
- Keyvan Vahdani (1991–2019), Iranian footballer

=== Keywan ===
- Keywan Karimi (born 1985), Iranian filmmaker
- Keywan Riahi, Austrian scientist

== Surname ==
=== Kayvan ===
- Azar Kayvan, Zoroastrian high priest of Istakhr and gnostic philosopher

=== Keyvan ===
- Anthony Keyvan (born 2000), American actor
- Morteza Keyvan (1921–1954), Iranian poet, art critic, newspaper editor, and political activist

== See also ==
- Kiwan in Mandaeism
- Remphan, the Septuagint form of Kayvan, mentioned in the Book of Acts
