= Succoth =

Succoth may mean:

- The Jewish festival of Sukkot.
- One of the stations, Sukkot (place), during the Israelite exodus from Egypt (Exodus 12:37), thought to be El Arish.
- Succoth, Argyll and Bute, a village in Argyll and Bute, Scotland
- Succoth-benoth, Babylonian deity
- The biblical site of Succoth in Transjordan (now Deir Alla)

== See also ==
- Sakkuth (disambiguation)
- Sukkot (Modern Hebrew סוכות or Hebrew with niqud: סֻכּוֹת)
