= Kajamanu =

Mesopotamian deity

Kajamānu
- Planet: Saturn
- Region: Mesopotamia

Equivalents
- Mandaean: Kiwan
- Persian: Kayvan

Kajamānu or Kayyamanu (Akkadian: 𒅗𒀀𒀀𒈠𒉡 ka-a-a-ma-nu "the constant") or Uduimin-saĝuš (Sumerian: 𒀯𒇻𒅂𒊕𒍑 ^{MUL}UDU.IMIN-saĝ-uš, "star of the sun") is the ancient Mesopotamian name for the planet Saturn. In ancient Mesopotamia, he was also regarded as the "star of Ninurta," the Mesopotamian fertility deity.

== In other cultures ==
Kiwan (Mandaic for Saturn) is derived from the Mesopotamian name. Kayvan is the Persian equivalent name.

Kēwān (Classical Syriac: ܟܹܐܘܵܢ) also being a loan from Akkadian, is the name for Saturn in Syriac among later Assyrians.

== See also ==
- Kayvan
- Kiwan
- List of Mesopotamian deities
- Ninurta
- Remphan
