= Kentaeans =

5th-century Gnostic religious group of Mesopotamia

The Kentaeans were a Gnostic religious group of Mesopotamia from around the 5th century AD. They were closely related to but distinct from the Mandaeans.

== Historical sources ==
The Kentaeans are mentioned near the end of Book 3 and at the beginning of Book 9.1 in the Right Ginza, as well as in Qulasta Prayer 357 (as Kiwanaiia (Kewānāye), i.e. the followers of Kiwan). The Ginza Rabba identifies the Kentaeans with Kiwan (Saturn) and criticizes them for their fasting. They are also mentioned by Arab historians such as Ibn al-Malāḥimī as the Kintānīya, while aš-Šahrastānī refers to them as the Kintawīya. Al-Masʿūdī briefly mentions them as the Kinṯāwīyūn.

References to both the Kentaeans and Mandaeans, who are always mentioned together with each other, can be found in three 6th-century Syriac Christian texts, namely the Cyrus of Edessa's Explanation for the Fasts, the Acts of Symeon bar Ṣabbāʿe, and the title of a lost work by Nathaniel of Šahrazur (d. 611 or 612), namely "A polemic against the Severans (Jacobites), Manichaeans, Kentaeans, and Mandaeans" (Drāšā haw d-luqbal Seweryāne w-Mənenāye w-Kentāye w-Mandāye). Cyrus of Edessa's Explanation for the Fasts, which dates to 538–543 A.D., mentions that "[fasting] appears with the Manichaeans, the Marcionites, Macedonians, Valentinians, and Katharoi (qtrw), together with all of the Mandaeans, the Kentaeans, and those like them." The Acts of Symeon bar Ṣabbāʿe warns readers to stay away from "the Manichaeans, the Marcionites, the Gangaeans (glyʾ < gngyʾ), the Purified [= Elchasaites], the Kentaeans (kntyʾ), the Mandaeans (mndyʾ), and the rest of the pagans (ḥanpe)."

Van Bladel (2017) argues that both the Mandaeans and Kentaeans likely originated during the mid or late 5th century in the Sasanian Empire. This date range is based on the fact that names for the Mandaeans and Kentaeans were directly attested in works by Cyrus of Edessa (fl. 500s) and in the Acts of Symeon bar Ṣabbā, but not in heresiologies by Aphrahat (c. 280–c. 345) and Ephrem the Syrian (c. 306–373) that had also mentioned many similar Gnostic groups.

== Common origin and schism with Mandaeans ==
Theodore bar Konai (c. 792 in the Book of the Scholion) considers the Mandaeans, whom he refers to as the Dostaeans, to be an offshoot of the Kentaeans. Van Bladel (2017) argues that the Kentaeans (Classical Syriac: ܟܢܬܝܐ, romanized: kntyʾ), who derived their teachings from Abel, and Mandaeans (Classical Syriac: ܡܢܕܝܐ, romanized: mndyʾ) are closely related to each other, and that they had become distinct from each other due to a historical schism.

In the Book of the Scholion, Theodore bar Konai quotes a passage nearly identical to Left Ginza 3.11 as part of the teachings of the Kentaeans (see Left Ginza § Theodore bar Konai).

== See also ==
- Elcesaites
- Borborites
- Euchites
- Ebionites
- Marcionism
- Bardaisan
- Archontics
- Quqites
