= Keywan Riahi =

Austrian energy scientist

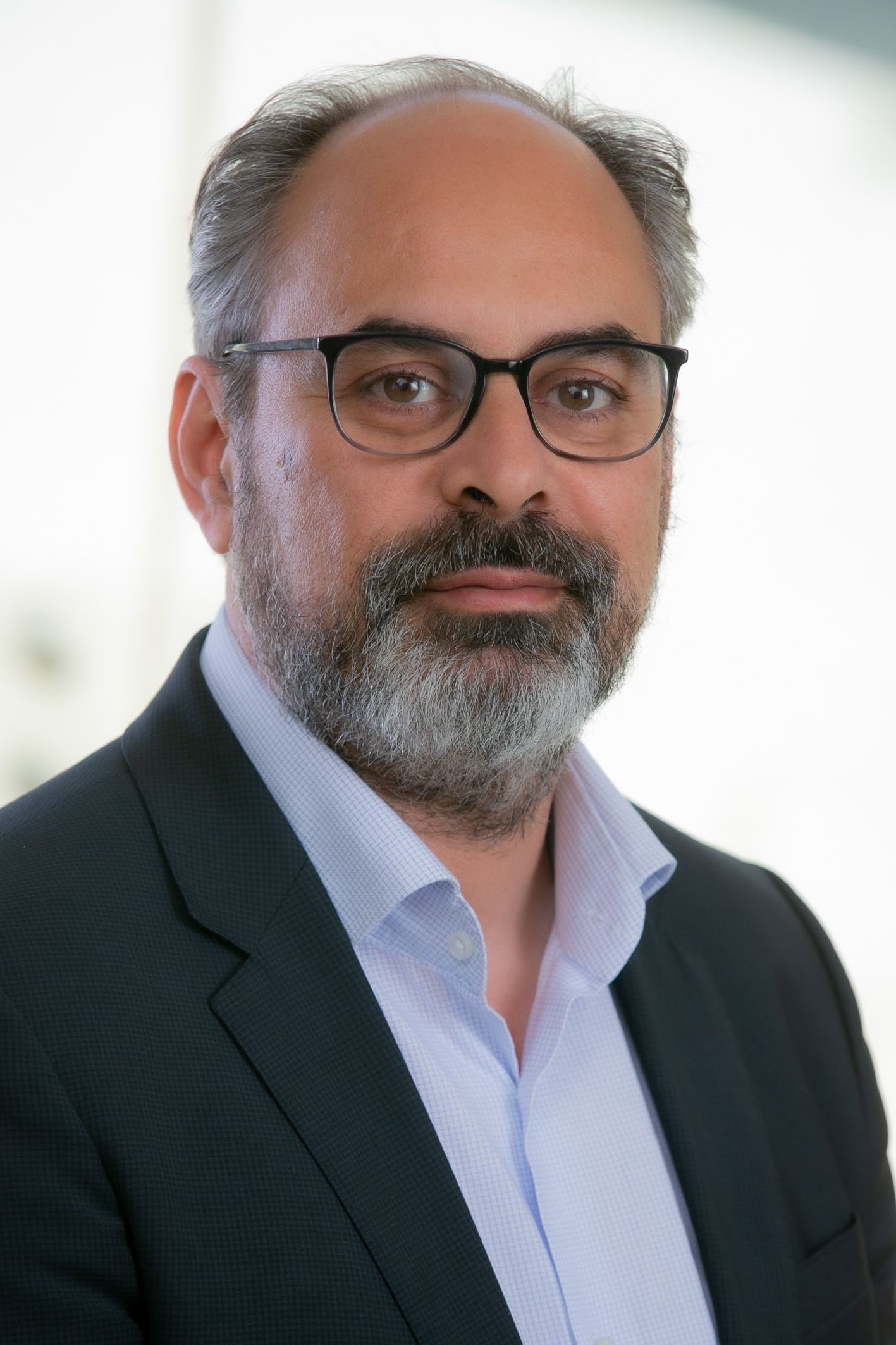
- Riahi in 2020
- Education: Graz University of Technology (PhD, Mechanical Engineering and Industrial Management)
- Occupations: Scientist, Director of Energy at IIASA, University professor, Policy advisor
- Employer: International Institute for Applied Systems Analysis (IIASA)
- Website: https://iiasa.ac.at/staff/keywan-riahi

Keywan Riahi is an Austrian scientist and Director of Energy at the International Institute for Applied Systems Analysis (IIASA). There, he contributes and advises on the United Nations (UN) 2030 climate agenda in the fields of science, technology, and innovation. He is also a Payne Faculty Fellow from the Colorado School of Mines and has held faculty positions at Graz University of Technology in Austria, University of Victoria in Canada, and University of Amsterdam in the Netherlands.

Riahi’s areas of expertise include economic development, sustainable development, energy, mathematics, engineering, and geosciences. He is listed by Reuters as the #1 most influential climate scientist and is among the most cited climate authors in the world.

== Education and career ==
Keywan Riahi attended Graz University of Technology in Styria, Austria from 1989 to 1997 and earned a doctorate degree in Mechanical Engineering and Industrial Management. He completed his doctoral thesis on the role of long-term technological changes in energy systems including carbon capture and sequestration. After graduation, Riahi obtained teaching positions at the Graz University of Technology, Austria in 2012, the University of Amsterdam and the University of Victoria, Canada, both in 2016, and a fellowship position at the Payne Institute of the Colorado School of Mines in 2018.

Riahi began working with the Intergovernmental Panel on Climate Change (IPCC) in the late 1990s and served as a lead author. He also began working at the International Institute for Applied Systems Analysis (IIASA) in 1997. In 2007, Riahi started his work as a member of the International Assessment Modeling Consortium (IAMC), a group of researchers organized to model and assess various climate scenarios. Starting in 2011, Riahi began working as a scientific committee member with Mitsubishi Electric Iconics Digital Solutions, formerly ICONICS, an automated software company working in fields such as renewable resources. In 2012, Clarivate recognized him as one of 23 researchers worldwide in their list of Highly Cited Researchers. In 2021, he became a member of the advisory board for the Schwarzenegger Climate Initiative, a climate awareness and advocacy group founded by Arnold Schwarzenegger to find solutions for climate issues. Beginning in 2022, Riahi became an advisor and senior expert for the Global Energy Interconnection Development and Cooperation Organization (GEIDCO), located in Beijing, an international non-profit focused on global renewable energy. Also in 2022, he became a co-chair of the Austrian Panel on Climate Change to work on their national climate reports.

== Work ==
=== Contribution to IPCC ===
Beginning in 1998, Riahi has worked with various international organizations, including the IPCC and the Global Energy Assessment (GEA), as a scientific author and peer reviewer. He contributed to IPCC reports three (2001), four (2007), five (2014), and six (2023). Riahi has also worked on IPCC special reports, including the reports on Emissions Scenarios, CO_{2} Capture, and Renewable Energy. One of Riahi's most significant contributions, coming in his work on the fifth report, has been in the field of climate modeling. His research and contributions in the fifth report led to the development of Representative Concentration Pathways (RCPs) and Shared Socioeconomic Pathways (SSPs). The RCP database documents emissions, concentrations, and land-cover change projections based on different radiative forcing levels. These documents can be compared with SSPs to analyze the relationship between climate change and socioeconomic factors. SSPs are based on five narratives describing alternative socioeconomic development, including sustainable development, regional rivalry, inequality, fossil-fueled development, and middle-of-the-road development. This new framework led to the facilitation of an integrated analysis of future climate change impacts and how it relates to policy assumptions and socioeconomic narratives. The project was an innovative way to quantify energy development and uncertainties for greenhouse gases and air pollution. In the sixth report, his primary focus was on mitigation pathways compatible with the long-term goals in Working Group III.

=== Research projects ===
Riahi has also worked on CD-LINKS, an effort to promote the international sharing of research and knowledge aimed at sustainable development and policy, as well as ENGAGE, an effort to reduce global emissions of greenhouse gases in accordance with the Paris Climate Agreement. The CD-Links project was a four-year project, spanning from September 2015 - September 2019, that brought together collaborators from around the world. The project aimed to understand the connections between climate change policy and sustainable development objectives, develop globally consistent, low-carbon development pathways, and broaden the evidence of policy effectiveness. Riahi's contributions led to new policy designs that account for mitigation trade-offs and proposed a new framework for improving multiple-objective policymaking.

The "Exploring National and Global Actions to Reduce Greenhouse Gas Emissions" (ENGAGE) project was developed in 2019 by Riahi and a team of scientists to create a framework for designing cost-effective, socially and politically feasible forms of technology. The European Union project, coordinated by the International Institute for Applied Systems Analysis (IIASA), is formed by 30 institutions with an aim to obtain negative carbon emissions in correlation with the UN sustainable development goals.

Riahi's work on the “GENIE” project began in 2021. This project focuses on geo-engineering and negative emission pathways throughout Europe to aid in carbon dioxide emission removal. Riahi serves as a principal investigator and leads the contribution of the International Institute for Applied Systems Analysis on the project. The focus of this project is to assess the direct and indirect components of land-based carbon fluxes to find mitigation techniques. IPCC assessed pathways provide land-use change data that can be analyzed in the GENIE Scenario Explorer as part of Riahi’s research on Direct-Air-Capture with Carbon Storage.

Riahi co-authored a commentary in Nature titled "Exceeding 1.5°C requires rethinking accountability in climate policy." With global warming reaching record highs, the authors argue that failing to act against human interference would lead to harmful consequences. That is why the authors pushed for the IPCC’s 7th Assessment Report to anchor the 1.5°C target.

=== Policy advisory roles ===
In 2021, Riahi was appointed to the United Nations (UN) advising group on science, technology, and innovation regarding the UN’s 2030 sustainable development goals. He has served as a panelist to form the sustainable development goals for the UN under the Department of Economic and Social Affairs since 2021. This panel focuses on integrated technology solutions to the energy, food, water, and climate crises. The panel primarily focused on sustainable development goals six, seven, and nine.

In 2022, Riahi was appointed to the European Scientific Advisory Board on Climate Change through the European Union and is a member of the Scientific Advisory Board of Vienna, Austria. United Nations Secretary-General António Guterres appointed Riahi to support the UN Technology and Facilitation Mechanism. The 10-member group works closely with stakeholders to accelerate progress on sustainable development through technology and innovation. Riahi became one of the first to conduct an integrated analysis of the UN agenda in order to meet standard development goals seven and thirteen.

== Awards ==
In 2015, Riahi received the IAMC award for his contributions to integrated assessment modelling. Keywan Riahi has also received 18 “Highly Cited Researcher” awards across the fields of Social Science, Environment and Ecology, and Geosciences since 2016. He also received a highly important European Research Council (ERC) Synergy grant for his work on the GENIE project. This grant enables researchers to collaborate in order to make substantial technological advancements. Additionally, he was listed by Reuters as the most influential climate scientist based on papers published, number of times cited, and public reach of work.

=== Notable publications ===
Riahi has authored more than 190 peer-reviewed articles, has contributed to over 300 publications, and has been cited nearly 84,000 times in the span of his career. Some of his most notable publications include:

- Climate Change 2014: Synthesis Report. Contribution of Working Groups I, II and III to the Fifth Assessment Report of the Intergovernmental Panel on Climate Change AR5 Synthesis Report: Climate Change 2014
- Special Report on Emissions Scenarios (2000)
- The Shared Socioeconomic Pathways and their Energy, Land Use, and Greenhouse Gas Emissions Implications: An Overview
- Technological Learning for Carbon Capture and Sequestration Technologies (2004)
- Scenarios of long-term socio-economic and environmental development under climate stabilization
- Entry points for assessing 'fair shares' in national mitigation contributions

== Significance and outlook ==
Riahi's work seeks to demonstrate the importance of climate change by recognizing its various effects and finding implementable solutions. He has made significant contributions to the scientific and technological sides of climate research through his work on RCPs, IPCC reports, ENGAGE, and the GENIE project. These projects have broken new ground not only in climate knowledge, but also through detailed modeling of its effects on different resources and regions. Additionally, his work has been influential in the areas of carbon capture and affordable technology solutions.

Besides just a focus on technology solutions, Riahi has also placed an emphasis on greater socioeconomic and policy solutions. His work on SSPs, inequality in development, research sharing among nations, and CD-LINKS has revolutionized interpretations connecting climate change and its effect with socioeconomic conditions, as well as provided new development and policy-making avenues seeking to tackle both issues simultaneously. Riahi has combined his technological and policy focuses through his roles at the UN. There, he has had a major impact in using technological solutions to address policy-making for the UN's sustainable development goals.

Riahi's outlook on the future believes that failing to act regarding climate change will have greater economic consequences than emission avoidance costs. He also believes that not all countries will have an equal burden in divesting from fossil fuels, hence his work on research sharing and inequality. Riahi's outlook requires a world that is committed to zero emissions, a sharing economy, renewable energy, and an electrification of demand systems. He foresees the development of utilities as resilience managers, ensuring there aren't stoppages in available electricity, as well as increased digitization to ensure a better connection of systems. Riahi also envisions a greater electrification of transportation services, as well as less car use, in ways that are beneficial to users and incentivize their use. Ultimately, he views the future as a joint effort that utilizes both technological and policy means to avoid the worst outcomes of climate change.
