= Moloch (disambiguation) =

Moloch is the name of a god associated with child sacrifice in the Hebrew Bible and with Phoenician religion.

Moloch may also refer to:

- Moloch (1999 film), a biographical film by Alexander Sokurov about Adolf Hitler
- Moloch (2022 film), a Dutch folk horror film
- Moloch (Dungeons & Dragons), an archdevil in the Dungeons & Dragons role-playing game
- Moloch: Book of Angels Volume 6, a 2006 album by pianist Uri Caine composed by John Zorn
- Moloch: or, This Gentile World, the first novel written by Henry Miller, unpublished until 1992
- Moloch (Kuprin novel), an 1896 novel by Alexander Kuprin
- Moloch (Mortal Kombat), a character in the Mortal Kombat video game series
- Moloch (Buffyverse), a demon in the TV show Buffy the Vampire Slayer
- Moloc (Stargate), a Goa'uld from Stargate SG-1
- Moloch horridus, also known as the Australian thorny devil, the sole lizard species of the genus Moloch
- Hylobates moloch, commonly known as the Silvery gibbon, a primate that lives exclusively in Java, Indonesia

== See also ==
- Mleccha
- Moloch in popular culture
- Sakkuth (disambiguation)
