= Molok (company) =

Finnish manufacturing company

Molok Oy
- Type: Osakeyhtiö
- Founded: 1991; 35 years ago
- Founder: Veikko Salli
- Headquarters: Nokia, Finland
- Key people: Marko Penttinen, CEO
- Products: Molok deep waste collection containers
- Revenue: 23.1 million euros (2021)
- Number of employees: 84 (2021)
- Subsidiaries: Molok France, Molok España
- Website: molok.com

Molok Oy is a Finnish company that manufactures and markets deep waste collection containers. In the deep collection system developed by Molok, more than half of the waste containers are underground. Molok is also a registered trademark.

== History ==
=== 1991–2009 ===
Veikko Salli founded Molok Oy in 1991. In the 1980s he had worked in the hotel business. Looking at the ugly trash bins in the backyard of his hotel, Salli was thinking aloud what he should do with them. Salli's wife got finally nervous about his reflections and told him to dig them into the ground and that's how the Molok's product idea was initiated. The first prototype Salli designed was made from metal.

In 1993, Molok Oy focused on product development and marketing. There were more than ten Finnish subcontractors participating in the manufacture of its products. The company had a sales network of independent representatives in Finland, Sweden, Norway, Germany, Switzerland, Hungary, Portugal, Australia and the United States. It delivered hundreds of deep collection containers for example to in the Lake Balaton region in Hungary worth several million Finnish markkas.

In 1994, the company's turnover was 12 million markkas, of which exports part was 37%.

In 1995, the company had customers in Belgium, Germany, Switzerland, Austria and the Nordic countries, among others, and it was starting sales in Spain. Molok began manufacturing large parts for Southern European orders in Saint-Malo, France while Molok containers for the Finnish and Central European markets were still made in Finland. During the winter Molok was for example installing several dozen Molok containers in the park areas of Paris and the marina in the Portuguese Algarve. In Finland, Molok products were used for example in the municipalities of Inari, Lavia and Loppi. By the end of 1995, more than 4,000 Molok deep collection containers had been sold.

In 1997, the company's turnover was 20 million markkas and the share of exports was 70%. Its largest market areas were Belgium, Portugal and Spain.

In 1998, Molok introduced a multi-compartment container suitable for sorting many waste fractions. The 1,200-liter container had three or four compartments and was also equipped with a separate biodegrable waste lifting container if needed. There was a separate lifting bag in each compartment and when the container was full, the collection company was notified by telephone. The pilot products were sold to Oulu. In 2001, Molok Oy's turnover was 6 million euros, about one third more than the year before that.

In 2002, Molok manufactured containers for the collection of general waste, paper, glass, small metals and biowaste, as well as for park usage. It employed 22 people in Nokia and Lavia. One of the most significant deals of the year came from Dubai for more than 100 containers worth 300,000 euros.

In 2004, Molok lost the patent protection it had received for its deep collection system in 1988. Molok centralized all its Finnish operations to Nokia and started casting of the container bodies by itself. A 5,000-square-meter hall was built in Nokia for the assembly and product development of deep collection system. The company's management, marketing and finance departments were also located at the same place.

By 2005, Molok had produced over 40,000 deep collection containers. The company employed 35 people and its main market areas were Finland, Sweden, Spain, Brazil, Canada and the United Arab Emirates. The following year the amount of sold containers reached 50,000.

In 2007, the company's production and office facilities were located in Nokia. It also had assembly plants in Canada, Portugal, Belgium and Switzerland.

In 2008, Molok delivered deep collection containers for the Summer Olympics in Beijing.

In 2009, Molok won a long product copy dispute. The company's former representative in France had marketed product copies under the Molok's name and was now sentenced to pay substantial compensation. The Hamburg arbitration court recognized Molok Oy's position as the original developer of the deep collection method and as the official holder of the Molok® brand name. In May 2009, the company participated in the Playful New Finnish Design event during New York Design Week together with Artek, Durat, Marimekko and IVANA Helsinki.

=== 2010–present ===
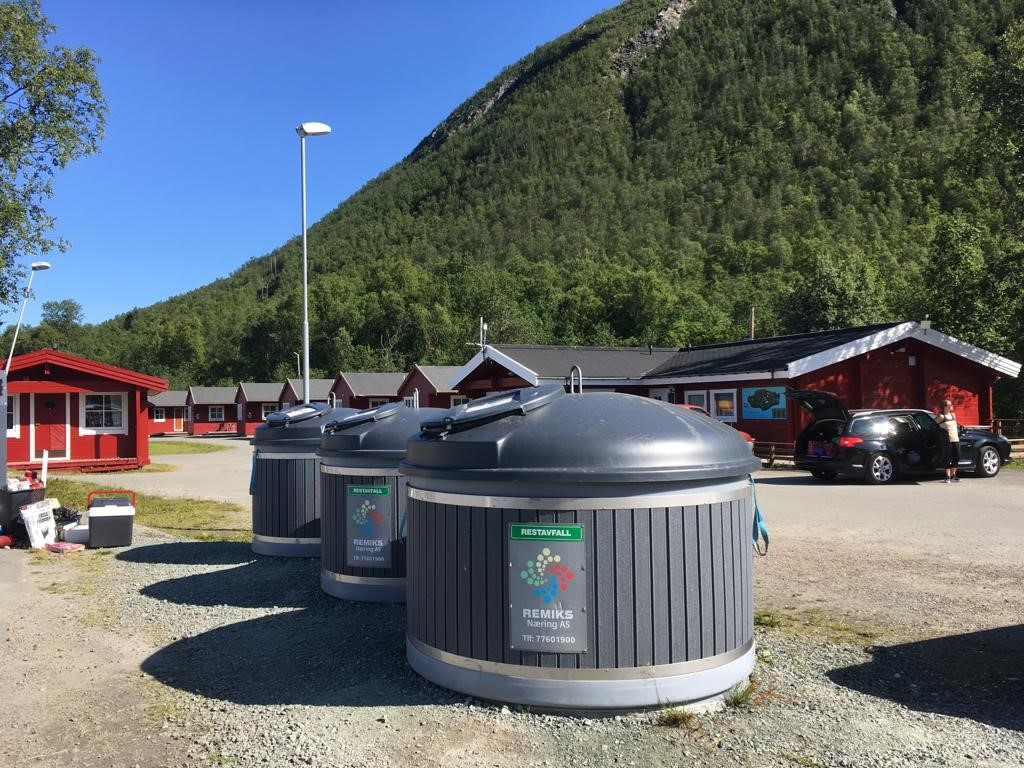
MolokClassic containers in Tromsø Camping area, Norway in 2019

Hannu Jokinen was appointed as CEO in 2012.

In 2014, Molok acquired Lassila & Tikanoja's deep collection business. It had sold Deepline and Cube deep container product families since 2008.

In 2015, Molok started cooperating with Lujabetoni who produces the reinforced fiber concrete wells to Molok's waste containers. By 2016, the company had delivered about 150,000 waste bins. The company's founder, Veikko Salli, was 80 years old and continued to serve as a member of the Board and as an advisor to the company. His daughter Marja Hillis ran a licensed company manufacturing Molok products in Canada, and his son Jari Salli was one of the owners of the company. The family business needed a new owner and more resources for its international growth. Therefore, 84% of Molok Oy was sold to Vaaka Partners. Simultaneously the company was divided into two parts. The company's industrial premises and warehousing operations were left to the old company, now called Salli Kiinteistöt. Jari Salli started as the Managing Director of Salli Kiinteistöt Oy.

In 2017 Molok turnover was nearly 20 million euros.

In 2019 Molok got its first subsidiary, Molok France. In 2020, Molok España was opened. In August 2020 Marko Penttinen started as a CEO.

== Organization ==
In addition to its Nokia office and production, Molok Oy operates internationally in more than 40 countries, including sales offices in Belgium and China. It has two subsidiaries, Molok France and Molok España.

Molok Oy has a working culture of a family company and it has divided its production into cells. The cells work independently, which increases employee motivation. Staff benefits include for example trainings and free massages.

=== Molok North America ===
Marja Hillis, nee Salli, the daughter of Molok's founder Veikko Salli, started a licensed company called Molok North America manufacturing Molok products in Canada in the end of the 1990s. The company and its assembly plant are located in Mount Forest, Ontario.

In 2003, Molok started its own collection business in the Kitchener-Waterloo area in Canada.

In 2018 the company operated across Canada and its factory covered 3,000 square meters. Hillis died on March.

In 2019 Raleigh, North Carolina started using Molok's containers being the first city in United States to do so.

In 2020, Molok North America was among the top-400 list of Canada's Top Growing Companies ranked by The Globe and Mail magazine. It has also been on PROFIT 500 list, maintained by Canadian Business magazine ranking Canada's Fastest-Growing Companies in 2013, 2014 and 2015.

== Products ==
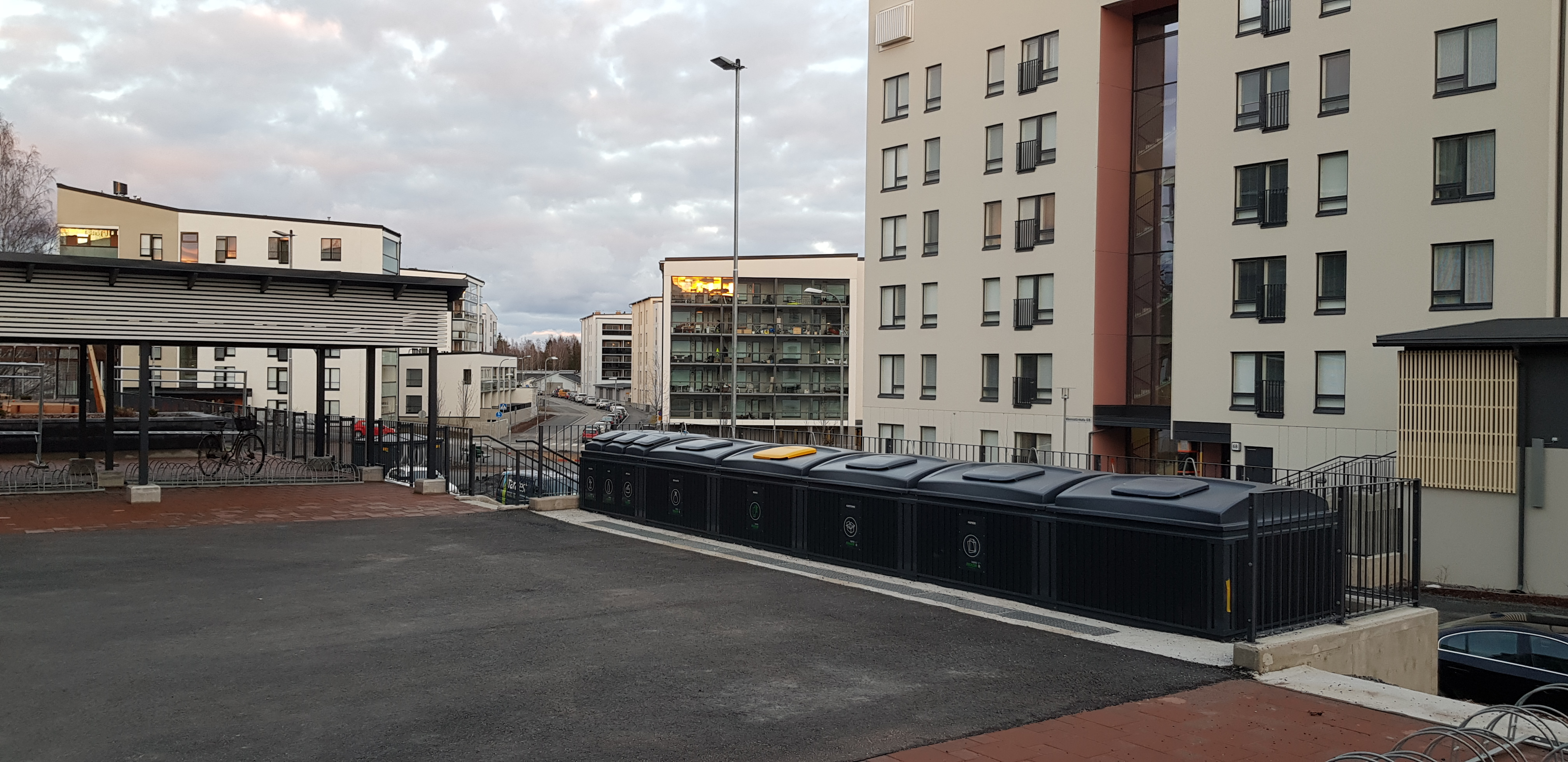
MolokDomino square containers in Lentävänniemi, Tampere in 2020

The Molok deep collection system was developed by the company's founder Veikko Salli. Molok manufactures its deep collection containers based on orders. There are many different designs, as properties have different needs, for example containers need to match their environment as well as possible. 80% of sales come from the four basic models. The main part of the containers is made by a rotational molding machine.

In 2006 the uniform containers were made of thick polyethylene plastic while the top was covered with either pressure-treated wood moldings or aluminum. The company's also sells containers consisting of square containers made of concrete.

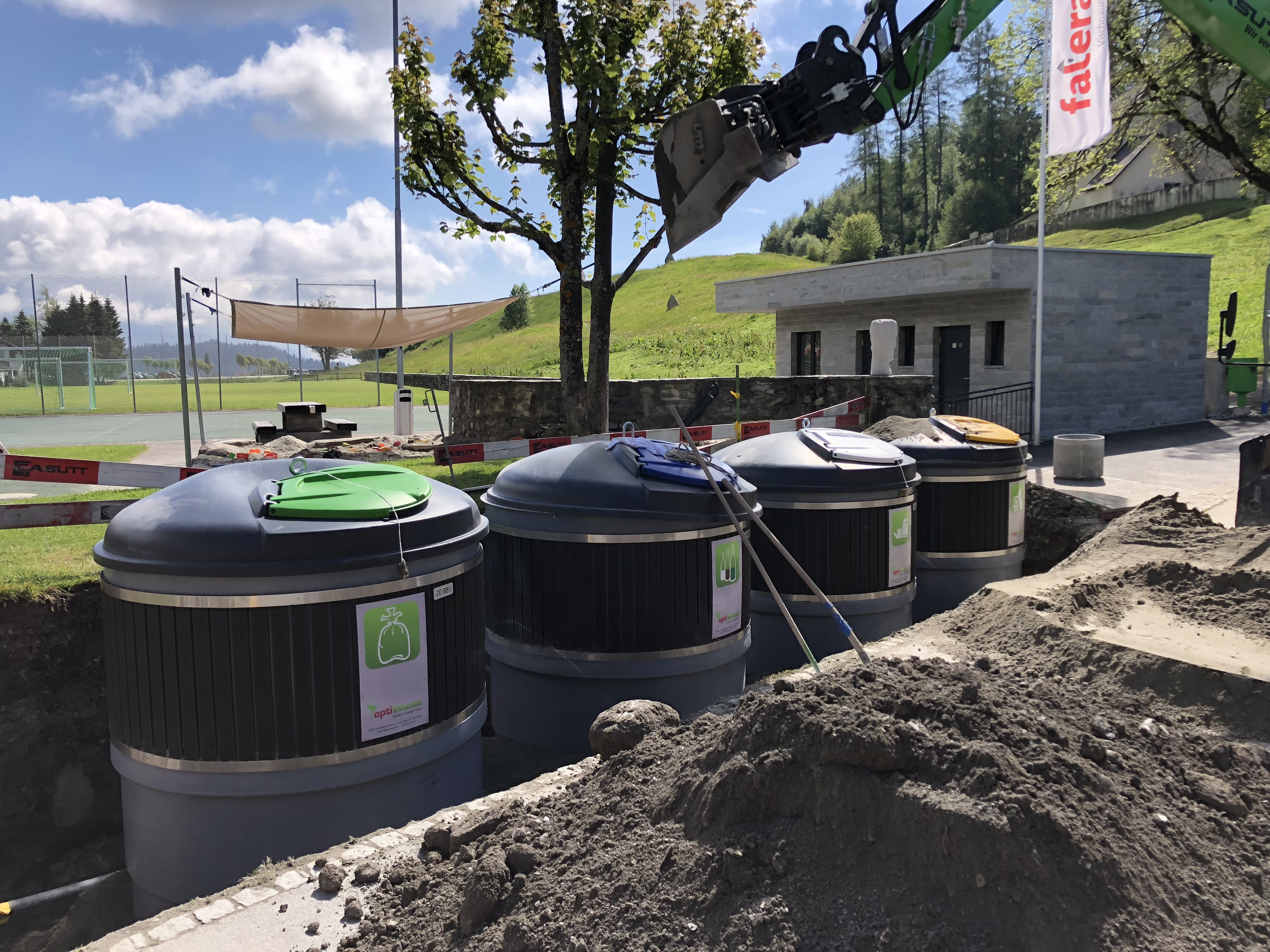
Installation of Molok containers in Switzerland

The basic idea of deep waste collection is a partially submerged waste container with volumes ranging from 800 liters to 5,000 liters. Inside the cool ground, protected from sunlight, the waste is retained longer than normally and it is also packed tightly. This is because the vertical collection container utilizes gravity, which allows the new waste to compress the waste below into a more compact form. With help of the gravity the collection container can hold more waste.

The advantages of deep collection system are high collection capacity, long emptying intervals, odorlessness and keeping the collection environment clean. Another advantage of Molok products is that it takes up less space above the ground than the traditional rubbish bins, which leaves room for other needs of the residents. Also the amount of waste traffic is decreased as the containers do not need emptying as often than with traditional systems. Odorlessness of the waste is achieved through the heat of the soil: in the North, cool soil cools the debris. In the Middle East the temperature of containers can rise to as high as 60 degrees Celsius, which dries out the waste.

When installing a Molok deep collection system, a pit is dug in the ground to install a waste container. 60% of the Molok container is submerged below the ground level. The container contains a lifting bag or container that is lifted out of the container for emptying using the emptying truck's crane. When emptying, the lifting bag or lifting container opens at its lower end.

== Acknowledgements ==
- In 1995, Molok became the first foreign waste collection system to pass the German environmental test and to obtain the right to use the eco-label (Umweltzeichen). For example, the low noise level of the use of Molok was mentioned.
- In 2007, Molok received the Pirkanmaa Provincial Entrepreneurship Award
- In 2017, Molok received The Clean Tech Economy Award from The New Economy Magazine
