= Isaac Karo =

- Born: 1458; Toledo, Spain
- Died: 1535 (aged 76–77) probably Jerusalem

Isaac Karo (1458-1535) was a famous posek, preacher, Rosh Yeshiva, and physician. He was born in Toledo, Spain and probably died in Jerusalem. He was the uncle and teacher of Rabbi Joseph Karo, author of the Shulchan Aruch.

== Biography ==
Rabbi Karo studied under Rabbi Isaac Canpanton in Toledo. Eventually, he moved to Lisbon in order to establish his own Yeshiva.

As a Spanish Jew, he was forcibly exiled from his homeland Spain after the signing of the Alhambra Decree in 1492 which expelled all Jews from the joint kingdom of Isabella I of Castile and Ferdinand II of Aragon. From Spain he immigrated to nearby Portugal, only to be expelled with the Jews of Portugal. While en route to Turkey all but one of his sons died. Although the details of Rabbi Karo's life afterwards are unclear, it is apparent that he lived Istanbul in Turkey.

In the year 1517, he completed his magnum opus, Toldot Yitzchak. In that year, he set out to Israel, but it is unclear whether he eventually reached Israel or did not. Some scholars write that he moved at this time to Damascus.

== Works ==
- Toldot Yitzchok (a commentary on the Chumash) published in 1517
- Chasdei David (compiled by Rabbi Karo's students) includes various homilies expounded upon by Rabbi Karo in the realm of philosophy and aggadah.
- Several Responsa#In Judaism written by Rabbi Yitzchok Karo were published as an addendum to the responsa of his nephew, Rabbi Joseph Karo in responsa Beit Yosef.
