= Iconics =

Mitsubishi Electric Iconics Digital Solutions, Inc.
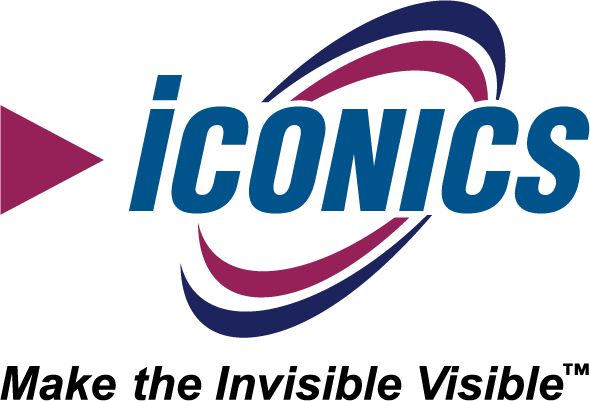
- Formerly: ICONICS
- Type: Private
- Industry: Automation Software
- Founded: 1986
- Headquarters: Foxborough, Massachusetts, United States
- Area served: Worldwide
- Parent: Mitsubishi Electric

Mitsubishi Electric Iconics Digital Solutions, Inc. (Formerly ICONICS, Inc.) is an automation software provider and a wholly owned subsidiary of Mitsubishi Electric. The company's software portfolio includes GENESIS, an automation software platform used across industrial, infrastructure, and building applications, and IBSS, a software stack for workplace management. The company's software is used across industries including automotive and tire, data centers, energy and utilities, food and beverage, government and defense, life sciences, manufacturing, materials and mining, oil, gas and chemicals, smart buildings, transportation and infrastructure, and water and wastewater.

== History ==
Founded in 1986 as ICONICS and headquartered in Foxborough, Massachusetts, Mitsubishi Electric Iconics Digital Solutions has offices in the United States, United Kingdom, Czech Republic, Germany, and Italy, and serves customers globally.

In 2011, ICONICS signed a global partnership agreement with Mitsubishi Electric to develop integrated software for the Process Automation and Social Infrastructure global markets, with Mitsubishi Electric contributing a 19.9% equity investment in the company. In March 2019, Mitsubishi Electric took full ownership.

In 2021, Edward (“Ted”) Hill was appointed president and CEO of the company. Hill replaced Yuji Ichioka, who served as interim president and CEO following the November 2020 retirement of the company's founder, Russ Agrusa.

In 2025, ICONICS was officially renamed to Mitsubishi Electric Iconics Digital Solutions, Inc. effective April 1, 2025.

== Software ==
GENESIS is the company's automation software platform, providing capabilities for supervisory control and data acquisition (SCADA), human-machine interface (HMI), data connectivity, visualization, alarming, data historization, analytics, and reporting. GENESIS supports applications across industrial automation, manufacturing, building automation, data centers, utilities, transportation, and infrastructure.

Intelligent Buildings Software Stack (IBSS) is the company's workplace management software stack. IBSS supports applications including room and desk booking, visitor management, wayfinding, occupancy analytics, and workplace planning.

== Notable applications ==
GENESIS is used by companies throughout the world including:

- Transneft Russian Pipeline
- Heathrow Terminal 5
- Loudoun Water
- The Pentagon
- University of Virginia
- Microsoft campus

Other organizations using the company's software for automation applications include the Rome Metro, Deutsche Bahn, Mohegan Sun Casino, Federation Tower, Schiphol Airport, Phoenix Sky Harbor International Airport and Poste Italiane.
