= Sakkuth =

Australian musical group

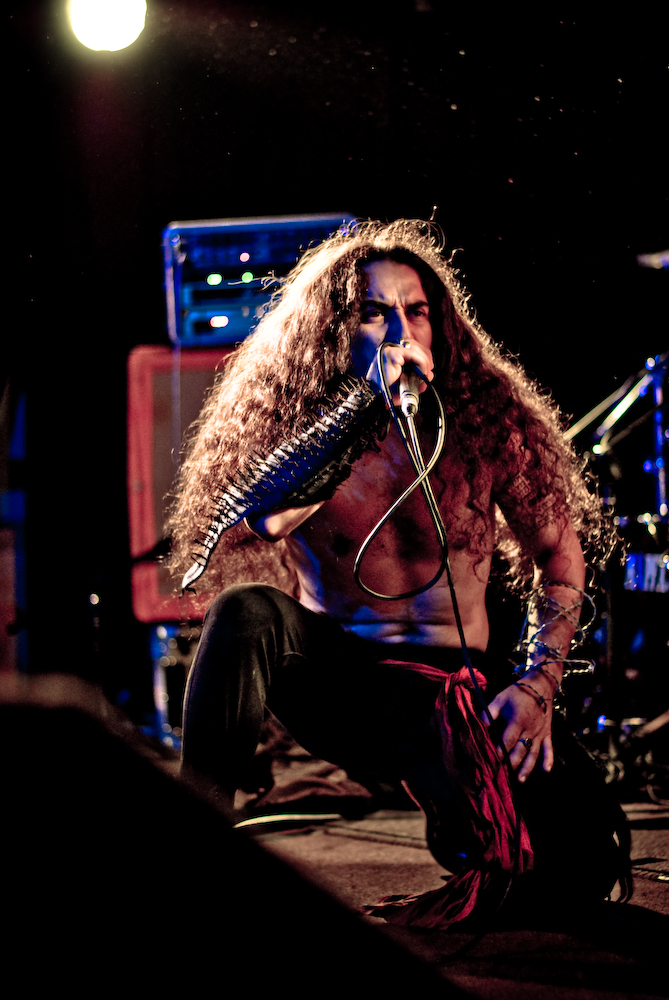
- Moises Contreras at the Sands Tavern, 13 February 2009

Background information
- Origin: Brisbane, Queensland, Australia
- Genre: Melodic metal
- Years active: 1998–present
- Members: Moises Contrearas; Scott McIvor; Nathan Bruen; Vaughan Piffero; Damien Biggers
- Past members: Lindal Loakes; Adam Merker
- Website: http://www.sakkuth.com

Sakkuth is an Australian melodic metal band formed in Brisbane, Queensland in 1998. They describe themselves as "melodic metal". The band was active in the Brisbane heavy metal scene and around Australia for nearly 10 years.

== Members ==
=== The beginning ===
Sakkuth was created by Adam Merker (guitars '94-'05) and Moises Contreras (vocals '94-present). Craig Hollywood was hired as second guitar, Wolfgang on Keyboard, Scott Ward on Drums and various Bass players tried to fill the slot while the band found its feet. After performing with this line-up the decision was made to look into other line up options. A number of line-up changes later, Scott McIvor was hired for lead guitar, Damien Biggers was poached from a local band after impressing Adam with his drumming on his previous band's demo. Lindal Loakes joined the band almost by accident and the lineup became complete. The first EP was recorded at "Soul Studios" on the Gold Coast in Queensland by Adam Keane (guitarist and producer of SoundSurgery). This independent release was well received by both fans and radio with the first song from the EP "Time and Sweet Nectar" receiving continual air time on "JJJ's" three hours of power and the evergrowing crowds at live shows. This track was also included on a JJJ metal compilation receiving national distribution.

After writing the songs for the first full-length "Quest from within" Sakkuth guitarist Adam Merker started Studio Anders Debeerz for the specific purpose of recording the band's music.

=== Previous Members ===
Lindal Loakes left the band prior to writing "Quest from Within" citing creative differences as the reason.

In Late 2005 Guitarist and co-founder, Adam Merker, left the band to spend more time with his family and to concentrate on his career as a producer/engineer (Studio Anders Debeerz).

== Discography ==
From Wretched Blood

1. Murderous Intent
2. Restless
3. Suffering Dead
4. Devour Me
5. Rebirth
6. Addict
7. The Walking
8. Tomorrow We Die
9. As I Went Below
10. Torment of the Body and Soul

Don't Fight the Urge (re-issue) [2005] Don't Fight the Urge [2002]

1. Reborn into Dreams
2. On My Shoulders – A video clip was made for the song "On My Shoulders"
3. Sleepwalker
4. Banshee Scream
5. Not For Me
6. Second Skin
7. As the Seas Turn Red
8. Don't Fight The Urge

Bonus Tracks

1. Time and Sweet Nectar
2. Burn
3. Quest from Within
4. Innocence is a Sin

Quest From Within Self-released [2000] Review

1. Last Words
2. Needle
3. Embraced
4. Quest from Within
5. Shut your Eyes
6. Burn
7. Moriquendi
8. By your hand
9. Lantern
10. Happiness so Forgotten

Sakkuth [EP] Self-released [1998]

1. Time and Sweet Nectar
2. Shattered Society
3. Stalking a Masterpiece
4. Ecstasy Haunting
5. The Calling of Time
6. Innocence is a Sin

=== Compilation albums ===
Their track Time and Sweet Nectar was included on the first edition of the compilation Full Metal Racket volume 1 released by Australia's music radio network Triple J in association with their heavy metal music program Full Metal Racket.

== See also ==
- Moriquendi (Middle-earth)
