= Amos 3 =

- ← chapter 2 chapter 4 →
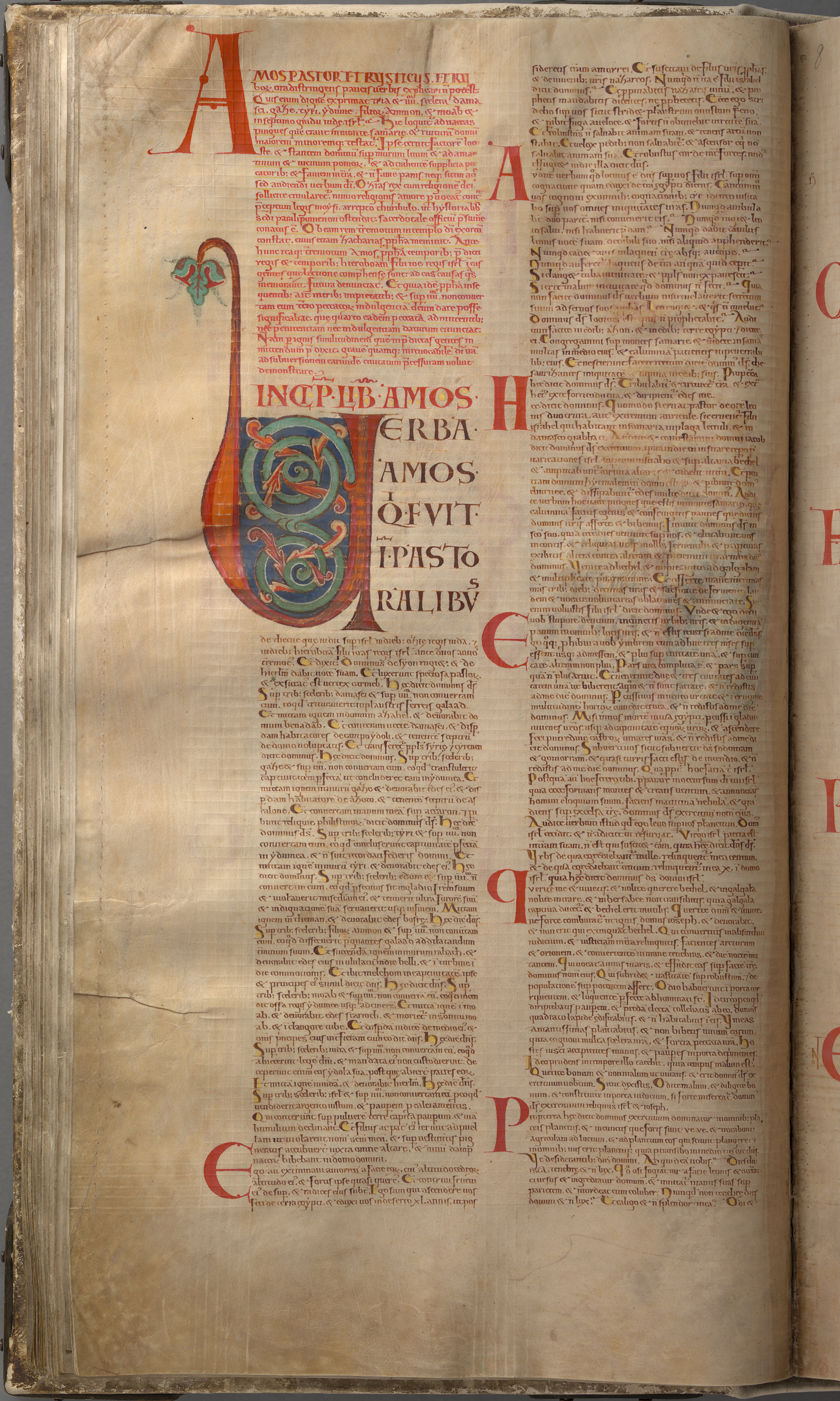
- Book of Amos (1:1–5:21) in Latin in Codex Gigas, made around 13th century.
- Book: Book of Amos
- Category: Nevi'im
- Christian Bible part: Old Testament
- Order in the Christian part: 30

Amos 3 is the third chapter of the Book of Amos in the Hebrew Bible or the Old Testament of the Christian Bible. This book contains the prophecies attributed to the prophet Amos, especially God's extraordinary love, being repaid by Israel with ingratitude, of necessity calls for judgments. In the Hebrew Bible it is a part of the Book of the Twelve Minor Prophets.

In this chapter, following oracles against Israel and Judah and the countries surrounding them in chapters 1 and 2, Amos addresses "Judah and Israel together - the whole family (Amos 3:1) whom [God] had brought up from Egypt". Jennifer Dines treats Amos 3:1-5:17 as a single literary unit, whereas John Nelson Darby treats each chapter, except for chapters 1 and 2, as "a distinct prophecy".

== Text ==
The original text was written in Hebrew. This chapter is divided into 15 verses. Some early manuscripts containing the text of this chapter in Hebrew are of the Masoretic Text tradition, which includes the Codex Cairensis (895), the Petersburg Codex of the Prophets (916), Aleppo Codex (10th century), Codex Leningradensis (1008). Fragments cumulatively containing all verses of this chapter in Hebrew were found among the Dead Sea Scrolls including 4Q78 (4QXII^{c}; 75–50 BCE) with extant verses 1–15; and 4Q82 (4QXII^{g}; 25 BCE) with extant verses 1–2.

There is also a translation into Koine Greek known as the Septuagint, made in the last few centuries BCE. Extant ancient manuscripts of the Septuagint version include Codex Vaticanus (B; $\mathfrak{G}$^{B}; 4th century), Codex Alexandrinus (A; $\mathfrak{G}$^{A}; 5th century) and Codex Marchalianus (Q; $\mathfrak{G}$^{Q}; 6th century). (Note: The extant Codex Sinaiticus currently does not have the whole Book of Amos.)

== Verse 1 ==
Hear this word that the Lord hath spoken against you, O children of Israel,

against the whole family which I brought up from the land of Egypt, saying,

- "Hear this word": Use three times in the whole book (Amos 3:1, 4:1; 5:1).
- "Children of Israel": not just the ten tribes, but "the whole family brought up from Egypt"; all the descendants of Jacob, including Judah and Benjamin (cf. Jeremiah 8:3; Micah 2:3, on "family" for the nation), but the prophecy refers mainly to the ten tribes, as the majority of the nation.

== Verse 2 ==
You only have I known of all the families of the earth:

therefore I will punish you for all your iniquities.

- "Known": i.e. "known favorably, noticed, regarded": so Genesis 18:19, "I have known him to the end that he may command his children and his household after him that they may keep the way of Jehovah," etc.; Hosea 13:5, "I did know thee in the wilderness, in the land of great drought"; Psalm 1:6; Psalm 37:18, and elsewhere. Israel was the only nation whom Jehovah 'knew' in this special sense, and visited with the tokens of His friendship.
- "Therefore I will punish you for all your iniquities" or "visit upon you"; or "against you"; in a way of chastisement and correction; the Lord was determined to make an example of them (cf. 1 Peter 4:17).

== Verse 3 ==
Can two walk together, unless they are agreed?

The New International Version translates this verse as "Do two walk together unless they have agreed to do so?" Darby relates this comment to Israel and God, and by extension to the individual, "our walk", with God. Alexander Maclaren notes that two friends can journey together without having to agree on everything. "They must, however, wish to keep each other's company, and they must be going by the same road to the same place."

== Verse 12 ==
Thus says the LORD: As the shepherd rescues from the mouth of the lion two legs, or a piece of an ear, so shall the people of Israel who live in Samaria be rescued, with the corner of a couch and part of a bed.

This verse is treated as Amos' first reference to the idea of a "remnant", to which he refers again in Amos 5:15 and more completely in Amos 9:8:

I will destroy it from the face of the earth - except that I will not utterly destroy the house of Jacob.

== See also ==
- Ashdod
- Bethel
- Damascus
- Egypt
- Israel
- Jacob
- Samaria
- Related Bible parts: Amos 2, 1 Peter 4

== Sources ==
- Collins, John J. (2014). Introduction to the Hebrew Scriptures. Fortress Press. ISBN 9781451469233.
- Fitzmyer, Joseph A. (2008). A Guide to the Dead Sea Scrolls and Related Literature. Grand Rapids, MI: William B. Eerdmans Publishing Company. ISBN 9780802862419.
- Hayes, Christine (2015). Introduction to the Bible. Yale University Press. ISBN 978-0300188271.
- Ulrich, Eugene, ed. (2010). The Biblical Qumran Scrolls: Transcriptions and Textual Variants. Brill.
- Würthwein, Ernst (1995). The Text of the Old Testament. Translated by Rhodes, Erroll F. Grand Rapids, MI: Wm. B. Eerdmans. ISBN 0-8028-0788-7.
