= Remphan =

Assyrian-Babylonian god for the planet Saturn

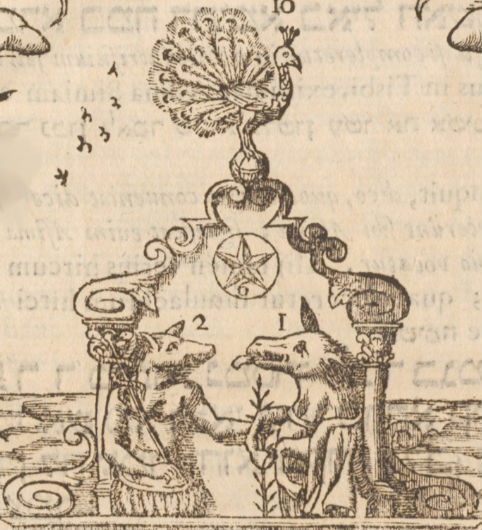
The Star of Remphan in a pantheon of Samaritan idols, from Athanasius Kircher's Oedipus Aegyptiacus (1652)

Remphan (also spelled Rephan; Koine Greek: Ῥαιφάν) is a term used by Stephen at the time of his martyrdom in the Book of Acts 7:43 in the New Testament, in reference to a specific object of idolatrous worship:

Yea, ye took up the tabernacle of Moloch, and the star of your god Remphan, figures which ye made to worship them: and I will carry you away beyond Babylon. (Acts 7:43)

According to some Biblical scholars, the name refers to the Hebrew Kiyyun or Chiun (Hebrew: כִּיּוּן), mentioned in Amos 5:26. Since the words "Kiyyun" ("Chiun") and "Remphan" are each hapax legomena, there is debate whether they are meant as common or proper nouns. It is generally presumed that both remphan and chiun refer to the planet Saturn.

== In the Bible ==
In the Acts of the Apostles, the deacon Stephen condemns Jewish idolatry in the following verse: "Ye took up the tabernacle of Moloch, and the star of your god Remphan, figures which ye made to worship them: and I will carry you away beyond Babylon." In the Greek of the New Testament, it is a mostly word-for-word quotation of the 3rd century BC Septuagint translation of Amos 5:26–27: "Ye have borne the tabernacle of your Moloch and Chiun your images, the star of your god, which ye made to yourselves. (27) Therefore will I cause you to go into captivity beyond Damascus, saith the Lᴏʀᴅ, whose name is The God of Hosts."

The context for the admonition is that Amos had been sent to the northern Kingdom of Samaria, where Judaism had become syncretic with foreign idolatry, which he declares unacceptable. It is seen as a prophetic reference to Shalmaneser V's later capture of the Israelites and taking them into the cities of the Medes.

== Etymology ==
Remphan (Note: Also transliterated as Romphan, Rempham, Rephan, or Raiphan.) is a rendering of the Ancient Greek, ρεμφαν. Various manuscripts offer other transliterations of this pronunciation, including Ῥομφά, Ῥεμφάν, Ῥεμφάμ, and Ῥεφάν. It is likely in reference to "Kiyyun" ("Chiun") mentioned in Amos 5:26, (Note: Also transliterated as Chiun, Kewan, Kaiwan, Kiyuwn, or Kijun.) which the Septuagint renders as "Raiphan" (Ῥαιφάν) or "Rephan". Kiyyun is generally assumed to be the god Saturn, the Assyrian name of which was "Kayvân" ("Kēwān").

== Christian analysis ==
In Moses and Aaron (1625), Thomas Godwyn claimed Kiyyun and the Star of Remphan should be held as separate entities; the first is a reference to the deity Heracles, and the latter is a reference to a painted mark on the forehead of Molech.

In the 18th century, Christian Gottlieb Wolff referenced the belief that the name actually came from Ancient Egypt, by way of the Ammonites, tying his worship into the period that Diodorus Siculus' history references the king "Remphis", possibly Ramses III, beginning a seven-generation decline of Egyptian civilization.

The August 1862 edition of The Quiver noted, "'The star of your god Remphan' is an expression which causes some difficulty. The star is probably the representation of the star Remphan, which Stephen with cutting reproach calls 'your god'. But who or what was Remphan? […] The fact is, we know but little respecting the false gods worshipped in Syria and Palestine at different times, although the names of many of them have come down to us."

== See also ==
- Ancient Mesopotamian religion
- List of Mesopotamian deities
- Star of David
- Kayvan
- Kajamanu
