= Amos 7 =

Seventh chapter of the Book of Amos in the Hebrew bible

- ← chapter 6 chapter 8 →
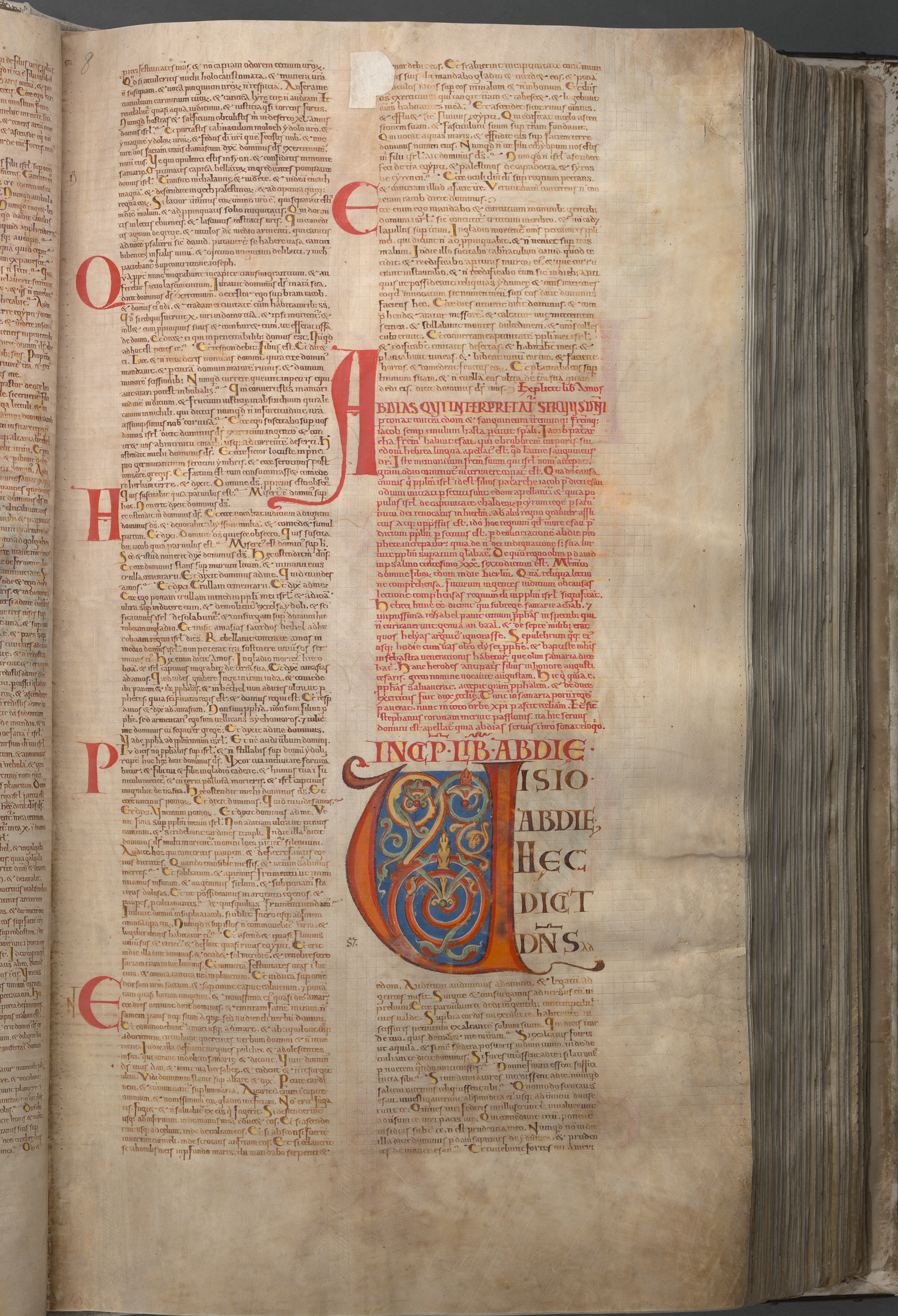
- Book of Amos (5:21–9:15) in Latin in Codex Gigas, made around 13th century.
- Book: Book of Amos
- Category: Nevi'im
- Christian Bible part: Old Testament
- Order in the Christian part: 30

Amos 7 is the seventh chapter of the Book of Amos in the Hebrew Bible or the Old Testament of the Christian Bible. In the Hebrew Bible it is a part of the Book of the Twelve Minor Prophets. This book contains the prophecies attributed to the prophet Amos; in particular, the seventh, eighth, and ninth chapters contain visions and their explanations. This chapter contains three visions: the locusts, the fire (or drought), and the plumb-line. The visions are then "interrupted" by a narrative about Amos and his listeners in Bethel (verses 10–17), before they continue in chapter 8.

== Text ==
The original text was written in Hebrew. This chapter is divided into 17 verses. Some early manuscripts containing the text of this chapter in Hebrew are of the Masoretic Text tradition, which includes the Codex Cairensis (895), the Petersburg Codex of the Prophets (916), Aleppo Codex (10th century), Codex Leningradensis (1008). Fragments cumulatively containing all verses of this chapter in Hebrew were found among the Dead Sea Scrolls including 4Q78 (4QXII^{c}; 75–50 BCE) with extant verses 1–16; 4Q82 (4QXII^{g}; 25 BCE) with extant verses 1, 7–12, 14–17; DSS F.Amos1 (DSS F.181; 1–30 CE) with extant verse 17; and Wadi Murabba'at (MurXII; 75–100 CE) with extant verses 3–6, 8–17.

There is also a translation into Koine Greek known as the Septuagint, made in the last few centuries BCE. Extant ancient manuscripts of the Septuagint version include Codex Vaticanus (B; $\mathfrak{G}$^{B}; 4th century), Codex Alexandrinus (A; $\mathfrak{G}$^{A}; 5th century) and Codex Marchalianus (Q; $\mathfrak{G}$^{Q}; 6th century). (Note: The extant Codex Sinaiticus currently does not have the whole Book of Amos.)

== Verses 1–3: the vision of the locusts ==
Thus the Lord God showed me: Behold, He formed locust swarms at the beginning of the late crop; indeed it was the late crop after the king’s mowings.

Jennifer Dimes suggests that the "king's mowings" was a tax; the Jerusalem Bible suggests that the king exacted a part of the first crop to feed his horses. The "late" or "second" crop suggests a multiple cropping process was in place.

== Verses 4–6: the vision of a fire ==
Thus the Lord God showed me: Behold, the Lord God called for conflict by fire, and it consumed the great deep and devoured the territory.

The Jerusalem Bible associates the fire with a drought, the "first manifestation of the judgment of the LORD", anticipated in Amos 1:2: The green pastures of the shepherds will turn brown and die. Even Mount Carmel will become dry. On the LORD "contending" or "disputing" by fire, Samuel Driver notes the words of Isaiah, for by fire and by His sword, the Lord will judge all flesh.

== Verses 7–9: the plumb-line ==
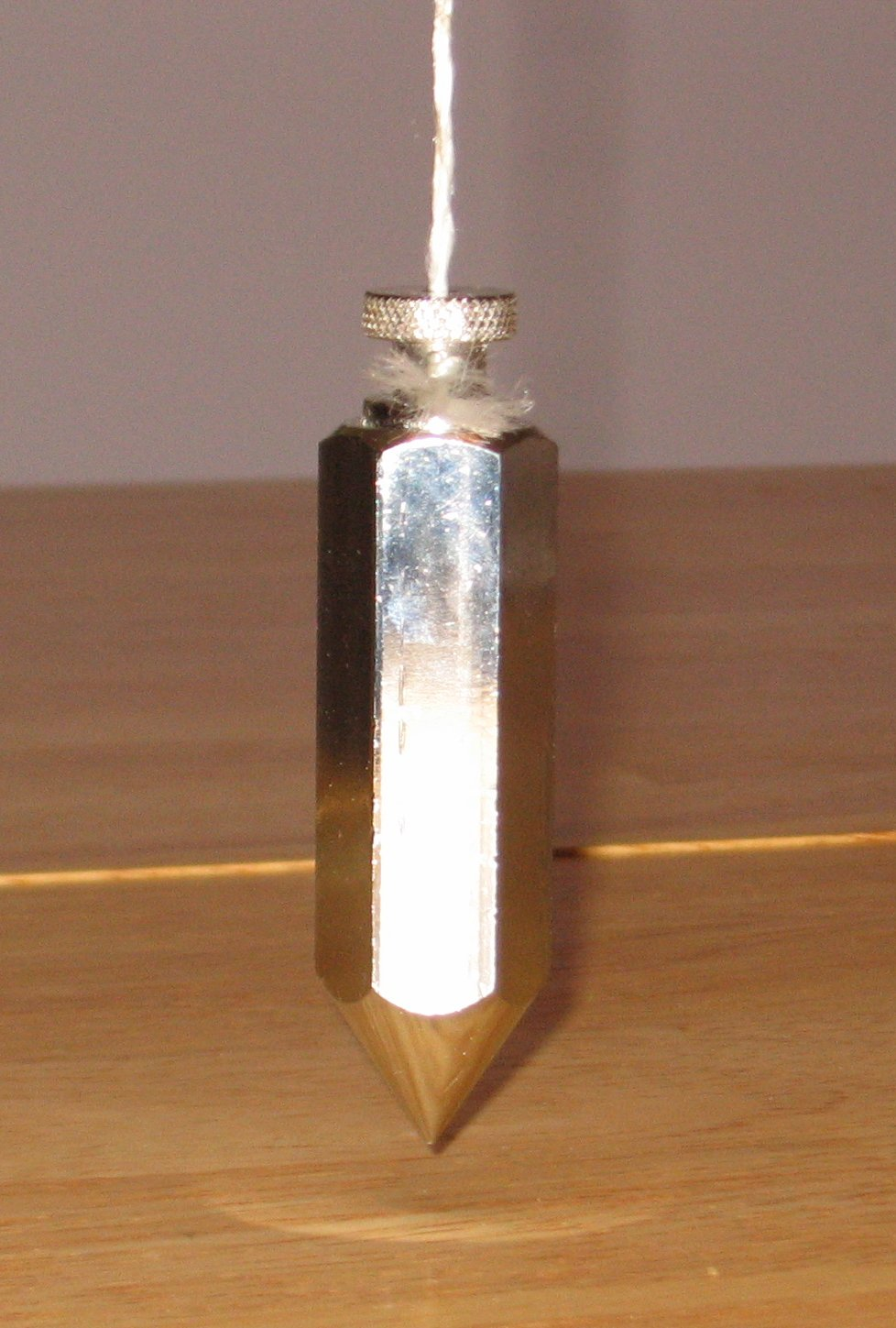
A "plumbline" or "plumb bob"

And the Lord said unto me,

Amos, what seest thou?

And I said, A plumbline.
Then said the Lord,

Behold, I will set a plumbline in the midst of my people Israel:
I will not again pass by them any more:

- "Amos, what seest thou?" God calls the prophet by name, as a familiar friend, just as He said to Moses, "I know you by name" Exodus 33:12, Exodus 33:17. For "the Lord knows them that are His" (2 Timothy 2:19).
- "Plumbline" or "plumb bob"; "plummet": a tool to measure not only for building, but also for pulling down (see 2 Kings 21:13; Isaiah 34:11; Lamentations 2:8), which should be done "in the midst" of the people, that all might be tried individually, and that all might acknowledge the justice of the sentence, which is a complete ruin. The Vulgate Latin version renders it, "a plasterer's" or "mason's trowel"; with which they lay their plaster and mortar on in building: the Septuagint translates as "an adamant", and it is called "anachites" by Pliny, a word in sound near to this here used: the Targum renders it, "judgment": but Jarchi and Aben Ezra observe that in the Arabic tongue it signifies "lead" or "tin", and thus "a line with lead at the end of it".
- "Not … pass by … any more": "not forgive them any more" (Amos 8:2; Proverbs 19:11; Micah 7:18).

== Verses 10–17: Amos and Amaziah ==
In this "historical account of Amaziah's opposition to Amos", Amos is expelled from Bethel, where he had been warning about the impending threat to the northern Kingdom. Michael Coogan suggests that these verses "interrupt" the sequence of visions. Dimes treats this part as a "central narrative" which "demonstrates why judgement is irrevocable". F. E. Gigot considers it "probable" that Amos left Bethel in compliance with Amaziah's directives and "withdrew to Juda[h]". Gary Rendsburg has noted that the verb here always refers to fleeing one's home country to a foreign state, suggesting that his home town of Teqoaʿ was in the Galilee in Samaria and not the Teqoaʿ south of Jerusalem.

== See also ==
- Amaziah
- Friends and Heroes Series 3, Episode 1
- Israel
- Jeroboam
- Jerusalem
- Joash
- Judah
- Uzziah
- Related Bible parts: Amos 1, Amos 2, Amos 8, Amos 9

== Sources ==
- Collins, John J. (2014). Introduction to the Hebrew Scriptures. Fortress Press. ISBN 9781451469233.
- Fitzmyer, Joseph A. (2008). A Guide to the Dead Sea Scrolls and Related Literature. Grand Rapids, MI: William B. Eerdmans Publishing Company. ISBN 9780802862419.
- Hayes, Christine (2015). Introduction to the Bible. Yale University Press. ISBN 978-0300188271.
- Ulrich, Eugene, ed. (2010). The Biblical Qumran Scrolls: Transcriptions and Textual Variants. Brill.
- Würthwein, Ernst (1995). The Text of the Old Testament. Translated by Rhodes, Erroll F. Grand Rapids, MI: Wm. B. Eerdmans. ISBN 0-8028-0788-7.
