= Amos 8 =

Eighth chapter of the Book of Amos

- ← chapter 7 chapter 9 →
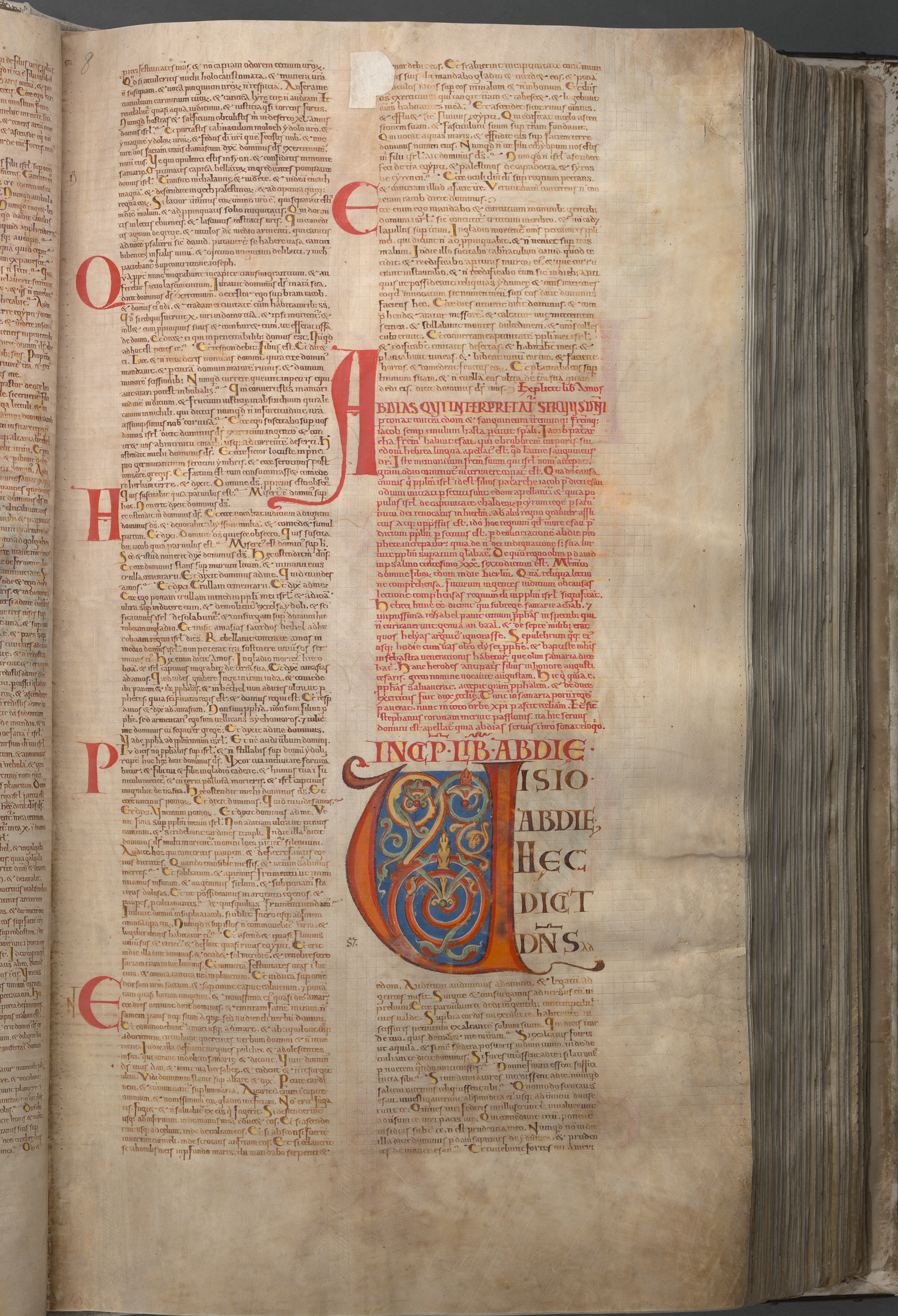
- Book of Amos (5:21–9:15) in Latin in Codex Gigas, made around 13th century.
- Book: Book of Amos
- Category: Nevi'im
- Christian Bible part: Old Testament
- Order in the Christian part: 30

Amos 8 is the eighth chapter of the Book of Amos in the Hebrew Bible or the Old Testament of the Christian Bible. In the Hebrew Bible it is a part of the Book of the Twelve Minor Prophets. This book contains the prophecies attributed to the prophet Amos; in particular, the seventh, eighth, and ninth chapters contain visions and their explanations. This chapter opens with a vision of a basket of summer fruit.

== Text ==
The original text was written in Hebrew. This chapter is divided into 14 verses. Some early manuscripts containing the text of this chapter in Hebrew are of the Masoretic Text tradition, which includes the Codex Cairensis (895), the Petersburg Codex of the Prophets (916), Aleppo Codex (10th century (Note: Since 1947 only parts containing verses 1–11 are extant)), Codex Leningradensis (1008).

Fragments containing parts of this chapter were found among the Dead Sea Scrolls including 4Q82 (4QXII^{g}; 25 BCE) with extant verses 1–5, 11–14; DSS F.Amos1 (DSS F.181; 1–30 CE) with extant verse 1; and Wadi Murabba'at (MurXII; 75–100 CE) with extant verses 3–7, 11–14.

There is also a translation into Koine Greek known as the Septuagint, made in the last few centuries BCE. Extant ancient manuscripts of the Septuagint version include Codex Vaticanus (B; $\mathfrak{G}$^{B}; 4th century), Codex Alexandrinus (A; $\mathfrak{G}$^{A}; 5th century) and Codex Marchalianus (Q; $\mathfrak{G}$^{Q}; 6th century). (Note: Amos is missing from the extant Codex Sinaiticus.)

== The vision of the basket of summer fruit ==
^{1} Thus the Lord God showed me: Behold, a basket of summer fruit. ^{2} And He said, “Amos, what do you see?”

So I said, "A basket of summer fruit."

Then the Lord said to me:

"The end has come upon My people Israel; I will not pass by them anymore.

Biblical commentator Samuel Driver explains:

Partly the thought of Israel's ripeness for judgement, but chiefly the Hebrew word ḳêtz, "end", brings up before the prophet's mental eye in his vision, ... the basket of ḳaitz, "summer fruit". Similarly, in Jeremiah's inaugural vision (Jeremiah 1:11-12), the thought of Jehovah’s watching (shôḳçd) over His word to perform it, produces by association of sounds the image of the almond-tree (shâḳçd), the symbolism of which is afterwards explained, as that of the "summer fruit" is explained here.

The two words, ḳêtz and ḳaitz, are similar in sound, but they are not connected etymologically.

The resolution, I will not pass by them anymore, or Driver's preferred wording I will not again pardon it any more, reflects similar wording in Amos 7:8.

== Verse 8 ==
Shall not the land tremble for this,

and every one mourn that dwelleth therein?

and it shall rise up wholly as a flood;

and it shall be cast out and drowned,

as by the flood of Egypt.

- "cast out and drowned": "swept away and overwhelmed", as the land adjoining the Nile is by it, when flooding (Amos 9:5). The Nile rises generally twenty feet. The waters then "cast out" mire and dirt (Isaiah 57:20).

== Verse 11 ==
Behold, the days come, saith the Lord God,

that I will send a famine in the land,

not a famine of bread, nor a thirst for water,

but of hearing the words of the Lord:

- "Famine": When the light of God's revelation is withdrawn, the longing for the Word, will remain unsatisfied, like that of Saul (1 Samuel 28:6), just like the psalmist grieves: "We see not our signs; there is no more any prophet; neither is there among us any that knoweth how long" (Psalm 74:9); but it will be in vain (cf. Lamentations 2:9; Ezekiel 7:26; Micah 3:7).
- "Not a famine for bread": There could be both bodily and spiritual famine, such as stated, "the famine of the word of the Lord." Saul, in his extremity, "inquired of the Lord and He answered him not, neither by dreams, nor by Urim, nor by prophets" 1 Samuel 28:6. Jeroboam sent his wife to inquire of the prophet Ahijah about his son's health (1 Kings 14:2–3). They sought for temporal relief only, and therefore found it not.
- "A thirst for water": the destruction by thirst is the most afflictive manner (Hosea 2:3). Lysimachus is said to part with his kingdom for a draught of water; and the torments of hell are set forth by a violent thirst for it (Luke 16:24); but something worse than either of these is here threatened.
- "The words of the Lord": are the Scriptures, the word of prophecy, and the preaching of the word, or explaining the Scriptures. Hearing them signifies the preaching of them (Isaiah 53:1) for by hearing comes a great blessing.

== See also ==
- Beersheba
- Brook of Egypt
- Dan
- Israel
- Nile
- Samaria
- Related Bible parts: Amos 2, Amos 7, Romans 1

== Sources ==
- Collins, John J. (2014). Introduction to the Hebrew Scriptures. Fortress Press. ISBN 9781451469233.
- Fitzmyer, Joseph A. (2008). A Guide to the Dead Sea Scrolls and Related Literature. Grand Rapids, MI: William B. Eerdmans Publishing Company. ISBN 9780802862419.
- Hayes, Christine (2015). Introduction to the Bible. Yale University Press. ISBN 978-0300188271.
- Ulrich, Eugene, ed. (2010). The Biblical Qumran Scrolls: Transcriptions and Textual Variants. Brill.
- Würthwein, Ernst (1995). The Text of the Old Testament. Translated by Rhodes, Erroll F. Grand Rapids, MI: Wm. B. Eerdmans. ISBN 0-8028-0788-7.
