= Amos 1 =

- ← Joel 3 Chapter 2 →
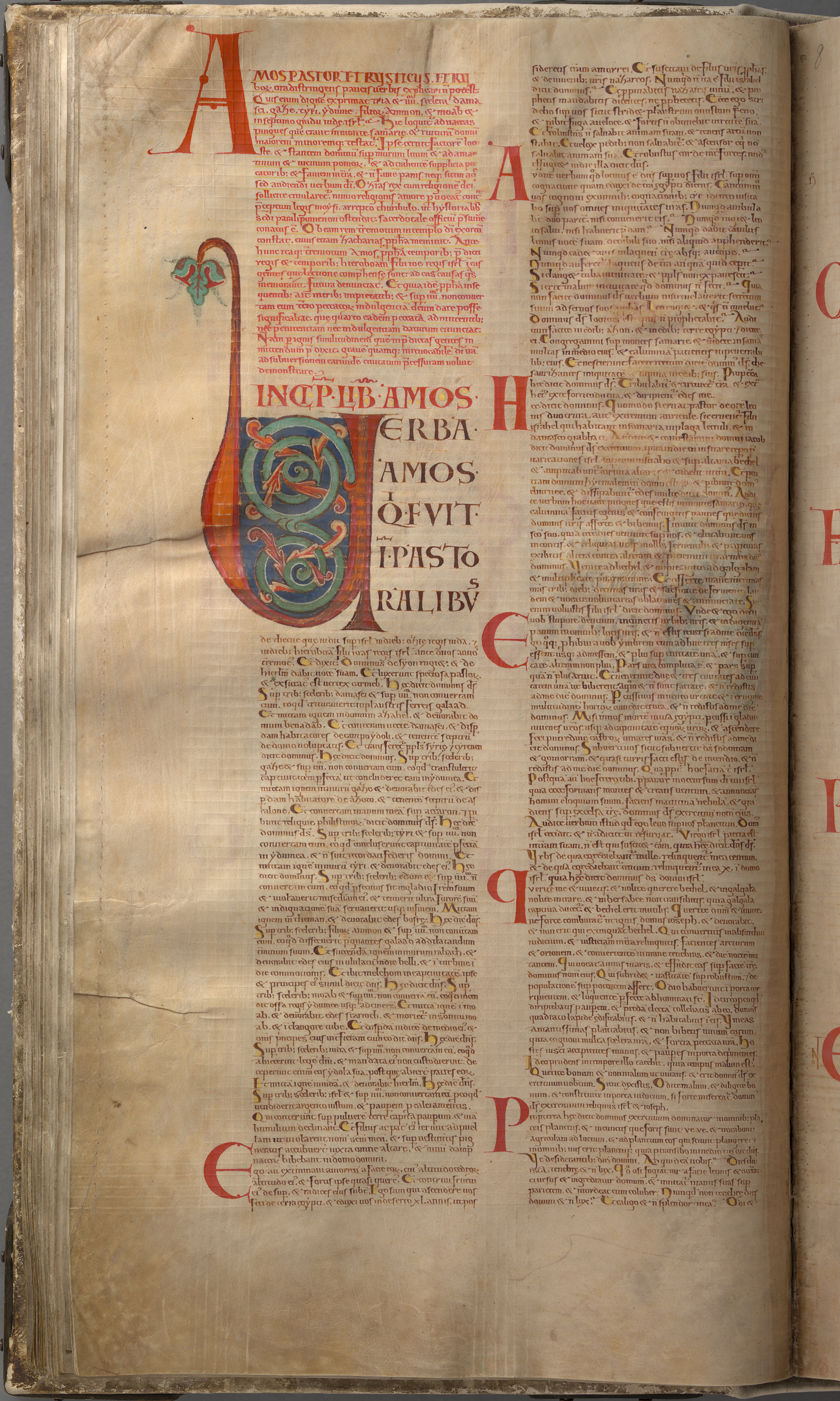
- Book of Amos (1:1–5:21) in Latin in Codex Gigas, made around 13th century.
- Book: Book of Amos
- Category: Nevi'im
- Christian Bible part: Old Testament
- Order in the Christian part: 30

Amos 1 is the first chapter of the Book of Amos in the Hebrew Bible or the Old Testament of the Christian Bible. This book contains the prophecies attributed to the prophet Amos, and is a part of the Book of the Twelve Minor Prophets. This chapter contains prophecies of God's judgments on Israel's neighbours, Syria, Philistia, Tyre, Edom, and Ammon. Judgments on Moab, and on Israel itself, follow in chapter 2.

== Text ==
The original text was written in Hebrew. This chapter is divided into 15 verses.

Some early manuscripts containing the text of this chapter in Hebrew are of the Masoretic Text tradition, which includes the Codex Cairensis (895), the Petersburg Codex of the Prophets (916), Aleppo Codex (10th century), Codex Leningradensis (1008).

Fragments containing parts of this chapter were found among the Dead Sea Scrolls, including 4Q78 (4QXII^{c}; 75–50 BCE) with extant verse 1?; 4Q82 (4QXII^{g}; 25 BCE) with extant verses 3‑7, 9–15; 5Q4 (5QAmos; 50 BCE–50 CE) with extant verses 2–‑5 and Wadi Murabba'at (MurXII; 75–100 CE) with extant verses 5–15

There is also a translation into Koine Greek known as the Septuagint, made in the last few centuries BCE. Extant ancient manuscripts of the Septuagint version include Codex Vaticanus (B; $\mathfrak{G}$^{B}; 4th century), Codex Alexandrinus (A; $\mathfrak{G}$^{A}; 5th century) and Codex Marchalianus (Q; $\mathfrak{G}$^{Q}; 6th century). (Note: The extant Codex Sinaiticus currently does not have the whole Book of Amos.)

== Structure ==
The New King James Version groups this chapter into:

- Amos 1:1–2 = Title
- Amos 1:3–5 = Judgment on Damascus
- Amos 1:6–8 = Judgment on Gaza
- Amos 1:9–10 = Judgment on Tyre
- Amos 1:11–12 = Judgment on Edom
- Amos 1:13–15 = Judgment on Ammon

== Title (1:1–2) ==
=== Verse 1 ===
The words of Amos, who was among the herdmen of Tekoa,
which he saw concerning Israel

in the days of Uzziah king of Judah,
and in the days of Jeroboam the son of Joash king of Israel,

two years before the earthquake.

- "The words": the same phrase is used in the beginning of the Book of Jeremiah (Jeremiah 1:1), and Ecclesiastes (Ecclesiastes 1:1). According to the Pulpit Commentary, the "words" are not of Amos, but of God or Jehovah, as shown by the succeeding clause, "which he saw".
- "Amos" (meaning in Hebrew "a burden") was a shepherd of Tekoa, a small town of Judah, a region more fit for pastoral than for agricultural purposes. Amos therefore owned and tended flocks, and collected sycamore figs. Amos 7:14, 15) implies that Amos belongs to a "humble rank".
- "Herdmen" (Hebrew: noked): the same as found in 2 Kings 3:4, applied to Mesha, King of Moab, a great "sheepmaster": hence some have considered that Amos was not a mere mercenary, but a rich possessor of flocks. However (Amos 7:14, 15) states that his position is of a "poor labouring man".
- "Concerning Israel" or rather "upon Israel": heavy words coming upon the heavy transgressions of Israel. The preceding word "saw" is not of mere sight, but of a vision given by God. Amos only says that they were "his" words, in order immediately to add, that they came to him from God, that he himself was but the human organ through which God spake.
- "Tekoa", a small town of Judah, six miles southeast from Bethlehem, and twelve from Jerusalem, on the borders of the great desert (2 Chronicles 20:20; compare 2 Chronicles 11:6). The region being sandy was more fit for pastoral than for agricultural purposes. Maundrell says it is nine miles distant, to the south of it; and, according to Jerome, it was twelve miles from Jerusalem; although he says elsewhere, that "Thecua", or Tekoa, is a village at this day, nine miles from Aelia or Jerusalem, of which place was Amos the prophet, and where his sepulchre is seen: either there is a mistake of the number, or of Aelia for Bethlehem; the former rather seems to be the case; according to Josephus, it was not far from the castle of Herodium.
- "Two years before the earthquake": which was well known in those times, and fresh in memory. Zechariah speaks of it many years after, mentioning that it was in the days of Uzziah, Zechariah 14:5. The Jewish writers generally say that it was when Uzziah was smote with leprosy for invading the priest's office; and was in the year in which he died, when Isaiah had a vision of the glory of the Lord, and the posts of the house moved, Isaiah 6:1; and with whom Josephus agrees; who also relates, that "the temple being rent by the earthquake, the bright light of the sun shone upon the king's face, and the leprosy immediately seized him; and, at a place before the city called Eroge, half part of a mountain towards the west was broken and rolled half a mile towards the eastern part, and there stood, and stopped up the ways, and the king's gardens"; but this cannot be true, as Theodoret observes; since, according to this account, Amos must begin to prophesy in the fiftieth year of Uzziah; for he reigned fifty two years, and he began his reign in the twenty seventh year of Jeroboam, 2 Kings 15:1; who reigned forty one years, 2 Kings 14:23; so that Uzziah and he were contemporary fourteen years only, and Jeroboam must have been dead thirty six years when it was the fiftieth of Uzziah; whereas they are here represented as contemporary when Amos began to prophesy, which was but two years before the earthquake; so that this earthquake must be in the former and not the latter part of Uzziah's reign, and consequently not when he was stricken with the leprosy.

=== Verse 2 ===
And he said, The Lord will roar from Zion,

and utter his voice from Jerusalem;

and the habitations of the shepherds shall mourn,

and the top of Carmel shall wither.

Cross reference: Amos 7:4 and Joel 3:16

== Numerical proverbs ==
The verses which introduce God's judgments on Israel and her neighbours, in this chapter and in chapter 2, all use a literary device known as a numerical proverb or graded numerical sequence. They indicate an indefinite quantity, and also indicate Amos' intention "to treat his subject poetically". These verses have an affinity with the numerical proverbs of Proverbs 30:15-33.

== Eighth century earthquake ==
Creationist geologist Steven A. Austin and his colleagues suggested in 2000 that widely separated archaeological excavations in the countries of Israel and Jordan contain late Iron Age (Iron IIb) architecture bearing damage from a great earthquake. Earthquake debris at six sites (Hazor, Deir 'Alla, Gezer, Lachish, Tell Judeideh, and 'En Haseva), is tightly confined stratigraphically to the middle of the 8th century BC, with dating errors of ~30 years. This particular seismic event is further confirmed in 2019 by geologists studying layers of sediment on the floor of the Dead Sea.

Amos of Tekoa delivered a speech at the Temple of the Golden Calf in the city of Bethel in the northern kingdom of Israel just "two years before the earthquake" (Amos 1:1), in the middle of eighth century BC when Uzziah was king of Judah and Jeroboam II was king of Israel. Amos spoke of the land being shaken (Amos 8:8), houses being smashed (Amos 6:11), altars being cracked (Amos 3:14), and even the Temple at Bethel being struck and collapsing (Amos 9:1). The Amos' Earthquake impacted Hebrew literature immensely. After the gigantic earthquake, no Hebrew prophet could predict a divine visitation in judgment without alluding to an earthquake. Just a few years after the earthquake, Isaiah wrote about the "Day of the Lord" when everything lofty and exalted will be abased at the time when the Lord "ariseth to shake terribly the earth" (Isaiah 2:19, 21). Then, Isaiah saw the Lord in a temple shaken by an earthquake (Isaiah 6:4). Joel repeats the motto of Amos: "The Lord also will roar out of Zion, and utter his voice from Jerusalem," and adds the seismic theophany imagery "the heavens and the earth shall shake" (Joel 3:16; compare Amos 1:2). After describing a future earthquake and panic during the "Day of the Lord" at Messiah's coming to the Mount of Olives, Zechariah says, "Yea, ye shall flee, like as ye fled from before the earthquake in the days of Uzziah king of Judah" (Zechariah 14:5). The panic caused by Amos' Earthquake must have been the topic of legend in Jerusalem, because Zechariah asked his readers to recall that terrifying event 230 years later.

In 2005 seismologist Nicholas Ambraseys reviewed the literature on historical earthquakes in Jerusalem and specifically the 'Amos' earthquake. He states that "Modern writers date the earthquake to 759 BC and assign to it a magnitude of 8.2, with an intensity in Jerusalem between VIII and IX." He believes that such an earthquake "should have razed Jerusalem to the ground" and states that there is no physical or textual evidence for this. Discussing Zechariah's mention of an earthquake, he suggests that it was a 5th or 4th century insertion and discusses various versions of the passage which describe the event in different ways. He suggests that the differences may be due to a confused reading of the Hebrew words for “shall be stopped up” (ve-nistam), and “you shall flee" (ve-nastem)" and that "by adopting the latter reading as more plausible in relation to the natural phenomenon described, it is obvious that there is no other explanation than a large landslide, which may or may not had been triggered by this or by another earthquake." He also states that a search for changes in the ground resembling those described in Zechariah revealed "no direct or indirect evidence that Jerusalem was damaged." Nonetheless, this earthquake appears to be the largest ever documented on the Dead Sea transform fault zone during the last four millennia.

== See also ==
- Ammon
- Carmel
- Damascus
- Edom
- Gaza
- Israel

′* Jeroboam, king of Israel

- Jerusalem
- Joash, king of Israel
- Moab
- Tyre
- Uzziah, king of Judah
- Related Bible parts: Joel 3, Amos 2, Amos 7, Obadiah, Zechariah 14

== Sources ==
- Collins, John J. (2014). Introduction to the Hebrew Scriptures. Fortress Press. ISBN 9781451469233.
- Fitzmyer, Joseph A. (2008). A Guide to the Dead Sea Scrolls and Related Literature. Grand Rapids, MI: William B. Eerdmans Publishing Company. ISBN 9780802862419.
- Hayes, Christine (2015). Introduction to the Bible. Yale University Press. ISBN 978-0300188271.
- Ulrich, Eugene, ed. (2010). The Biblical Qumran Scrolls: Transcriptions and Textual Variants. Brill.
- Würthwein, Ernst (1995). The Text of the Old Testament. Translated by Rhodes, Erroll F. Grand Rapids, MI: Wm. B. Eerdmans. ISBN 0-8028-0788-7.
