= Amos 9 =

- ← chapter 8 Obadiah →
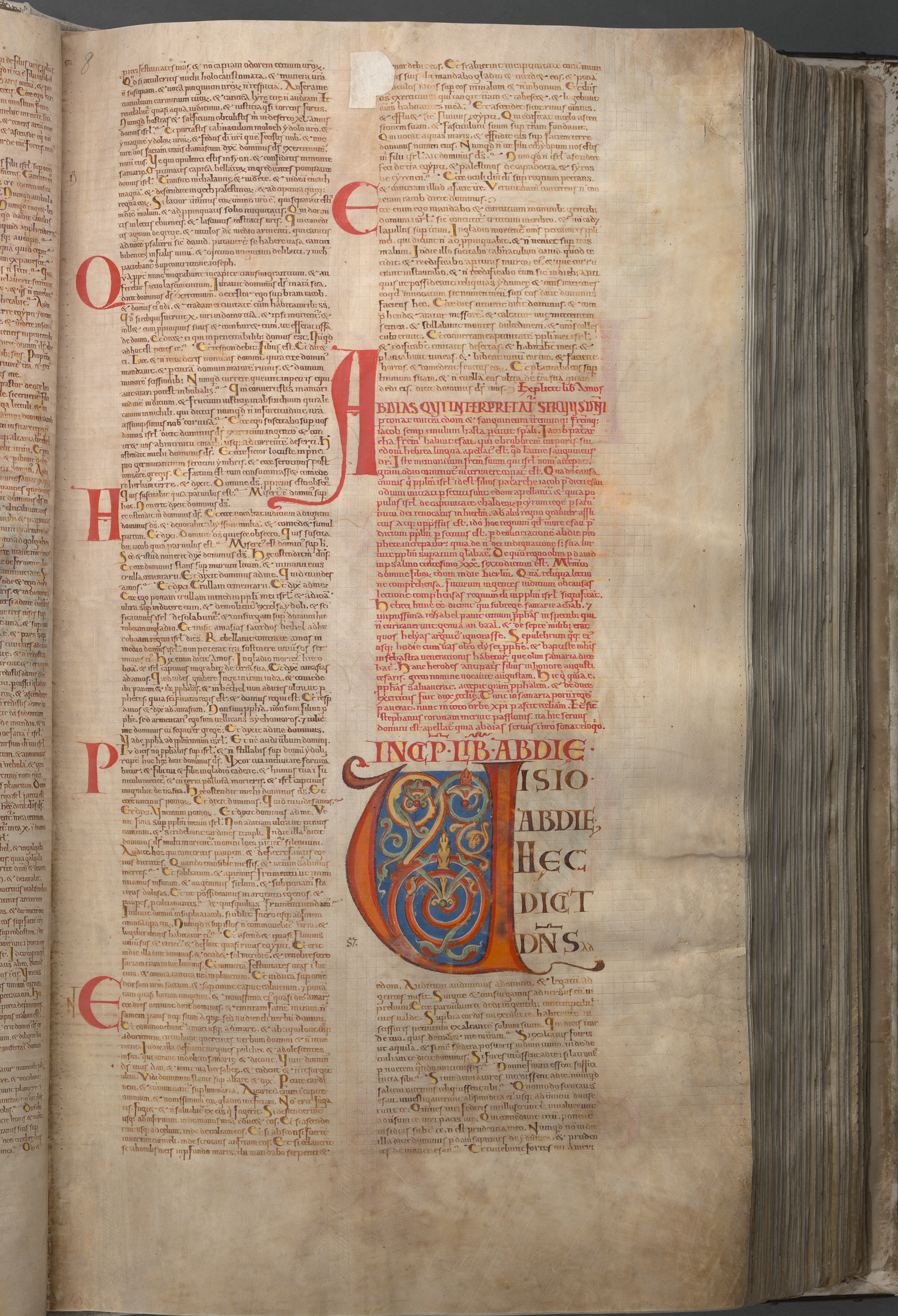
- Book of Amos (5:21–9:15) in Latin in Codex Gigas, made around 13th century.
- Book: Book of Amos
- Category: Nevi'im
- Christian Bible part: Old Testament
- Order in the Christian part: 30

Amos 9 is the ninth and last chapter of the Book of Amos in the Hebrew Bible or the Old Testament of the Christian Bible. In the Hebrew Bible it is a part of the Book of the Twelve Minor Prophets. This book contains the prophecies attributed to the prophet Amos; in particular, the seventh, eighth, and ninth chapters contain visions and their explanations.

== Text ==
The original text was written in Hebrew. This chapter is divided into 15 verses. Some early manuscripts containing the text of this chapter in Hebrew are of the Masoretic Text tradition, which includes the Codex Cairensis (895), the Petersburg Codex of the Prophets (916), and Codex Leningradensis (1008). (Note: Since 1947 the whole chapter is missing from Aleppo Codex.)

Fragments containing parts of this chapter were found among the Dead Sea Scrolls including 4Q82 (4QXII^{g}; 25 BCE) with extant verses 1, 5–6, 14–15; and Wadi Murabba'at (MurXII; 75–100 CE) with extant verses 1–15.

There is also a translation into Koine Greek known as the Septuagint, made in the last few centuries BCE. Extant ancient manuscripts of the Septuagint version include Codex Vaticanus (B; $\mathfrak{G}$^{B}; 4th century), Codex Alexandrinus (A; $\mathfrak{G}$^{A}; 5th century) and Codex Marchalianus (Q; $\mathfrak{G}$^{Q}; 6th century). (Note: Book of Amos is missing in the extant Codex Sinaiticus.)

== Contents and commentary ==
Commentator Jennifer Dimes notes a similarity between Amos 9:13-15, Hosea 14:4-8 and Joel 3:18 (Joel 4:18 in Hebrew chapter numbering): in each case there are promises of restoration held out at the end of the words of each prophet.

=== Verse 9 ===
For, lo, I will command,

and I will sift the house of Israel among all nations,

like as corn is sifted in a sieve,

yet shall not the least grain fall upon the earth.

- "Sift": The Israelites were to be tossed about through all nations as corn is shaken about in a sieve, in such a way that while the chaff and dust (the wicked) fall through (perish), all the solid grains (the godly elect) remain (are preserved), (Romans 11:26; Jeremiah 3:14). So spiritual Israel's final safety is ensured (Luke 22:32; John 10:28; 6:39).

=== Verse 11 ===
[The Lord says:] "In that day will I raise up the tabernacle of David that is fallen,

and close up the breaches thereof;

and I will raise up his ruins,

and I will build it as in the days of old:"

This verse is quoted in the New Testament by James, brother of Jesus (Acts 15:16, 27) (mostly from the Greek translation) to confirm that the Church of God is open to all people, Jews or Gentiles.

- "The tabernacle": (Hebrew: sukkah) or "hut", "tent" (as Jonah 4:5); a "little house" (Amos 6:11).
- "Fallen...breaches...ruins" In the Talmud, the Messiah (in Greek: "Christ") is called "the Son of the fallen." Amos heaps upon one another the words implying destruction, referring to the fall of David's kingdom into ruins by the Chaldeans, but the fallen "hut of David" will be "raised up", "'their (feminine form)' breaches" will be "closed up" (literally "walled up") and "'his' ruins" will be "built" up by God "that 'they' (masculine form; verse 12) may inherit". Using a variety of numbers and genders, this verse and the next one speak of one living whole, the 'Jewish Church', that once was "breached" in two by the great schism of Jeroboam, but will be reunited into one body, "as in the days of old", before the separation of the ten tribes, when all Israel worshiped as one. Interpreted spiritually, it foreshadows the rising of the universal Church of Christ from that of the Jews.

=== Verse 12 ===
"that they may possess the remnant of Edom

and all the nations who are called by my name,"

declares the Lord who does this.

- "Edom" from אֱדוֹם֙, Septuagint renders it as "mankind" (cf. Acts 15:17).

=== Verse 14 ===
And I will bring again the captivity of my people of Israel,

and they shall build the waste cities, and inhabit them;

and they shall plant vineyards, and drink the wine thereof;

they shall also make gardens, and eat the fruit of them.

- "And I will bring again the captivity of my people of Israel": This does not refer to the captivity of the Jews in Babylon, or the disposition by the Romans, when the Jews were dispersed among the nations again; but the captivity both of Judah and Israel that the Jews will be brought back, and delivered from it, to return to their own land, and possess it as long as it is a land; see Jeremiah 30:39; as well as be freed from the bondage of Satan and the law, under which they have been detained some hundreds of years; but now shall be delivered into the glorious liberty of the children of God.
- "build the waste cities": (Isaiah 61:4; Ezekiel 36:33–36).

== See also ==
- Aram (disambiguation)
- Caphtor
- Carmel
- Edom
- Ethiopia
- Jacob
- Kir
- Philistine
- Israel
- Nile River
- Samaria
- Syria
- Related Bible parts: Amos 2, Amos 7, Amos 8, Acts 15

== Sources ==
- Collins, John J. (2014). Introduction to the Hebrew Scriptures. Fortress Press. ISBN 9781451469233.
- Fitzmyer, Joseph A. (2008). A Guide to the Dead Sea Scrolls and Related Literature. Grand Rapids, MI: William B. Eerdmans Publishing Company. ISBN 9780802862419.
- Hayes, Christine (2015). Introduction to the Bible. Yale University Press. ISBN 978-0300188271.
- Ulrich, Eugene, ed. (2010). The Biblical Qumran Scrolls: Transcriptions and Textual Variants. Brill.
- Würthwein, Ernst (1995). The Text of the Old Testament. Translated by Rhodes, Erroll F. Grand Rapids, MI: Wm. B. Eerdmans. ISBN 0-8028-0788-7.
