= Amaziah =

Amaziah or Amasias (in the Douay-Rheims translation) (Hebrew: אֲמַצְיָה, "strengthened by God"; Latin: Amasias) may refer to:

- Amaziah of Judah, the king of Judah
- A Levite, son of Hilkiah, of the descendants of Ethan the Merarite (1 Chronicles 6:45)
- Amaziah (Book of Amos), a priest of the golden calves at Bethel (Amos 7:10-17)
- The father of Joshah, one of the leaders of the tribe of Simeon in the time of Hezekiah (1 Chr. 4:34)
