= Amatzia =

Amatzia (Hebrew: אמציה) may refer to:

== Places ==
- Amatzia (moshav), a moshav in south-central Israel in the Lakhish Regional Council

== People ==
- Amaziah of Judah, a king of Judah in the Book of Kings

== See also ==
- Amaziah
