= Amaziah (Book of Amos) =

Amaziah was an idolatrous priest of Bethel (Amos 7:10–17), who lived during the reign of Jeroboam II of the Kingdom of Samaria. Amaziah banned Amos from prophesying against Israel. Francis Gigot considers it "probable" that Amos left Bethel in compliance with Amaziah's directives, and "withdrew to Juda[h]".

In the seventh chapter of the Book of Amos, Amaziah sends message to King Jeroboam II and tells him that Amos is conspiring against him, and that he, the King, shall die by the sword, and Israel will go to exile (Amos 7:10-12). Amaziah then goes to Amos and tells him to go away, return to Judea, and make a living from prophecying there. In retort, Amos prophecies harshly on Amaziah, saying that "Thy wife shall be an harlot in the city, and thy sons and thy daughters shall fall by the sword, and thy land shall be divided by line; and thou shalt die in a polluted land: and Israel shall surely go into captivity forth of his land." (Amos 7:17)

It is uncertain whether Amos's prophecy of Amaziah's fate came to be.

== In Rabbinical literature ==
According to Rabbi Meir, the priest Amaziah is identical to the false prophet mentioned in I Kings, xiii. 11 et seq. (Yer. Sanh. xi. 30b and Cant. R. ii. 5).
