= Land of Kir =

Location in the Hebrew Bible

The Land of Kir is a location mentioned in the Hebrew Bible, where the Arameans are said to have originated. It is also the place to which Tiglath-Pileser III of Assyria carried the Aramean captives after he had taken the city of Damascus and conquered the kingdom of Aram-Damascus (2 Kings 16:9; Amos 1:5; 9:7). Isaiah 22:6 mentions it together with Elam, implying an association between the two. This "Kir" is situated east of the Euprates or the Tigris River. Some scholars have supposed that Kir is a variant of Cush (Susiana), on the south of Elam. Other scholars believe that the Land of Kir is a location at Carma, an ancient city on banks of the Mardus River in modern-day Iran, or an area on the Kar River in the northern reaches of Ancient Armenia. Some Jewish scholars believe the Land of Kir to be located at Ihi Dekirah, a place east of the Euphrates River about halfway between Anah and Babylon, near Hīt in modern-day Iraq. They consider the liberation of Arameans from Kir to be equivalent to their westward expansion during the United Monarchy era or their ability to control Nineveh after Tiglath-Pileser I conquered them in Ihi Dekirah.

== See also ==
- Amos 9
- Isaiah 22
- Kir of Moab
