= Luz (biblical place) =

Places mentioned in Hebrew Bible

Luz (Hebrew: ל֥וּז Lūz) is the name of two places in the Bible.

== Biblical texts ==
=== In Genesis ===
Luz is the ancient name of a royal Canaanite city, connected with Bethel in Genesis 28:19 and 35:6. According to Genesis 28:19, Luz was renamed by Jacob: "Then he named that place Bethel; but previously the name of the city had been Luz." Bethel means "the house of God": the place was where Jacob dreamed of his "ladder" ascending to heaven, where "the angels of God were ascending and descending on it".

=== In Joshua ===
In the Book of Joshua, the border of the land allocated to the Tribe of Benjamin is said to run "up to the shoulder north of Jericho, then up through the hill country westward, and it ends at the wilderness of Beth-aven. From there the boundary passes along southward in the direction of Luz, to the shoulder of Luz (that is, Bethel), then the boundary goes down to Ataroth-addar, on the mountain that lies south of Lower Beth-horon".

=== In the Book of Judges ===
A second city called Luz, founded by a man who came from the original Luz, is mentioned in Judges 1:23-26:

While the House of Joseph were scouting at Bethel (the name of the town was formerly Luz), their patrols saw someone leaving the town. They said to him, "Just show us how to get into the town, and we will treat you kindly." He showed them how to get into the town; they put the town to the sword, but they let the man and all his relatives go free. The man went to the Hittite country. He founded a city and named it Luz, and that has been its name to this day.

== Identity ==
According to Rashi, it is debated whether Luz and Bethel represent the same town - the former being its Canaanite name, and the latter its Hebrew name - or whether they were distinct places in close proximity to each other. Wesley I. Toews, in the Anchor Bible Dictionary, suggests that "the note that identifies Bethel with Luz in [Joshua] 18:13 might be judged an interpolation, especially if one understood Beth-aven of 18:12 to be a distortion of Bethel", and so they may be distinct but related sites.
