= Amos 2 =

Chapter in the Hebrew Bible

- ← chapter 1 chapter 3 →
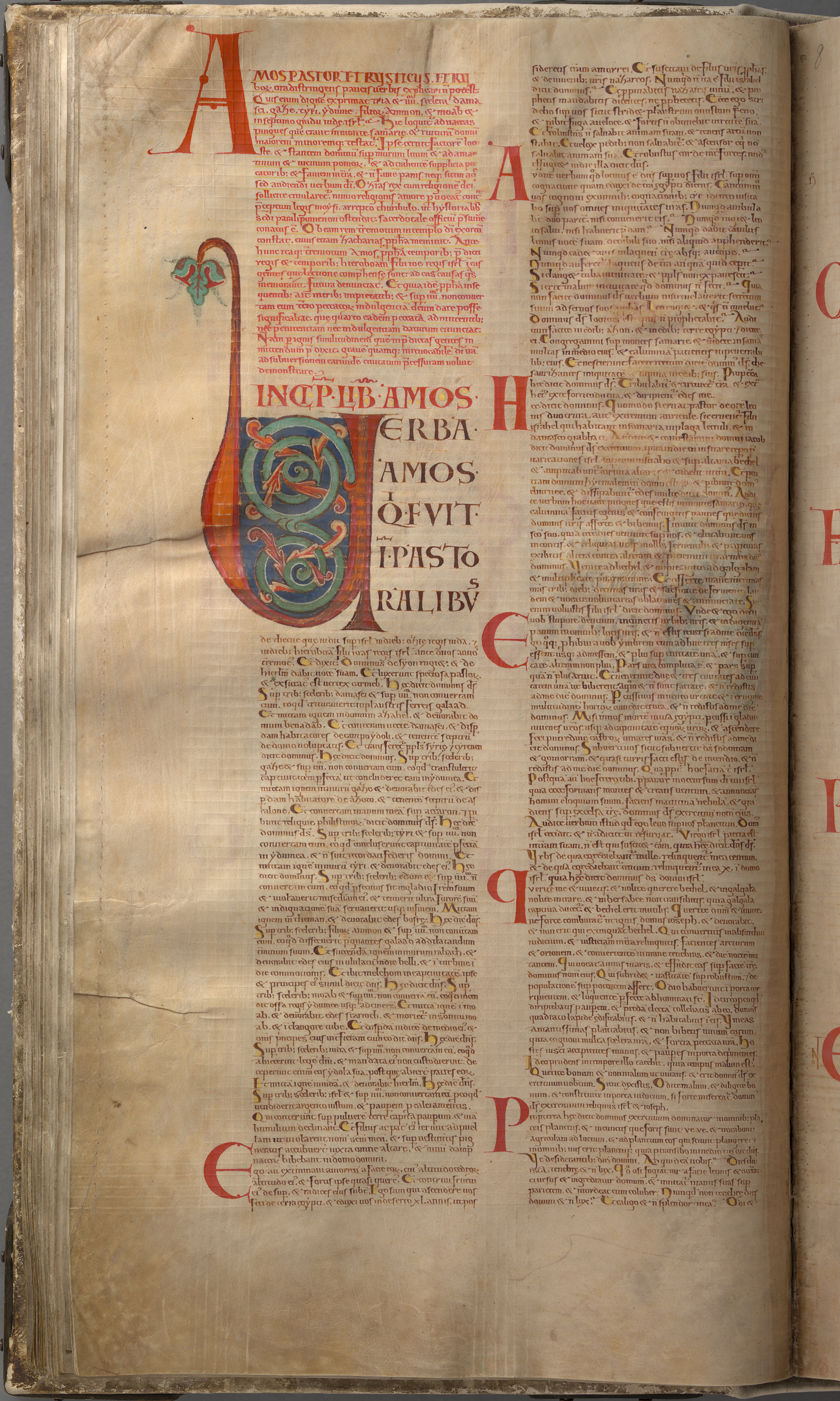
- Book of Amos (1:1–5:21) in Latin in Codex Gigas, made around 13th century.
- Book: Book of Amos
- Category: Nevi'im
- Christian Bible part: Old Testament
- Order in the Christian part: 30

Amos 2 is the second chapter of the Book of Amos in the Hebrew Bible or the Old Testament of the Christian Bible. In the Hebrew Bible, Amos is a part of the Book of the Twelve Minor Prophets. The book contains prophecies attributed to the prophet Amos. This chapter contains his prophecies regarding God's judgment against Moab, Judah, and Israel, following a pattern established in chapter 1.

== Text ==
The original text was written in Hebrew. This chapter is divided into 16 verses. Some early manuscripts containing the text of this chapter in Hebrew are of the Masoretic Text tradition, which includes the Codex Cairensis (895), the Petersburg Codex of the Prophets (916), Aleppo Codex (10th century), Codex Leningradensis (1008).

Fragments containing parts of this chapter were found among the Dead Sea Scrolls including 4Q78 (4QXII^{c}; 75–50 BCE) with extant verses 11–16; 4Q82 (4QXII^{g}; 25 BCE) with extant verses 1, 7–9, 15–16; and Wadi Murabba'at (MurXII; 75–100 CE) with extant verse 1.

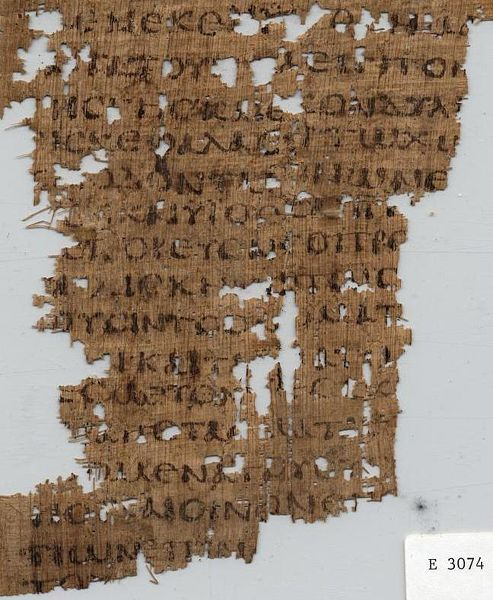
POxy VI 846: Amos 2 (LXX)

There is also a translation into Koine Greek known as the Septuagint, made in the last few centuries BCE. Extant ancient manuscripts of the Septuagint version include Codex Vaticanus (B; $\mathfrak{G}$^{B}; 4th century), Codex Alexandrinus (A; $\mathfrak{G}$^{A}; 5th century), Codex Marchalianus (Q; $\mathfrak{G}$^{Q}; 6th century) (Note: The extant Codex Sinaiticus currently does not have the whole Book of Amos.) and Papyrus Oxyrhynchus 846 (~550 CE; with extant verses 6–12).

== Contents and commentary ==
This chapter continues the use of the numerical proverb format established in chapter 1.

=== Oracle against Moab (Verses 1–3) ===
Despite the literary closures, this oracle seems to form a larger pattern with the others. The Moabites were related to Lot and therefore to Abraham and his descendants. The crime of Moab probably is more about sacrilege (cf. Jeremiah 8:1–3; cf. 2 Kings 23:16–20), with bones mentioned also in 6:9–10; verse 2b echoing 1:14b; and the trumpet reappears in 3:6, in a similar context (cf. Exodus 19:13, 16,19).

^{1}Thus says the Lord:
For three transgressions of Moab, and for four,
I will not turn away its punishment,
Because he burned the bones of the king of Edom to lime.
^{2}But I will send a fire upon Moab,
And it shall devour the palaces of Kerioth;
Moab shall die with tumult,
With shouting and trumpet sound.
^{3}And I will cut off the judge from its midst,
And slay all its princes with him,
Says the LORD.

- "He burned the bones of the King of Edom into lime": This profanation of the corpse by the Moabite people (cf. 2 Kings 23:16; Jeremiah 8:1, 2) is not mentioned in any historical documents. Some historical commentators, such as Jacobus Tirinus (1580–1636) and Cornelius a Lapide (1567–1637), think that the prophet wants to show that 'the sympathy of God extends beyond the covenant people, and that he punishes wrongs inflicted even on heathen nations'. The event probably happened in relation to the coalition of the king of Edom with Jehoram and Jehoshaphat against Mesha, the King of Moab (2 Kings 3:7, 9), who made inscription on Mesha Stele at Dibon mentioned the war against Edom (unfortunately only some texts remain, as follows: "And Chemosh said to me, Go down, make war against Horonaim [i.e. the men of Edom], and take... Chemosh... in my days. Wherefore I made... year ... and I..."). Jerome quotes a Jewish tradition stating that after this war the Moab people dug up and dishonored the bones of king of Edom in revenge for the assistance he had given to the Israelites. Edom was then a vassal of Judah, but regained its independence about ten years later (2 Kings 8:20).
- 'Sound', in verse 2, is qol, cf. Amos 1:2.

=== Oracle against Judah (verses 4-5) ===
Thus says the Lord:
"For three transgressions of Judah,

and for four, I will not revoke the punishment,

because they have rejected the law of the Lord,

and have not kept his statutes,

but their lies have led them astray,

those after which their fathers walked."

The editors of the Jerusalem Bible suggest that this oracle may have been a later addition to the text.

- "For three transgressions of Judah": There is no difference in the treatment of Jews and Gentiles (cf. Romans 2:12. "...as many as have signed in the law, shall be judged by the law", as Jerome notes "those other nations, Damascus and the rest, he upbraids not for having cast away the law of God, and despised His commandments, for they had not the written law, but that of nature only. So then of them he says, that "they corrupted all their compassions" ... but Judah ... had the worship of God and the temple and its rites, and had received the law and commandments ... is rebuked and convicted by the Lord, for that it had "cast aside His law and not kept His commandments;" wherefore it should be punished as it deserved".

=== Verse 10 ===
Also I brought you up from the land of Egypt,

and led you forty years through the wilderness,

to possess the land of the Amorite.

- "Also I": (literally, "And I") Used by God to remind the people of the good things he did as a motive to obedience (cf. Exodus 20:2; Deuteronomy 5:6; Deuteronomy 6:12).
- "Forty years through the wilderness": During those "forty years" the law was rehearsed and the people were daily supplied with the manna, the water from the rock, as well as the deliverance from the serpents and other dangers, so the journey through the wilderness was not just a punishment but also a blend of kindness (cf. Deuteronomy 1:31; 29:4–5, 32:10,12).
- "The land of the Amorite": refers to the whole land of Canaan as the Amorites were the principal nation of it in the past.

== See also ==
- Amorites
- Edom
- Egypt
- Israel
- Jerusalem
- Judah
- Kirioth
- Moab
- Nazarite
- Prophet
- Related Bible parts: Amos 1, Amos 7

== Sources ==
- Collins, John J. (2014). Introduction to the Hebrew Scriptures. Fortress Press. ISBN 978-1451469233.
- Dines, Jennifer M. (2007). "29. Amos". In Barton, John; Muddiman, John (eds.). The Oxford Bible Commentary (first (paperback) ed.). Oxford University Press. pp. 581–590. ISBN 978-0199277186.
- Fitzmyer, Joseph A. (2008). A Guide to the Dead Sea Scrolls and Related Literature. Grand Rapids, MI: William B. Eerdmans Publishing Company. ISBN 978-0802862419.
- Hayes, Christine (2015). Introduction to the Bible. Yale University Press. ISBN 978-0300188271.
- Ulrich, Eugene, ed. (2010). The Biblical Qumran Scrolls: Transcriptions and Textual Variants. Brill.
- Würthwein, Ernst (1995). The Text of the Old Testament. Translated by Rhodes, Erroll F. Grand Rapids, MI: Wm. B. Eerdmans. ISBN 0-8028-0788-7.
