= Papyrus Oxyrhynchus 846 =

Greek manuscript fragment of the Septuagint

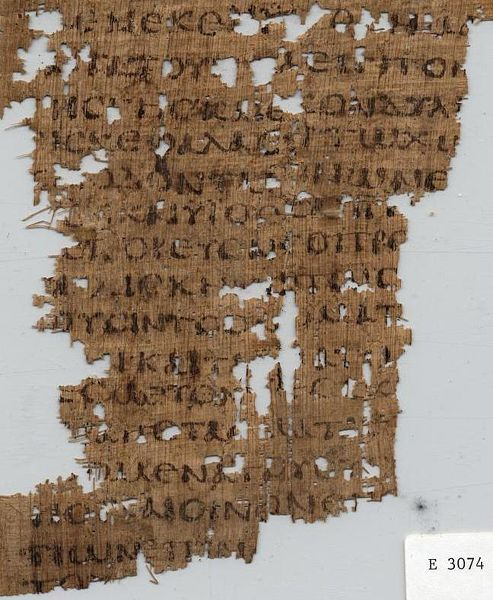
POxy VI 846: Amos 2 (LXX)

Papyrus Oxyrhynchus 846 (P. Oxy. 846 or E 3074) is a 6th-century manuscript of a portion of the Greek version of the Hebrew Bible (Tanakh or Old Testament) known as the Septuagint. It is one of the manuscripts discovered in Oxyrhynchus, was cataloged under the number 846. Palaeographically dates back to the sixth century CE. It contains Amos 2:6-12. It has been numbered as 906 in the list of Septuagint manuscripts according to classification by Alfreda Rahlfs.

The fragment was published in 1908 by Bernard P. Grenfell and Artur S. Hunt in The Oxyrhynchus Papyri, vol. VI. It is now in the University of Pennsylvania, catalogued as E 3074.

== See also ==
- Amos 2
- Oxyrhynchus Papyri
- Papyrus Oxyrhynchus 847
