= Francis Gigot =

French Catholic priest and Sulpician

Francis Ernest Charles Gigot (French: [fʁɑ̃sis ʒiɡo]; 1859– June 14, 1920) was a French Catholic priest and Sulpician who published many religious books.

== Biography ==
Born in Indre, France in 1859, Gigot was educated at the seminary in Limoges before attending the Institut Catholique de Paris, where he was a student of the liberal Alfred Loisy. He was ordained in 1883.

Gigot immigrated to America and taught Scripture at St. John's Seminary, Brighton, Massachusetts (1885–1899), where he was mentor to the Paulist James Martin Gillis, then St. Mary's Seminary, Baltimore and to St. Austin’s College in Washington, D.C.(1899–1904), then St. Joseph's Seminary, Dunwoodie (1904–1920).

A respected Scripture scholar, he contributed articles to the Catholic Encyclopedia, the American Ecclesiastical Review, the Irish Theological Quarterly, and the New York Review.

Gigot held revisionist views of Scripture and the Sulpician leadership in Paris wanted Rector Father James Francis Driscoll to rein Gigot in. Driscoll and Gigot "chafed against the scholasticism which they refused to see as exhaustive of orthodoxy". Gigot and the others left the Sulpicians to join the Archdiocese of New York.

He was a member of the American Oriental Society and the New York Oriental Club.

Gigot died at St. Vincent's Hospital, Manhattan in 1920.

== Works ==
- General introduction to the study of the Holy Scriptures. Abridged ed. By Rev. Francis E. Gigot New York Cincinnati [etc.] Benziger brothers. 1900, 1904.
- Outlines of Jewish History, Benziger brothers. 1918
- A Primer of Old Testament History, The Paulist Press. 1919
