= Graded numerical sequence =

A graded numerical sequence or numerical proverb, sometimes called an n/n+1 saying or numerical heightening, is a literary form employed in the Hebrew Bible. It is found especially in Proverbs, Job, and Amos, and is used to list attributes, compare items, and catalogue sins. 38 biblical examples have been identified, as well as in the Book of Sirach. Franz Delitzsch notes "this peculiarity: ... that the number named in the first parallel line is in the second increased by one".

== Examples ==
There are six things which the Lord hates,
Yes, seven which are an abomination to Him:
Haughty eyes, a lying tongue,
And hands that shed innocent blood,
A heart that devises wicked plans,
Feet that run rapidly to evil,
A false witness who utters lies,

And one who spreads strife among brothers.

— Proverbs 6:16-19 (NASB)

There are three things which are too wonderful for me,
Four which I do not understand:
The way of an eagle in the sky,
The way of a serpent on a rock,
The way of a ship in the middle of the sea,

And the way of a man with a maid.

— Proverbs 30:18-19 (NASB)

Thus says the Lord,

"For three transgressions of Judah and for four
I will not revoke its punishment,
Because they rejected the law of the Lord
And have not kept His statutes;
Their lies also have led them astray,
Those after which their fathers walked.
"So I will send fire upon Judah

And it will consume the citadels of Jerusalem."

— Amos 2:4-5 (NASB)

== Use and meaning ==
This form is used in Ugaritic literature, but not in Ancient Egyptian literature.

The name מדּה was used for numerical proverbs by later Jewish writers.

Graeme Goldsworthy suggests that this formula "points to the open-ended nature of the list, thus inviting the perceptive person to supply further items". Wilfred Watson notes that the graded numerical sequence is sometimes used for climactic effect, as in Proverbs 30:19.
