= Bethel =

Ancient Israelite city mentioned in the Bible

Coordinates: 31.9226°N 35.245°E

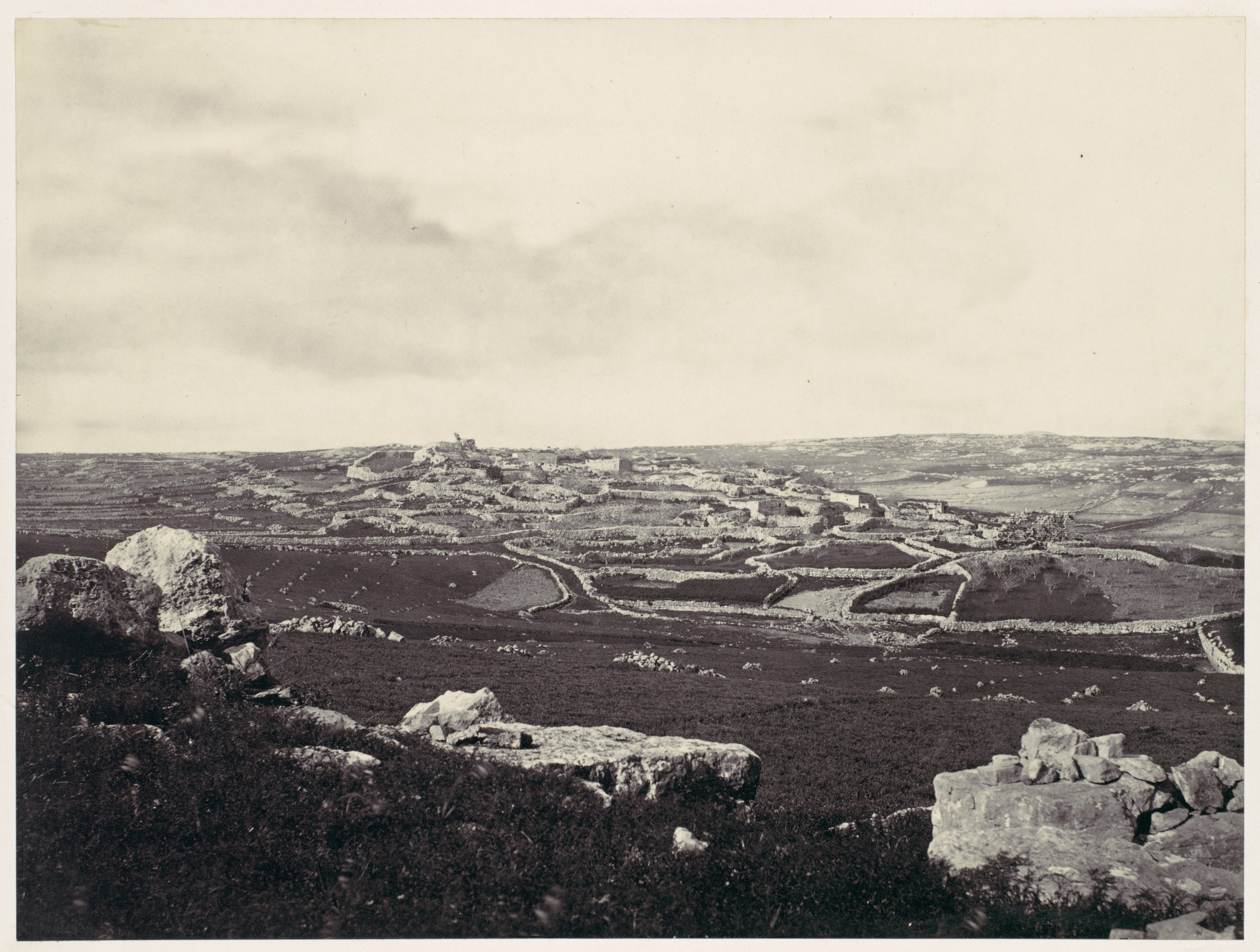
The ruins of Beitin, the site of ancient Bethel, during the 19th century

Bethel (Hebrew: בֵּית־אֵל, romanized: Bēṯ ʾĒl, "House of El" or "House of God", also transliterated Beth El, Beth-El, Beit El; Greek: Βαιθήλ; Latin: Bethel) was an ancient Israelite city and sacred space that is frequently mentioned in the Hebrew Bible.

Bethel is first referred to in the Bible as being near the place where Abram pitched his tent. Later, Bethel is mentioned as the location of Jacob's Ladder that Jacob named Bethel "House of God". The name is further used for a border city located between the territory of the tribe of Benjamin and that of the tribe of Ephraim, which first belonged to the Benjaminites and was later conquered by the Ephraimites. In the 4th century, Eusebius and Jerome described Bethel as a small village that lay 12 Roman miles north of Jerusalem to the right or the east of the road leading to Neapolis.

Most scholars identify Bethel with the modern-day village of Beitin, located in the West Bank, 5 kilometers (3.1 mi) northeast of Ramallah. After the fall of the Crusader kingdom, Bethel was left in ruins under the rule of Saladin, remaining uninhabited for centuries until the mid-19th century when modern-day Beitin was established. In 1977, the biblical name was applied to the Israeli settlement of Beit El, founded nearby. In several countries, particularly the United States, the name has been given to various locations (see Bethel (disambiguation)).

== Identification ==
Bethel is widely identified by most scholars with the modern Arab village of Beitin, situated in the central part of the West Bank.

Among the earliest proponents of this identification was biblical scholar and traveler Edward Robinson, in his work Biblical Researches in Palestine (1838–1852). Robinson based this assessment on the location described in ancient texts, and on the philological similarities between the modern and ancient name, arguing that the replacement of the Hebrew el with the Arabic in was not unusual. This viewpoint was later reaffirmed by another early scholar, Henry Baker Tristram. The final 'l' in the name "Bethel" endured until the Crusader period. The name "Beitin," with the /n/ ending, was not documented until the 19th century, possibly coming into use after the Early Middle Ages.

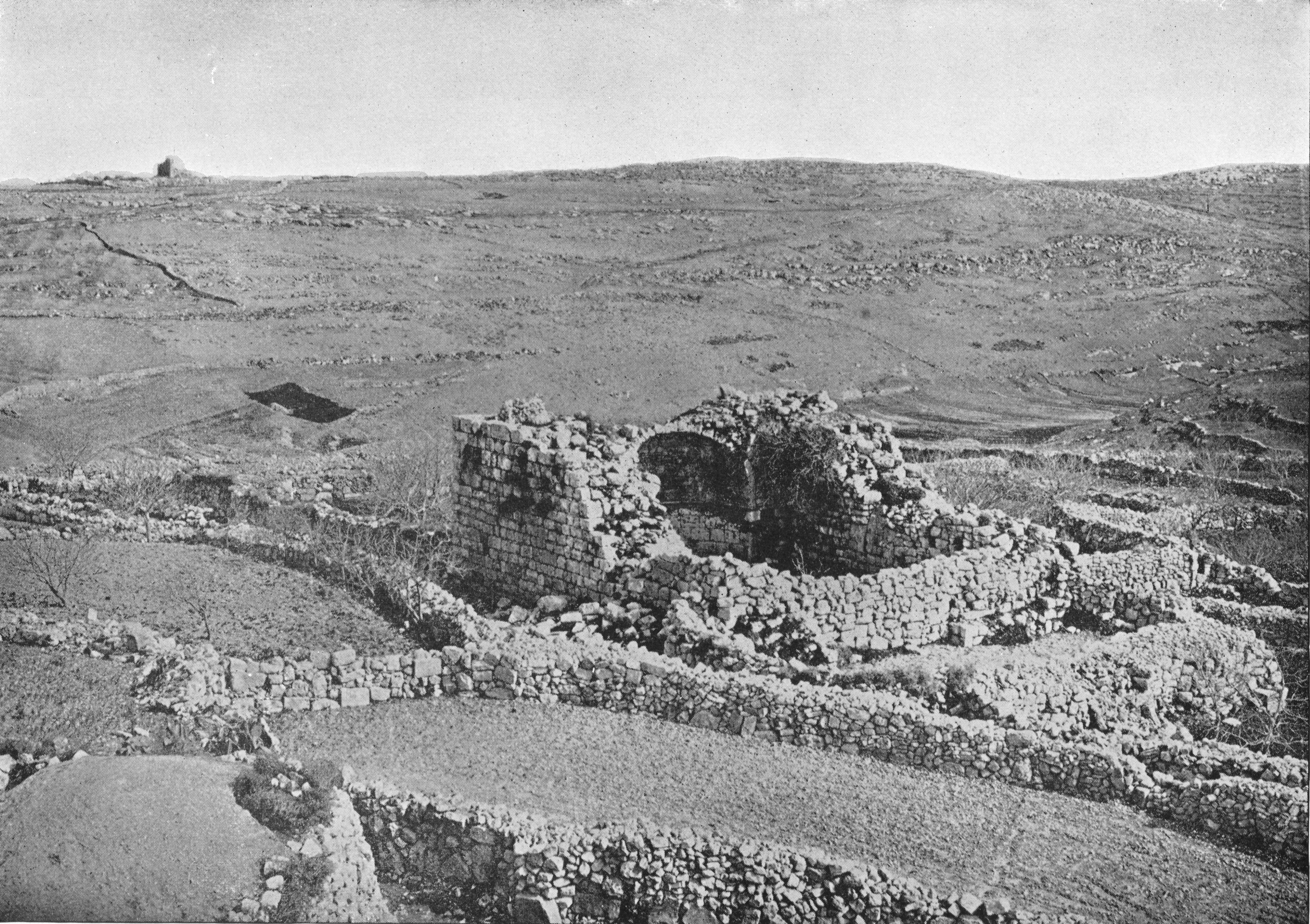
Beitin in 1894, from the book Holy Land photographed by Daniel B. Shepp

A minority view was proposed by David Palmer Livingston and John J. Bimson, who proposed an alternative identification, suggesting that Bethel might be equated with al-Bireh, while positing Beitin as biblical Ophrah. However, Ophrah is commonly identified with the nearby village of Taybeh. These proposals have been rejected by Jules Francis Gomes, who wrote that "The voices of Livingston and Bimson have hardly been taken seriously by those who worked on the excavations of Bethel."

== Biblical references ==
=== Book of Genesis ===
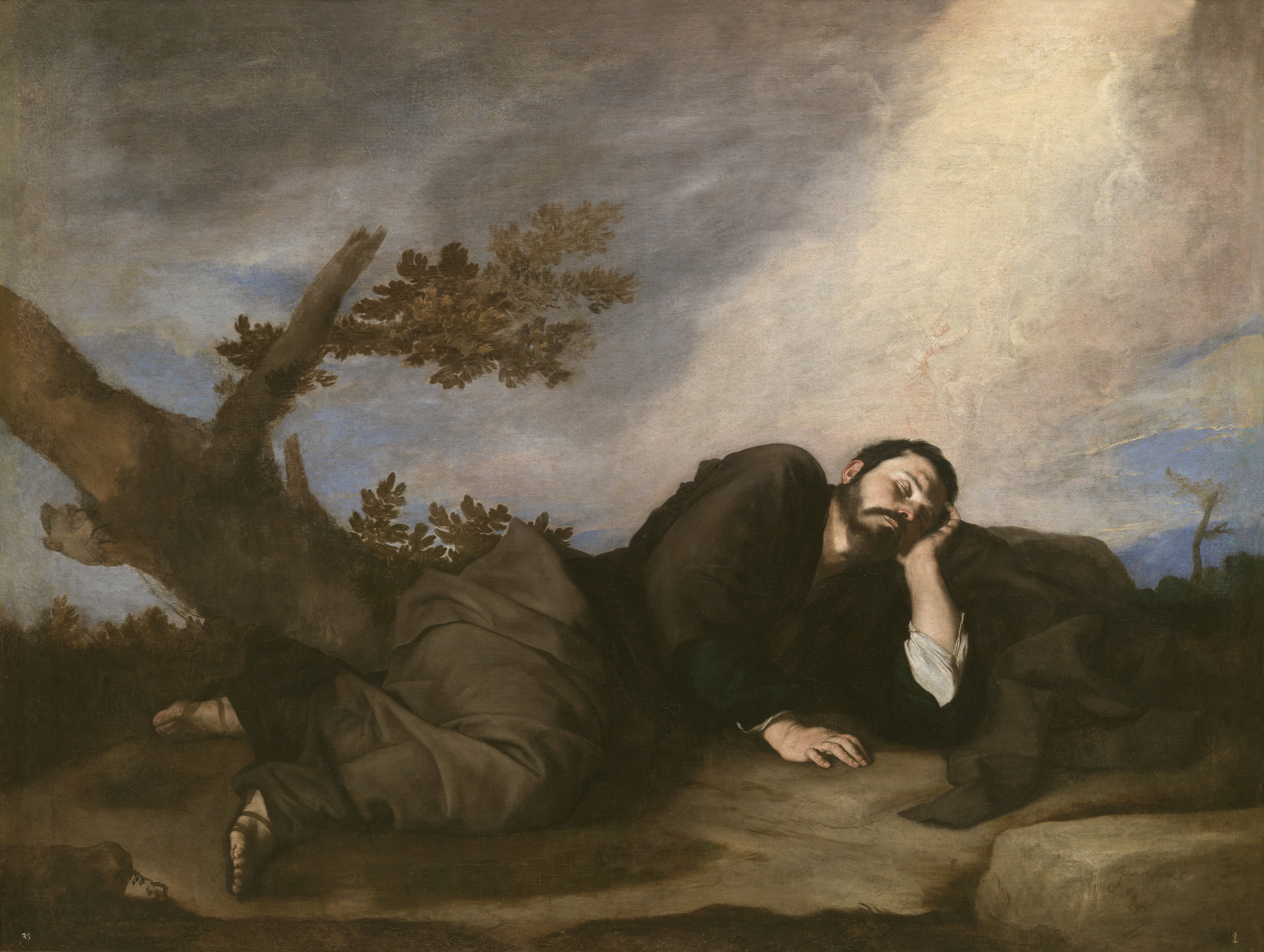
Depiction of Jacob's dream at Bethel, by Jusepe de Ribera.

Bethel is mentioned several times in the Book of Genesis. It is first mentioned in Lech-Lecha (Genesis 12 and 13) as a place near the place where Abram stayed and built an altar on his way to Egypt and on his return. It is said to be close to Ai and just to the west of it. More famously, it is mentioned again in Genesis 28, when Jacob, fleeing from the wrath of his brother Esau, falls asleep on a stone and dreams of a ladder stretching between Heaven and Earth and thronged with angels; God stands at the top of the ladder, and promises Jacob the land of Canaan; when Jacob awakes he anoints the stone (baetyl) with oil and names the place Bethel.

Jacob recalls the place, the presence of God there, the anointing of the stone and his own vow to God in Genesis 31:13.

Another account, in Genesis 35 repeats the covenant with God and the naming of the place as El-Bethel, and makes this the site of Jacob's own change of name to Israel. Both versions state that the original name of the place was Luz, a Canaanite name.

=== Book of Joshua ===
Bethel is mentioned again in the book of Joshua 7:2, 8:9 as being close to Ai and on the west side of it; in this episode Joshua sent men from Jericho to capture Ai. At 16:1 it is again said to be next to Luz, near Jericho, and part of the territory of the descendants of Joseph (that is Manasseh and Ephraim, cf. Joshua 16:4).

=== Book of Judges ===
In the book of Judges 1:22 the descendants of Joseph capture the city of Bethel, which again is said to have previously been called Luz. At Judges 4:5 the prophetess Deborah is said to dwell at Bethel under the palm-tree of Deborah (presumably a reference to Genesis 35:8, where another Deborah, the nurse of Jacob's mother Rebecca, is said to have been buried under a tree at Bethel). Bethel is said in Judges 4:5 to be in Mount Ephraim.

In the narrative of Levite's concubine, in Judges 20:18, where the Hebrew Beth-El is translated in the King James Version as the "House of God", the people of Israel go to Bethel to ask counsel of God when they are planning to attack the Tribe of Benjamin at the battle of Gibeah. They make a second visit (Judges 20:26) after losing the battle.

Bethel was evidently already an important religious centre at this time; it was so important, in fact, that the Ark of the Covenant was kept there, under the care of Phinehas the grandson of Aaron (Judges 20:27 f). At Judges 21:19, Bethel is said to be south of Shiloh.

=== Book of Samuel ===
At the next mention of the Ark, in 1 Samuel 4:3, it is said to be kept at Shiloh.

In the book 1 Samuel 7:16, it is said that the prophet Samuel, who resided at Ramah, used to make a yearly circuit of Bethel, Gilgal and Mizpah to judge Israel. At I Samuel 10:3, Samuel tells Saul to go to Bethel to visit the 'Hill of God,' where he will meet a group of prophets coming down from the high place with a 'psaltery, and a tabret, and a pipe, and a harp.' It appears that there was a Philistine garrison there at that time. Bethel is mentioned again in 1 Samuel 13:2 and 1 Samuel 30:27.

=== First Book of Kings ===
After the kingdom of Israel was split into two kingdoms on the death of King Solomon (c.931 BC), Jeroboam, the first king of the northern Kingdom of Israel, made two golden calves (1 Kings 12:28 ff) and set one up in Bethel, and the other in Dan in the far north of his kingdom. This was apparently to make it unnecessary for the people of Israel to have to go to Jerusalem to worship in the temple there. It seems that this action provoked the hostility of the Judaeans. A story is told at 1 Kings 13:1 ff of how a man from Judah visited the shrine at Bethel and prophesied that it would eventually be destroyed by Josiah.

=== Second Book of Kings ===
According to 2 Kings 2:1ff, the prophets Elijah and Elisha visited Bethel on a journey from Gilgal to Jericho shortly before Elijah was taken up to heaven alive (2 Kings 2:11). Later, when Elisha returned alone to Bethel, he was taunted by some young boys as he climbed up to the shrine, and cursed them; whereupon 42 of the young men were mauled by bears (2 Kings 2:23 ff).

Bethel is next mentioned in connection with the tenth king of Israel, Jehu (c. 842–815 BC). Despite his killing of the prophets of Baal and destruction of their temple, it is said that Jehu continued to tolerate the presence of the golden calves in Bethel and Dan (2 Kings 10:29). The shrine at Bethel apparently avoided destruction in the Assyrian invasions of the Kingdom of Israel in c. 740 and 722, but was finally completely destroyed by King Josiah of Judah (c. 640–609 BC).

=== Books of Amos, Hosea and Jeremiah ===
The shrine is mentioned with disapproval by the prophet Amos (c. 750):

Do not seek Bethel, do not go to Gilgal, do not journey to Beersheba. For Gilgal will surely go into exile, and Bethel will be reduced to nothing.

— Amos, 5:5

Amaziah, a priest of Bethel, expels Amos from the shrine:

Don’t prophesy anymore at Bethel, because this is the king’s sanctuary and the temple of the kingdom.

— Amos, 7:13

A few years later, the prophet Hosea (8th century BC) speaks (at least according to modern translations) of the "wickedness" of Bethel (Hosea 10:15) and Jeremiah (6th century BC) speaks of the "shame" which it brought on Israel (Jeremiah 48:13). Hosea 13:1–3 describes how the Israelites are abandoning Adonai for the worship of Baal, and accuses them of making or using images for 'idol' worship. Chief among these, it appears, was the image of the bull at Bethel, which by the time of Hosea was being worshipped as an image of Baal.

=== Books of Ezra and Nehemiah ===
Bethel is mentioned in Ezra 2:28 and Nehemiah 7:32 as being resettled at the time of the return of the exiles from Babylon.

== History and archaeology ==
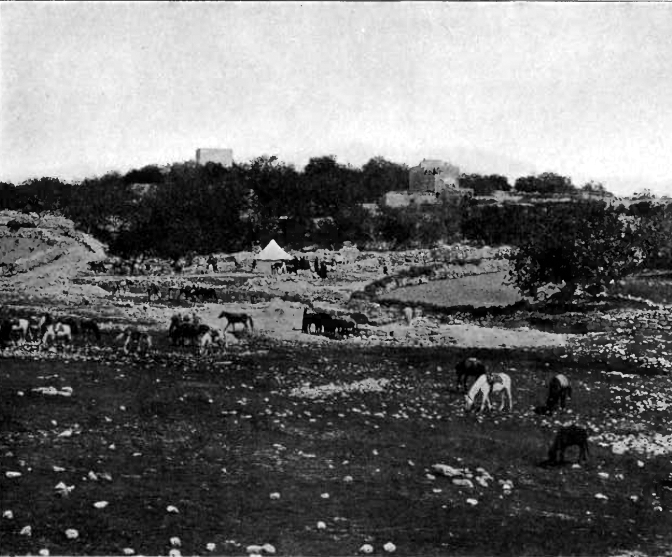
Bethel, 1912

William F. Albright first excavated a test pit in Bethel in 1927, while extensive excavations were conducted at Beitin by Albright and James L. Kelso in 1934, which continued under the direction of Kelso in 1937, 1954, 1957, and 1960.

During his excavation campaigns, James Kelso found a clay stamp in contextually challenging debris near a Middle Bronze Age wall on the site's south-west side in 1957. Intriguingly, this find bore a striking resemblance to one Theodore Bent brought back from al-Mašhad Wādī Dawʿan (Hadhramaut, Yemen) in 1894. Indeed, such was the similarity, some scholars considered that the Bethel stamp was actually the Bent find and that the latter's wife, Mabel Bent, had somehow, and for some reason, deposited the object there after her husband's untimely death in 1897. Bizarrely, neither of the stamps (or the single one) have been traced for decades, and the only evidence that can be seen today is a squeeze made of the Bent stamp, which is now in the Eduard Glaser Collection, Vienna.

Recent excavations at Elevation Point 914, a prominent hill located 900 meters east of the village of Beitin, by Aharon Tavger have uncovered several Middle Bronze and Iron II remains which have led excavator at E.P. 914 to propose this place as the ancient cult site of Bethel, and perhaps the location of Abram's altar.

=== Chalcolithic period ===
Human settlement at the site of Beitin dates back to the Chalcolithic period. Archaeological excavations in 1950 uncovered flint tools, pottery and animal bones from that time.

=== Bronze Age ===
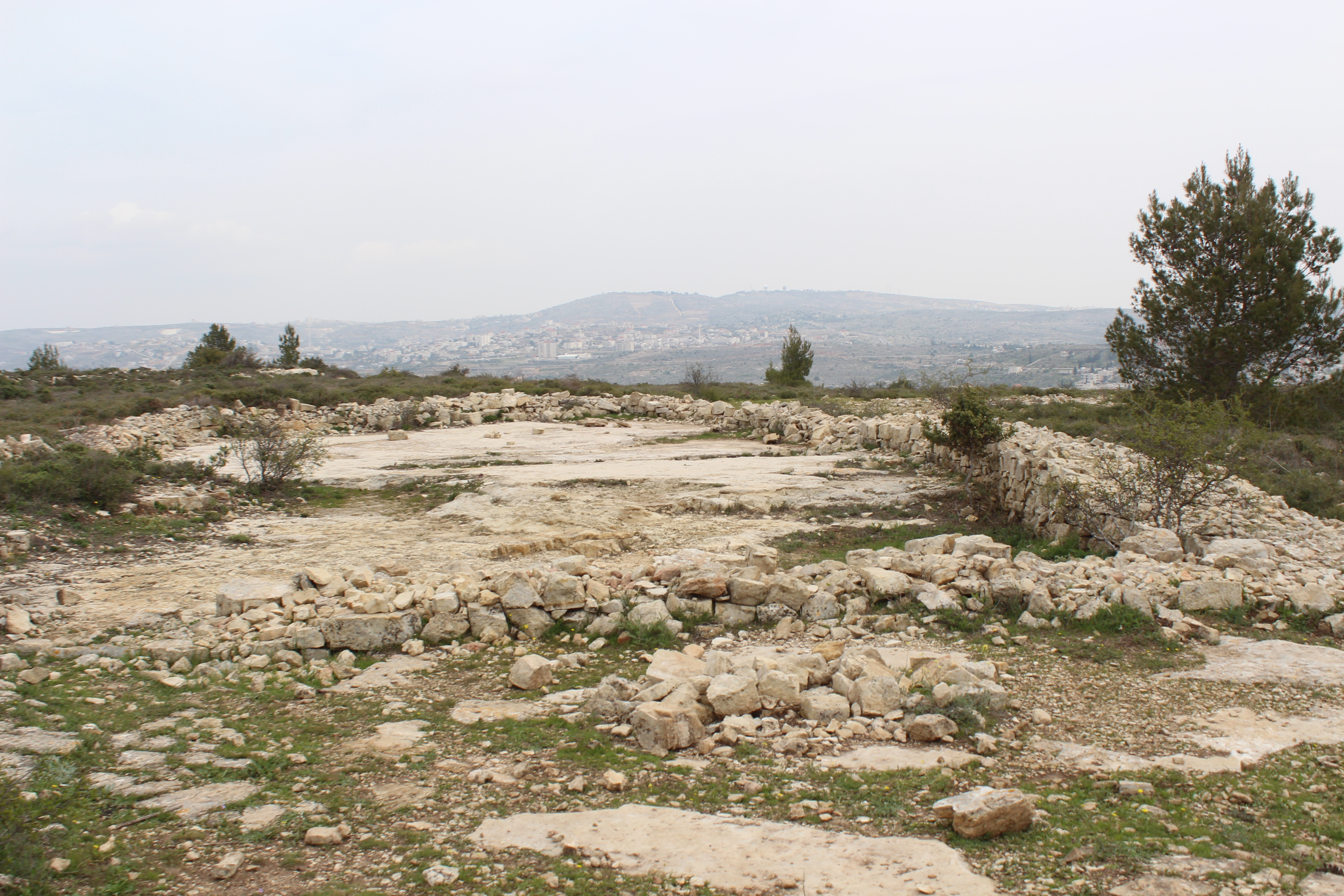
Early Bronze Age Canaanite ritual site, cut through the bamah by Middle Bronze Age II city wall. Tel Beit El, Beitin, 2017.

In the Early Bronze Age (around 3200 BCE) normally nomadic populations settled in the area. Canaanite tombs, houses and olive presses were discovered to the north and southeast of the village. The remains of a Canaanite temple were also excavated by archaeologists.

In the Middle Bronze Age (around 1750 BCE) its status was elevated from a village to a fortified Canaanite town which is believed to be biblical Luz. Two city gates dating to this period have been excavated, one in the northeast and the other northwest of the wall. A second temple was built in Luz during this period, but was destroyed as a result of an earthquake.

The Late Bronze Age city at Bethel was destroyed at some point during the late 13th or early 12th century BCE.

=== Iron Age ===
During the Early Iron Age, a newer settlement was established. This settlement was continuously inhabited during the early and later phases of the Iron Age, although the exact date of its destruction remains uncertain.

=== Hellenistic, Roman, Byzantine and medieval periods ===
Bethel/Beitin was again inhabited and fortified by Bacchides the Syrian in the time of the Maccabees.

During the Great Jewish Revolt, Vespasian captured Bethel in the summer of 69 CE.

Robinson notes that after the writings of Eusebius and Jerome, he found no further references to Bethel in the written historical record. However, he notes that the ruins at Beitin are greater than those of a village and seem to have undergone expansion after the time of Jerome, noting also the presence of what appear to be ruins of churches from the Middle Ages. The town appears on the 6th century Madaba Map as Louza (Ancient Greek: Λουζα), also known as Bethel (Βεθηλ, Bethēl)".

=== Early Muslim period ===
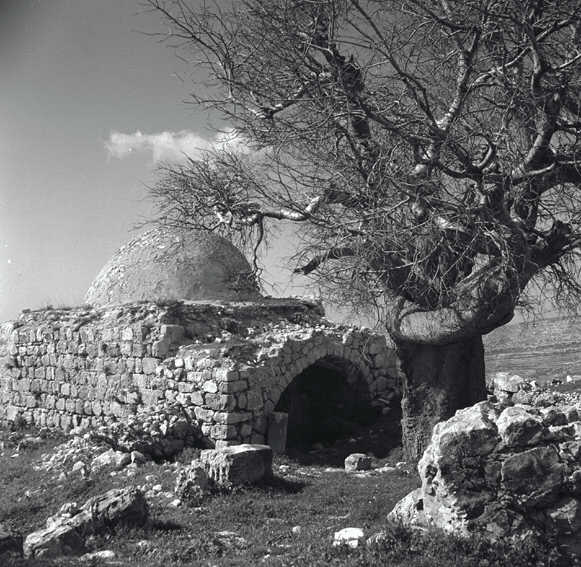
A domed structure in Bethel, 1945

The church fell into ruin after the Islamic Rashidun army conquered the area.

=== Crusader and Ayyubid periods ===
The church was rebuilt by the Crusaders in the 12th century. During the Crusader period, the village was given as fief by Baldwin V of Jerusalem to the Church of the Holy Sepulchre. After the Crusaders were defeated by the Ayyubid forces of Saladin in 1187, the church was destroyed and the village was abandoned.

== See also ==
- Bayt-Allah, another name for the Kaaba in Mecca
- Bethel (god), name of a god or an aspect of a god from the Assyrian to Hellenistic periods
- Allon Bachuth

== Bibliography ==
- Bleeker, C. J.; Widengren, G. (1988), Historia Religionum: Handbook for the History of Religions, BRILL, ISBN 978-90-04-08928-0
- Encyclopædia Britannica 2007 Ultimate Reference Suite
- Gomes, Jules Francis (2006), The Sanctuary of Bethel and the Configuration of Israelite Identity, Walter de Gruyter & Co, ISBN 978-3-11-018993-3
- Kelso, James Leon; Swauger, James L. (1968). The excavation of Bethel (1934-1960). American Schools of Oriental Research.
- Robinson, Edward; Smith, Eli (1856), Biblical Researches in Palestine, 1838–52: A Journal of Travels in the Year 1838, University of Michigan
