= Amos (prophet) =

Hebrew prophet

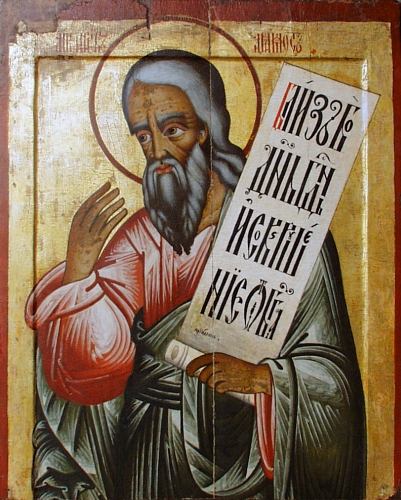
- The prophet Amos, 18th century Russian Orthodox icon.

Prophet
- Born: Tekoa
- Died: 745 BCE
- Venerated in: Judaism; Christianity; Islam
- Feast: June 15 (Eastern Orthodox)
- Major works: Book of Amos

Amos (/ˈeɪməs/; Hebrew: עָמוֹס – ʿĀmōs) was one of the Twelve Minor Prophets of the Hebrew Bible and Christian Old Testament. According to the Bible, Amos was the older contemporary of Hosea and Isaiah and was active c. 760–755 BC during the rule of kings Jeroboam II of Israel and Uzziah of the Kingdom of Judah and is portrayed as being from the southern Kingdom of Judah yet preaching in the northern Kingdom of Israel (Samaria). The prophet is characterized as speaking against an increased disparity between the wealthy and the poor with themes of justice, God's omnipotence, and divine judgment. The Book of Amos is attributed to him. In recent years, scholars have grown more skeptical of the Book of Amos's presentation of Amos's biography and background.

== Life ==
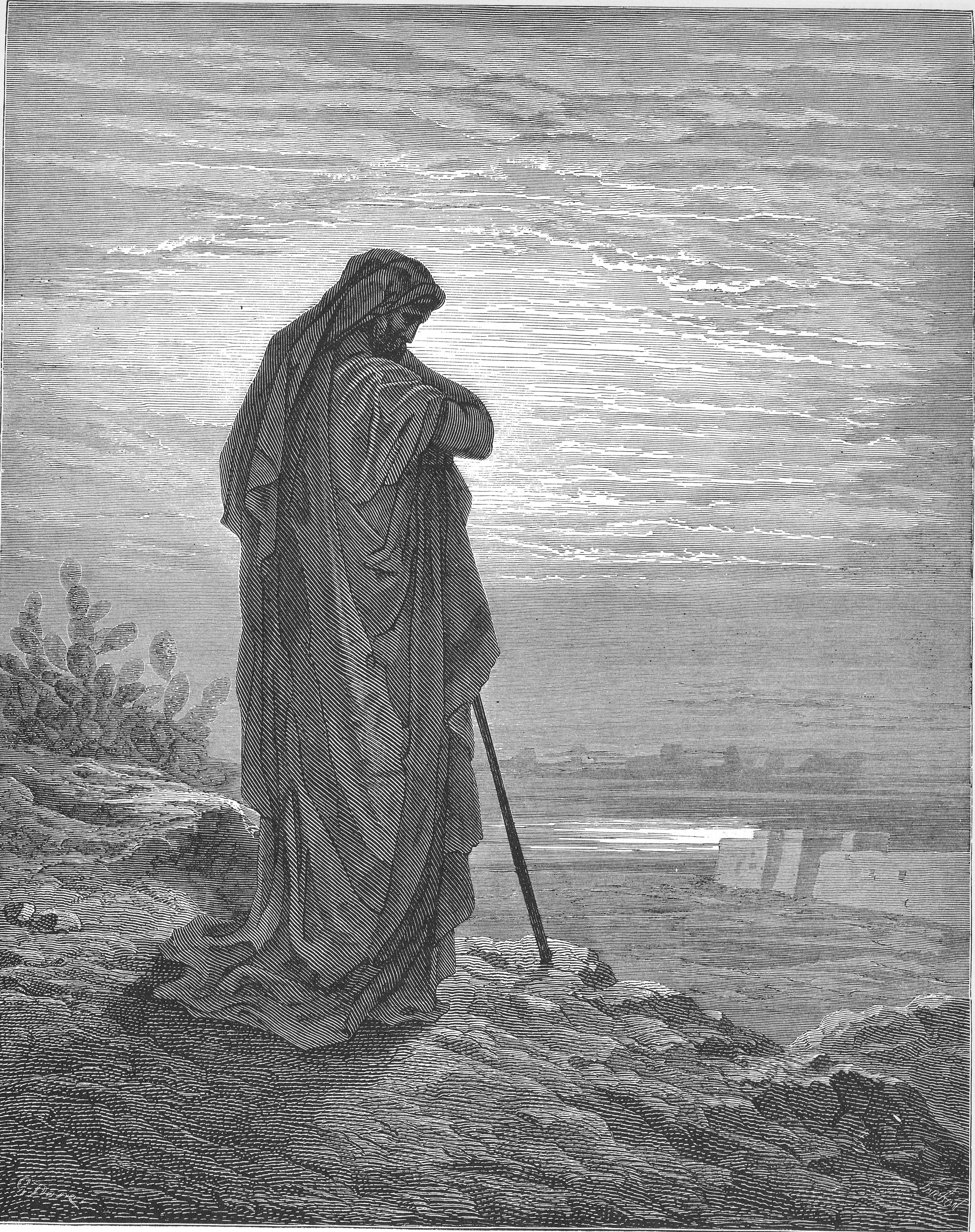
Prophet Amos as depicted by Gustave Doré (1866)

Before becoming a prophet, Amos was a shepherd and a sycamore fig farmer from Teqoaʿ. Amos aimed his prophetic message at the northern kingdom of Israel, particularly the cities of Samaria and Bethel. Teqoaʿ is often identified with Teqoaʿ south of Jerusalem, but Gary Rendsburg notes that the Teqoaʿ in question was in Galilee in the Kingdom of Samaria.

Amos's prior professions and his claim "I am not a prophet nor a son of a prophet" (7:14) indicates that Amos was not from the school of prophets, which Amos claims would qualify him as a true prophet. Amos's declaration marks a turning point in the development of Biblical prophecy. It is not mere chance that Hosea, Isaiah, Jeremiah, Ezekiel, and almost all of the prophets given significant coverage in the Hebrew Bible give first of all the story of their special calling. All of them seek to protest against the suspicion that they are professional prophets because the latter discredited themselves by flattering national vanities and ignoring the misdeeds of prominent men.

The Bible speaks of his prophecies concluding around 765 BC, two years before the earthquake that is talked about in Amos 1:1, "...two years before the earthquake." The prophet Zechariah was likely alluding to this same earthquake several centuries later: Zechariah 14:5, "And you shall flee as you fled from the earthquake in the days of Uzziah, King of Judah."

Jeroboam II (c. 781–741 BC), the ruler of Israel/Samaria, had rapidly conquered Syria, Moab, and Ammon, and thereby extended his dominions from the source of the Orontes River on the north to the Dead Sea on the south. The northern empire had enjoyed a long period of peace and security marked by a revival of artistic and commercial development. Social corruption and the oppression of the poor and helpless were prevalent. Others, carried away by the free association with heathen peoples, which resulted from conquest or commercial contact, went so far as to fuse with the Lord's worship, that of pagan deities.

Amos is widely recognised as the first of the prophets to write down all the messages he received. Many have admired his language and diction and view him as Isaiah's spiritual progenitor. What we know of Amos derives solely from the book that he authored.

Amos felt called to preach in Bethel, where there was a royal sanctuary (7:13), and there to announce the fall of the reigning dynasty and the northern kingdom. But he is denounced by the head priest Amaziah to King Jeroboam II and is advised to leave the kingdom. There is no reason to doubt that he was forced to leave the northern kingdom and return to his native country. Prevented from bringing his message to an end and from reaching the ears of those to whom he was sent, he wrote instead. If they could not hear his messages, they could read them, and if his contemporaries refused to do so, following generations might still profit from them. No earlier instance of a literary prophet is known; most others followed his example. It cannot be proved that Hosea knew the book of Amos, though there is no reason to doubt that he was acquainted with the latter's work and experiences. It is certain that Isaiah knew his book, for he follows and even imitates him in his early speeches (compare Amos 5:21–24, 4:6ff, 5:18 with Isaiah 1:11–15; Amos 4:7ff with Isaiah 9:7ff, 3:12). Cheyne concludes that Amos wrote the record of his prophetical work at Jerusalem after his expulsion from the northern kingdom and that he committed it to a circle of faithful followers residing there.

The apocryphal work The Lives of the Prophets records that Amos was killed by the son of Amaziah, priest of the temple of Bethel. It further states that Amos had returned to his homeland before he died and was buried there.

== Themes ==
=== God's omnipotence and divine judgment ===
- No modern interpreter has denied that he taught that God is ethical to the extent that he cannot be affected by ceremonies as such. "For Amos ... religion consists not in ritual but in righteousness. YHWH, God of justice, demands right living not oblations."
- "Amos thus proclaimed an ethical God so clearly that only ethical relations between men could assure divine favor; and nothing in his words indicates that he recognized any other approach to God. Such an approach naturally involves worship – a term that includes the whole process of man's communion with his God; even in ancient Israel worship was never confined to sacrifices and offerings, as witness Jacob at Bethel, Moses before the burning bush, Elijah on Mt. Horeb. Man also has never failed to devise new forms of approach to God to accord with his changed conceptions of Deity."

== Teachings ==
Some of his main teachings are:

- Prayers and sacrifices do not make up for bad deeds. "Practice of religious acts is no insurance against the judgment of God" and that "privilege involves opportunity, or escap-ism... Immunity cannot be claimed simply because of past favor of God, irrespective of deeds and the measure of faithful service."
- Behaving justly is much more important than ritual (Amos 5:21–24). "Ceremonial worship has no intrinsic value...the only genuine service of God consists in justice and righteousness (5:24)".
- Amos believed in economic justice, "the conviction of Amos that economic justice was necessary to preserve the nation (whereas his opponents asserted that sacrifices and offerings were preserving it) forced him to conclude that a God who wanted the nation preserved must want justice and want it always, and could never therefore want sacrifices, which abetted and condoned injustice."
- "Amos was an uncompromising monotheist. There is not a verse in his writing that admits the existence of other deities."
- The relationship between the people of Israel is articulated as a moral contract. If the people of Israel fall below God's moral requirements, then their relationship will certainly be dissolved.
- Dependence on God is a requisite for fulfillment. One will live if he seeks the Lord (Amos 5:4).

== Justice ==
Ancient interpretations

The ancient appeal towards justice is expressed by the voice of God in Amos's teachings. God tells Amos that the Israelites are going to face divine intervention as oppression is running rampant in Israel. God expressed this oppression by saying that the Israelites were practicing religiosity without righteousness. By oppressing the poor and failing to practice justice the Israelites were behaving unrighteously; justice was to be enacted as a core of God's message in Amos's prophetic teachings.

Modern interpretations

Influences of or references to Amos's teachings can be found in certain modern political and civil rights speeches. In Martin Luther King Jr.'s "I Have a Dream", King states, "we will not be satisfied until justice rolls down like waters and righteousness like a mighty stream", which is an allusion to Amos 5:24: "But let justice roll on like a river, righteousness like a never-failing stream!". Bernie Sanders also referenced Amos 5:24 in a speech during his 2016 presidential campaign. It was used in a sub-tweet by James Comey after Michael Flynn pleaded guilty to lying to FBI agents during the ongoing Trump Russia scandal.

== Feast days/religious veneration ==
Within Roman, Byzantine, and other high liturgical churches saints are regularly celebrated and venerated on Feast days throughout the calendar year. This practice honors Christian martyrs on the traditional day of their death with facts about their life and insights attributed to them meant to edify the faithful.

In the Eastern Orthodox liturgical calendar, Amos's feast day is celebrated on June 15 (for those churches which follow the traditional Julian Calendar, June 15 currently falls on June 28 of the modern Gregorian Calendar). In the Byzantine churches the troparion of Amos is sung:

"Celebrating the memory / Of Your Prophet Amos, O Lord, / For his sake, we entreat You, save our souls."

Reflecting Amos's sense of urgency and social justice, the kontakion of Amos is sung:

"Purifying your fervent heart by the Spirit, / O glorious Prophet Amos, / And receiving the gift of prophecy from on high, / You cry with a loud voice to the nations: / This is our God, and there is none beside Him."

He is commemorated along with the other minor prophets in the Calendar of Saints of the Armenian Apostolic Church on July 31.

In the Roman Catholic tradition Amos's day is celebrated on March 31.

== In Islam ==
In Islamic tradition, Āmūs ibn Īshiyā (Arabic: عاموص بن إشعيا ) is acknowledged as one of the prophets sent to Bani Israil after al Yasa (Elisha). He is not mentioned in the Quran or the Hadith. He is purely known from Israʼiliyyat sources.
