= Genesis 31 =

Genesis 31 may refer to:

- Vayetze, the Jewish parashah which covers this chapter from the Book of Genesis
- Jacob's flight from Laban, recounted in this chapter.
