= Crosby–Schøyen Codex MS 193 =

Bodmer Papyri Codex - oldest complete Book of Jonah text

Crosby–Schøyen Codex
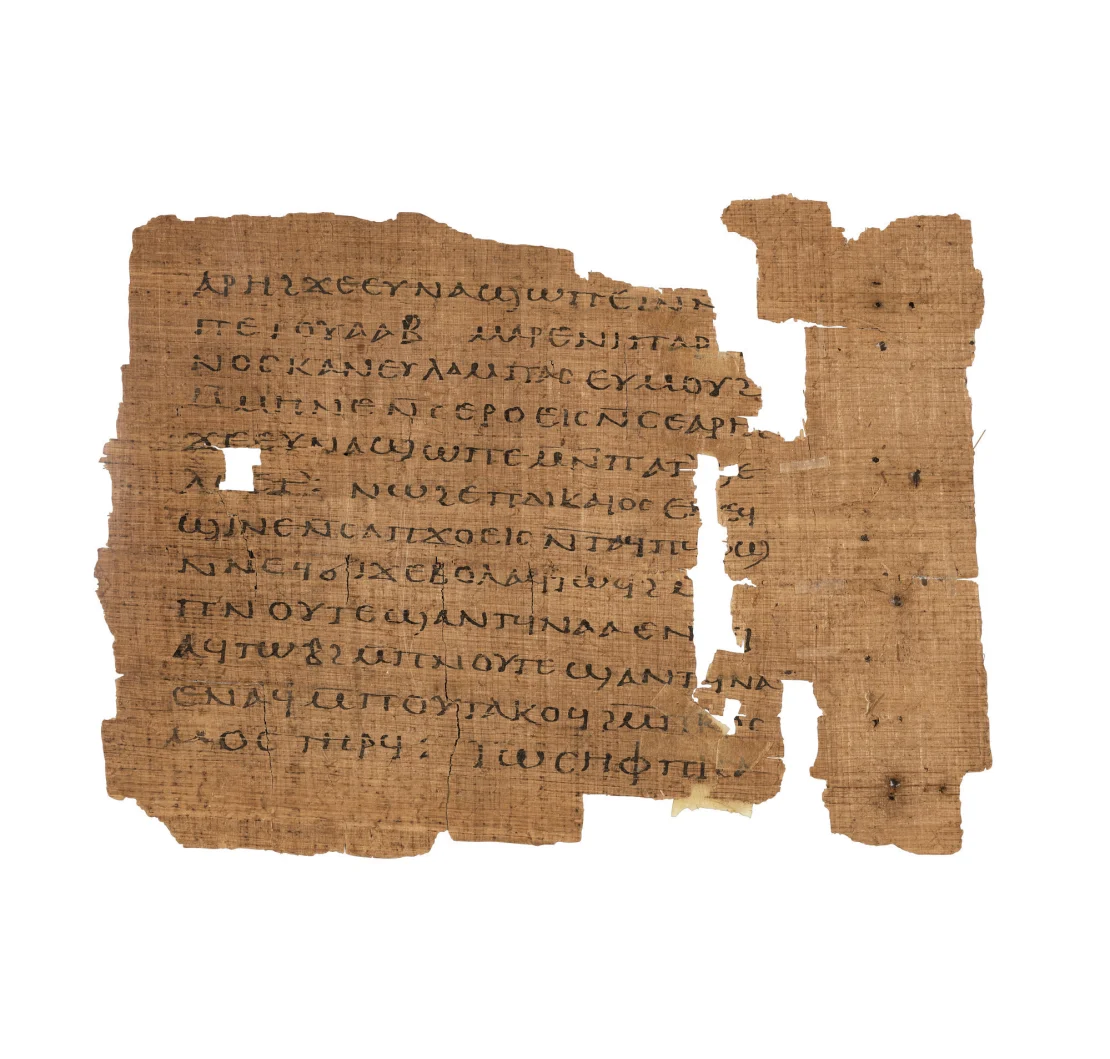
- Type: Codex
- Material: Papyrus
- Height: 15.2 cm (6.0 in)
- Width: 14.7 cm (5.8 in)
- Writing: Coptic script
- Period/culture: Roman Egypt c. 250-350 AD
- Discovered: 1952; Dishna, Egypt
- Present location: Museum of the Bible, Washington D.C.
- https://www.schoyencollection.com/bible-collection-foreword/coptic-bible/crosby-schoyen-codex-ms-193

The Crosby–Schøyen Codex (MS 193; also known as the Crosby Codex, Mississippi Coptic Codex I, or the Savery Codex) is a 3rd-century AD ancient Egyptian biblical manuscript written in Coptic on papyrus. Created in Alexandria, the codex consists of 104 pages (52 leaves), and contains the earliest surviving whole copies of the Book of Jonah and 1 Peter, as well as containing Peri Pascha, part of 2 Maccabees (5:27 to 7:41), and an Easter homily. It is considered an early example of the transition from scroll to codex.

The Crosby–Schøyen Codex is part of a corpus of papyri known as the Bodmer Papyri, and was previously held by the University of Mississippi, followed by the Schøyen Collection of Martin Schøyen of Oslo. The codex was sold during the Schøyen Collection Auction by Christie's on 11 June 2024.

== Discovery and provenance ==
The Codex, as part of the Bodmer Papyri, was discovered in 1952 at the base of a cliff of Jabal Abu Manna, 12 km (7.5 mi) east of the Nag Hammadi library buried in a jar in the sand. The corpus is also known as the Dishna papers.

It was owned by Hasan Muhammad al-Samman and Riyad Jirjis Fam, then Phocion J. Tano in 1952. It passed through the hands of Sultan Maguid Sameda before acquisition by the University of Mississippi in 1955 via donation by Lucius Olen and Margaret Reed Crosby (hence gaining the designation of Mississippi Coptic Codex I). UMiss possessed the codex til 1981, which then passed through Hans P. Kraus (1981–1983), Vinsor T. Savery (1983–1988), and then to Schøyen after an auction at Sotheby's on 12 June 1988.

The Codex was split in two in 1952, with 41 fragments from the beginning being acquired and catalogued by Martin Bodmer, until passing on to the holdings of Professor William H. Willis in 1967. They entered the collection of Duke University, catalogued as "P.Duk.inv.C125". In April 1990, it was acquired by Schøyen via exchange and the fragments reunited in June 1990.

It saw public exhibition from 3 June to 14 July 1996, in the exhibit Preservation for Access: Originals and Copies, held at the National Library of Norway in commemoration of the Memory of the World Programme by UNESCO.

The codex was sold in London by Christie's on 11 June 2024. Preserved in plexiglass and two lockable wooden boxes, the estimated selling price was between 2–3 million GBP (2.6–3.8 million USD), and the codex was finally sold for 3.065 million GBP (US$3.93 million).

The anonymous buyers of the codex revealed themselves as the Green Family, who acquired as part of the collection at the Museum of the Bible during an official announcement on 31 July 2025.

== Description ==
The codex measures 15.2 cm × 14.7 cm (6.0 in × 5.8 in), originally estimated to have a total of 136 pages, with dozens of the pages diminished through time, primarily at the beginning and end. Made of papyrus, it was composed of 35 sheets. The scribe wrote the text with a coarse pen, resulting in bold, large font. It is believed that the codex was primarily used as a lectionary. With radiocarbon dating, it is believed to be made in the 3rd century.

Written in Sahidic Coptic, it is believed to be written by a single scribe, and like other pieces of the Bodmer papyri, is part of a singular library containing a combination of Classical literature, Apocrypha, Biblical canon, math, and personal correspondences of the local monastery, the Pachomian Order.

The text along with the rest of the Bodmer corpus was buried by the monks in the 7th century during the establishment of the Rashidun Caliphate, where it lay in situ up until its discovery, its preservation attributed to the dry, arid climate of Upper Egypt.

Manuscript specialist for Christie's, Eugenio Donadoni describes the text as the "earliest witnesses to development in cultural and textual transmission" that "would not be rivalled in significance until Gutenberg's printing press" and that the "earliest monks in Upper Egypt, in the earliest Christian monastery were using this very book to celebrate the earliest Easter celebrations".

== See also ==
- Bible translations into Coptic
- Biblical manuscript
- Bodmer Library
