= Bodmer =

Bodmer is a German surname. Notable people with the surname include:

- Frederick Bodmer (1894–1960), Swiss philologist
- Johann Georg Bodmer (1786–1864), Swiss inventor
- Johann Jakob Bodmer (1698–1783), German-Swiss author and critic
- Julia Bodmer (1934–2001), British geneticist and trained economist
- Karl Bodmer (1809–1893), Swiss painter of the American West
- Martin Bodmer (1899–1971), Swiss purchaser of the Bodmer Papyri
- Mathieu Bodmer (born 1982), French footballer
- Paul Bodmer (1886–1983), Swiss painter
- Sir Walter Bodmer (born 1936), German-born British human geneticist

== See also ==
- Bodmer Library in Cologny, Switzerland, established by Martin Bodmer
- Bodmer Papyri, Egyptian papyri purchased by Martin Bodmer
- Bodmér, a village in Hungary
