= Uncial 0220 =

- New Testament manuscript
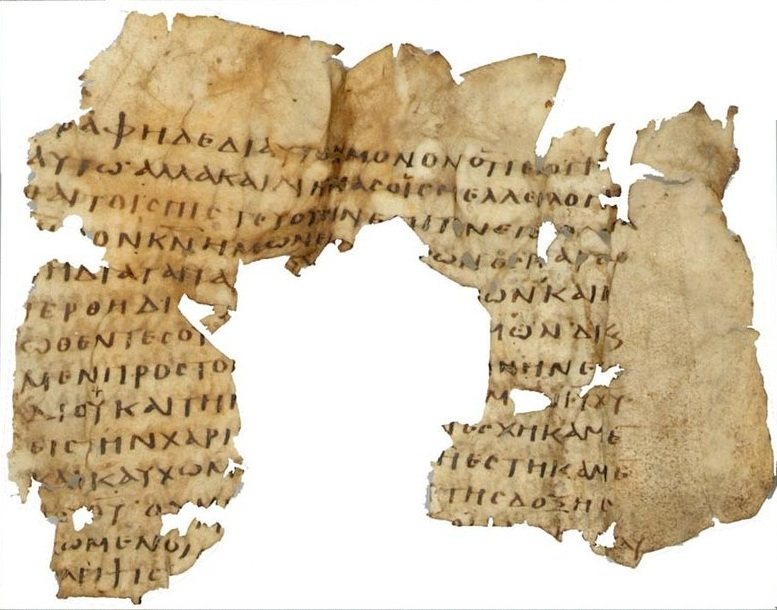
- Text: Romans 4:23-5:3; 5:8-13
- Date: c. AD 250
- Script: Greek
- Found: Cairo, (purchase) Leland
- Now at: Museum of the Bible
- Cite: W.H.P. Hatch, A Recently Discovered Fragment of the Epistle to the Romans, HTR 45 (1952): 81-85.
- Size: 1 leaf; 12 x 15 cm; 14 lines/page
- Type: Alexandrian
- Category: I
- Hand: reformed documentary
- Note: one deviation from Vaticanus in Rom. 5:1

Uncial 0220 (in the Gregory-Aland numbering), also known as the Wyman fragment, is a leaf of a third-century Greek codex containing the Epistle to the Romans.

== Description ==
Uncial 0220 measures 8,1 by 11cm. There are 14 lines to a page. The recto (4:23-5:3) is legible, but little can be made out on the verso (5:8-12). The scribe wrote in a reformed documentary hand.

The Alands describes the text-type as "strict".

Uncial 0220 is an important early witness to the Alexandrian text-type, agreeing with Vaticanus everywhere except Rom. 5:1. (See Below) It is classed as a "consistently cited witness of the first order" in the Novum Testamentum Graece. NA27 considers it even more highly than other witnesses of this type. It provides an exclamation mark (!) for "papyri and uncial manuscripts of particular significance because of their age."

The manuscript has evidence of the following nomina sacra: Κ̅Ν̅, Ι̅Υ̅, Ι̅Ν̅, Χ̅Υ̅, Θ̅Υ̅.

Rom. 5:1:

εχομεν: א^{1} B^{2} F G P Ψ 0220^{vid.} 104. 365. 1241. 1505. 1506. 1739^{c}. 1881. 2464. l 846 pm vg^{mss}

εχωμεν: א* A B* C D K L 33. 81. 630. 1175. 1739* pm lat bo; Mcion^{T}

== History ==
Currently it is dated by the INTF to the 3rd century.

It was purchased in Cairo in 1950 by Leland C. Wyman, a professor of biology at Boston University. Later part of it was bought by Martin Schøyen and now part of it is housed in the Martin Schøyen Collection in Oslo, and part in London. In 2012 this text was purchased at a Sotheby's auction by the Green Collection. It will be on the display at the Museum of the Bible in Washington, D.C.

The text was published by William Hatch in the Harvard Theological Review in 1952.

== See also ==
Other early uncials

- Uncial 0162
- Uncial 0171
- Uncial 0189
- Uncial 0301

Sortable lists

- List of New Testament uncials
- List of New Testament papyri

Related articles

- Textual criticism
- Biblical manuscript
