= Frank Hanna III =

American businessman and Catholic philanthropist

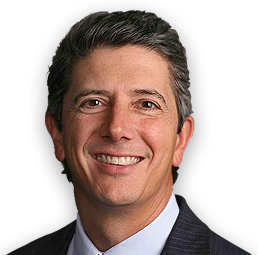
Hanna in 2009

Frank J. Hanna III is an American entrepreneur, merchant banker and philanthropist. He was one of three entrepreneurs profiled in the Acton Institute and PBS documentary film The Call of the Entrepreneur.

Hanna has been described as "one of the leading Catholic philanthropists in the USA."

== Education and career ==
Hanna was a corporate attorney with Troutman Sanders, a multi city law firm headquartered in Atlanta. Since 2006, he has served as CEO of an investment firm, Hanna Capital, LLC.

Hanna received his BBA from the University of Georgia where he was a Foundation Fellow and a Truman Scholar. He subsequently received his JD from the University of Georgia School of Law. Hanna and his younger brother David devised a methodology for the valuation of loan portfolios. The brothers founded an investment firm to employ this methodology, which they later sold to a private equity firm.

== Public service ==
Hanna has been devoted to the cause of education for over 40 years. He has helped start and fund fourteen educational initiatives, ranging from preschool to the post-secondary level.

In 2002, Hanna was chosen by George W. Bush to be co-chair of the President's Advisory Commission on Educational Excellence for Hispanic Americans and oversaw the production and delivery of its report to the President, From Risk to Opportunity.

== Catholic service ==
Hanna has spoken to Catholic leaders at conferences at the Vatican and has often been a featured guest on local and national media programs. For decades Hanna has served on the boards of numerous organizations in support of the Catholic Church in Atlanta, nationally, and at the Vatican.

He is the founder of The Solidarity Association, an Association of the Christian Faithful established with the approval and guidance of the late Archbishop John F. Donoghue. The Association seeks to strengthen and renew the Church by assisting in critical missions within the Church for which others may not be equipped.

== Hanna Papyrus I ==
By means of The Solidarity Association, Hanna obtained from the Bodmer Foundation in Cologny, Switzerland the Hanna Papyrus I, previously known as Bodmer Papyri XIV-XV. Dating from between 175 and 225 AD, this papyrus contains the oldest extant copy of portions of the Gospels of Luke and John as well as the oldest transcription of the "Our Father" prayer. In January 2007, Hanna and his family presented the papyrus to Pope Benedict XVI in a ceremony at the Vatican.

Cardinal Jean-Louis Tauran—then prefect of the Vatican Library—stated that "[t]he papyrus contains about half of each of the Gospels of Luke and John. It was written in Egypt and perhaps used as a liturgical book." The original Hanna Papyrus I is preserved in the Vatican Library’s secure vaults, while high-quality facsimiles are used for public exhibition and scholarly study worldwide.

== What Your Money Means ==
Published in 2008, What Your Money Means (And How to Use It Well) lays out paradigms for ethical engagement with wealth and delineates philanthropic strategies.

Hanna turns to the wisdom of various ages and cultures to affirm the fundamental premise that no matter how much of the goods of the earth we may acquire individually, we are never more than stewards of those goods, called to use them for our own good and the good of others.

About this book, Tom Monaghan, founder of Domino's Pizza, said: "I highly recommend this book to everyone who plans to engage in charitable giving no matter how much money they may have to give."

== A Graduate's Guide to Life ==
In 2017, Beacon Publishing published A Graduate's Guide to Life: Three Things They Don't Teach You in College That Could Make All the Difference.

In George Weigel's "The Summer Reading List" from 2017, he notes that the book "offers those just getting started in life nuggets of wisdom, drawn from the experience of a successful Catholic entrepreneur and generous philanthropist."

== Honours ==
=== Orders ===
- Holy See: Knight of the Grand Cross of the Order of St. Gregory the Great by Pope Benedict XVI
- Holy See: Knight of the Order of the Holy Sepulchre
- Sovereign Military Order of Malta: Knight of the Sovereign Military Order of Malta

=== Philanthropic ===
In recognition of his decades of sustained public service in education and other fields, Hanna received the Philanthropy Roundtable's William E. Simon Prize for Philanthropic Leadership "for his national leadership in K-12 education reform." He was also awarded the David R. Jones Award for Philanthropic Leadership by The Fund for American Studies.
