= Papyrus Bodmer XIX =

Codex Bodmer XIX is a Coptic uncial manuscript of the four Gospels, dated palaeographically to the 4th or 5th century. It contains the text of the Gospel of Matthew 14:28-28:20; Epistle to the Romans 1:1-2:3. It is written in the Sahidic dialect of the Coptic language.

The two books are paginated separately in the codex. According to Kasser four scribes worked on the manuscript: one wrote the text of Matthew, one who wrote the text of Romans, and two later correctors.

The text of the codex is a representative of the Alexandrian text-type.

It was published by Rodolphe Kasser in 1962.

The manuscript is currently housed at the Bibliotheca Bodmeriana (P. Bodmer XIX) in Cologny along with other manuscripts from the Bodmer Papyri.

== See also ==
- List of the Coptic New Testament manuscripts
- Coptic versions of the Bible
- Biblical manuscript
