= P73 (disambiguation) =

p73 is a protein.

P73 may also refer to:

- HMS Vox (P73), a British Royal Navy submarine
- Hughes XP-73, an American fighter aircraft design
- INS Anjadip (P73), two Indian Navy corvettes
- Papyrus 73, a biblical manuscript
- ThinkPad P73, a laptop
- P73, a state regional road in Latvia
