= Minuscule 37 =

- New Testament manuscript
- Text: Gospels
- Date: 11th century
- Script: Greek
- Now at: National Library of France
- Size: 31 cm by 24 cm
- Type: Byzantine text-type
- Category: V
- Note: marginalia

Minuscule 37 is a Greek minuscule manuscript of the New Testament Gospels, written on vellum. It is designated by the siglum 37 in the Gregory-Aland numbering of New Testament manuscripts, and A^{154} in the von Soden numbering of New Testament manuscripts.

Using the study of comparative handwriting styles (palaeography), it has been assigned to the 11th century.

== Description ==
The manuscript is a codex (precursor to the modern book format), containing the complete text of the four Gospels on 357 parchment leaves (sized 31 cm by 24 cm).

The text is divided according to the chapters (known as κεφαλαια / kephalaia), whose numbers are given in the margin, and their titles (known as τιτλοι / titloi) written at the top of the pages. There is also a division according to the Ammonian Sections (233 in Mark, ending at Mark 16:8), with references to the Eusebian Canons (both early divisions of the Gospels into sections).

It contains the Eusebian tables, the tables of contents (also known as κεφαλαια) before each Gospel, prolegomena (introductions), with short marginal notes, and commentaries (in Mark the commentary is that of Victorinus of Pettau), a synaxaria, and pictures.

The pericope John 7:53-8:11 is placed at the end of the Gospel. in John 8:6 it includes the textual variant μη προσποιουμενος.

== Text ==
The Greek text of the codex is considered to be a representative of the Byzantine text-type. Biblical scholar Kurt Aland placed it in Category V of his New Testament manuscript classification system. It was not examined by the Claremont Profile Method (a specific analysis of textual data).

In Luke 16:19 the manuscript has a note in the margin of uncertain date: ευρον δε τινες και του πλουσιου εν τισιν αντιγραφοις τουνομα Νινευης λεγομενον (It has been found in certain other manuscript copies that the name of this specific rich man is Nineves). The same note is seen in Minuscule 36. We have only one Greek manuscript with the textual variant ονοματι Ν[ιν]ευης (named N[in]eves) in Luke 16:19 - 𝔓^{75} (Papyrus 75). This reading is also seen in the Sahidic version.

== History ==
The earliest history of the manuscript is unknown. Biblical scholar Bernard de Montfaucon was the first who examined and described the manuscript. It was later examined and described by textual critics Johann J. Wettstein, Johann M. Scholz, and Paulin Martin. It was added to the list of the New Testament manuscripts by Wettstein. Biblical scholar Caspar René Gregory saw the manuscript in 1885.

The manuscript has been variably dated to the 11th or to the 12th century. It has currently been assigned by the INTF to the 11th century. It is currently housed in the Bibliothèque nationale de France (shelf number Coislin Gr. 21) in Paris.

== See also ==
- List of New Testament minuscules
- Biblical manuscript
- Textual criticism
