= Uncial 0162 =

- New Testament manuscript
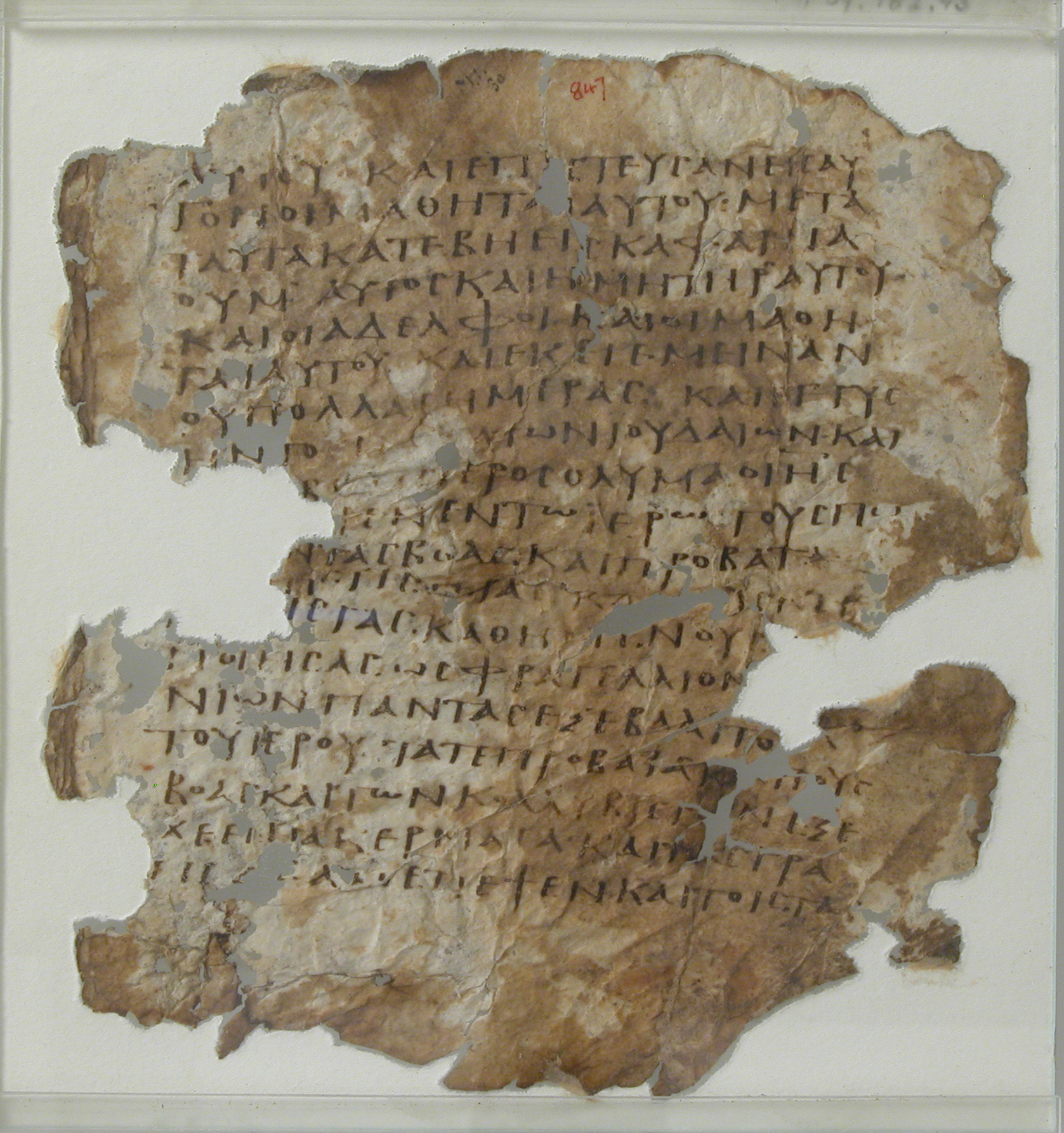
- Name: P. Oxy. 847
- Text: John 2:11-22
- Date: c. 300
- Script: Greek
- Found: Oxyrhynchus, Egypt
- Now at: Metropolitan Museum of Art
- Cite: Grenfell and Hunt Oxyrhynchus Papyri VI, 4-5
- Size: 1 vellum leaf; 16 x 15 cm; 20 lines/page
- Type: Alexandrian
- Category: I
- Note: very close to P^{66}, P^{75}, B

Uncial 0162 (in the Gregory-Aland numbering), ε 023 (Soden; also known as Papyrus Oxyrhynchus 847 or P.Oxy. 847), is one vellum leaf of a Codex containing The Gospel of John in Greek. It has been paleographically assigned a 3rd or 4th century CE date.

== Description ==
Uncial 0162 is one of the manuscripts excavated by Bernard Pyne Grenfell and Arthur Surridge Hunt in Oxyrynchus, Egypt and is now part of the Metropolitan Museum of Art collection in New York City.

Unical 0162 measures 16 cm by 15 cm from a page of 20 lines.

The scribe of Uncial 0162 was probably a professional.

Uncial 0162 uses the usual nomina sacra: Ι̅Η̅Σ̅, Ι̅Σ̅, and Π̅Ρ̅Σ̅.

Uncial 0162 had formally been assigned to the 4th century CE, but Comfort argued that the small omicron belongs to the 3rd rather than the 4th century CE.

The readings of Uncial 0162 are very close to Papyrus 66 (P^{66}), Papyrus 75 (P^{75}) and Codex Vaticanus (B).

The text of Uncial 0162 is closer to Vaticanus than Sinaiticus.

Uncial 0162 is classed as a "consistently cited witness of the first order" in the Novum Testamentum Graece. NA27 considers it even more highly than other witnesses of this type. It provides an exclamation mark (!) for "papyri and uncial manuscripts of particular significance because of their age."

The text was first published by Grenfell and Hunt in The Oxyrhynchus Papyri in 1908.

Currently Uncial 0162 is dated by the INTF to the 4th century CE.

== See also ==
- List of New Testament uncials

Other early uncials:

- Uncial 0171
- Uncial 0189
- Uncial 0220
- Papyrus Oxyrhynchus 846
- Papyrus Oxyrhynchus 848

Related articles:

- Textual criticism
