= Minuscule 36 =

- New Testament manuscript
- Text: Gospels
- Date: 12th century
- Script: Greek
- Now at: National Library of France
- Size: 29.3 cm by 21.3 cm
- Type: Byzantine text-type
- Category: V
- Note: marginalia

Minuscule 36 is a Greek minuscule manuscript of the New Testament Gospels, written on vellum. It is designated by the siglum 36 in the Gregory-Aland numbering of New Testament manuscripts, and A^{20} in the von Soden numbering of New Testament manuscripts. Using the study of comparative handwriting styles (palaeography), it has been assigned to the 12th century. It has complex contents and full marginal notes.

== Description ==
The manuscript is a codex (precursor to the modern book format), containing the complete text of the four Gospels on 509 parchment leaves (sized 29.3 cm by 21.3 cm). The text is written in 1 column per page, 19 lines per page.

The text is divided according to the chapters (known as κεφαλαια / kephalaia), whose numbers are given in the margin, and their titles (known as τιτλοι / titloi) written at the top of the pages. There is also a division according to the Ammonian Sections, with references to the Eusebian Canons (both early divisions of the Gospels into sections).

It contains the Epistle to Carpianus, the Eusebian Canon tables, the tables of contents (also known as κεφαλαια) before each Gospel, prolegomena (introductions), pictures, and commentaries (in Mark the commentary is that of Victorinus of Pettau). It has a marginal note which questions the authenticity of the Longer ending of Mark.

== Text ==
The Greek text of the codex is considered to be a representative of the Byzantine text-type. Biblical scholar Kurt Aland placed it in Category V of his New Testament manuscript classification system. It was not examined by the Claremont Profile Method (a specific analysis of textual data).

In Luke 16:19 the manuscript has a note in the margin of uncertain date: ευρον δε τινες και του πλουσιου εν τισιν αντιγραφοις τουνομα Νινευης λεγομενον (It has been found in certain other manuscript copies that the name of this specific rich man is Nineves). The same note is seen in manuscript Minuscule 37. We have only one Greek manuscript with the textual variant ονοματι Ν[ιν]ευης (named N[in]eves) in Luke 16:19 - 𝔓^{75} (Papyrus 75). This reading is also seen in the Sahidic version.

== History ==
The earliest history of the manuscript is unknown. The manuscript was held in the Great Lavra Monastery in Mount Athos (St. Athanasius). It was brought from Athos to France.

Biblical scholar Bernard de Montfaucon was the first who examined and described the manuscript. It was later examined and described by textual critics Johann J. Wettstein, Johann M. Scholz, and Paulin Martin. It was added to the list of the New Testament manuscripts by Wettstein. Biblical scholar Caspar René Gregory saw the manuscript in 1885.

The manuscript was dated by Scholz to the 11th, Gregory to the 10th century. It has currently been assigned by the INTF to the 12th century. It is currently housed in the Bibliothèque nationale de France (shelf number Coislin Gr. 20) in Paris.

== See also ==
- List of New Testament minuscules
- Biblical manuscripts
- Textual criticism
