= Peri Pascha =

2nd-century homily of Melito of Sardis

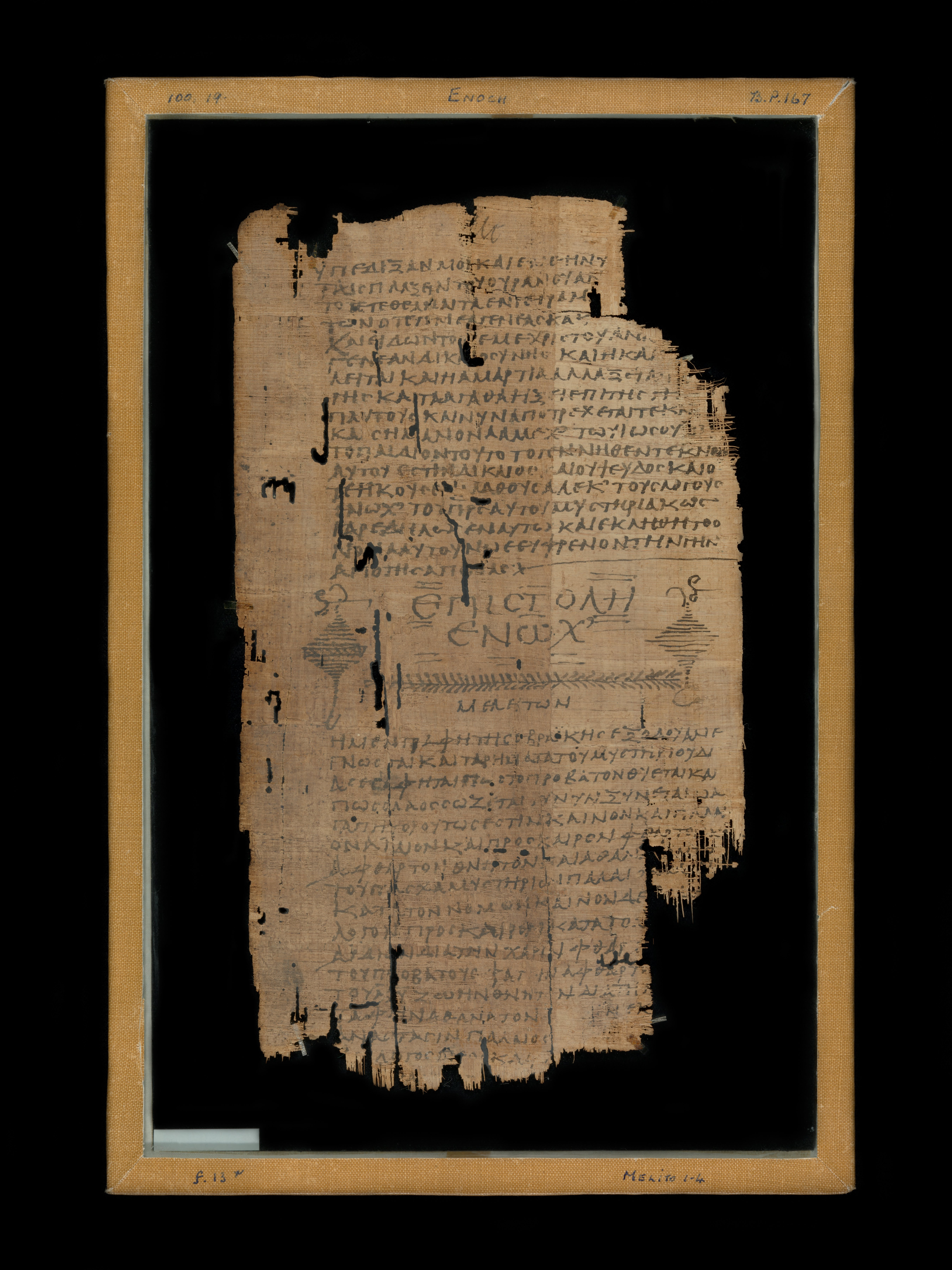
Papyrus with fragments of Book of Enoch and Peri Pascha. A decorative flourish marks the end of 'Book of Enoch' and the beginning of the 'Peri Pascha'. This simple embellishment represents some of the earliest ornamentation of Christian codices. Egypt, 4th century. Chester Beatty Library

Peri Pascha (Greek: Περὶ Πάσχα) (English title On the Pascha) is a 2nd-century homily of Melito of Sardis written between A.D.160 and 170 in Asia Minor. It was discovered last century and first published in 1940. It describes Christian doctrine on the Paschal mystery in the style of Second Sophistic period. It was originally conjectured to have probably been recited with the kind of cantillation customary in scripture reading. Its first editor, Campbell Bonner, entitled it mistakenly On the Passion. It was corrected to On the Pascha, thanks to the title found in the Papyrus Bodmer XIII, one of the Bodmer Papyri.

== Text and style ==
One of the outstanding features of the Peri Pascha is its extensive use of classical rhetorical devices such as homoioteleuton, polysyndeton, isocola, alliteration, chiastic antithesis and the deployment of rhetorical questions. The extensive use of such devices argues against the hypothesis, advanced by some scholars, that it was originally written in Syriac. In terms of literary genre, the original editor, the Michigan University papyrologist Campbell Bonner advanced the view, somewhat anachronistic, that it exhibited features of a Good Friday sermon. A general consensus formed that it was therefore to be classified as a type of homily. More recent commentaries entertain the idea, on the basis of the extensive use of rhetoric, that it is an example of declamation. Frank L. Cross proposed the idea that it was best read as a Christian Passover haggadah.

== Meditation on the Paschal mystery ==
Accepting the text as representing a homily, some have argued that it was initially pronounced during Easter festival night celebrated, according to the custom of Quartodecimans, together with Jewish Passover on the 14th of Nissan. As such a sermon its purpose would have been to reveal the meaning of Christ's Paschal mystery. Whatever its function it is the very first known use of the term Paschal mystery (literally Mystery of the Pascha).

Understand, therefore, beloved,
how it is new and old,
eternal and temporary,
perishable and imperishable,
mortal and immortal, this mystery of the Pascha:
old as regards the Law,
but new as regards the Word;
temporary as regards the model (gr. typos),
eternal because of grace;
perishable because of the slaughter of the sheep,
imperishable because of the life of the Lord;
mortal because of the burial in earth,
immortal because of the rising from the dead.

— On the Pascha, 2-3

The text here appears to be inspired by the Jewish Haggadah of Pesach, especially the following antitheses:

It is he /Jesus/ that delivered us from slavery to liberty,
from darkness to light,
from death to life,
from tyranny to eternal royalty.

— On the Pascha, 68

Eusebius writes about Melito in his Historia Ecclesiastica that he celebrates Passover on the fourteenth of Nisan, rather than the Sunday following, hence he was a Quartodeciman.

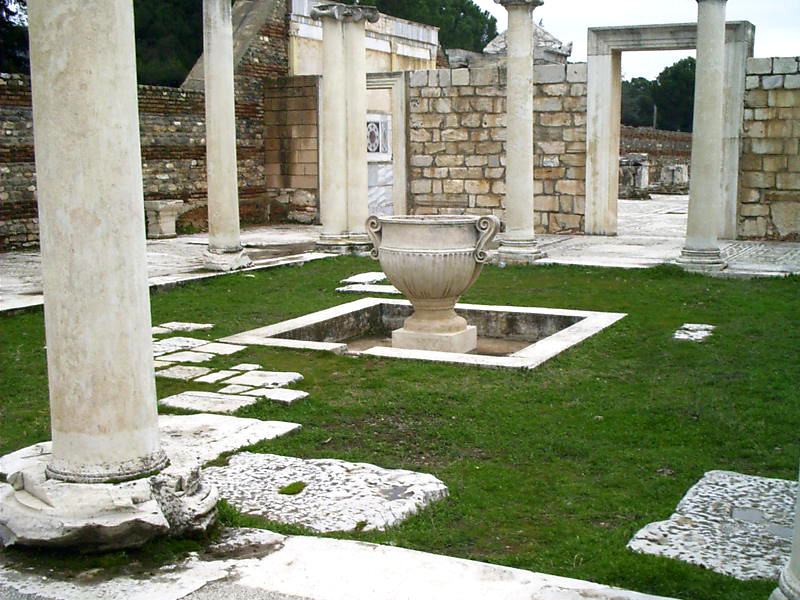
Remains of the Sardis Synagogue. Near present-day Sart in the Manisa province of Turkey.

== Charges against the Jews ==
In this homily, Melito formulated the charge of deicide, which has been taken to mean the author accused Jews of responsibility for the crucifixion of Jesus. He proclaimed that

ὁ θεὸς πεφόνευται. ὁ βασιλεὺς τοῦ Ἰσραὴλ ἀνῄρηται ὑπὸ δεξιᾶς Ἰσραηλίτιδος.

God has been murdered, the king of Israel has been put to death by an Israelite right hand.

— On the Pascha, 96

The significance of Israel here is much debated. It can be construed variously to refer to either (a) the Biblical Jews, (b) contemporary Jews, (c) inclusive of both (a) and (b), or (d) as a 'foil for Christian beliefs' involving a caricature of Judaism. Which of these reading proves more persuasive depends on several factors, such as the identification of the author as the Melito of Sardis, where archaeological excavations have brought to light remains of a vibrant Jewish community for this period. In such a context, it may reflect Christian fears of confident proselytizing by Jews, or a deep sense of their insecurity in the midst of a Jewish majority. These interpretations rest of somewhat frail assumptions, about the extent, for example, of attempts by Jews to press for conversion, and occasional Jewish persecutions were both sporadic and highly localized, as often as not instances of infra-communal bickering.

Some believe his preaching later inspired pogroms against the Jews. This has been challenged by scholars as historically tenuous. It is argued that this is a modern misreading of the text, and that, since the author espoused Quartodeciman beliefs, it is hard to imagine why he should be an advocate of any form of antisemitism. Todd Russell Hanneken, for example, has written: "In conclusion, we find Melito to be closer to the Prophets and the Sages than modern anti-Judaism. Melito identifies himself within the same tradition as those he criticizes, and he calls them to repentance with compassion." He preaches the victory over death achieved by Jesus having been himself led as a lamb. He clothed death with shame because he arose from the dead, and raised up mortals from the grave below (n. 67-68, cf. 100). In the context of Jesus' death and resurrection, Melito preaches forgiveness. Christ speaks of himself as of the one who is forgiveness itself:

I am the one that destroyed death (...)

Come then, all you families of men
who are permeated with sins
and get forgiveness of sins (cf. Ac 10:43, 26:10)
For I am your forgiveness,
I am the Pascha of salvation
I am the lamb slain for you,
I am your ransom,

I am your life

— On the Pascha, 102-103

The text is styled on the Gospel of John. Typical for Johannine eschatology is to assert that the salvation is already realized. The formula I am (Gr. Ego eimi) is borrowed from that Gospel e.g.: Jn 8:12; 11:25; 14:26.

== See also ==
- Didache
- The Shepherd of Hermas
- Paschal mystery
- Easter
- Passover

== Bibliography ==
- Bonner, Campbell, The Homily on the Passion by Melito, Bishop of Sardis, in: "Mélanges Franz Cumont = Annuaire de l'Institut de philologie et d'histoire orientales et slaves" 4 (1936), pp. 107–119.
- Cantalamessa, Raniero OFMCap, (1993) Easter in the Early Church. An Anthology of Jewish and Early Christian Texts, J.M. Quigley SJ, J.T. Lienhard SJ (translators & editors), Collegeville, Minnesota: The Liturgical Press, pp. 254. - ISBN 0-8146-2164-3
- Floyd V. Filson, "More Bodmer Papyri", The Biblical Archaeologist 25 (1962), pp. 50–57.
- Melito of Sardis. On Pascha and fragments (1979), Texts (Greek) and translation edits by S.G. Hall, Oxford, Clarendon Press, p. 99.
- Hall, S.G., "The Melito Papyri",Journal of Theological Studies, 19 (1968), pp. 476–508.
- Hall, S.G., (1970), Melito, Peri Pascha 1 and 2: Text and Interpretation, in: Kyriakon. Festschrift Johannes Quasten. Eds. Patrick Granfield and Josef A. Jungmann, 1:236-248, Münster, Aschendorff.
