= Papyrus 75 =

Early Greek New Testament manuscript

- New Testament manuscript
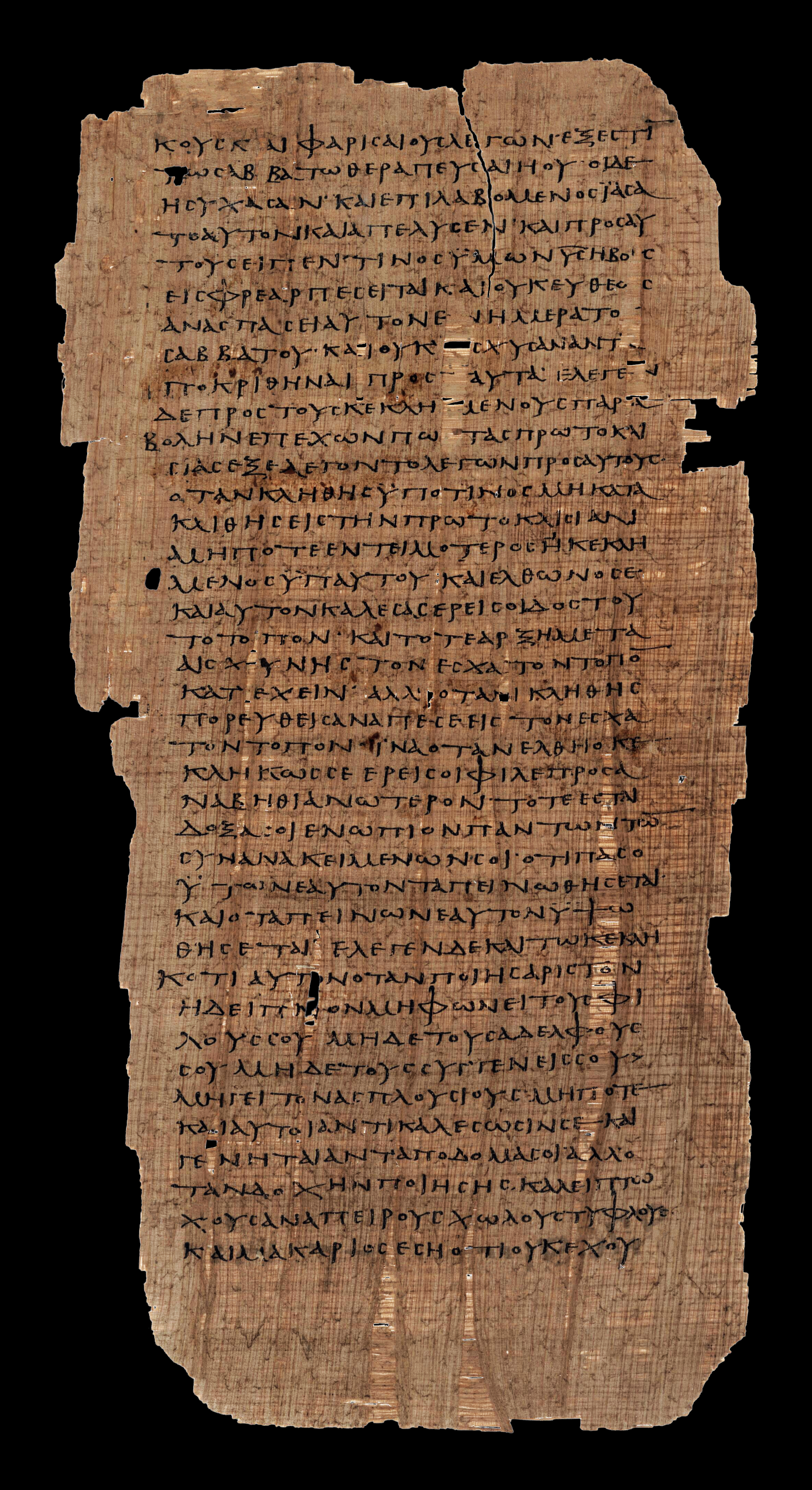
- 1B9 recto, Luke 14:3-14
- Name: P. Bodmer XIV–XV
- Sign: 𝔓^{75}
- Text: Luke 3:18–24:53 + John 1–15 (extensive portions)
- Date: c. 200-225, 175–225 (Martin and Kasser), late third century-early fourth century (Orsini), fourth century (Nongbri)
- Script: Greek
- Found: Pabau, Egypt
- Now at: Vatican Library, Rome
- Cite: V. Martin, R. Kasser, Papyrus Bodmer XIV–XV
- Size: 26 cm × 13 cm (10 1/4 in × 5 in)
- Type: Alexandrian text-type
- Category: I
- Note: very close to 𝔓^{66}, B, 0162

Papyrus 75, also known as Papyrus Bodmer XIV–XV, or Hanna Papyrus 1, is an early Greek New Testament manuscript written on papyrus containing text from the Gospel of Luke 3:18–24:53, and John 1:1–15:8. It is designated by the siglum 𝔓^{75} in the Gregory-Aland numbering of New Testament manuscripts. It is generally described as "the most significant" papyrus of the New Testament to be discovered so far.

Using the study of comparative writing styles (palaeography), it has been traditionally dated to the third century, although some recent studies have provided arguments to consider date ranges into the early fourth century, and not just the third century. It is due to the traditional early dating that the manuscript has a high evaluation, and the fact its text so closely resembles that of the fourth-century Codex Vaticanus (B).

== Description ==
The manuscript is a codex (precursor to the modern book format), made of papyrus, in single quire format (a single quire being a collection of pages placed on top of each other, then folded in half to create a book), measuring 27 cm × 13 cm (10 1/2 in × 5 in). It has between 38 and 45 lines per page, containing most of the text of the Gospel of Luke and the first fifteen chapters of the Gospel of John. It originally contained about 144 pages, 102 which have survived, of which 20 are fragmentary.

The papyrus is of a smooth and fine quality, with the verso (vertical striped side) nearly as smooth as the recto (horizontal striped side), and feels like hand-woven linen. The writing is a clear and careful majuscule. Along with 𝔓^{4}, 𝔓^{75} is one of the earliest manuscripts of the Gospel of Luke, containing most of Luke 3:18–24:53. An unusual feature of this codex is that when the Gospel of Luke ends, the Gospel of John begins on the same page. It uses a staurogram (⳨) in Luke 9:23, 14:27, and 24:7.

== Text ==
The text is considered to be a representative of the Alexandrian text-type: the text-types are groups of different manuscripts which share specific or generally related readings, which then differ from each other group, and thus the conflicting readings can separate out the groups, which are then used to determine the original text as published; there are three main groups with names: Alexandrian, Western, and Byzantine. Textual critic and biblical scholar Kurt Aland placed it in Category I of his New Testament manuscript text classification system. Category I manuscripts are described as being manuscripts "of a very special quality, i.e., manuscripts with a very high proportion of the early text, presumably the original text, which has not been preserved in its purity in any one manuscript."

The text is closer to Codex Vaticanus (B) than to Codex Sinaiticus (א). Agreement between 𝔓^{75} and B is 92% in John, and 94% in Luke. It concurs with 𝔓^{111}.

According to Aland, 𝔓^{75} is the key for understanding the primitive textual history of New Testament, but recently palaeographer and religious history scholar Brent Nongbri has argued that though one can not conclusively rule out dating 𝔓^{75} to the late second or early third century, increasing the date range to include the fourth century is just as likely (or as he says, "if not more likely"). Accordingly, the similarity of the text in 𝔓^{75} and Codex Vaticanus might be better explained by considering both as products of a sort of textual recension which occurred in the fourth century.

== Some notable readings ==
The manuscript lacks the Pericope of the Adulteress, usually placed in translations at John 7:53–8:11. This omission is supported by: 𝔓^{66} א B A^{(vid)} C^{(vid)} L N T W X Δ Θ Ψ 0141 0211 3 9* 22 33 72 96 97 106 108 123 131 139 157 179* 249 250 253 565 1241 1333 1424 2768 a f l q sy ly pbo bo^{pt}; Or Hier^{mss}; plus according to Tischendorf, at least 50 others (see manuscript evidence against PdA).

Luke 8:21

αυτον (him) – 𝔓^{75} 705 b
αυτους (them) – Majority of manuscripts

Luke 11:4

αλλα ρυσαι ημας απο του πονηρου (but deliver us from evil)

omit – 𝔓^{75} א^{*, 2b} B L ƒ^{1} 700 vg sy^{s} sa, bo^{bt}
incl. – Majority of manuscripts

Luke 16:19

Ανθρωπος δε τις ην πλουσιος, ονοματι Ν[ιν]ευης, και ενεδιδυσκετο (There was a rich man, with the name N[in]eue, who clothed himself) –𝔓^{75} 36 37 sa
Ανθρωπος δε τις ην πλουσιος, και ενεδιδυσκετο (There was a rich man, who clothed himself) – Majority of manuscripts

(A scholion of uncertain date witnesses the reading ευρον δε τινες και του πλουσιου εν τισιν αντιγραφοις τουνομα Νινευης λεγομενον (There is also found, in certain copies, the name of the rich-man being called Ninevah).)

Luke 22:43–44

omit – 𝔓^{75} א^{2a} A B N T W 579 ℓ 844 sy^{s} sa bo^{pt}
incl. – Majority of manuscripts

Luke 23:34

ὁ δὲ Ἰησοῦς ἔλεγεν· Πάτερ, ἄφες αὐτοῖς, οὐ γὰρ οἴδασιν τί ποιοῦσιν (And Jesus said: Father forgive them, they know not what they do.)

omit – 𝔓^{75} א^{2a} B D^{*} W Θ 070 579 1241 a d sy^{s} sa bo^{pt}
incl. – Majority of manuscripts

Luke 24:26

βασιλειαν (kingdom) – 𝔓^{75}*
δοξαν (glory) – majority of mss

John 10:7

ο ποιμην} (shepherd) – 𝔓^{75} sa, ac
η θυρα (door) – majority

== History ==
The codex was discovered in the 1950s and once belonged to the Swiss book collector Martin Bodmer, and was previously designated as P. Bodmer XIV–XV. It was sold in 2006 and donated to the Vatican Library, which now refers to the manuscript as "Hanna Papyrus 1 (Mater Verbi)". The history before its discovery is unknown, but it is generally agreed the codex was originally made and used in Egypt. Evidence for this comes from a piece of papyrus stuck to the back of the codex's leather case, on which there was Coptic writing. Its writing appearance and use of paragraphos to indicate a change of speaker, also points towards an Egyptian provenance. It is currently housed in the Vatican Library (Hanna Papyrus 1) in Rome.

=== Date ===
Using the discipline of palaeoography, the codex was originally assigned to 175–225 CE by the first editors of the codex, Victor Martin and Rodolphe Kasser. They compared the handwriting to manuscripts P.Oxy. XXI 2293, P.Oxy. XXII 2322, P.Oxy. XXIII 2362, P.Oxy. XXIII 2363, and P.Oxy. XXII 2370. However, in 2016 Nongbri pointed out that all of these manuscripts had themselves been dated by means of comparative handwriting analysis and thus were not useful for establishing a date for 𝔓^{75}. Martin and Kasser also drew attention to two more objectively dated manuscripts (P.Flor. I 61 and P.FuadUniv. 19), but Nongbri pointed out that the scripts of these two pieces do not actually resemble the appearance of the script of 𝔓^{75}. He argued that the closest dated comparisons for the script of 𝔓^{75} were P.Herm. 4 and 5, which are from a fourth-century archive. Nongbri also pointed out codicological features of 𝔓^{75} which accorded with manuscripts firmly dated to the fourth century.

An alternative dating of 225–275 was suggested by Eric G. Turner, however he does not appear to have provided any palaeographical parallels for this dating. It is currently dated by the INTF to 200–225 CE. The Leuven Database of Ancient Books, however, assigns 𝔓^{75} to a date of "AD 275-325."

== See also ==
- List of New Testament papyri
- Bodmer Papyri

== Bibliography ==
- V. Martin, R. Kasser, Papyrus Bodmer XIV–XV: Evangiles de Luc et Jean, Vol. 1, Papyrus Bodmer XIV: Evangile de Luc chap. 3–24; vol. 2, Papyrus Bodmer XV: Evangile de Jean chap. 1–15, Cologny-Geneva: Biblioteca Bodmeriana, 1961.
- Aland, Kurt (2009). "Neue Neutestamentliche Papyri III". New Testament Studies. 22 (4): 375–96. doi:10.1017/S0028688500010080. S2CID 170642717.
- Nongbri, Brent (2026). "The Construction and Date of P.Bodmer 14–15 (P75): The Length of kollemata as a Criterion for Dating Papyrus Codices". Novum Testamentum. 68 (4): 518–38. doi:10.1163/15685365-bja10123.
