= L. O. Crosby Sr. =

American businessman (1869–1948)

- Crosby, c. 1930
- Born: Lucius Olen Crosby; February 22, 1869; Bogue Chitto, Mississippi, US
- Died: November 24, 1948 (aged 79); Foundation Hospital, New Orleans, Louisiana, US
- Resting place: Rose Hill Cemetery, Brookhaven, Mississippi
- Occupation: Businessman
- Spouse: Margaret Henrietta Reed (m. 1896)
- Children: 3

L. O. Crosby Sr. (February 22, 1869 – November 24, 1948) was an American businessman and timber industrialist in Mississippi. During his 50 years as an active industrialist, Crosby owned thousands of acres of southern pine timberlands and numerous sawmills for converting trees into lumber. He initiated construction of creosote treatment plants for preserving wood products, a tung-oil processing facility, and naval store facilities for extracting pine rosin from stumps that were removed from cutover forestlands.

== Early life ==
Crosby was born February 22, 1869, in Bogue Chitto, Mississippi, to Thomas Jefferson Crosby and Matilda Prestidge Crosby. He spent his youth working on his father's farmlands growing cotton in Lincoln and Pike Counties. Around age 20 and with only a third-grade education, Crosby left the family farm and set out on his own to labor in the timber industry – at first working behind oxen, hauling logs.

== Timber industrialist ==
In 1894, Crosby returned to the 160-acre (65 ha) family farm and married Margaret Henrietta Reed in 1896. He remained on the farm until 1905, when he sold the property, returned to logging, and entered into a partnership with a sawmill operator J.W. Welch in Bogue Chitto. In 1908, he became a manufacturer and dealer of wholesale lumber in Brookhaven, Mississippi. By 1917, Crosby had relocated to Picayune, Mississippi with his wife and three sons.

In 1917, L.O. Crosby and two partners (Miles Goodyear and Lamont Rowlands) purchased 42,000 acres (17,000 ha) of virgin longleaf pine timberland along the western edge of Pearl River County, Mississippi and created the Goodyear Yellow Pine Company to manage the property. Also in 1917, Crosby and partner, Lamont Rowlands, acquired the Rosa Lumber Company and sawmill near Picayune and approximately 3,500 acres (1,400 ha) of timberland in Hancock County, Mississippi. To process the timber into lumber, the Rosa sawmill was expanded, and a new Goodyear Yellow Pine Company sawmill was constructed east of Picayune. The combined processing capacity of the two sawmills was 450,000 board feet per day. In 1926, Rosa Lumber Company merged with Goodyear Yellow Pine Company. In 1929, Crosby took full ownership of Goodyear Yellow Pine Company. In 1950, Goodyear Yellow Pine Company became Crosby Forest Products Company.

In southwest Mississippi, about 50 miles west of Crosby's boyhood hometown of Bogue Chitto, the Foster Creek Lumber and Manufacturing Company in Stephenson, Mississippi was heavily mortgaged; their sawmill had closed in 1931; and their assets were being offered for sale as a result of the Great Depression. In 1934, with financial assistance from International Harvester Company, L.O. Crosby purchased the Foster Creek Lumber and Manufacturing Company's assets that included a sawmill, the company town of Stephenson, railroad infrastructure, and 55,000 acres (22,000 ha) of timberland. By then, Crosby's three sons had joined him in his timber enterprises. Crosby reopened the Stephenson sawmill and changed the town name to Crosby, Mississippi. In addition to lumber production, Crosby added a broom-handle factory and a creosote treatment plant for preserving utility poles, pilings, and railroad ties. The Crosby sawmill continued to operate under the name Crosby Lumber and Manufacturing Company for another 28 years, closing in 1963.

=== Tung oil industry ===
By 1931, the virgin pines on Crosby's timberlands around Picayune were almost exhausted and lumber markets had deteriorated as a result of the Great Depression. At that time, the Goodyear Yellow Pine Company was on the verge of liquidation. So as to retain his employees, Crosby expanded into diversified agricultural crops such as planting citrus trees and tung trees (Vernicia fordii) on his cutover lands. By the time the tung trees matured, the Crosby family had constructed their own tung-oil processing plant and paint factory in Picayune. In 1941, the Crosby processing plant sold its first 10,000 gallons of tung oil, shipped by rail to a buyer in Chicago.

In 1969, the tung-oil industry collapsed in Mississippi when Hurricane Camille destroyed about 40,000 acres of tung-tree plantations that never recovered.

=== Naval stores ===
In 1937, Crosby entered the naval stores industry by building a processing plant in Picayune to extract rosin from longleaf pine stumps left on his timberlands following logging.

The sluggish lumber industry of the early 1930s began to recover as the demand for lumber increased after 1939, when war broke out in Europe and the US entered World War II following the attack on Pearl Harbor. Lumber was in high demand for defense purposes especially in construction of military facilities within the US and abroad.

By the end of World War II, products from naval store industries were in high demand; consequently, the Crosby's expanded their business by purchasing stumping rights on thousands of cutover longleaf pine acres in Louisiana. The Crosby's chose DeRidder, Louisiana as the site to construct a second naval stores processing facility. In 1946, Crosby Naval Stores, Inc. became Crosby Chemicals, Inc. and the two plants were processing 1,600 tons of pine stumps daily into rosin, turpentine and resins.

In 1977, the Crosby company sold its Mississippi and Louisiana naval stores processing plants to concentrate on managing the company's forestlands.

== Public service ==
- President of Mississippi's Chamber of Commerce (1923–1930).
- Assisted Secretary of Commerce Herbert Hoover's committee to address relief efforts following the Great Mississippi Flood of 1927 as director of relief and rehabilitation.
- President of Mississippi's State Development Board.

== Death ==
Crosby died November 24, 1948, aged 79, at Foundation Hospital in New Orleans, and was interred at Rose Hill Cemetery in Brookhaven, Mississippi.

== Legacy ==
- Crosby, Mississippi – After L.O. Crosby purchased the assets of Foster Creek Lumber and Manufacturing Company in 1934, the town of Stephenson was renamed.
- L.O. Crosby Memorial Hospital – Built in Picayune between 1951 and 1954, the hospital served the community for 60 years. The building was vacated and demolished in 2013 when a new hospital replaced it.
- The Crosby–Schøyen Codex MS 193 derives its name as a result of a donation by the Lucius Olen and Margaret Reed Crosby family to the University of Mississippi in 1955. The university held the Codex until 1981.
- Crosby Land & Resources, L.L.C. – Described as, "... one of the largest privately held family owned non-industrial timberland companies in the United States."
- L.O. Crosby was inducted into the Mississippi Hall of Fame to honor his significant contributions to the state. His portrait is on display in Mississippi's Old Capitol Museum in Jackson.

== See also ==
Crosby Arboretum
