= Dishna Papers =

Collection of ancient manuscripts from 200 AD until the 6th century

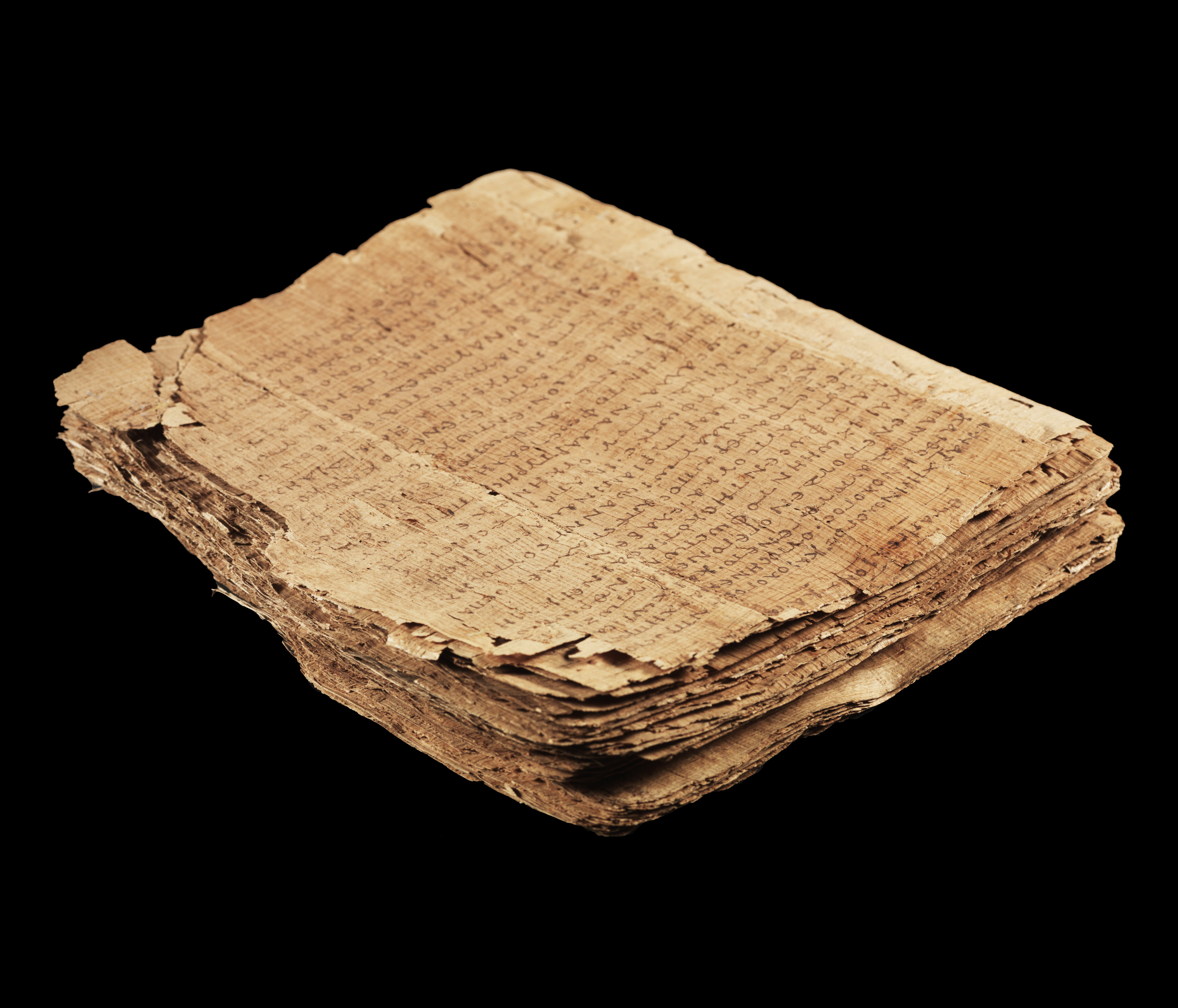
Papyrus 66 of the Bodmer Papyri

The Dishna Papers, also often known as the Bodmer Papyri, are a group of twenty-two papyri discovered in Dishna, Egypt in 1952. Later, they were purchased by Martin Bodmer and deposited at the Bodmer Library in Switzerland. The papyri contain segments from the Old and New Testaments, early Christian literature, Homer, and Menander. The oldest, P^{66}, dates to c. 200 AD. Most of the papyri are kept at the Bodmer Library, in Cologny, Switzerland outside Geneva.

In 2007, the Vatican Library acquired Bodmer Papyrus 14–15 (known as P^{75} and as the Mater Verbi (Hanna) Papyrus). Since the papers are held not only at the Bodmer Library, but also at the Vatican, Oslo, Barcelona, and other locations, many scholars have preferred the term Dishna Papers since the mid-2010s.

== Overview ==
The Dishna Papers were found in 1952 at Pabau near Dishna, Egypt, the ancient headquarters of the Pachomian order of monks; the discovery site is not far from Nag Hammadi, where the secreted Nag Hammadi library had been found some years earlier. The manuscripts were covertly assembled by a Cypriote, Phokio Tano of Cairo, then smuggled to Switzerland, where they were bought by Martin Bodmer (1899–1971). The series Papyrus Bodmer began to be published in 1954, giving transcriptions of the texts with note and introduction in French and a French translation. The papyri, now partially conserved in the Bodmer Library, in Cologny, outside Geneva, are not a gnostic cache, like the Nag Hammadi Library: they bear some pagan as well as Christian texts, parts of some thirty-five books in all, in Coptic and in Greek. With fragments of correspondence, the number of individual texts represented reaches to fifty. Most of the works are in codex form, a few in scrolls. Three are written on parchment.

Books V and VI of Homer's Iliad (P^{1}), and three comedies of Menander (Dyskolos (P^{4}), Samia and Aspis) appear among the Bodmer Papyri, as well as gospel texts: Papyrus 66 (P^{66}), is a text of the Gospel of John, dating around 200 AD, in the manuscript tradition called the Alexandrian text-type. Aside from the papyrus fragment in the Rylands Library Papyrus P52, it is the oldest testimony for John; it omits the passage concerning the moving of the waters (John 5:3b-4) and the pericope of the woman taken in adultery (John 7:53-8:11). 𝔓^{72} is the earliest known copy of the Epistle of Jude, and 1 and 2 Peter. Papyrus 75 (P^{75}) is a partial codex containing most of Luke and John. Comparison of the two versions of John in the Bodmer Papyri with the third-century Chester Beatty Papyri convinced Floyd V. Filson that "...there was no uniform text of the Gospels in Egypt in the third century."

There are also Christian texts that were declared apocryphal in the fourth century, such as the Infancy Gospel of James. There is a Greek-Latin lexicon to some of Paul's letters, and there are fragments of Melito of Sardis. Among the works is The Vision of Dorotheus, one of the earliest examples of Christian hexametric poem, attributed to a Dorotheus, son of "Quintus the poet" (assumed to be the pagan poet Quintus Smyrnaeus). (P^{29}). The earliest extant copy of the Third Epistle to the Corinthians is published in Bodmer Papryri X.

The collection includes some non-literary material, such as a collection of letters from the abbots of the monastery of Saint Pachomius, raising the possibility that the unifying circumstance in the collection is that all were part of a monastic library.

The latest of the Bodmer Papyri (P^{74}) dates to the sixth or seventh century.

== Vatican acquisition ==
Plans announced by the Foundation Bodmer in October 2006 to sell two of the manuscripts for millions of dollars, to capitalize the library, which opened in 2003, drew consternation from scholars around the world, fearing that the unity of the collection would be broken.

In March 2007, the Vatican announced that it had acquired the Bodmer Papyrus XIV-XV (P^{75}), which is believed to contain the world's oldest known written fragment from the Gospel of Luke, the earliest known Lord's Prayer, and one of the oldest written fragments from the Gospel of John.

The papyri had been sold for an undisclosed "significant" price to Frank Hanna III, of Atlanta, Georgia. In January 2007, Hanna presented the papyri to the Pope. They are kept in the Vatican Library and will be made available for scholarly review, and in the future, excerpts may be put on display for the general public. They were transported from Switzerland to the Vatican in "an armed motorcade surrounded by people with machine guns."

== Relationship with the Nag Hammadi library ==
Lundhaug (2018) argues that the Dishna Papers in fact came from the same monastic library as the Nag Hammadi library. Linjamaa (2024) also recognizes that the Dishna Papers likely came from the same monastic scribal group that had copied the Nag Hammadi texts.

== Bible-related manuscripts ==
=== Greek ===
- Papyrus Bodmer II (𝔓^{66})
- Bodmer V – Nativity of Mary, Apocalypse of James; fourth century
- Papyrus Bodmer VII-IX (𝔓^{72}) — Epistle of Jude, 1-2 Peter, Psalms 33-34
- Bodmer X – Epistle of Corinthians to Paul and Third Epistle of Paul to the Corinthians; third/fourth century
- Bodmer XI – Ode of Solomon 11; fourth century
- Papyrus Bodmer XIV-XV (𝔓^{75})
- Papyrus Bodmer XVII (𝔓^{74})
- Bodmer XXIV – Psalms 17:46-117:44; third/fourth century
- Bodmer XLVI – Daniel 1:1-20
- Papyrus Bodmer L – Matthew 25-26; seventh century

=== Coptic ===
- Bodmer III – John 1:1-21:25; Genesis 1:1-4:2; fourth century; Bohairic
- Bodmer VI – Proverbs 1:1-21:4; fourth/fifth century; Paleo-Theban ("Dialect P")
- Bodmer XVI – Exodus 1:1-15:21; fourth century
- Bodmer XVIII – Deuteronomium 1:1-10:7; fourth century
- Bodmer XIX – Matthew 14:28-28:20; Romans 1:1-2:3; fourth/fifth century; Sahidic
- Bodmer XXI – Joshua 6:16-25; 7:6-11:23; 22:1-2; 22:19-23:7; 23:15-24:2; fourth century
- Bodmer XXII (Mississippi Codex II) – Jeremiah 40:3-52:34; Lamentations; Epistle of Jeremiah; Book of Baruch; fourth/fifth century
- Bodmer XXIII – Isaiah 47:1-66:24; fourth century
- Bodmer XL – Song of Songs
- Bodmer XLI – Acta Pauli; fourth century; sub-Achmimic
- Bodmer XLII – 2 Corinthians; dialect reported by Wolf-Peter Funk to be Sahidic
- Bodmer XLIV – Book of Daniel; Bohairic
- Crosby-Schøyen Codex MS 193 (Mississippi Codex I) - Jonah, 1 Peter, Peri Pascha, third century

== See also ==
- List of New Testament papyri
- Bodmer Library
- Nag Hammadi library
