= CICR =

CICR may refer to:

- Calcium-induced calcium release
- Comité international de la Croix-Rouge, the International Committee of the Red Cross, or ICRC
- The Center for International Conflict Resolution
- Cumulative incidence competing risk
