= Martin Bodmer =

Swiss scholar (1899–1971)

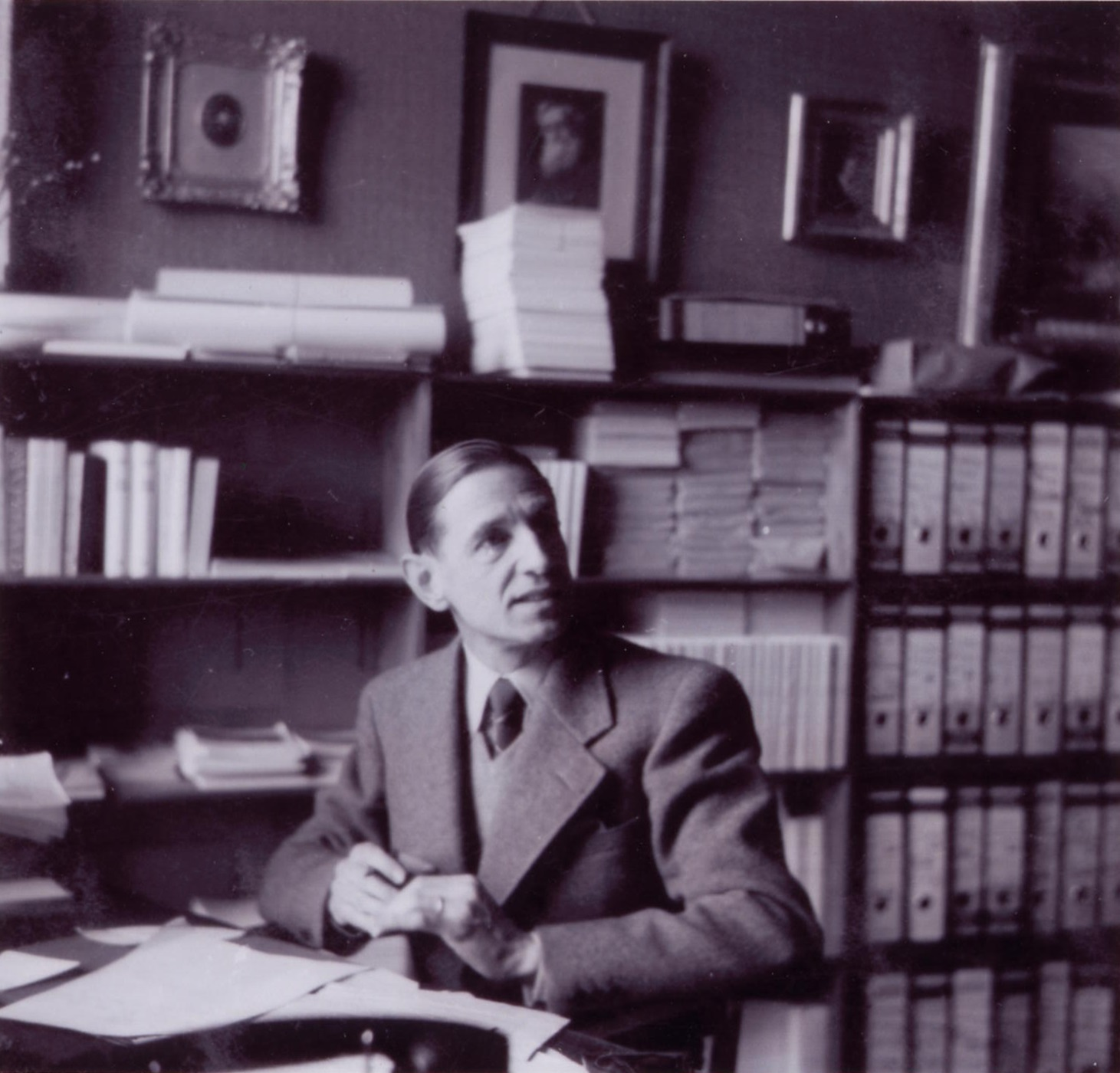
- Bodmer at CICR
- Born: Martin Bodmer; 13 November 1899; Zurich, Switzerland
- Died: 21 March 1971 (aged 71); Geneva, Switzerland
- Occupations: Bibliophile, scholar, book collector
- Known for: Founding Bodmer Library
- Spouse: Alice Elsa Naville (m. 1927)

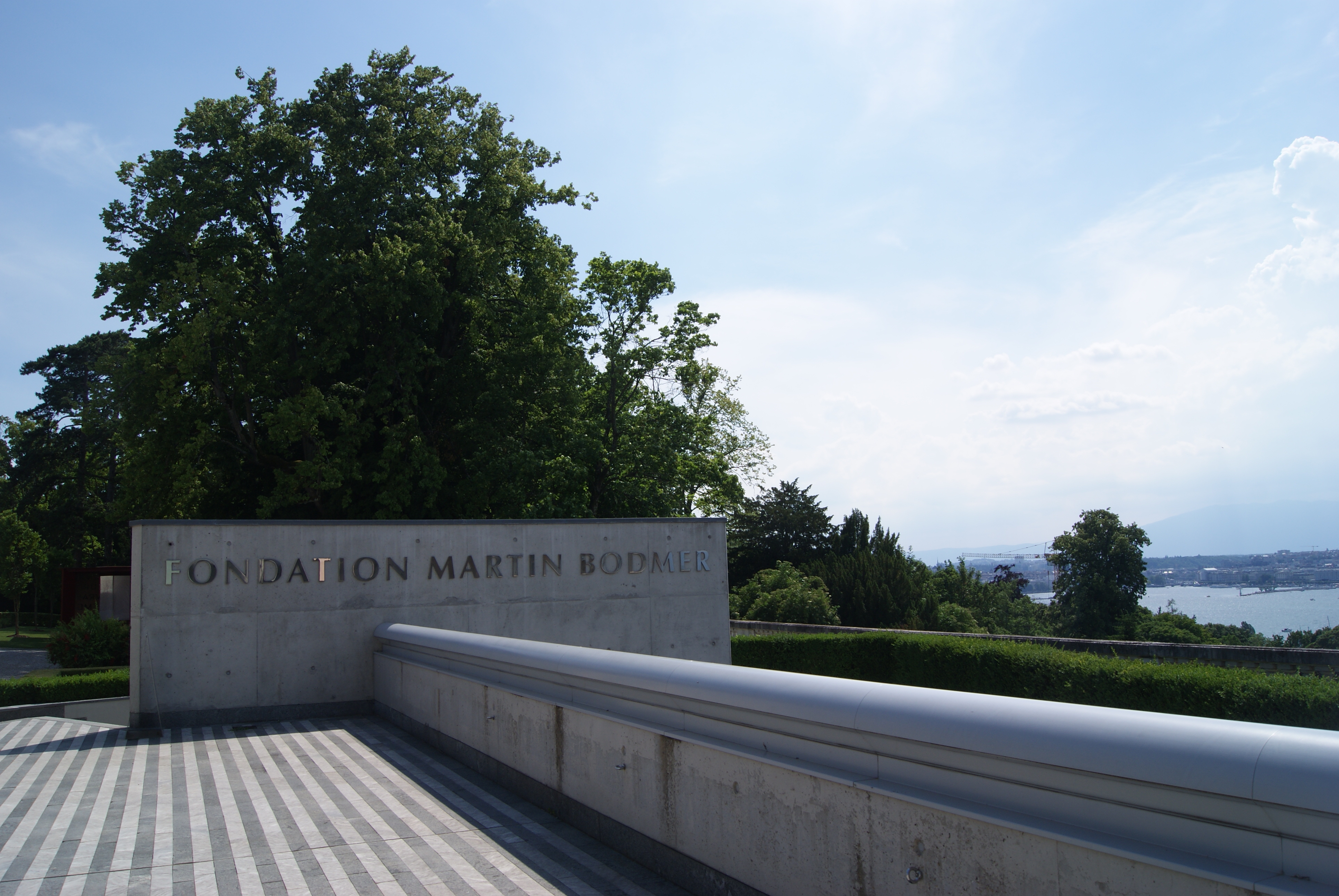
The Martin Bodmer Foundation in Geneva.

Martin Bodmer (13 November 1899 – 22 March 1971) was a Swiss bibliophile, scholar and book collector who was most prominent for his vast collection of world literature which is currently housed at Bodmer Library in Cologny, Switzerland.

== Early life and education ==
Bodmer was born 13 November 1899 in Zurich, Switzerland, the youngest of five children, to Hans Conrad Bodmer (1851–1916), an industrialist, and Mathilde Wilhelmine "Tilly" Bodmer (née Zoelly; 1866–1926), into an affluent family. His siblings were; Helene Bertha Elisabeth von Schulthess-Rechberg (née Bodmer; 1888–1970), Henry Bodmer (1889–1947), Anna Barbara Elisabeth Bodmer (1890–1897) and Hans Conrad Ferdinand Bodmer (1891–1956).

His father belonged to a well established bourgeois family from Zurich. He was an industrialist, businessman, philanthropist and most notably Belgian consul, who left a large fortune upon his death. His mother ran a literary salon which was frequented by Hugo von Hofmannsthal and Paul Valéry, a friend of the family.

In 1918, Bodmer began studying German language at the University of Zurich and spent a semester at the University of Heidelberg where he took a course from Friedrich Gundolf. Eventually, he gave up his studies and took a trip to United States and Paris. He studied a few semesters of philosophy and in 1921 he founded the Gottfried Keller Prize, a renowned Swiss literary award.

== Career ==
In 1930 he founded the bimonthly "Corona," which was published until 1943 in Munich. With the start of the Second World War he devoted himself to the International Committee of the Red Cross and became its vice president. During the Second World War, many famous writers and journalists stayed in Bodmer's house in Zurich, including Rudolf Borchardt, Selma Lagerlöf, Rudolf Alexander Schröder, and Paul Valéry.

He started collecting rare books at the age of 16 and devoted all his life to create an extraordinary library of world literature. Bodmer selected the works centering on what he saw as the five pillars of world literature: the Bible, Homer, Dante Alighieri, William Shakespeare and Johann Wolfgang von Goethe. He prioritized autographs and first editions. In 1928 the villa was too small for his collection and he bought an adjacent former school building to accommodate his books. After the war he resumed his long-standing project to build a "Library of world literature", or "Bodmer Library" in specially designed buildings, collecting the most significant messages of humankind, including not only literature and art, but also religion, history and politics. He left Zurich and transferred its collection to Cologny, just outside Geneva, on the shores of Lake Geneva.

Bodmer amassed 150,000 works in eighty languages, including first editions of major works, the Papyrus 66 which is one of the oldest almost completely preserved manuscripts of John's Gospel (2nd century), the original of Grimms' Fairy Tales, the only copies of the Gutenberg Bible and the Shakespeare First Folio in Switzerland, a string quintet by Mozart, the prose version of Gotthold Lessing's Nathan the Wise, Gustave Flaubert's Madame Bovary, Thomas Mann's Lotte in Weimar, original editions of Don Quixote, Goethe's Faust, and valuable papyri, known as Bodmer Papyri, from ancient times, including a papyrus manuscript dating to the third century of the complete Dyskolos, an Ancient Greek comedy by Menander, which was recovered and published in 1959. Bodmer extended its project to cuneiform tablets and ancient coins.

Before his death, Bodmer refused the proposal of Harry H. Ransom who offered him $60 million (1971) to buy the collection. With his children’s consent, Bodmer placed his collection at the heart of the Martin Bodmer Foundation, a private cultural institution headquartered in Cologny, which continues to manage and expand the collection.

== Personal life ==
In 1927, Bodmer married Alice Elsa Naville (1906–1982), daughter of Henri Agenor Naville (1875–1939), an engineer at Escher, Wyss & Cie., and Martha Clotilde Naville (née von Muralt; 1878–1939). They had four children.
