= Papyrus 66 =

Papyrus 𝔓^{66}
- New Testament manuscript
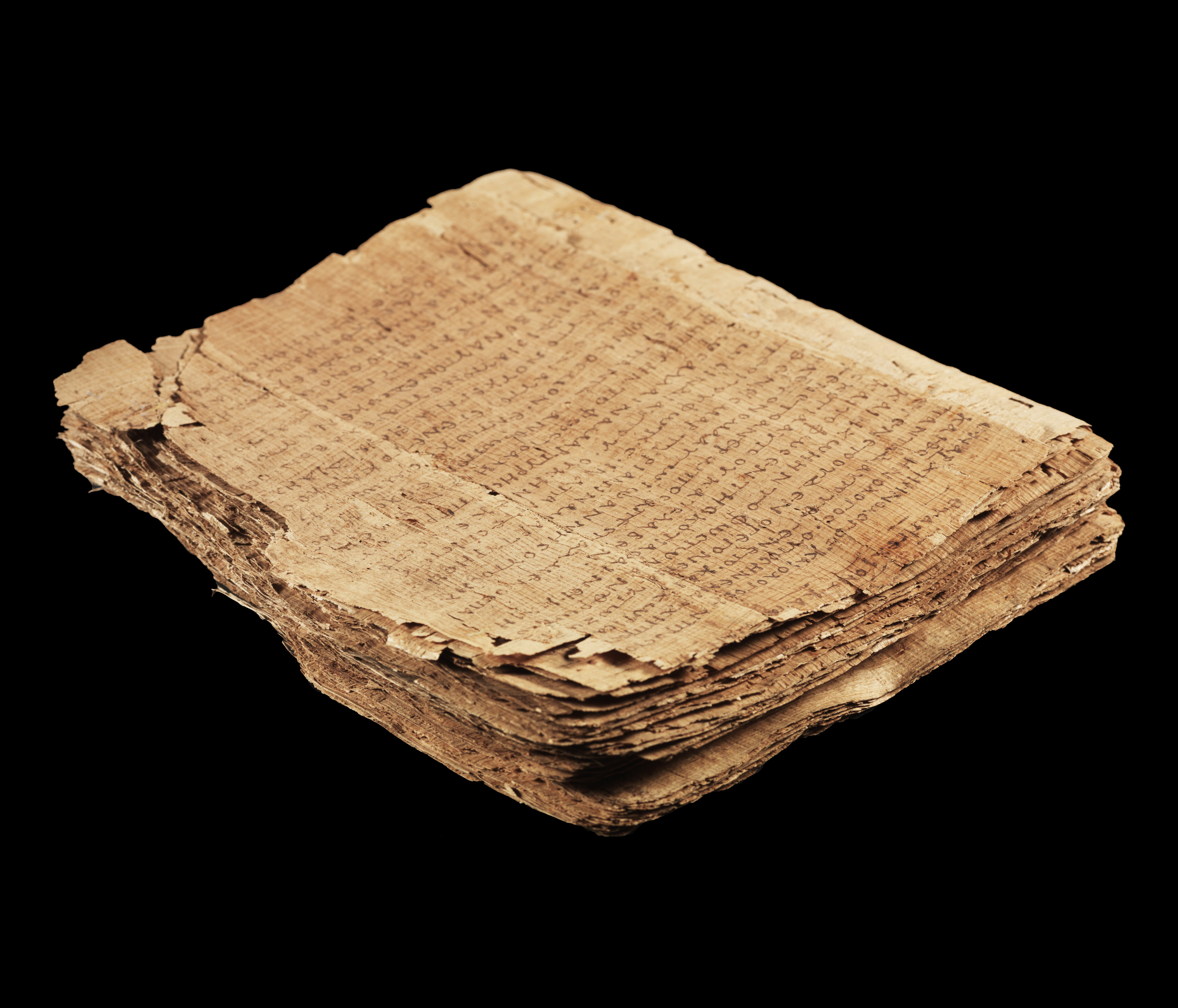
- First page (John 1:1-14) of Papyrus 66 lying on the around five quires of the codex
- Name: P. Bodmer II
- Text: John 1:1–6:11; 6:35–14:26,29–30; 15:2–26; 16:2–4,6-7; 16:10–20:20,22–23; 20:25–21:9,12,17
- Date: c. 150-250, about AD 200 (Martin), AD 100-150 (Hunger)
- Found: Jabal Abu Mana, Egypt
- Now at: Bodmer Library, Geneva
- Cite: Martin, Victor, ed. (1956). Papyrus Bodmer II: Évangile de Jean, chap. 1-14. Cologny-Genève: Bibliotheca Bodmeriana. Martin, Victor, ed. (1958). Papyrus Bodmer II, Supplément: Évangile de Jean, chap. 14-21. Cologny-Genève: Bibliotheca Bodmeriana. Martin, Victor; Barns, J.W.B., eds. (1962). Papyrus Bodmer II, Supplément: Évangile de Jean, chap. 14-21. Cologny-Genève: Bibliotheca Bodmeriana. Zumstein, Jean, ed. (2008). L'Évangile selon Jean: Introduction et traduction. Paris: Presses Universitaires de France.
- Size: 39 folios; 14.2×16.2 cm; 15-25 lines per page
- Type: Alexandrian text-type
- Category: I
- Note: very close to P^{75}, B, 0162

Papyrus 66 (also referred to as 𝔓^{66}) is a near complete codex of the Gospel of John, and part of the collection known as the Bodmer Papyri.

== Description ==
The manuscript contains John 1:1–6:11, 6:35b–14:26, 29–30; 15:2–26; 16:2–4, 6–7; 16:10–20:20, 22–23; 20:25–21:9, 12, 17. It is one of the oldest well-preserved New Testament manuscripts known to exist. Its original editor assigned the codex to the early third century, or around AD 200, on the basis of its style of handwriting. Herbert Hunger later claimed that the handwriting should be dated to an earlier period in the middle or early part of the second century. More recently, Brent Nongbri has produced a broader study of the codex and argued that when one takes into consideration the format, construction techniques, and provenance of the codex along with the handwriting, it is more reasonable to conclude that the codex was produced "in the early or middle part of the fourth century." In common with both the other surviving early papyri of John's Gospel – P^{45} (apparently), P^{75}, and most New Testament uncials – Papyrus 66 does not include the pericope of the adulteress (7:53-8:11), demonstrating the absence of this passage in all the surviving early witnesses of the Gospel of John. The manuscript also contains, consistently, the use of Nomina Sacra.

Studies done by Karyn Berner and Philip Comfort contended that 𝔓^{66} had the work of three individuals on it: the original, professional scribe; a thoroughgoing corrector; and a minor corrector. But more recently James Royse argues that, with the possible exception of John 13:19, the corrections are all by the hand of the original copyist. Elizabeth Schrader Polczer adds that, in the case of John 11, the copyist may have introduced an entirely new character, Martha, to the text, but this argument remains controversial.

The staurogram appears in at least ten places in the papyrus (corresponding to chapter 19 of the Gospel).

== Text ==
The Greek text of this codex is a representative of the Alexandrian text-type. Aland ascribed it as "Free text" and placed it in I Category.

A transcription of every single page of 𝔓^{66} is contained in Text of the Earliest New Testament Greek manuscripts.

In John 1:15 ο οπισω ] ο πισω, the reading is supported by Codex Sangallensis 48 and Minuscule 1646.

In John 13:5 it has unique textual variant ποδονιπτηρα (podoniptēra, "foot-basin") instead of νιπτηρα (niptēra, "basin").

In John 13:7 it has αρ (error) instead of αρτι (now).

== History ==
The manuscript was found in 1952 at Jabal Abu Mana near Dishna (Egypt). The preservation level of 𝔓^{66} surprised scholars because the first 26 leaves were basically fully intact, and even the stitching of the binding remained.

It was published in 1956 and it was the most important New Testament manuscript publication since the Chester Beatty Papyri in 1933–1934.

It is currently housed at the Cologny-Geneva, Switzerland: Bibliotheca Bodmeriana. The Papyrus contains 39 folios – that is 78 leaves, 156 pages – at a size of 14.2 cm x 16.2 cm for each leaf with roughly 15-25 lines per page.

== See also ==
- List of New Testament papyri
- Bodmer papyri
