= Papyrus 73 =

Papyrus 𝔓^{73}
- New Testament manuscript
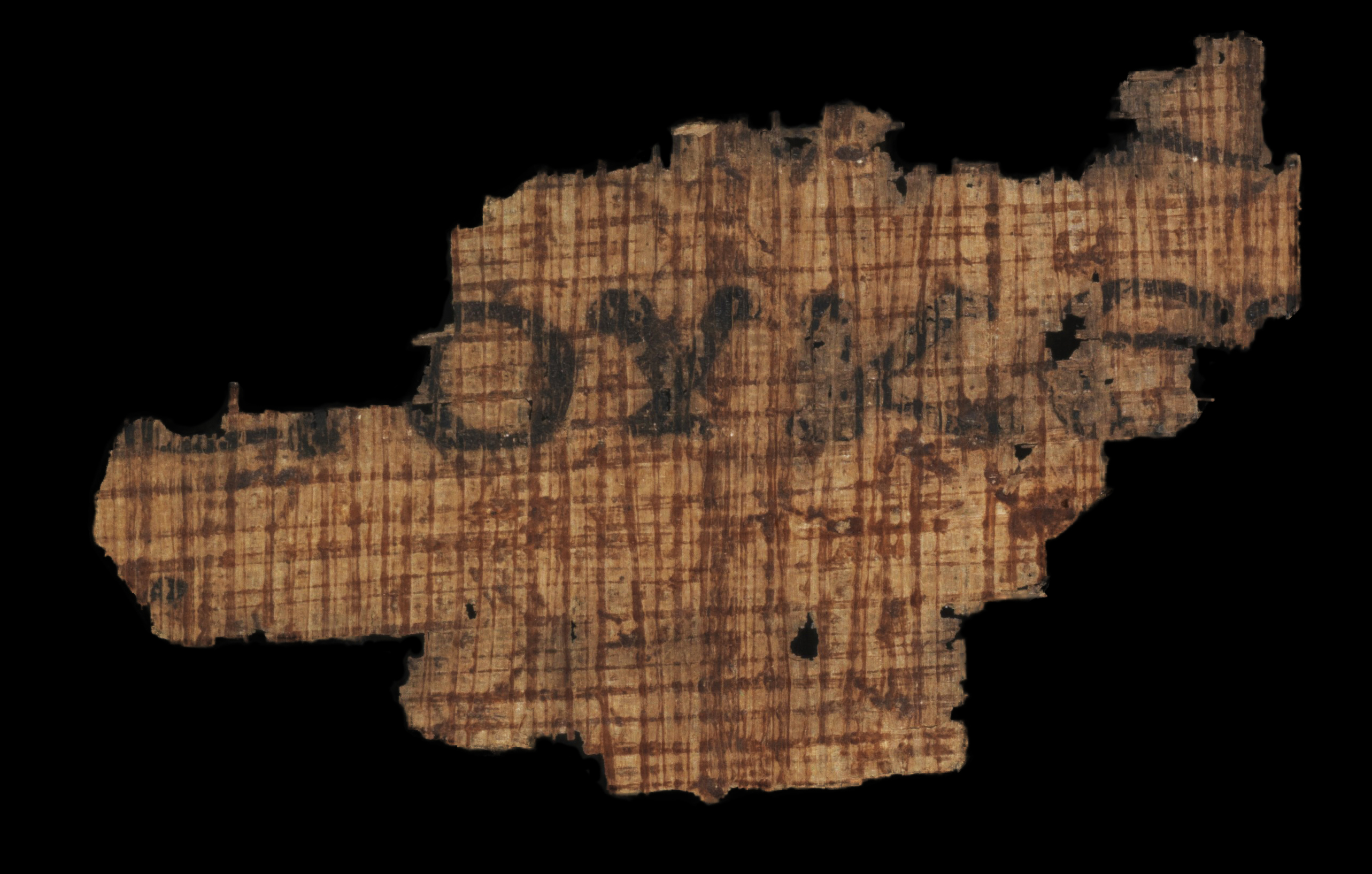
- Recto, Matthew 25:43
- Name: P. Bodmer L
- Text: Matthew 25; 26 †
- Date: 7th century
- Script: Greek
- Found: Egypt
- Now at: Bibliotheca Bodmeriana
- Cite: K. Aland, Neue Neutestamentliche Papyri II, NTS 9 (1962-1963), pp. 303-316.
- Type: Byzantine text-type
- Category: V

Papyrus 73 (in the Gregory-Aland numbering), designated by 𝔓^{73}, is a copy of the New Testament in Greek. It is a papyrus manuscript of the Gospel of Matthew. The surviving texts of Matthew are verses 25:43; 26:2-3. The manuscript paleographically has been assigned to the 7th century.

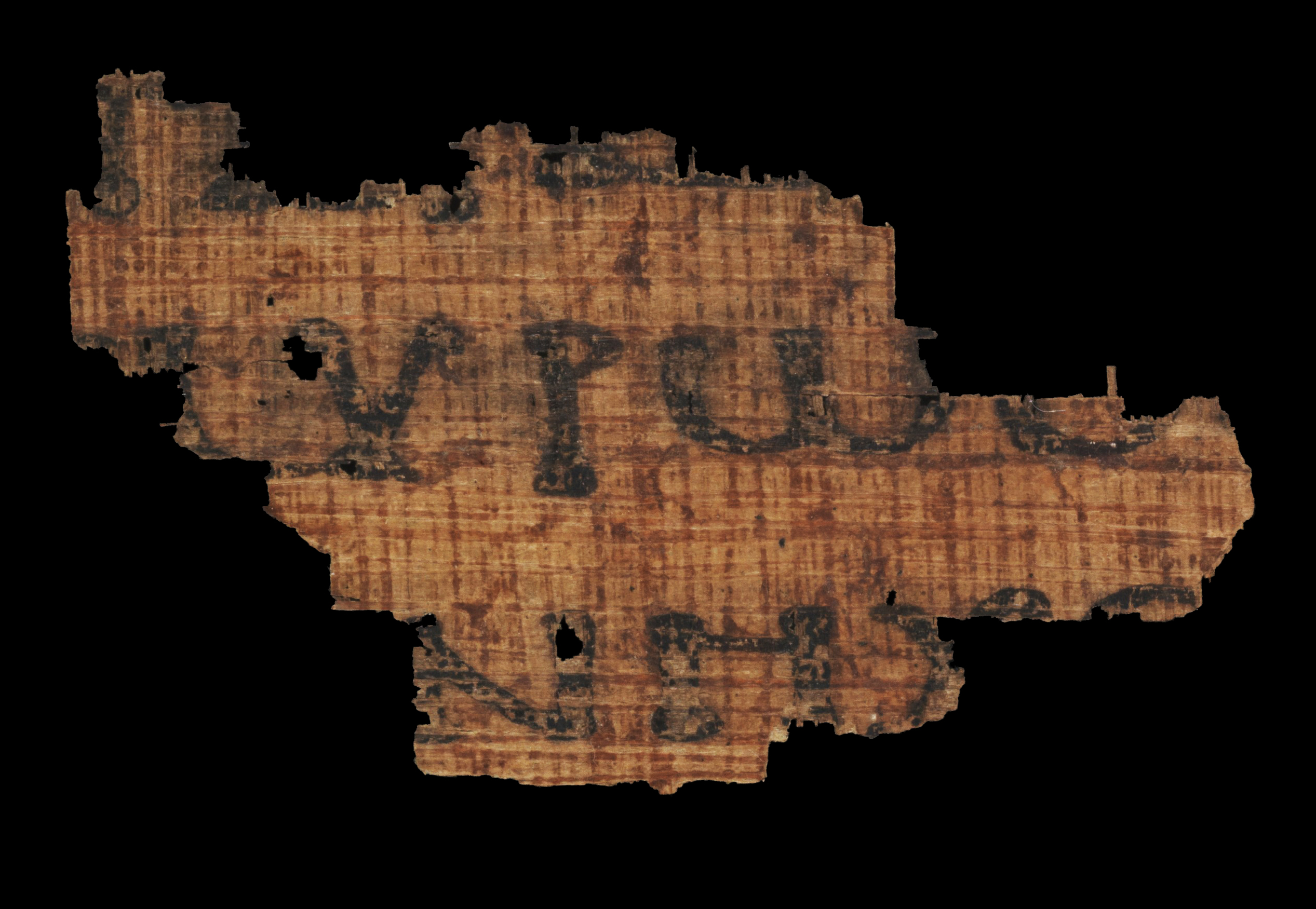
Verso, Matthew 26:2-3

The Greek text of this codex is a representative of the Byzantine text-type, but the text is too brief for certainty. Aland placed it in Category V.

It is currently housed at the Bibliotheca Bodmeriana (L) in Cologny.

== See also ==
- List of New Testament papyri
- Bodmer Papyri
