= Dishna, Egypt =

Human settlement in Egypt

Dishna ⲧⲉϣⲛⲏ
- Location within Egypt
- Coordinates: 26°07′21″N 32°28′00″E
- Country: Egypt
- Governorate: Qena
- Named for: tree garden

Area
  - Total: 211.4 km^{2} (81.6 sq mi)

Population (2023)
  - Total: 447,430
  - Density: 2,117/km^{2} (5,482/sq mi)
- Time zone: UTC+2 (EGY)
  - Summer (DST): UTC+3 (EEST)

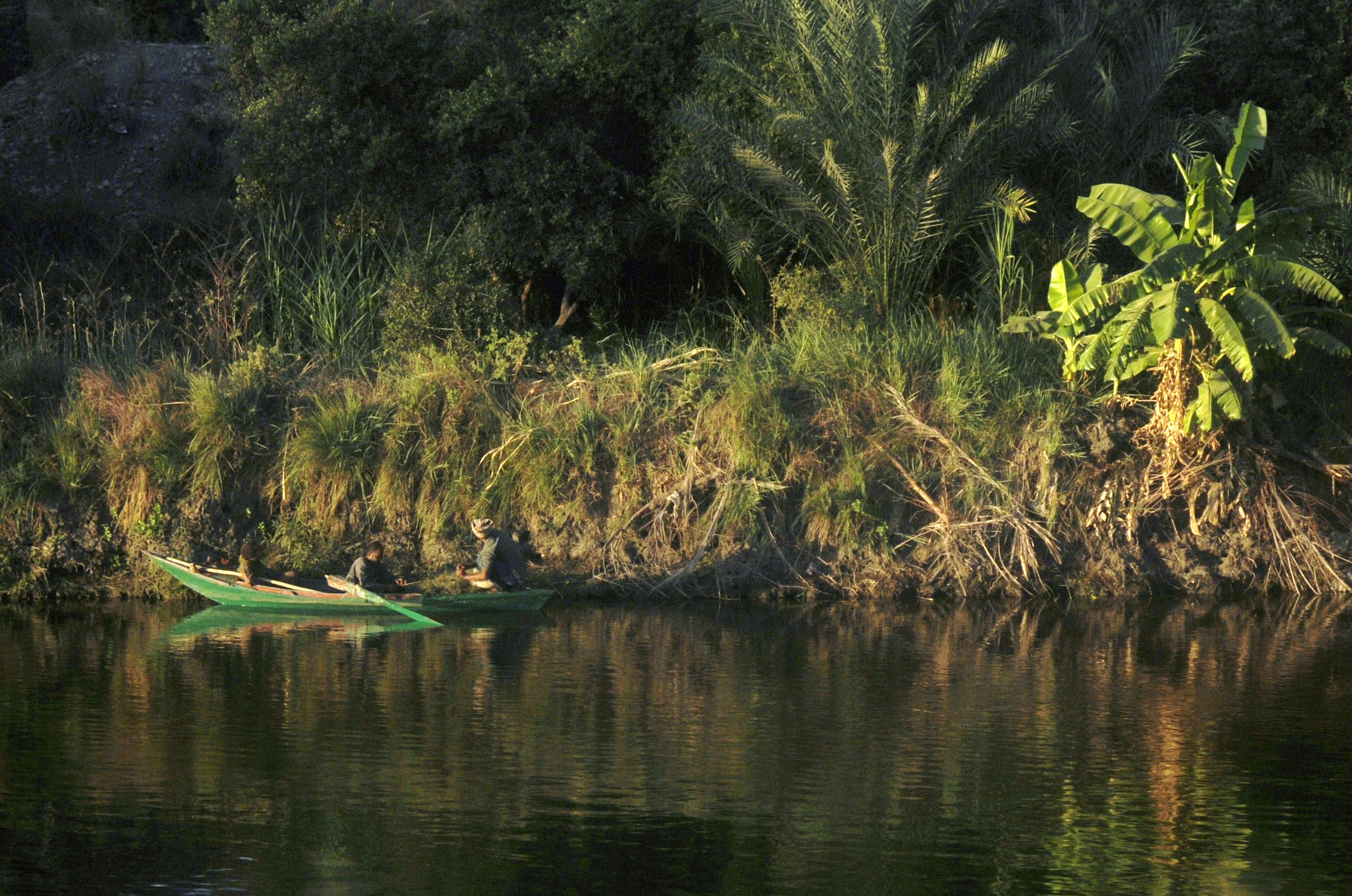
Dishna, Egypt panorama

Dishna (Arabic: دشنا, from Coptic: ⲧⲉϣⲛⲏ, lit. 'the tree garden') is a settlement west of Qena situated on the north bank of the river Nile in Qena Governorate, Egypt.

== Geography ==
Dishna is 453 km (281 mi) from Cairo.

== History ==
An expedition of the Southern University of Texas explored the Sebilian culture on the Dishna plains. The Ain Khoman tools of Oasis Baharia were identified as similar to the Esnan industry of the Dishna dated to c.12,300 B.P, differing only with respect to bifacial tools. Several sites between Wadi Kubbaniya and the plains contained assemblages also of Esnan industrial production. The Esnan industry, also known as Mesnian, employed a non-levallois technique, productions composed largely of end-scrapers, though also including a much smaller number of arch-backed bladelets and trapezoid.

== See also ==
- List of cities and towns in Egypt
- Dishna Papers
