= Campbell Bonner =

American classicist

- Born: January 30, 1876; Nashville, Tennessee, U.S.
- Died: July 11, 1954 (aged 78); Ann Arbor, Michigan, U.S.
- Spouse: Ethel Howell (m. 1903)
- Parent(s): Judge Jesse Willis & Frances Campbell B.

Academic background
- Education: Vanderbilt University (BA, MA); Harvard University (AM, PhD)
- Thesis: De Danaidibus commentatio (1900)

Academic work
- Discipline: Classical studies
- Institutions: University of Michigan

Campbell Bonner (30 January 1876 – 11 July 1954) was an American classicist notable for his research of amulets and ancient popular religion and superstitions of the late Graeco-Roman pagan and early Christian world. He was elected to the American Academy of Arts and Sciences in 1933 and the American Philosophical Society in 1938.

== Publications ==
- "The Danaid Myth," TAPA 31 (1900) 27-36
- "A Study of the Danaid Myth," HSCP 13 (1902) 129-73
- "Dionysiac Magic and the Greek Land of Cockaigne," TAPA 41 (1910) 175-85
- "The Prenuptial Rite in the Aetia of Callimachus," CP 6 (1911) 402-9
- "The Sacred Bond," TAPA 44 (1913) 233-45
- "A Papyrus Describing Magical Powers," TAPA 52 (1921) 111-8
- "A Papyrus of Dioscurides in the University of Michigan Collection," TAPA 53 (1922) 142-68
- "Traces of Thaumaturgic Technique in the Miracles," HThR 20 (1927) 171-81
- "The Numerical Value of a Magical Formula," JEA 16 (1930) 6-9
- "Note on the Paris Magical Papyrus," CP 25 (1930) 180-3
- "Demons of the Bath," in Studies Presented to F.L.C. Griffith (London, 1932): 203ff.
- "Witchcraft in the Lecture Room of Libanius," TAPA 63 (1932) 34-44
- "Liturgical Fragments on Gnostic Amulets," HThR 25 (1932) 362-7
- A Papyrus Codex of the Shepherdof Hermas (Ann Arbor, 1933)
- "A Supplement to Preisendanz' 'Amuletum Ineditum'," BNGJhb 9 (1933) 375-6
- "An Ikon of St. Demetrius," AJA 47 (1934) 63-77
- "Pallados and Jewish Reflections upon the Beginning of Man," JAOS 55 (1935) 196-9
- The Last Chapters of Enoch in Greek with the collaboration of H. C. Youtie (London & Toronto, 1937)
- "Two Curse Tablets from Beisan" with H. C. Youtie, TAPA 68 (1937) 43–77, 128
- "Some Phases of Religious Feeling in Later Paganism," HThR 30 (1937) 119-40
- "Hades and the Pomegranate Seed (Hymn to Demeter 372-4),'* CR 53 (1939) 3-4
- The Homily on the Passion by Melito, Bishop of Sardis (London & Philadelphia, 1940)
- "A New Historical Fragment," TAPA 72 (1941) 26-35
- "Two Studies in Syncretistic Amulets," PAPS 85 (1942) 466-71
- "Aeolus figured on Colic Amulets," HThR 35 (1942) 87-93
- "The Techniques of Exorcism," HThR 36 (1943) 39–49; and "Correction," HThR 37 (1944) 334ff.
- "An Obscure Inscription on a Gold Tablet," Hesperia 13 (1944) 36-55
- "The Philinna Papyrus and the Gold Tablet from the Vigna Codini," Hesperia 13 (1944) 349-51
- Studies in Magical Amulets, Chiefly Graeco-Egyptian (Ann Arbor, 1950)
- "A Reminiscence of Paul on a Coin Amulet," HThR 43 (1950) 165-8
- "Amulets Chiefly in the British Museum," Hesperia 20 (1951) 301-45
- "A Magical Inscription on a Chalcedony," with H. C. Youtie, TAPA 84 (1953) 60-6
- "Two Notes," JEA 40 (1954) 15-8
- "A Miscellany of Engraved Stones," Hesperia 23 (1954) 138-57 and plates 34-6
- "A Note on Method in the Treatment of Magical Inscriptions," AJP 75 (1954) 303–5.
