= Martin Schøyen =

Norwegian businessman

Martin Schøyen (born January 31, 1940) is a Norwegian businessman, traveller, historian, paleographer and collector of books.

He started collecting books in 1955. Currently his private collection, the Schøyen Collection, contains more than 13,000 manuscript items, the oldest book is about 5,000 years old.

In 2012 he was forced to sell 60 manuscripts at Sothebys because of the Norwegian wealth tax. In 2024 further sales took place.

== Some manuscripts ==
- Biblical manuscript in Coptic language, dated to the 3rd century.
- 15 Dead Sea Scrolls
- Sumerian text from the 21st century B.C.; Ur-Nammu's law-code
- Babylonian calendar from 2000–1600 B.C.
- Tutankhamun's signet ring
- MS 5236, an ancient Greek block print dating to the 6th century BC
