= Bodmer Library =

Museum of rare manuscripts in Cologny, Switzerland

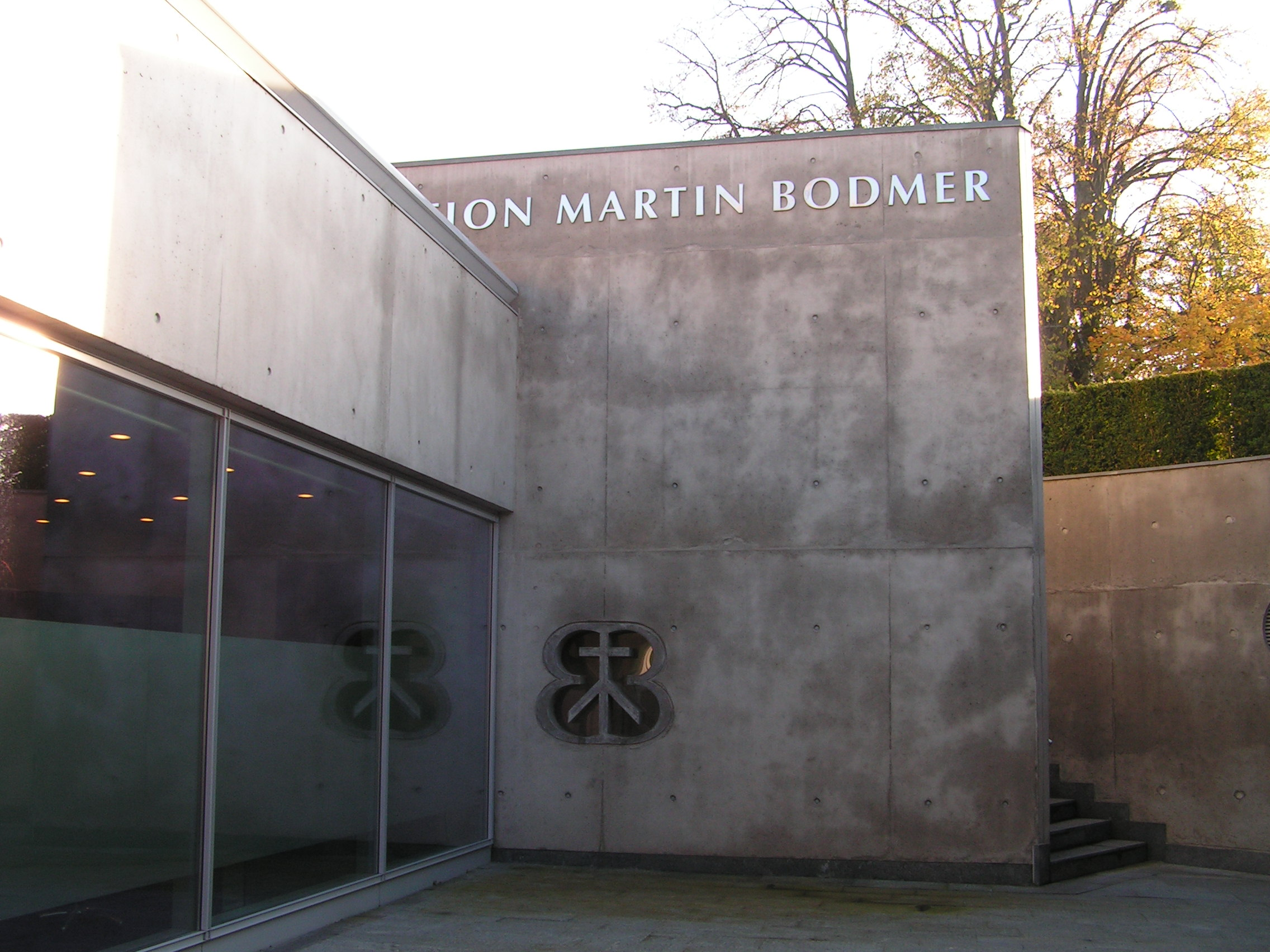
- 46°12′55″N 6°10′50″E
- Established: 1971

Other information
- Website: Official website

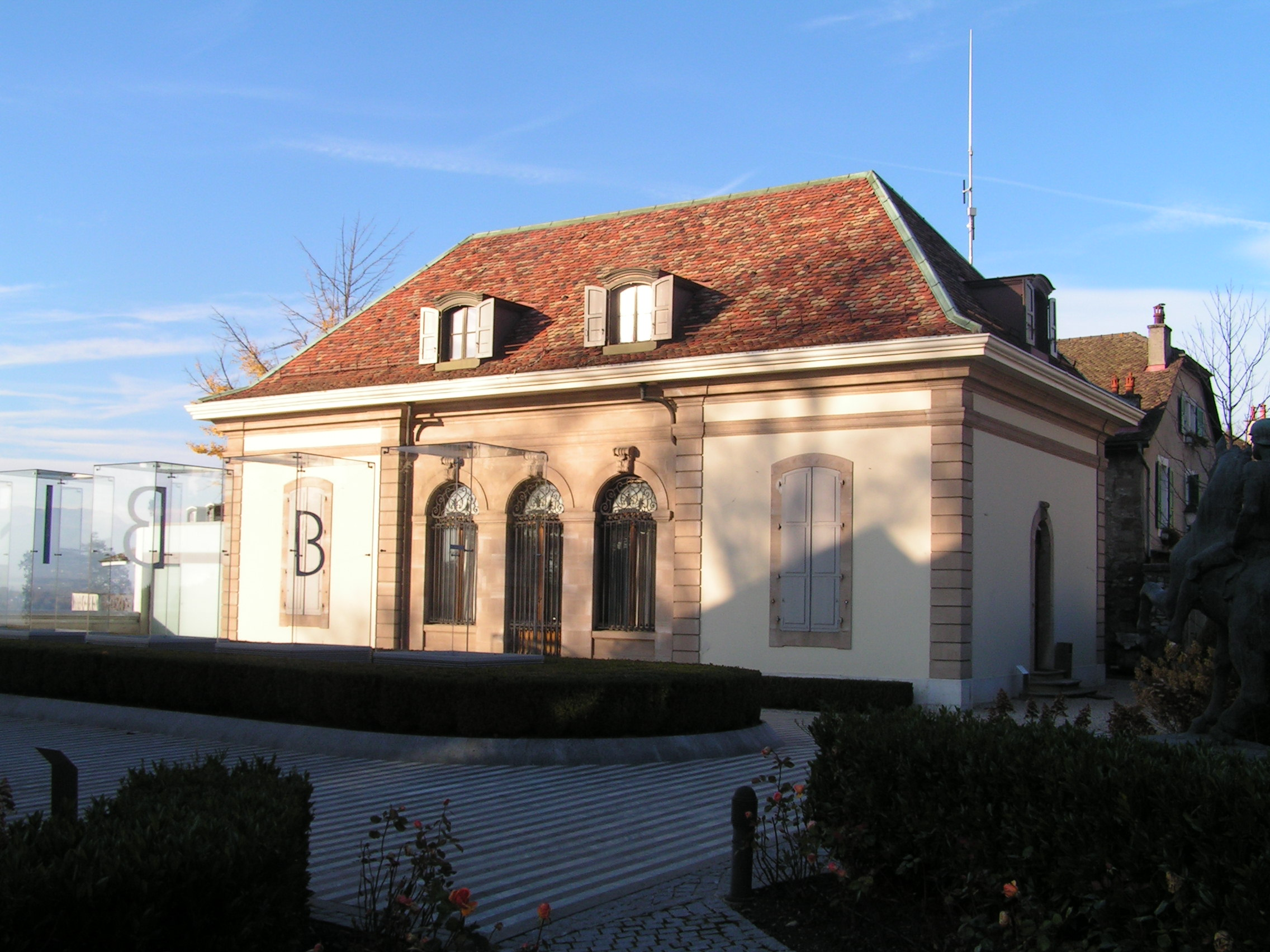
Partial view of the Bodmer Foundation (Cologny, Switzerland).

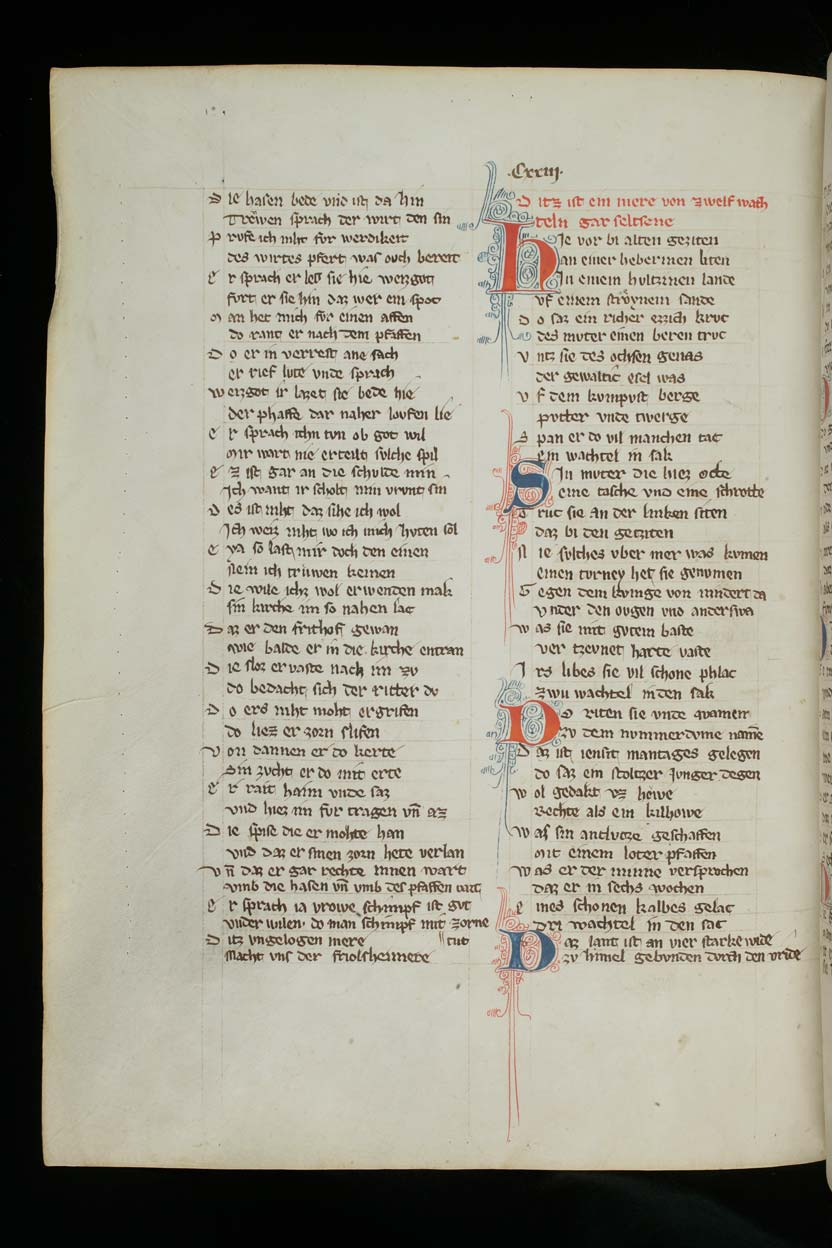
Example of a 14th-century precious book of the foundation.

The Bodmer Foundation (French: Fondation Bodmer) is a library and museum specialised in manuscripts and precious editions. It is located in Cologny, Switzerland just outside Geneva.

Also known as Bibliotheca Bodmeriana (or Bodmer Library), it is a Swiss heritage site of national significance. The library was established by Martin Bodmer and is famous as the home of the Bodmer Papyri. Some of these papyri are among the oldest remaining copies of the New Testament. Some manuscripts are written in Greek, others in Coptic (e.g. Papyrus Bodmer III). The first of the manuscripts was purchased in 1956 (Papyrus Bodmer II — P^{66}). It also houses a copy of the Gutenberg Bible.

== History ==
Martin Bodmer established the library in the 1920s. Bodmer selected the works centering on what he saw as the five pillars of world literature: the Bible, Homer, Dante Alighieri, William Shakespeare and Johann Wolfgang von Goethe. He prioritized autographs and first editions. 1951 Bodmer had built two neo-baroque houses in Cologny to accommodate the collection.

In 1970, shortly before Bodmer's death, the Bodmer Foundation was established to make the collection accessible and conserve it. In 2003 the building was remodelled by Mario Botta. He connected the cellars of the two houses by a two-story underground structure, pierced by light shafts.

== Items ==
The collection comprises some 160,000 items, including Sumerian clay tablets, Greek papyri and handwritten originals including music sheets. He aimed at representing the historical context by adding political, philosophical and scientific items. Some samples are:

- Oldest surviving copy of the Gospel of James
- A Gutenberg Bible, 1452
- First-edition print of Martin Luther's Ninety-Five Theses, 1517
- A copy of Newton's Philosophiæ Naturalis Principia Mathematica once owned by Gottfried Leibniz
- Gotthold Ephraim Lessing's draft manuscript of Nathan the Wise, 1778
- Papyrus 66 (near-complete codex of the Gospel of John), Papyrus 73 and Papyrus 74 (Acts and Catholic epistles)
- Minuscule 556 (12th-century Greek manuscript of the New Testament)
- A copy of Shakespeare's First Folio, 1623, in its original binding. Digitised by The Bodmer Lab, this copy is available online

== Photos ==
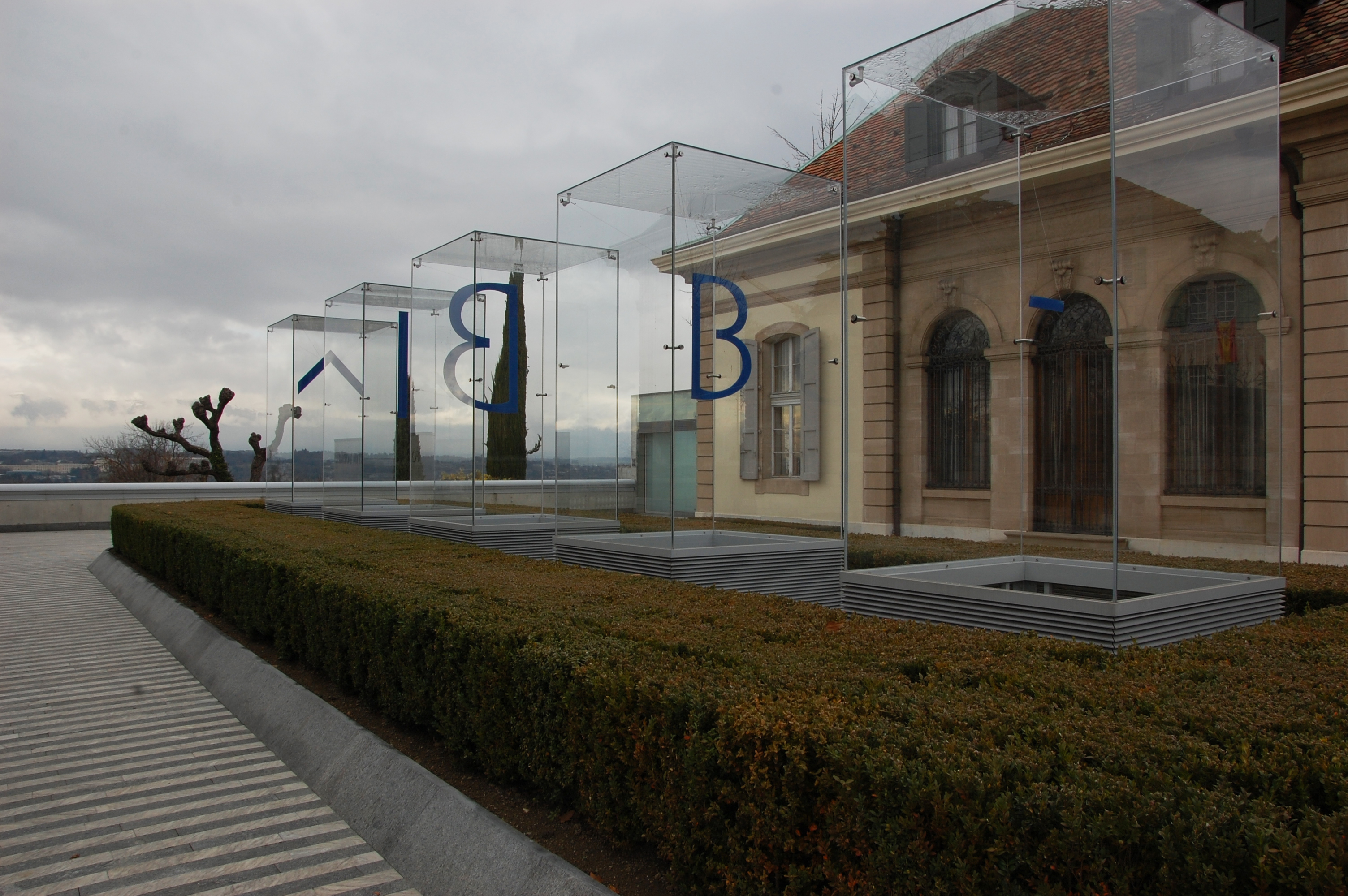

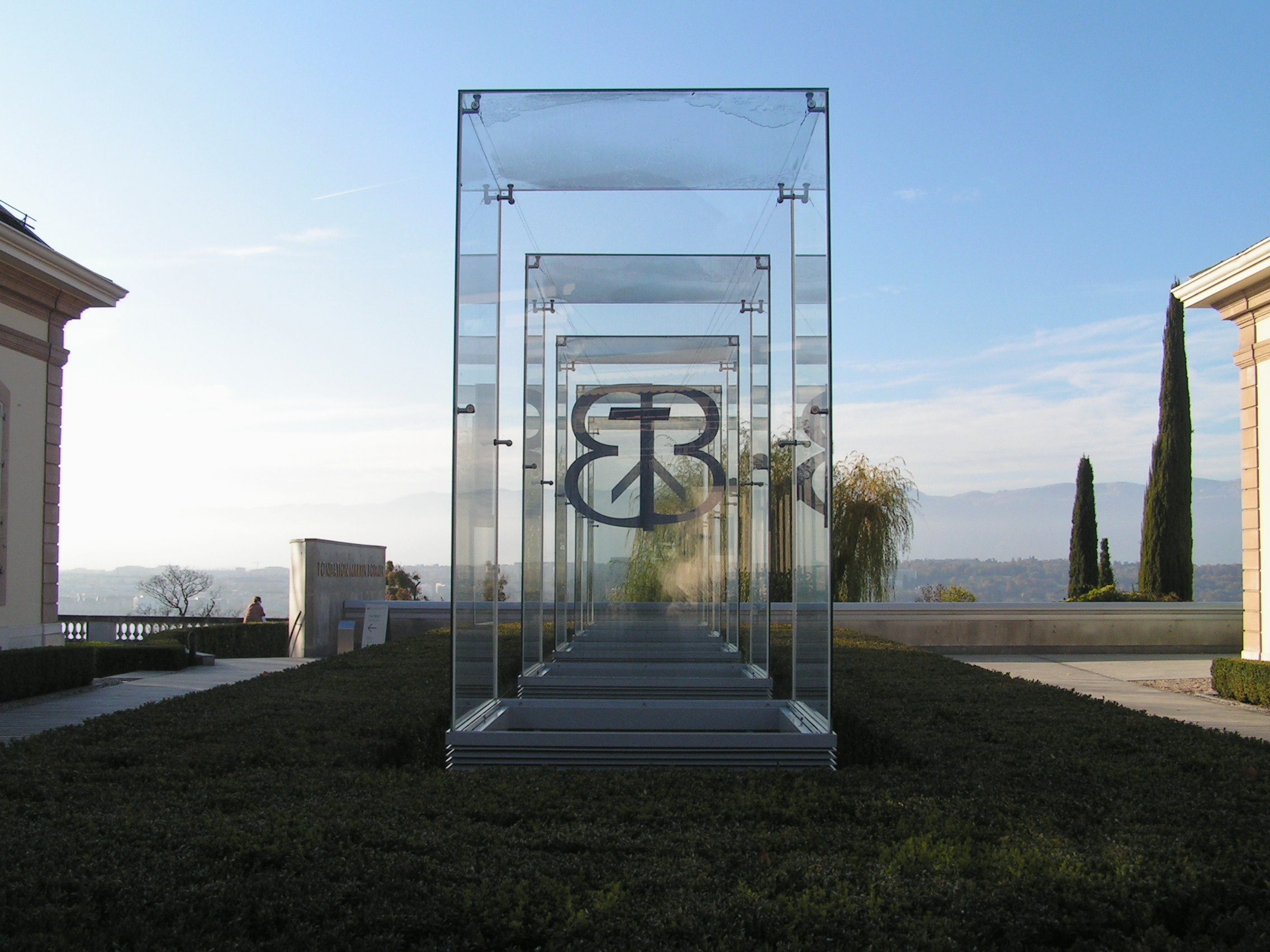

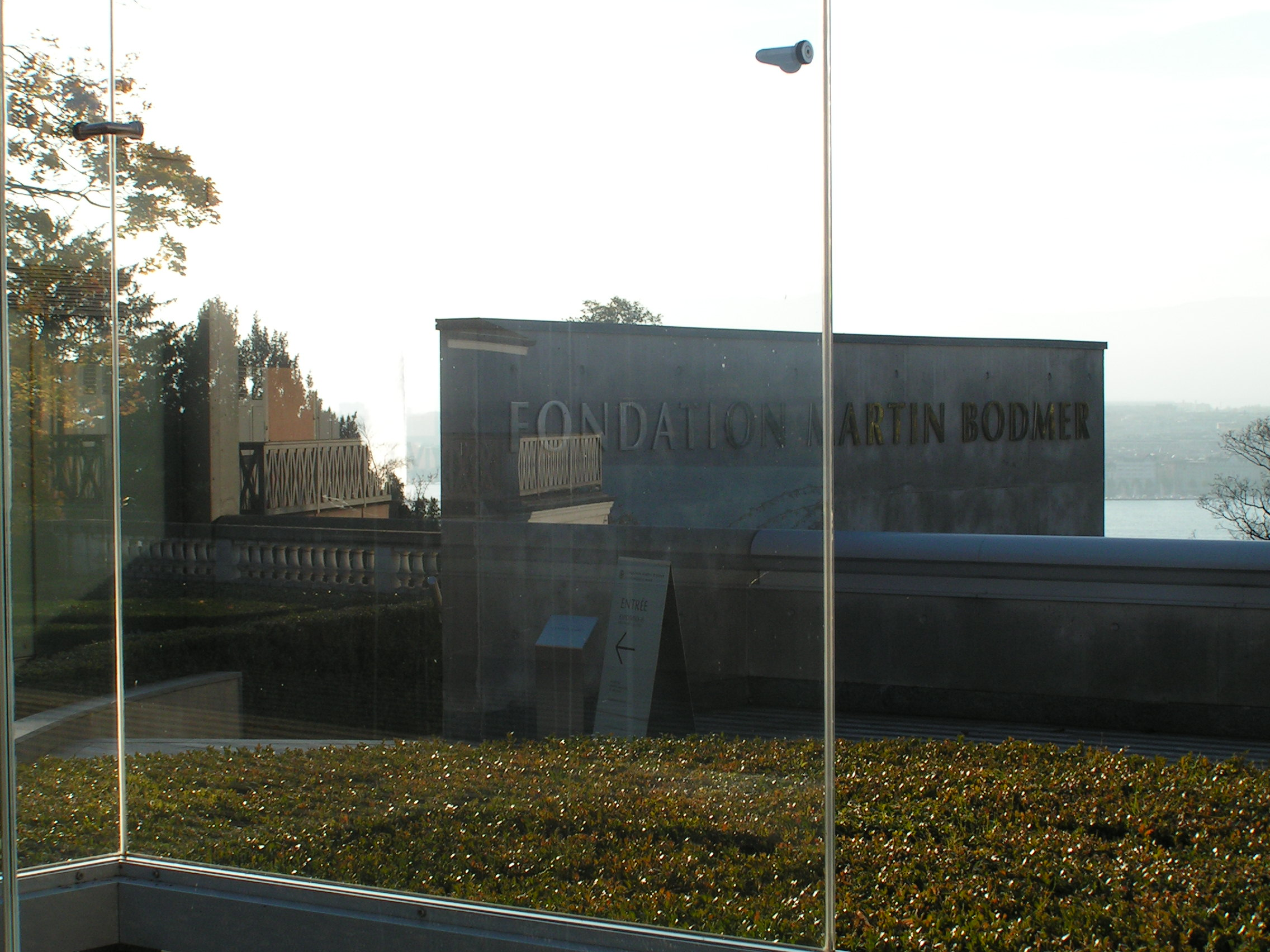

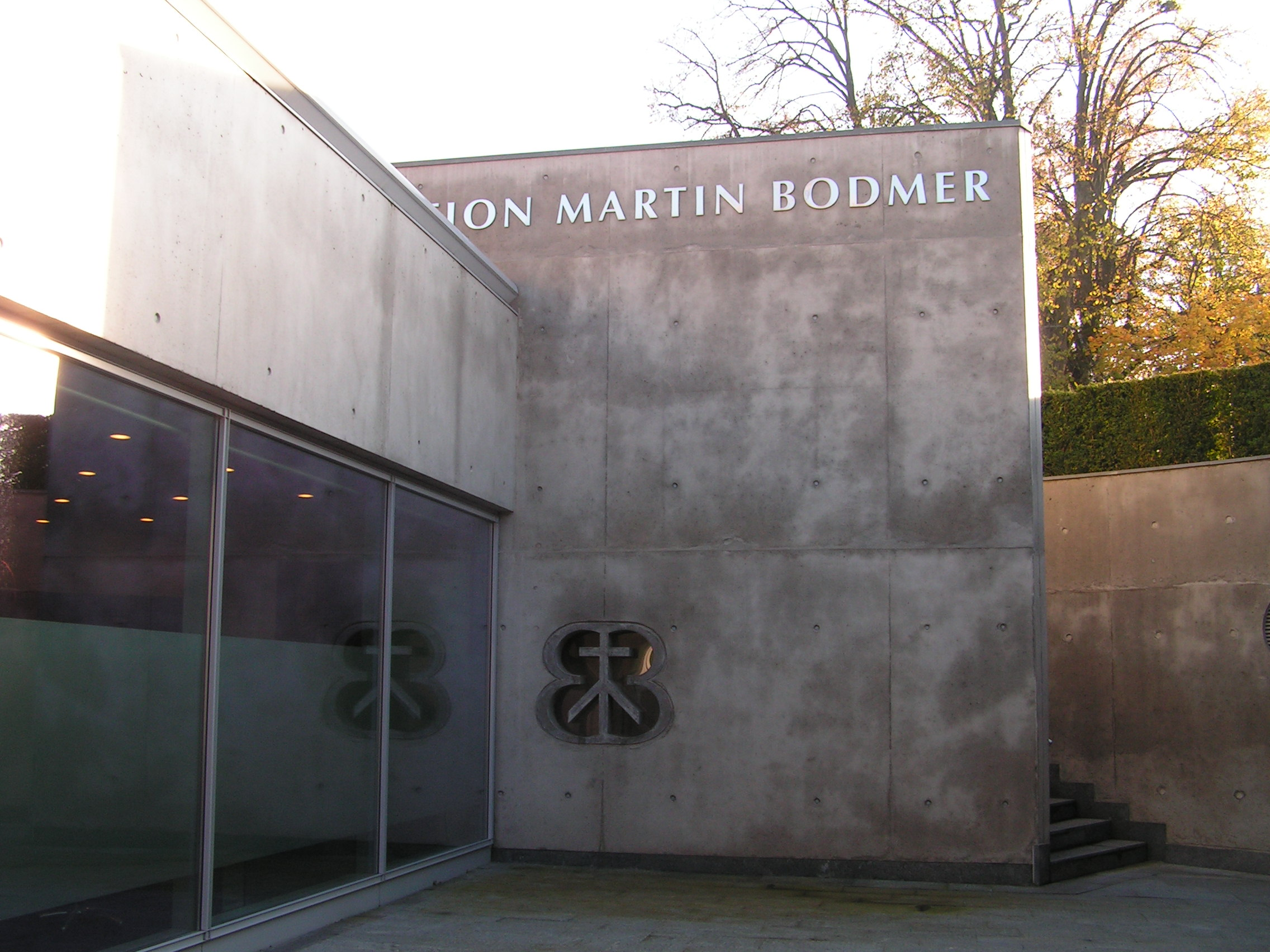

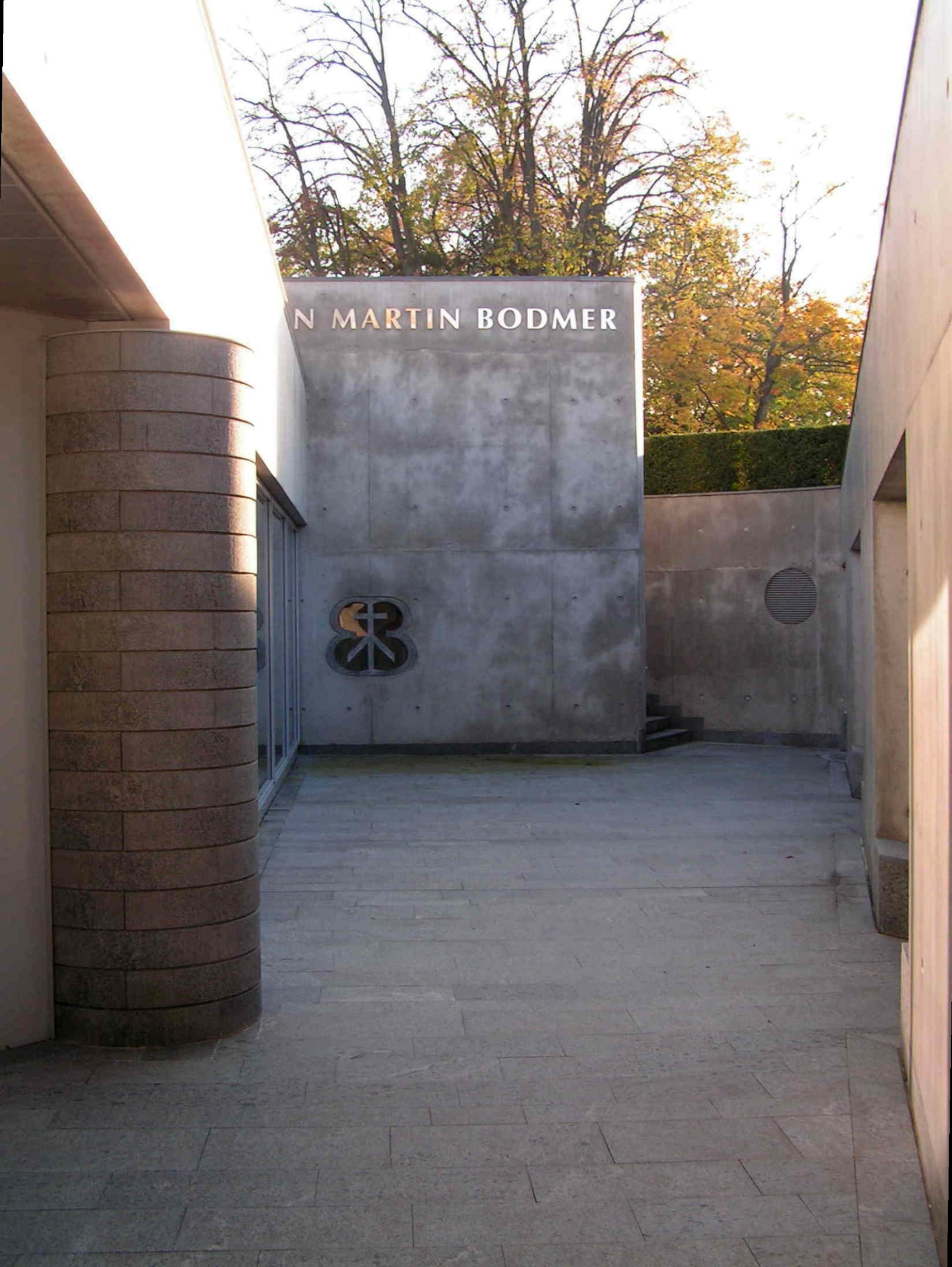
Entrance of the museum

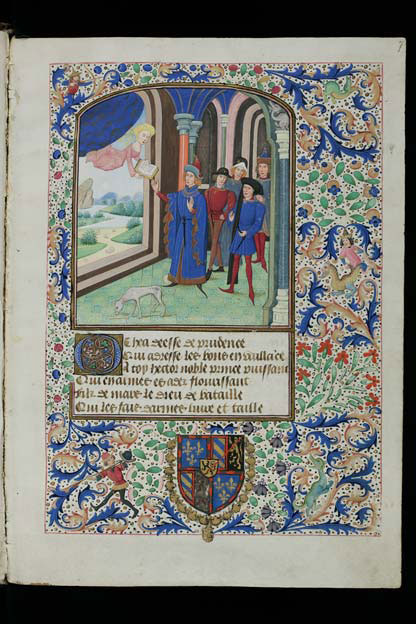

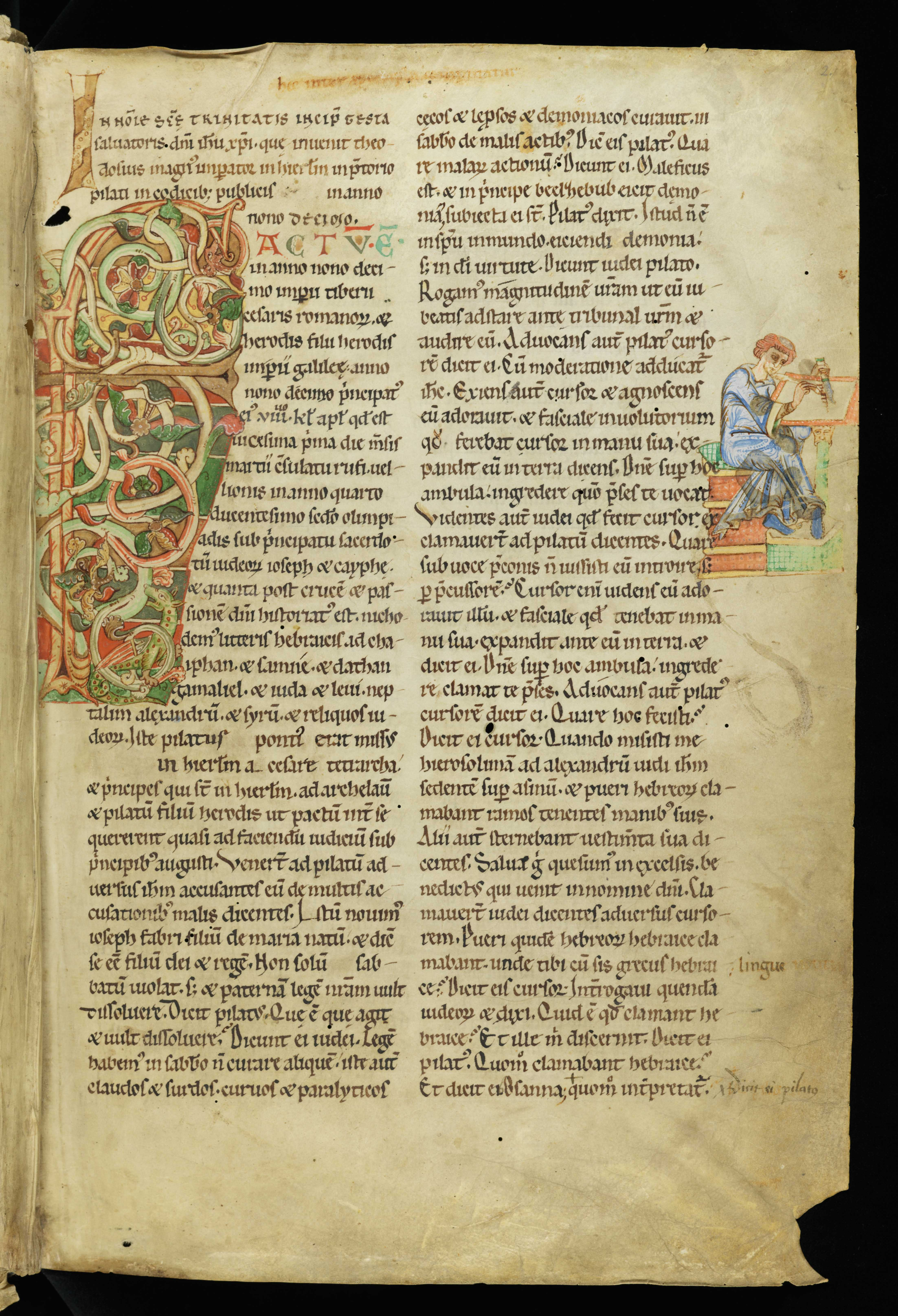

== Bibliography ==
- Stella Ghervas, "Manuscrits russes dans la Bibliotheca Bodmeriana," Corona Nova, t. II. München, K.G. Saur Verlag, 2003, 101–126.
