= 2 Peter 3 =

- ← chapter 2 1 John 1 →
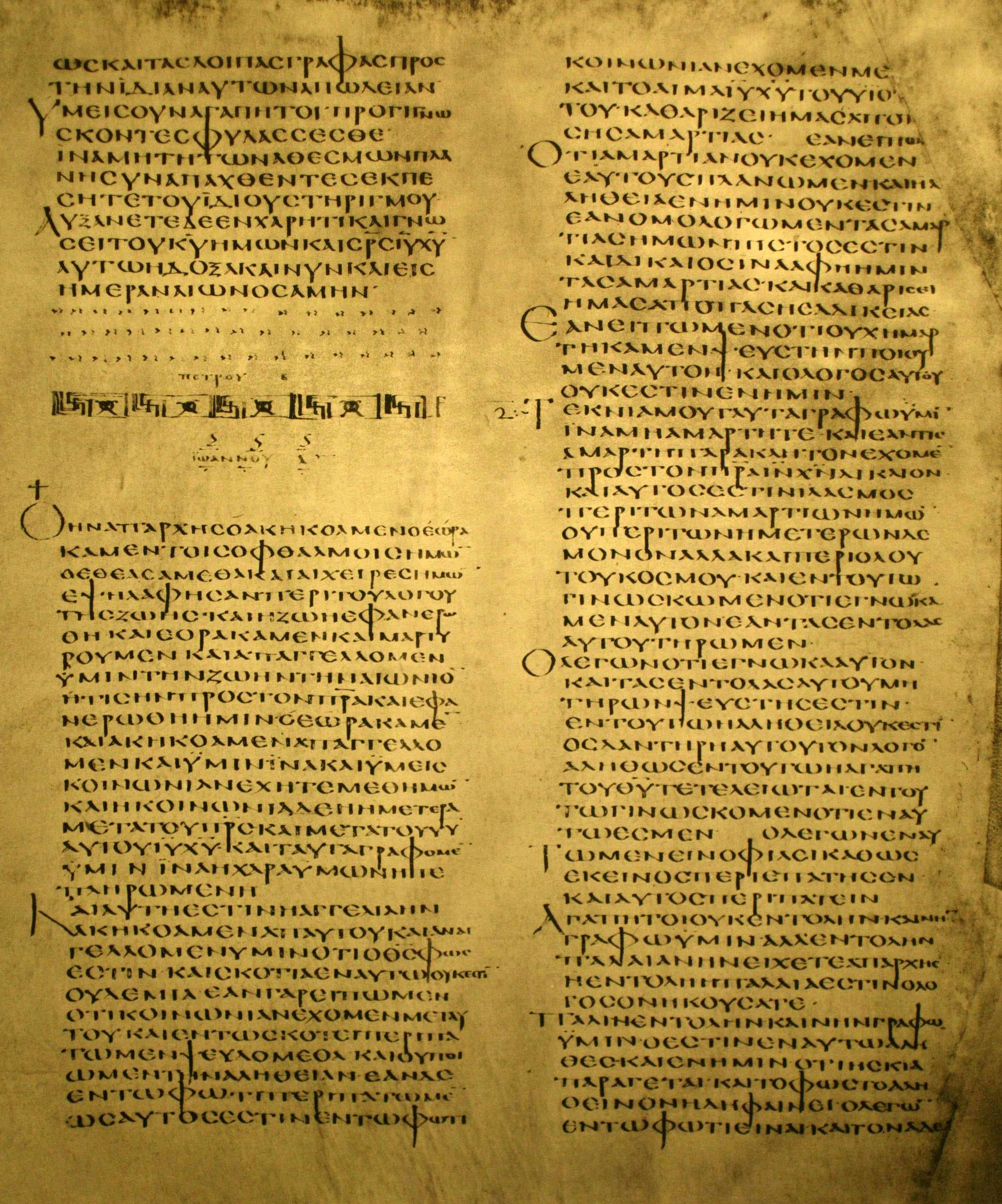
- The end part of the Second Epistle of Peter (3:16-18) and the beginning of the First Epistle of John (1:1-2:9) on the same page of Codex Alexandrinus (AD 400–440).
- Book: Second Epistle of Peter
- Category: General epistles
- Christian Bible part: New Testament
- Order in the Christian part: 22

2 Peter 3 is the third (and final) chapter of the Second Epistle of Peter in the New Testament of the Christian Bible. The author identifies himself as "Simon Peter, a bondservant and apostle of Jesus Christ". The epistle is traditionally attributed to Peter the Apostle, but some scholars consider it to be a work of Peter's followers, written between 60 and 90 CE.

== Text ==
The original text was written in Koine Greek. This chapter is divided into 18 verses.

=== Textual witnesses ===
Some early manuscripts containing the text of this chapter are:

- Papyrus 72 (3rd/4th century)
- Codex Vaticanus (325–350)
- Codex Sinaiticus (330–360)
- Codex Alexandrinus (400–440)
- Codex Ephraemi Rescriptus (ca. 450; complete)
- Papyrus 74 (7th century; extant verses 4,11,16)

=== Old Testament references ===
- 2 Peter 3:6: Genesis 7:11–12
- 2 Peter 3:8: Psalm 90:4

=== Relationship with the Epistle of Jude ===
There is an obvious relationship between the texts of 2 Peter and the Epistle of Jude. Comparing the Greek text portions of 2 Peter 2:1–3:3 (426 words) to Jude 4–18 (311 words) results in 80 words in common and 7 words of substituted synonyms.

The shared passages are:

2 Peter	Jude
1:5	3
1:12	5
2:1	4
2:4	6
2:6	7
2:10–11	8–9
2:12	10
2:13–17	11–13
3:2-3	17–18
3:14	24
3:18	25

== A reminder of the coming of the Lord (3:1–13) ==
2 Peter 3:1-2 reminds the addressees about the writer to re-emphasize the epistle's authority before the exposition of the central issue in verses 3–13, the timing of Jesus' second coming.

=== Verse 1 ===
Beloved, I now write to you this second epistle (in both of which I stir up your pure minds by way of reminder),

Peter emphasizes the unity of this epistle with the first one and the consistency of his teaching with those of the prophets and apostles (verse 2). Hugo Grotius (1583–1645) suggested that these are the opening words of a new letter, rather than a reference to an earlier one.

=== Verse 2 ===
that you may be mindful of the words which were spoken before by the holy prophets, and of the commandment of us, the apostles of the Lord and Savior,

Here Peter emphasizes the unity of the writings of the prophets in the Old Testament with the apostolic teachings in 1 Peter 1:10–12 and 2 Peter 1:19–21. A reading των αποστολων ημων εντολης (tōn apostolōn hēmōn entolēs) is given in the Textus Receptus, and this is described by Heinrich Meyer as (in his day) "the commonly accepted reading", whereas των αποστολων υμων εντολης (tōn apostolōn hymōn entolēs) is preferred in the Westcott-Hort critical text. Meyer calls the latter version "the true reading". Accordingly, some English translations refer to "the command given through your apostles" (e.g. Revised Standard Version, New International Version) or others to "the commandment of us, the apostles ..." (e.g. King James Version and New King James Version).

=== Verse 3 ===
Knowing this first, that there shall come in the last days scoffers, walking after their own lusts,

- Cross reference: Jude 18
- "Walking after their own lusts" (NRSV: "indulging their own lusts"): doing as one pleases by thinking that there is no judgment.

=== Verse 4 ===
And saying, Where is the promise of his coming? for since the fathers fell asleep, all things continue as they were from the beginning of the creation.

- "The fathers": The reference to Noah's flood in verses 5–6 indicates that they are likely the Old Testament patriarchs.

=== Verses 5–6 ===
^{5}For this they willingly are ignorant of, that by the word of God the heavens were of old, and the earth standing out of the water and in the water: ^{6} Whereby the world that then was, being overflowed with water, perished:

- "Willingly ignorant" (KJV; NKJV: "willfully forget"; NRSV: "deliberately ignore"): 'conveniently forgotten' that God had intervened in judgment at the time of Noah's flood.

=== Verse 8 ===
But, beloved, do not forget this one thing, that with the Lord one day is as a thousand years, and a thousand years as one day.

- "With the Lord one day is as a thousand years" indicates that God's perspective on time is very different from men's (cf. Psalm 90:4; Jubilees 4:30; Sirach 18:9-11; 2 Apoc. Bar. 48.12-13; Ps.-Philo, Bib. Ant. 19.13); and any 'delay' is the result of God's mercy to give time for repentance (cf. Romans 2:4; 2 Esd 7:33; Plut. Mor. 549b; perhaps Mark 13:10; also Habakkuk 2:3).

=== Verse 9 ===
The Lord is not slack concerning His promise, as some count slackness, but is longsuffering toward us, not willing that any should perish but that all should come to repentance.

The Lord is not "slack" (Greek: οὐ βραδύνει, ou bradunei), literally meaning the Lord does not delay or loiter. The same word is used in 1 Timothy 3:15 in reference to Paul's possible delay in travelling to meet Timothy in Ephesus. Marvin Vincent sees here "besides delay, the idea of lateness with reference to an appointed time".

== Peroratio (3:14–18) ==
The final five verses of the epistle contain the concluding part (peroratio) of the discourse, starting with the phrase: "Therefore, beloved" (verse 14, and used again in verse 17) and continue with a tone similar to the opening in the first chapter, echoing the 2 Peter 1:1–2 ('grace, knowledge, and Jesus as Savior') with the final words ('day of eternity') as the last reminder of this epistle's major theme, that is, 'the judgment day will come'.

=== Verses 15–16 ===
^{15}and consider that the longsuffering of our Lord is salvation—as also our beloved brother Paul, according to the wisdom given to him, has written to you, ^{16}as also in all his epistles, speaking in them of these things, in which are some things hard to understand, which untaught and unstable people twist to their own destruction, as they do also the rest of the Scriptures.

- "The longsuffering of our Lord": or "God's patience", in the sense of 'giving time for unbelievers to be saved and for believers to be working out their salvation'.

The reference to "all his epistles" indicates that the community of believers had started to gather Paul's epistles, although it need not imply that the collection was already complete.

== See also ==
- Jesus Christ
- Genesis flood narrative
- Paul the Apostle
- Related Bible parts: Genesis 6, Genesis 7, Psalm 24, Psalm 90

== Sources ==
- Callan, Terrance (2004). "Use of the Letter of Jude by the Second Letter of Peter". Biblica. 85: 42–64.
- Coogan, Michael David (2007). Coogan, Michael David; Brettler, Marc Zvi; Newsom, Carol Ann; Perkins, Pheme (eds.). The New Oxford Annotated Bible with the Apocryphal/Deuterocanonical Books: New Revised Standard Version, Issue 48 (Augmented 3rd ed.). Oxford University Press. ISBN 9780195288810.
- Duff, Jeremy (2007). "78. 2 Peter". In Barton, John; Muddiman, John (eds.). The Oxford Bible Commentary (first (paperback) ed.). Oxford University Press. pp. 1270–1274. ISBN 978-0199277186.
- Robinson, Alexandra (2017). Jude on the Attack: A Comparative Analysis of the Epistle of Jude, Jewish Judgement Oracles, and Greco-Roman Invective. The Library of New Testament Studies. Bloomsbury Publishing. ISBN 978-0567678799.
- Wheaton, David H. (1994). "2 Peter". In Carson, D. A.; France, R. T.; Motyer, J. A.; Wenham, G. J. (eds.). New Bible Commentary: 21st Century Edition (4, illustrated, reprint, revised ed.). Inter-Varsity Press. pp. 1386–1396. ISBN 9780851106489.
