= 2 Peter 2 =

- ← chapter 1 chapter 3 →
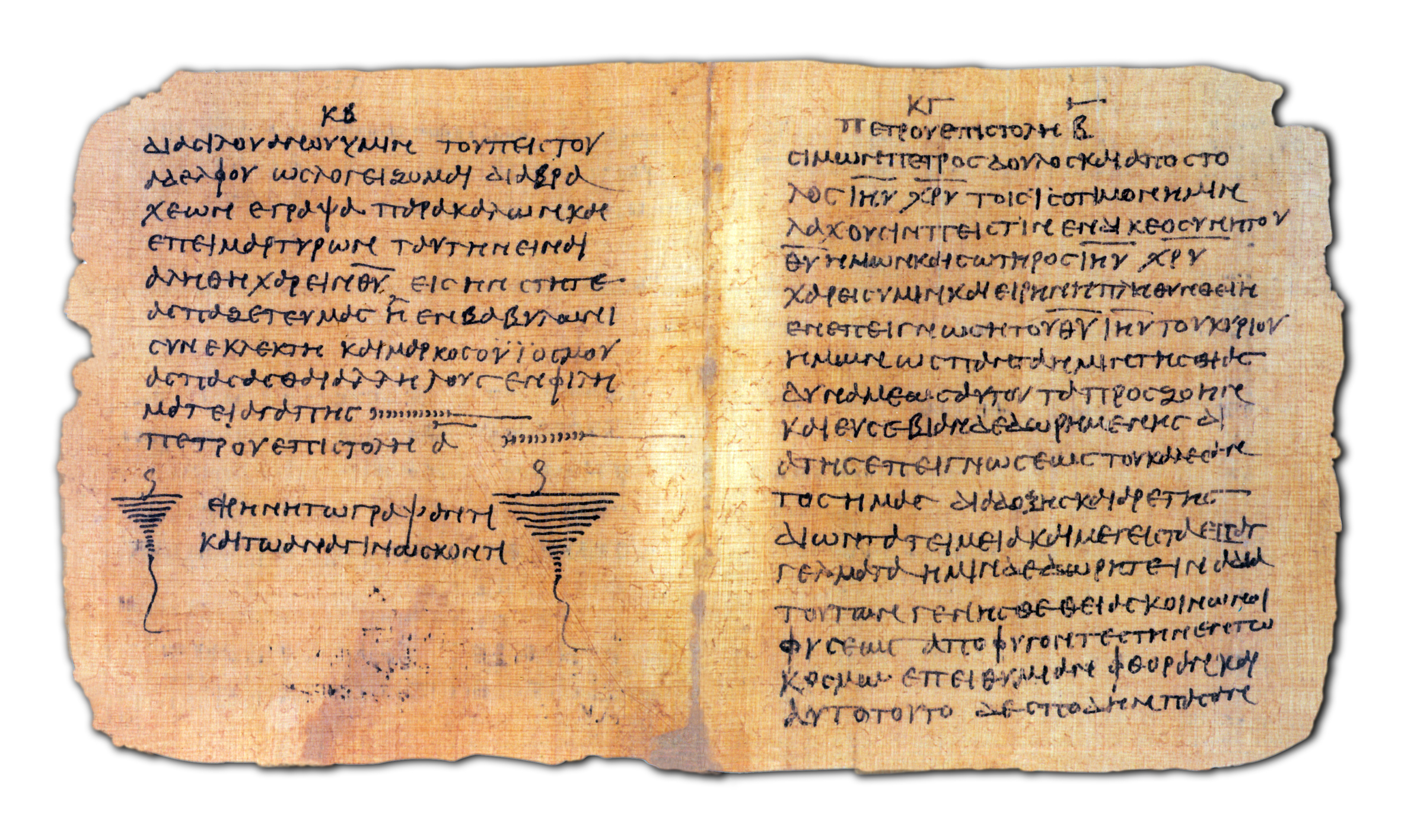
- 1 Peter 5:12–end and 2 Peter 1:1–5 on facing pages of Papyrus 72 (3rd/4th century)
- Book: Second Epistle of Peter
- Category: General epistles
- Christian Bible part: New Testament
- Order in the Christian part: 22

2 Peter 2 is the second chapter of the Second Epistle of Peter in the New Testament of the Christian Bible. The author identifies himself as "Simon Peter, a bondservant and apostle of Jesus Christ" and the epistle is traditionally attributed to Peter the Apostle, but some writers argue that it is the work of Peter's followers in Rome between the years 70 and 100.

== Text ==
The original text was written in Koine Greek. This chapter is divided into 22 verses.

=== Textual witnesses ===
Some early manuscripts containing the text of this chapter are:

Greek

- Papyrus 72 (3rd/4th century)
- Codex Vaticanus (B or 03; 325–350)
- Codex Sinaiticus (א or 01; 330–360)
- Codex Alexandrinus (A or 02; 400–440)
- Codex Ephraemi Rescriptus (C or 04; c. 450; complete)

Latin

- Codex Floriacensis (h; 6th century Old-Latin; extant verses 1–6)

=== Old Testament references ===
- 2 Peter 2:4-5, a "carefully crafted set of ... examples of God's historical judgments, draws on Genesis' account of Noah and the flood (Genesis 6:17-18), the destruction of Sodom and Gomorrah (Genesis 19), and the survival of Lot (Genesis 19:15ff).
- 2 Peter 2:22: Proverbs 26:11

=== Relationship with the Epistle of Jude ===
There is an obvious relationship between the texts of 2 Peter and the Epistle of Jude. Comparing the Greek text portions of 2 Peter 2:1–3:3 (426 words) to Jude 4–18 (311 words) results in 80 words in common and 7 words of substituted synonyms.

The shared passages are:

2 Peter	Jude
1:5	3
1:12	5
2:1	4
2:4	6
2:6	7
2:10–11	8–9
2:12	10
2:13–17	11–13
3:2-3	17–18
3:14	24
3:18	25

== Structure ==
This chapter is concerned with false prophets. Duff sees the chapter as a unit, presenting the author's case against "false teachers" following on from a defence of true teaching in the first chapter. The New King James Version highlights sections dealing with false teachers in terms of their "doom" (verses 4–11), their "depravity" (verses 12–17) and their "deceptions" (verses 18–22). Several versions break verse 10 into two parts, beginning a new paragraph part-way through the verse. The Jerusalem Bible breaks the chapter at verse 10b, dealing firstly with false teachers (verses 1-10a) and then with "the punishment to come" for "such self-willed people" (verses 10b-22).

== The danger and condemnation of false prophets (2:1–10a) ==
"False prophets" are dangerous due to three reasons:

- 'their method is underhand', leading to shameful ways and 'bringing the faith into disrepute'.
- 'their teaching is a complete denial of the truth'
- 'their destiny is to bring destruction' – to themselves and their followers as well.

=== Verse 1 ===
But there were also false prophets among the people, even as there will be false teachers among you, who will secretly bring in destructive heresies, even denying the Lord who bought them, and bring on themselves swift destruction.

The activities of the "false prophets" (Ancient Greek: ψευδοπροφῆται, pseudoprophētai) among the people in the Old Testament period are listed in Deuteronomy 13:1–15; 1 Kings 13:18; 22:5–23; Jeremiah 5:13, 31; 6:13.

- "Heresies": is from Greek word αἱρέσεις, haireseis, meaning "chosen beliefs", but used in Christianity for "'a wrong belief deliberately chosen' instead of 'the right belief revealed by God'".

== The character of false prophets (2:10b–22) ==
The dangerous influence of the false prophets is emphasized by more fully describing their true nature: they are insolent (verses 10–12), licentious (verse 13), immoral (verse 14) and greedy (verses 14b–16). They ought to be condemned for the following three reasons:

- their seemingly attractive offer, which is actually without substance (verse 17)
- their approach using 'the lever of sensual pleasure' to lure people to the ways of the world (verse 18)
- their total deception to offer 'freedom' which actually only leads to the bondage of sin (verse 19).

=== Verse 14 ===
With eyes full of adultery, they never stop sinning; they seduce the unstable; they are experts in greed — an accursed brood!

"Eyes full of adultery" is a translation of words which more literally mean "full of an adulteress".

=== Verse 19 ===
While they promise them liberty, they themselves are slaves of corruption; for by whom a person is overcome, by him also he is brought into bondage.

The false prophets/false teachers offer freedom from the obligation to serve Christ and to grow in Christ (cf. 2 Peter 1:3–11), yet, in doing so, bringing the people, and also themselves, into 'the bondage of sin all over again' (cf. John 8:31–36 and Romans 6).

=== Verse 22 ===
But it is happened unto them according to the true proverb, The dog is turned to his own vomit again; and the sow that was washed to her wallowing in the mire.

Citing: Proverbs 26:11.

== See also ==
- Balaam
- Jesus Christ
- Lot
- Noah
- Sodom and Gomorrah
- Related Bible parts: Genesis 6, Genesis 19, Numbers 22, Proverbs 26, Matthew 24, 1 Timothy 4, 2 Timothy 3

== Sources ==
- Callan, Terrance (2004). "Use of the Letter of Jude by the Second Letter of Peter". Biblica. 85: 42–64.
- Duff, Jeremy (2007). "78. 2 Peter". In Barton, John; Muddiman, John (eds.). The Oxford Bible Commentary (first (paperback) ed.). Oxford University Press. pp. 1270–1274. ISBN 978-0199277186.
- Robinson, Alexandra (2017). Jude on the Attack: A Comparative Analysis of the Epistle of Jude, Jewish Judgement Oracles, and Greco-Roman Invective. The Library of New Testament Studies. Bloomsbury Publishing. ISBN 978-0567678799.
- Wheaton, David H. (1994). "2 Peter". In Carson, D. A.; France, R. T.; Motyer, J. A.; Wenham, G. J. (eds.). New Bible Commentary: 21st Century Edition (4, illustrated, reprint, revised ed.). Inter-Varsity Press. pp. 1386–1396. ISBN 9780851106489.
