= Textual variants in the Epistle of Jude =

Textual variants in the Epistle of Jude are the subject of textual criticism of the New Testament. Textual variants in manuscripts arise when a copyist makes deliberate or inadvertent alterations to a text that is being reproduced. An abbreviated list of textual variants in this particular book is given in this article below.

Most of the variations are not significant and some common alterations include the deletion, rearrangement, repetition, or replacement of one or more words when the copyist's eye returns to a similar word in the wrong location of the original text. If their eye skips to an earlier word, they may create a repetition (error of dittography). If their eye skips to a later word, they may create an omission. They may resort to performing a rearranging of words to retain the overall meaning without compromising the context. In other instances, the copyist may add text from memory from a similar or parallel text in another location. Otherwise, they may also replace some text of the original with an alternative reading. Spellings occasionally change. Synonyms may be substituted. A pronoun may be changed into a proper noun (such as "he said" becoming "Jesus said"). John Mill's 1707 Greek New Testament was estimated to contain some 30,000 variants in its accompanying textual apparatus which was based on "nearly 100 [Greek] manuscripts." Peter J. Gurry puts the number of non-spelling variants among New Testament manuscripts around 500,000, though he acknowledges his estimate is higher than all previous ones.

== Legend ==
A guide to the sigla (symbols and abbreviations) most frequently used in the body of this article.

General sigla
# beginning with 0: uncial
# not beginning with 0: minuscule
^{*} superscript: original reading
^{c} superscript: scribal correction
^{ms} superscript: individual manuscript
^{mss} superscript: multiple manuscripts
^{pt} superscript: partial attestation
^{vid} superscript: uncertain reading
arab: Arabic versions
arm: Armenian versions
𝔐 or Byz: Byzantine text-type
cop: Coptic versions

sa: Sahidic version
bo: Boharic version

eth: Ethiopic versions
ƒ: Greek manuscripts family
geo: Georgian versions
goth: Gothic versions
it: Italic/Vetus Latina
lat: most Italic and Vulgate
latt: all Italic and Vulgate
𝔓: papyrus
𝑙: individually numbered lectionary
Lect: most or all numbered lectionaries
parenthesized (): approximate reading
rell: all other extant manuscripts
slav: Slavic versions
syr: Syriac versions
vg: Latin Vulgate
ς: Textus Receptus

Uncial sigla
א: Codex Sinaiticus (01)
A: Codex Alexandrinus (02)
B: Codex Vaticanus (03)
C: Codex Ephraemi Rescriptus (04)
D^{ea}: Codex Bezae (05)
D^{p}: Codex Claromontanus (06)
K^{e}: Codex Cyprius (017)
K^{ap}: Codex Mosquensis I (018)
L^{e}: Codex Regius (New Testament) (019)
L^{ap}: Codex Angelicus (020)
P^{apr}: Codex Porphyrianus (025)
S: Codex Vaticanus 354 (028)
V: Codex Mosquensis II (031)
W: Codex Washingtonianus (032)
Z: Codex Dublinensis (035)
Γ: Codex Tischendorfianus IV (036)
Δ: Codex Sangallensis 48 (037)
Θ: Codex Koridethi (038)
Ξ: Codex Zacynthius (040)
Π: Codex Petropolitanus (New Testament) (041)
Φ: Codex Beratinus (043)
Ψ: Codex Athous Lavrensis (044)
Ω: Codex Athous Dionysiou (045)
ff^{1}: Codex Corbeiensis I
ff^{2}: Codex Corbeiensis II
g^{1}: Codex Sangermanensis I
k: Codex Bobiensis

Critical editions
T8th: Tischendorf's 8th Edition of Editio Octava Critica Maior
WH: Westcott and Hort (1881)
NA: Novum Testamentum Graece (Nestle–Aland)
UBS: United Bible Societies
ECM: Editio Critica Maior

== Textual variants ==
Textual variants in the Epistle of Jude

82 Textual variants in Jude

Insciptio

Ιουδα καθολικη επιστολη (Catholic Epistle of Jude) — 18
Ιουδα (Jude) — א^{c} B^{c}
omit — א* B*
Ιουδα επιστολη (Epistle of Jude) — 𝔓^{72} A rell

Jude 1:1

Ιησου Χριστου δουλος — 𝔓^{72} א A B K L P Ψ 056 0142 5 18 3 35 61 81 88 93 254 307 323 326 436 442 453 621 623 630 665 909 915 1241 1243 1409 1505 1611 1678 1739 1837 1845 1852 1875 2200 2298 2344 2805 𝔐 Lect
Χριστου Ιησου — K P 049 6 181 431 468 808 1501 1836 2374
δουλος Ιησου Χριστου — 1881
Χριστου δουλος — 1067

Jude 1:1

τοις — 𝔓^{72} א A B K L P Ψ 049 056 0142 5 18 33 35 61 81 88 93 181 254 307* 326 431 436 442 453 468 621 623 630 665 808 909 915 1067 1175 1409 1501 1678 1735 1836 1837 1844 1845 1846 1875 2200 2298 2344 2374 2805 𝔐 Lect lat cop (eth) geo slav Origen Lucifer Augustine (Cassiodorus)
τοις εθνεσιν — 6 307^{c} 322 323 945 1241 1243 1292 1505 1611 1739 1881 2138 syr arm

Jude 1:1

ηγαπημενοις — 𝔓^{72} א A B Ψ 5 81 88 326^{mg} 330 436 442 451 468 621 623 629 630 915 1067 1241 1243 1292 1409 1505 1611 1739 1845 1846 2138 2200 2298 2344 2492 2495 2805 𝑙^{596} 𝑙^{1141} lat syr cop arm eth geo Origen Lucifer Ephraem Augustine Ps-Athanasius Ps-Oecumenius Cassiodorus Theophylact^{comm}
ηγιασμενοις — K L P 049 056 0142 6 18 35 61 93 104 181 254 307 322 323 326 424 431 453 614 665 808 909 945 1175 1501 1678 1735 1836 1837 1844 1875 1877 1881 2127 2374 2412 𝔐 Lect slav Theophylact
ηγαποιμενοις — 1241
electis — Hilary

Jude 1:1

και Ιησου Χριστω τετηρημενοις — 𝔓^{72} א A B L P 049 056 0142 5 6 18 81 35 1307 322 323 326 436 454 468 623 808 909 945 1067 1241 1243 1409 1501 1678 1739 1837 1845 1846 1852^{vid} 1881 2298 2344 𝔐 Lect^{pt} it^{ar} vg^{mss} cop (eth) slav Origen Lucifer Augustine (Cassiodorus)
και Ιησου Χριστου τετηρημενοις — K 93 181 254 431 665 1175 1735 1836 1844 2374 𝑙^{156} 𝑙^{592}(1/2) 𝑙^{883} 𝑙^{884} 𝑙^{1178}
και Χριστου Ιησου τετηρημενοις — 1852
και Χριστω Ιησου τετηρημενοις — Ψ 442 621 2805 𝑙^{596} vg^{mss} syr^{ph} arm geo
και εν Χριστω Ιησου τετηρημενοις — 61 88 915
omit — 630 1292 1505 1611 1875 2138 2200 syr^{h}

Jude 1:2

και ειρηνη και αγαπη — 𝔓^{72} א A B L P Ψ 049 5 6 18 35 81 93 254 307 323 326 431 436 442 453 468 621 623 665 808 909 1067 1241 1243 1409 1501 1678 1739 1837 1845 1875 1881 2298 2344 2374 𝔐 Lect
ειρηνη και αγαπη — K 056 0142
και ειρηνη εν κυριω και αγαπη — 630 1506 1611 2200
και αγαπη και ειρηνη — 33^{vid} 61
και ειρηνη — 88 181 915 1836 2805

Jude 1:3

ποιουμενος — א Ψ^{c} A B C K L P 049 056 0142 5 6 18 33^{vid} 35 61 81 88 93 181 254 307 323 326 431 436 442 453 468 621 623 630 665 808 909 915 1067 1241 1243 1409 1505 1611 1678 1739 1836 1837 1845 1875 1881 2200 2298 2344^{vid} 2374 2805 𝔐 Lect
ποιουμενοι — Ψ*
ποιησαμενος — 𝔓^{72} 1501

Jude 1:3

γραφειν — A B C K L P 049 056 0142 5 6 18 33^{vid} 35 61 81 88 181 254 307 323 326 431 436 442 453 468 623 630 808 909 915 1067 1243 1409 1501 1505 1611 1678 1739 1836 1837 1845 1875 1881 2200 2298 2344^{vid} 2374 2805 𝔐 Lect
του γραφειν — 𝔓^{72} א Ψ
τουτο γραφειν — 93 665
γραφω — 621 1241

Jude 1:3

ημων — 𝔓^{72} א A B Ψ 5 61 81 88 93 307 322 323 326 431 436 442 453 614 621 623 630 665 915 1067 1243 1292 1409 1611 1678 1735 1739 1837 1845 1846 2138 2200 2344^{vid} 2412 𝑙^{6} 𝑙^{596} vg^{mss} syr cop^{sa} arm eth geo slav Lucifer Cyril Bede Theophylact
ημετερας — 𝑙^{422}
σωτηριας ημων — 𝑙^{884}
υμων — 6 104 254 1505 1844 1881 2298 2495 2805 it vg^{mss} cop^{bo} Hilary Ephraem
omit — K L P 049 056 0142 18 35 181 330 451 468 629 808 909 945 1175 1501 1836 1877 1875 2127 2492 2374 𝔐 Lect^{pt} Ps-Oecumenius Cassiodorus

Jude 1:3

σωτηριας — 𝔓^{72} A B C K L P 049 056 0142 5 6 18 35 61 81 88 93 181 254 307 323 326 431 436 442 453 468 621 623 630 665 808 909 915 1067 1243 1409 1501 1678 1739 1836 1837 1845 1875 1881 2200 2298 2344^{vid} 2374 2805 𝔐 Lect
ζωης — 1505 1611 syr eth
σωτηριας και ζωης — א Ψ

Jude 1:3

γραψαι — 𝔓^{72} A B C K L P 049 056 0142 5 6 18 35 61 81 88 93 181 254 307 323 326 431 436 442 453 468 621 623 630 665 808 909 915 1067 1241 1243 1409 1501 1611 1678 1739 1836 1837 1845 1875 1881 2200 2298 2344 2374 2806 𝔐 Lect
γραφειν — א Ψ 1505

Jude 1:3

επαγωνιζεσθαι — א B C K L P Ψ 049 056 0142 5 6 18 33 35 61 81 88 181 254 307 323 326 431 436 442 453 468 621 623 630 665 808 909 1067 1241 1243 1409 1501 1505 1611 1678 1739 1836 1837 1845 1852^{vid} 1875 1881 2200 2298 2344 2374 2806 𝔐 Lect
επαγωνιζεσθε — 𝔓^{72} A 93 915

Jude 1:3

παραοθειση πιστει — 𝔓^{72}*
παραδοθειση — 𝔓^{72}^{c} א A B C K L P Ψ 049 056 0142 5 6 18 33 35 61 81 88 93 181 254 307 323 326 436 442 453 468 621 623 630 665^{mg} 808 909 915 1067 1243 1409 1501 1505 1611 1678 1739 1836 1837 1845 1875 1881 2200 2298 2344 2374 2806 𝔐 Lect
παραδοθησει — 1241
περιδοθειση — 431
δοθειση — 665

Jude 1:4

παρεισεδυσαν — 𝔓^{72} א A K L P Ψ 049 056 0142 5 6 18 33 35 61 81 88 93 181 254 307 323 326 431 436 442 453 468 621 623 630 665 808 909 915 1241 1243 1409 1501 1505^{vid} 1611 1678 1739 1836 1837 1845 1852^{vid} 1875 1881 2200 2298 2344 2374 2805 𝔐 Lect
παρεισεδυησαν — B C^{vid}
παρεδυσαν — 1067

Jude 1:4

οι και — א
οι — rell

Jude 1:4

προγεγραμενοι — 𝔓^{72}
προγεγραμμενοι — rell

Jude 1:4

κριμα — 𝔓^{72}^{c} א A B C^{vid} K L P 049 056 0142 0251^{vid} 5 6 18 33 35 61 81 88 93 181 254 307 323 326 431 436 442 453 468 621 623 630 665 808 909 915 1067 1241 1243 1409 1501 1505^{vid} 1611 1678 1739 1836 1837 1845 1875 1881 2200 2298 2344 2374 2805 𝔐 𝑙^{596}
κρισμα — 𝔓^{72}*
κηρυγμα — Ψ

Jude 1:4

τη — 𝔓^{72}*
την — rell

Jude 1:4

χαριτα — 𝔓^{72} A B
χαριν — א C K L P Ψ 049 056 0142 0251^{vid} 5 6 18 33 35 61 81 88 93 181 254 307 323 326 431 436 442 453 468 621 623 630 665 808 909 915 1067 1241 1243 1409 1501 1505 1611 1678 1739 1836 1837 1845 1852 1875 1881 2200 2298 2344 2374 2805 𝔐 Lect

Jude 1:4

νομον — 𝔓^{72}*
omit — 𝔓^{72}^{c}
μονον — rell

Jude 1:4

δεσποτην — 𝔓^{78} א A B C 0251 6 33 61 81 93 307 322 323 326* 326^{c} 431 436 442 453* 621 808 1067 1241 1243 1409 1678 1739 1837 1845 1846 1881 2344 2805 Lect^{pt} lat cop arm eth geo Lucifer Didymus Cyril
ημων δεσποτην — 𝔓^{72}
δεσποτην θεον — K L P Ψ 049 056 0142 5 18 35 88 181 254 326^{c} 453^{c} 468 623 630 665 909 915 945 1175 1292 1501 1505 1611 1735 1836 1844 1875 2138 2200 2298 2374 𝔐 Lect^{pt} syr slav
δεσποτην και θεον — 𝑙^{596}^{pt}
θεον — 𝑙^{593}

Jude 1:4

κυριον — 𝔓^{78}
και κυριον — rell

Jude 1:4

Ιησουν Χριστον ημων — 𝔓^{72}
υμων Ιησουν Χριστον — 1241
ημων Ιησουν Χριστον — 𝔓^{78} א A B C K L Ψ 049 0142 0251^{vid} 5 6 18 33 35 61 81 93 254 307 322 323 326 431 436 442 453 468 621 623 630 665 808 909 945 1067 1175 1243 1292 1409 1501 1505 1611 1678 1735 1739 1844 1845 1846 2138 2200 2298 2344 2374 2805 𝔐 Lect it^{ar} vg^{mss} syr cop arm eth geo slav (Lucifer) Didymus Cyril
ημων Ιησουν — 1837
Ιησουν Χριστον — 88 181 915 1836 1875 1881 𝑙^{422} 𝑙^{593} vg^{mss}

Jude 1:5

δε — 𝔓^{72} 𝔓^{78} א A B K L 049 056 0142 0251 5 18 33 35 61 81 88 181 254 307 326 431 436 442 468 621 623 630 808 909 915 1067 1409 1505 1611 1678 1836 1837 1845 1875 2200 2344 2374 2805 𝔐 Lect
ουν — C Ψ 6 93 323 665 1241 1243 1501 1739 2298 Lucifer
omit — 1881 cop^{bo^{mss}}

Jude 1:5

ειδοτας τουτο υμας — 0142
ειδοτας υμας — א B K L 049 056 18 35 181 254 326 431 468 909 1836 1837 1875 2374 𝔐 Lect
ιδοντας — 33*
ειδωτας — 1241
ειδοτας — 𝔓^{72} A C Ψ 0251 5 6 33^{c} 61 81 88 93 307 323 436 442 453 621 623 630 665 808 915 1067 1243 1409 1501 1505 1611 1678 1739 1845 1881 2200 2344 2805 𝑙^{596} lat
ειδοτας ημας — 2298

Jude 1:5

παντα απαξ γαρ Ιησους — 1739^{mg}
απαξ παντα οτι Ιησους — A B 33 81 2344 it^{dem,div} vg^{mss} (eth) Jerome
απαξ παντα οτι κυριος — Ephraem
απαξ τουτο οτι ο θεος — 5 623^{mg}
απαξ παντα οτι ο θεος — C^{c} 623 2805 vg^{ms} (slav)
απαξ παντας οτι θεος Χριστος — 𝔓^{72}*
απαξ παντα οτι θεος Χριστος — 𝔓^{72}^{c}
παντα οτι κυριος απαξ — א Ψ
παντα οτι ο κυριος απαξ — C* 307 326 431 436 453 630 808 1505 1611 2138 2200 2412 2495 syr^{h}
παντα οτι ο θεος — Lucifer
παντα οτι ο θεος απαξ — 442 621 1243 1845 1846 2492 𝑙^{596} it^{p} vg^{mss} syr^{ph} arm geo Clement^{vid}
παντα οτι Ιησους — Cyril
παντα οτι Ιησους απαξ — 6 93 322 323 665 1241 1501 1739 1881 2298 it^{ar,c} cop Origen^{per 1739}
παντα οτι ο Ιησους απαξ — 88 915
απαξ οτι ο κυριος — 1409
απαξ τουτο οτι ο κυριος — L 049 18 35 61 104 181 254 307 326 330 431 436 451 453 629 808 (909) 945 1067 1175 1292 1678 1836 1837 1844 (1875) 1877 2127 2374 𝔐 Lect^{pt} Ps-Oecumenius Theophylact
απαξ τουτο οτι Χριστος Ιησους — 1735 𝑙^{591}
τουτο απαξ οτι ο κυριος — K 056 𝑙^{593}
απαξ τουτο υμας οτι ο κυριος — 0142

Jude 1:6

τε — 𝔓^{72} א B C K L Ψ 049 056 0142 5 6 18 33 35 61 81 88 93 254 307 323 326 436 442 453 468 623 630 665 808 909 915 1241 1243 1409 1678 1739 1837 1845 1881 2200 2298 2344 2374 2805 𝔐 Lect
δε — A 18 431 621 1067 1501 1505 1611 1836 1875

Jude 1:7

Γομορρα — א A B C K L Ψ 049 056 0142 5 6 18 33 35 61 81 88 93 181 254 307 323 326 431 436 442 453 468 621 623 630 665 808 909 915 1067 1409 1501 1505 1611 1678 1739 1836 1837 1845 1875 1881 2200 2298 2374 2805 𝔐 Lect
Γομορα — 𝔓^{72} 1241 1243 1852 2344

Jude 1:7

τροπον τουτοις — 𝔓^{72} א A B C 5 33 35* 61 81 93 323 326 431 442 621 623 630 665 1241 1243 1505 1611 1739 1837 1881 2200 2298 2344 2374 2805 𝑙^{596}
τουτοις τροπον — K L 049 056 6 18 35^{c} 254 307 436 453 468 808 909 1067 1501 1678^{vid} 𝔐 Lect
τροπον αυτοις — Ψ
αυτοις τροπον — 0142 1409
τροπον — 88 181 915 1836 1845 1875

Jude 1:7

εκπορνευσασαι — 𝔓^{72}^{c} א A B C K L Ψ 049 056 0142^{mg} 5 6 18 33^{c} 35 61 81 88 93 181 254 307 323 326 431 436 442 453 468 621 623 630 665 808 909 915 1067 1241 1501 1505 1611 1678 1739 1836 1837 1845 1875 1881 2200 2298 2344 2374 2805 𝔐 Lect
εκπορνευσασθαι — 𝔓^{72}* 1243
εκπορρνευσασαι — 33*
εκπορευσασαι — 0142
ακολουθησασαι — 1409

Jude 1:7

υπεχουσαι — 𝔓^{72} B C K L Ψ 049 056 0142 5 6 18 33 35 61 81 88 93 254 307 323 326 431 436 442 453 468 621 623 665 808 909 915 1067 1241 1243 1409 1501 1505 1678 1739 1836 1837 1875 1881 2298 2344 2374 2805 𝔐 Lect
υπερεχουσαι — A
επεχουσαι — 𝔓^{78} 630 1611 2200
ουκ εχουσιν — א*
υπεχουσιν — א^{c}
απεχουσαι — 181
υπαρχουσαι — 1845

Jude 1:8

αυτοι — 𝔓^{78}
ουτοι — rell

Jude 1:8

κυριοτητα — 𝔓^{72} 𝔓^{78} A B C K L 049 056 0142 5 6 18 33 35 61 81 88 93 181 254 307 322 323 326 431 436 442 453 468 621 623 630 665 808 909 915 945 1067 1175 1243 1292 1409 1501 1505 1611 1678 1735 1739 1836 1837 1844 1875 1881 2138 2200 2298 2344 2374 𝔐 Lect lat syr cop^{bo} eth geo Clement Origen^{gr} Lucifer Epiphanius Jerome
κυριωτητα — 1241
κυριοτητας — א Ψ 1845 1846 2805 vg^{ms} cop^{sa} arm slav Origen^{lat} Priscillian

Jude 1:8

δοξας — 𝔓^{72} א A B C K L Ψ 049 056 0142 6 18 33 35 61 81 88 93 181 254 307 322 323 326 431 436 442 453 468 621 623 630 665 808 909 915 945 1067 1175 1241 1243 1292 1409 1501 1505 1611 1735 1739 1836 1837 1844 1845 1846 1852 1875 1881 2138 2200 2298 2344 2374 2805 𝔐 Lect
δοξαν — 𝔓^{78} 5

Jude 1:9

οτε — B
ο δε — rell

Jude 1:9

Μιχαης — 𝔓^{72}
Μιχαηλ — rell

Jude 1:9

τοτε — B
οτε — rell

Jude 1:9

Μωυσεως — 𝔓^{72} א B C L 0142* 5 33 61 81 93 181 254 307 326 431 436 442 453 468 621 623 665 808 909 1067 1243 1409 1501 1836 1837 1845 1875 1881 2200* 2344 2374 2805 𝑙^{596}
Μωσεως — A K Ψ 049 056 0142^{c} 6 18 35 88 323 630 915 1241 1505 1611 1739 2200 2298 𝔐 Lect

Jude 1:9

αλλα — 𝔓^{72} A B Ψ 93
αλλ’ — א C K L 049 056 0142 5 6 18 33 35 61 81 88 181 254 307 323 326 431 436 442 453 468 621 623 630 665 808 909 915 1067 1241 1243 1409 1501 1505 1611 1678 1739 1836 1837 1845 1875 1881 2200 2298 2344 2374 2805 𝔐 Lect

Jude 1:9

σοι — 𝔓^{72} א A B^{c} C K L 049 056 0142 5 6 18 33 35 61 81 88 93 181 254 307 326 431 436 442 453 468 621 623 630 665 808 909 915 1067 1243 1409 1501 1505 1611 1678 1836 1837 1845 1875 2200 2298 2344 2374 2805 𝔐 Lect
εν σοι — B*^{vid} Ψ 323 1241 1739 1881

Jude 1:9

κυριος — 𝔓^{72} A B C K L Ψ 049 056 0142 5 6 18 33 35 61 81 88 93 181 254 307 326 431 436 453 468 623 665 808 909 915 1067 1243 1409 1678 1836 1837 1845 1875 2298 2344 2374 𝔐 Lect
ο κυριος — א^{c} 442 621 630 1505 1611 2200 2805 𝑙^{596}
ο θεος — א* 323 1241 1739 1881
κυριος ο θεος — 1501

Jude 1:11

Βαλααμ — א A B C K L Ψ 049 056 0142 5 6 18 33 35 61 81 93 181 254 307 323 326 431 436 442 453 468 621 623 630 665 808 909 1067 1241 1243 1409 1501 1505 1611 1678 1739 1836 1837 1845 1875^{c} 1881 2200 2298 2344 2374 2805 𝔐 Lect
Βαλαμ — 1875*
Βαλλαμ — 𝔓^{72}*
Βαλαακ — 𝔓^{72}^{c}

Jude 1:12

εισιν — 𝔓^{72} א^{c} A B K L Ψ 049 056 0142 5 6 18 33 35 61 81 88 93 181 254 307 323 326 431 436 442 453 468 621 623 630 665 808 909 915 1067 1241 1243 1409 1501 1505 1611 1678 1739 1836 1837 1845 1852 1875 1881 2200 2298 2344 2374 2805 𝔐 𝑙^{596}
εισιν γογγυσται μεμψιμοιροι κατα τας επιθυμιας αυτων πορευομενοι — א* cop^{sa,bo^{mss}}
εισιν γογγυσται μεμψιμοιροι κατα τας ιδιας επιθυμιας αυτων πορευομενοι — C^{c}

Jude 1:12

οι — 𝔓^{72} א^{c} B L Ψ 5 6 33 35* 61 81 88 93 307 323 326 431 442 453 621 623 630 665 915 1241 1243 1505 1611 1678 1739 1837 1845 1852 1881 2200 2298 2344 2374 2805 𝑙^{596}
omit — 𝔓^{74}^{vid} א* A K 049 056 0142 18 35^{c} 181 254 436 468 642 808 909 1067 1175 1409 1501 1836 1875 𝔐 Lect

Jude 1:12

αγαπαις αυτων — lat syr^{ph} cop^{sa^{ms}}
αγαπαις υμων — 𝔓^{72} א B K L Ψ 049 056 0142 5 18 33 35 61 81 93 181 254 307 322 323 326 431 436 442 453 468 621 623 630 665 808 909 945 1067 1175 1241 1292 1409 1501 1505 1611 1678 1735 1739 1836 1837 1844 1875 1881 2138 2200 2298 2344 2374 2805 𝔐 Lect syr^{h} cop eth geo slav Lucifer Ephraem Augustine Palladius
απαταις υμων — A* C^{vid} (1243 ημων) 82 88 378 460 915 1845 1846
απαταις αυτων — A^{c}
ευωχιαις υμων — 6 224^{c}

Jude 1:12

συνευχομενοι — 𝔓^{72}
συνερχομενοι — 1875^{c}
συνευωχουμενοι — א A B K L Ψ 049 056 0142 5 18 33 61 81 181 254 307 326 431 436 442 453 468 621 623 630 808 909 1067 1409 1505 1611 1678 1836 1837 1875* 2200 2344 2374 2805 𝔐 Lect
συνευωχουμενοι υμιν — C 6 88 93 323 665 915 1241 1243 1501 1739 1845 1881 2298

Jude 1:12

εαυτους πεμενοντες νεφελε — 𝔓^{72}^{c}
αυτους πεμενοντες νεφελε — 𝔓^{72}*
εαυτους ποιμαινοντες νεφελαι — rell

Jude 1:12

παντι ανεμω — א
υπο ανεμων — rell

Jude 1:12

παραφερομεναι — 𝔓^{72}^{c} א A C K L 049 5 18 33 61 81 88 93 181 254 307 323 326 431 436 453 468 623 630 665 808 909 915 1067 1409 1241 1243 1505 1611 1678 1739 1836 1837 1881 2200 2298 2344 2374 2805 𝔐 Lect
παραφερομενοι — 𝔓^{72}* B Ψ 442 621 1845 1852 𝑙^{596}
περιφερομεναι — 6 1501
διαφερομεναι — 1875
φερομεναι — 056 0142

Jude 1:13

επαφριζοντα — א A B K L Ψ 049 056 0142 6 18 35 88 181 307 436 453 468 808 909 915 1067 1409 1501 1678 1836 1845 1875 2374 𝔐 Lect
απαφριζοντα — 𝔓^{72} C 5 33 61 81 93 254 323 326 431 442 621 623 630 665 1241 1243 1505 1611 1739 1837 1852 1881 2200 2298 2344 2805 𝑙^{596}

Jude 1:13

πλανηται οις ο ζοφος του — 𝔓^{72} א A C K L Ψ 049 056 0142 5 6 18 33 35 61 81 88 93 181 254 307 323 326 431 436 442 453 468 621 623 630 665 808 909^{c} 915 1067 1243 1409 1501 1505 1611 1678 1739 1836 1837 1845 1852 1875 1881 2200 2298 2374 2805 2344 𝔐 Lect
πλανηται οις οι ο ζοφος του — 909*
πλανητες οις ζοφος — B
πλανηται εις ο ζοφος τους — 1241

Jude 1:13

αιωνα — 𝔓^{72} א A B C L 5 18 33 35 61 81 88 93 181 254 307 323 326 431 436 453 468 621 623 630 665 808 909 915 1067 1243 1409 1505 1611 1678 1739 1836 1845 1852 1875 2200 2298 2374 2805 2344 𝔐 Lect
τον αιωνα — K 049 056 0142 6 1501
αιωνας — Ψ 442 1241 1837 1881

Jude 1:14

προεφυτευσεν — 181
προεφητευσεν — A C K L Ψ 049 056 0142 5 6 18 33 35 61 81 88 93 254 307 323 326 431 436 442 453 468 621 623 630 665 808 909 915 1067 1241 1243 1409 1501 1505 1611 1678 1739 1836 1837 1845 1852 1875 1881 2200 2298 2344 2374 2805 𝔐 Lect
προπροφητευσεν — א
επροφητευσεν — 𝔓^{72} B*
επροεφητευσεν — B^{c}

Jude 1:14

κυριος — 𝔓^{72} A B C K L Ψ 049 056 0142 5 6 18 33 35 81 88 93 254 307 323 431 436 442 453 468 621 623 630 665 808 909 915 1241 1243 1501 1505 1611 1678 1739 1836 1837* 1845 1852 1875 1881 2200 2298 2344 2374 2805 𝔐 Lect
ο κυριος — א 61 181 326 1067 1409 1837^{c}

Jude 1:14

αγιαις μυριασιν αυτου — A B K L 049 056 0142 5 6 18 33 35 81 254 307 431 436 453 468 623 808 909 1067 1409 1501 1678 2344 2374 2805 𝔐 Lect
μυριασιν αγιαις αυτου — C 323 630 1241 1243 1505 1611 1739 1881 2200 2298
αγιαις μυριασιν — 1852
αγιαις μυριασιν αγγελων — Ψ
αγιαις μυριασιν αγγελων αυτου — 61 93 181 326 665 1836 1837
αγιων αγγελων μυριασιν — 𝔓^{72}
μυριασιν αγιων αγγελων — א
μυριασιν αγιων αγγελων αυτου — 88 442 915 1845 𝑙^{596}
μυριασιν αγιων αγγελων αυτου αγιων — 621

Jude 1:15

ελεγξαι — 𝔓^{72} א A B C K L Ψ 049 5 6 18 33 35 61 81 88 93 181 254 307 323 326 431 442 453 468 621 623 630 665 808 909 915 1241 1243 1501 1505 1611 1678 1739 1836 1837 1845 1852 1875 1881 2200 2298 2344 2374 2805 𝔐 Lect
εξελεγξαι — 436 1067 1409

Jude 1:15

παντας ασεβεις — 6 323 1241 1739 1881 2298
παντας τους ασεβεις — A B C Ψ 5 33 61 81 93 307 323 326 431 436 453 468 623 630 642 665 808 1067 1243 1409 1448 1501 1505 1611 1678 1735 1739 1837 1845 2200 2344 2374 2495 2805 vg syr^{h} cop^{bo^{mss}}
τους ασεβεις — 442 621 𝑙^{596}
πασαν ψυχην — 𝔓^{72} א 1852 syr^{ph} cop^{sa,bo^{mss}}
παντας τους ασεβεις αυτων — K L 049 18 35 88 181 254 909 915 1175 1836 1875 2492 𝔐 Lect

Jude 1:15

των εργων ασεβειας αυτων — A B K L 049 056 0142 5 18 33 35 81 88 93 181 254 431 436 468 623 665 808 909 915 1067 1409 1501 1836 1875 2344 𝔐 Lect
εργων ασεβειας αυτων — 61 326 1837
των εργων — א 6 323 1241 1739 1881 2298 2374 2805
των εργων αυτων — C 307 442 453 621 1243 1678 1845 𝑙^{596}
εργων ασεβειων αυτων — 1852
των ασεβειων αυτων — Ψ
των εργων των ασεβειων αυτων — Ψ^{mg} 630 1505 1611 2200

Jude 1:15

περι παντων των — 𝔓^{72}^{mg}
περι παντων — 𝔓^{72}
και περι παντων των — rell

Jude 1:15

σκληρων — 𝔓^{72} A B K L P Ψ 049 056 0142 5 18 35 61 181 254 326 431 436 468 623 642 808 909 1067 1175 1409 1678 1735 1836 1837 1875 2492 𝔐 Lect cop^{bo}
σκληρων λογων — א C 6 33 81 88 93 307 323 442 453 621 630 665 915 1241 1243 1448 1501 1505 1611 1739 1845 1852 1881 2200 2298 2344 2374 2805 𝑙^{596} vg^{mss} syr cop^{sa}

Jude 1:16

αυτων — א A B K Ψ 056 0142 5 33 61 81 88 93 181 254 307 326 431 453 468 623 630 665 909 915 945 1409* 1501 1505 1611 1678 1739 1836 1837 1875 2200 2344 2374 2805 𝔐 Lect
εαυτων — 𝔓^{72}^{c} C L P 049 1 6 18 35 254^{mg} 323 436 442 621 808 1067 1241 1243 1409^{c} 1739 1845 1852 2298 2495 𝑙^{596}^{c}
omit — (𝔓^{72}*

Jude 1:16

και το — א A B C K L P Ψ 049 5 6 18 33 35 61 81 88 93 181 254 307 323 326 431 436 442 453 468 621 623 630 665 808 909 915 1067 1243 1501 1505 1611 1678 1739 1836 1837 1845 1852 1875 1881 2200 2298 2344 2374 2805 𝔐 Lect
και — 𝔓^{72} 056 0142 1490
το — 1241

Jude 1:17

ρηματων των προειρημενων — 𝔓^{72} א B C L P Ψ 049 056 0142 5 18 33 35 61 81 88 93 181 254 307 326 431 436 442 453 468 621 623 665 808 909 915 1067 1243 1409 1678 1836 1837 1845 1852 1875 2344 2805 𝔐 Lect
προειρημενων ρηματων — A 6 323 630 1241 1501 1505 1611 1739 1881 2200 2298 2374 Lucifer

Jude 1:18

ελεγον υμιν — א B L Ψ 61 2344 Lucifer
ελεγον υμιν οτι — 𝔓^{72} A C L^{mg} P 049 056 0142 5 6 18 33 35 81 88 93 181 254 307 323 326 431 436 442 453 468 621 623 630 642 665 808 909 915 1067 1175 1241 1243 1409 1448 1501 1505 1611 1678 1735 1739 1836 1837 1845 1852 1875 1881 2200 2298 2374 2492 2805 𝔐 Lect vg syr
ελεγεν ημιν οτι — K

Jude 1:18

επ’ εσχατου χρονου — 𝔓^{72} B C Ψ 5 623 1243
επ’ εσχατου του χρονου — א A 33 61 254 431 436 630 1067 1409 1505 1611 1837 1845 1852 2200 2495
επ’ εσχατου των χρονων — 6 81 307 323 453 1241 1678 1739 2298 2805 vg^{mss} cop
επ’ εσχατου των ημερων — 1881 (Lucifer)
επ’ εσχατω του χρονου — 326
επ’ εσχατω των χρονων — 326^{mg}
επ’ εσχατων του χρονου — 621 𝑙^{596}
επ’ εσχατων των χρονων — 93 442 665 2344
εν εσχατω τω χρονω — P
εν εσχατω χρονων — 056 0142
εν εσχατω χρονω — 𝔓^{72}^{vid} K L 049 18 35 88 181 468 808 909 915 1836 1875 2374 𝔐 Lect vg^{mss}

Jude 1:18

εσονται εμπαικται — 𝔓^{72} א* C* K (L εμπαιγκται) P 049 056 0142 18 35 88 181 254 442 468 621 630 808 909 915 1243 1505 1611 1678 1836 1845 1852 1875 2200 2374 𝔐 𝑙^{596}
ελευσονται εμπαικται — אc A C 5 6 33 61 81 93 307 323 326 431 436 453 623 665 1067 1241 1409 1501 1739 1837 1881 2298 2344 2805
αναστησονται εμπαικται — Ψ

Jude 1:18

εαυτων εμπιθυμιας — 307
εαυτων επιθυμιας — 𝔓^{72} A B C K L P 049 056 0142 0316 5 6 18 33 35 61 81 88 93 181 254 323 326 431 436 442 453 468 621 623 665 808 909 915 1067 1241 1243 1409 1678 1739 1836 1837 1845 1852 1881 2298 2344 2374 2805 𝔐 Lect
αυτων επιθυμιας — Ψ (1501)
επιθυμιας εαυτων — א^{c} (1875)
επιθυμιας αυτων — א* 630 1505 1611 2200

Jude 1:19

αποδιωριζοντες — 𝔓^{72} K
αποδιοριζοντες — 0316
οι διοριζοντες — א^{c}
οι αποδιοριζοντες — א* A B L P Ψ 049 056 0142 18 33 35^{c} 61 81 93 181 254 307 326 431 436 442 453 468 665 909 945 1067 1175 1241 1409 1501 1678 1735 1739* 1836 1837 1844 1845 1852 1875 2344 𝔐 Lect vg^{mss} arm Clement Lucifer Didymus Cyril
οι αποδιοριζοντες εαυτους — C 5 6 35* 88 322 323 621 623 630 808 915 1243 1292 1505 1506 1611 1739^{c} 1846 1881 2138 2200 2298 2374 2805 Lect it^{ar} vg^{mss} geo slav Augustine Fulgentius
omit — 𝑙^{422}

Jude 1:20

εποικοδομουντες αυτους τη αγιωτατη υμων πιστει — 88*
επωκοδομουντες εαυτους τη αγιωτατη υμων πιστει — 621
εποικοδομουντες εαυτους τη αγιωτατη υμων πιστει — א A B Ψ 0316 5 33 61 81 88^{c} 93 326 436 442 623 630 665 808 915 1067 1243 1505 1611 1837 1845 1881 2200 2374 2805 𝑙^{596}
εποικοδομουντες εαυτους τη αγιωτατη ημων πιστει — C 323 431 1409 1739 1852 2298
εποικοδομουντες εαυτους τη αγιοτητι ημων εν πιστει — 1241
τη αγιωτατη υμων πιστει εποικοδομουντες εαυτους — K L P 049 056 0142 18 35 181 254 468 909 1501 1678 1836 1875 𝔐 Lect
τη αγιωτατη ημων πιστει εποικοδομουντες εαυτους — 6 307 453
τη εαυτων αγιοτητι πιστει ανοικοδομεισθη εαυτους — 𝔓^{72}

Jude 1:20

προσευχομενοι — א A B C L P Ψ 056 0142 0316 5 6 18 33 35 61 81 88 93 181 254 307 323 326 431 436 442 453 468 621 623 630 665 808 909 915 1067 1241 1243 1409 1501 1505 1611 1678 1739 1836 1837 1845 1852 1875 1881 2200 2298 2344 2374 2805 𝔐 Lect
προσευχομενοι εαυτοις — 𝔓^{72}^{c} K 049
προσεχομενοι εαυτοις — 𝔓^{72}*

Jude 1:21

τηρησατε — א A L K P 049 056 0142 0316 5 6 18 33 35 61 81 88 93 254 307 323 326 436 442 453 468 623 630 665 808 909 915 1067 1241 1409 1501 1678 1739 1836 1837 1875 1881 2200 2298 2344 2374 2805 𝔐 Lect vg
τηρησομεν — 1243
τηρησωμεν — 𝔓^{72} B C*^{vid} Ψ 1505 1611 1845 1852 syr cop
τηρησητε — C^{c}
τηρησαντες — 431 621

Jude 1:21

κυριου ημων Ιησου Χριστου εις ζωην — א A B C L K P Ψ 049 056 0142 0316 5 6 18 33 35 61 81 88 93 181 254 307 323 326 431 436 442 453 468 621 623 630 665 808 909 915 1067 1243 1501 1505 1611 1678 1739 1836 1837 1852 1845 1875 1881 2200 2298 2344 2374 2805 𝔐 Lect
ημων Ιησου Χριστου εις ζωην — 1409
κυριου Ιησου Χριστου εις ζωην — 1241
εις ζοην ημων Ιησου Χριστου — 𝔓^{72}

Jude 1:22

ελεειτε διακρινομενους — K^{comm} 1852 𝑙^{1439}
ελεατε διακρινομενους — א B C^{c} Ψ 88 442 621 915 1243 1845 1846 𝑙^{596} 𝑙^{680} syr^{h} geo
ελεγχετε διακρινομενους — A C* 0316 5 6 33 61 81 93 (181 ἐλέγετε) 322 323 326 436 623 665 1067 1241 1409 1611 1735 1739 1836 1837 1875 1881 2298 2344 2374 2805 𝑙^{422} lat cop^{bo} Ephraem Ps-Oecumenius^{comm} Cassiodorus Theophylact^{comm}
ελεγχετε διακρινομενοι — 629
ελεγετε διακρινομενοι — 181 2492
ελεγχεται διακρινομενοι — 1241
ελεειτε διακρινομενω — 1505
ελεειτε διακρινομενοι — K L P 049 056 0142 18 35 104 254 307 330 431 451 454 468 630 808 909 945 1175 1292 1501 1678 1844 1877 2127 2200 2412 2495 𝔐 Lect^{pt} vg^{ms} slav Ps-Oecumenius Theophylact
omit — 𝔓^{72} it^{t} syr^{ph} cop^{sa} Clement Orsiesius Jerome

Jude 1:23

ους δε σωζετε εκ πυρος αρπαζετε — א*
ους δε σωζετε εκ πυρος αρπαζοντες — א^{c} A C Ψ 0316 5 6 33 61 81 93 104 181 307 322 323 326 436 442 453 621 623 630 665 808 1067 1241 1243 (1292) 1409 1505 1678 1735 1739 1836 1837 1845* 1846 1875 1881 2200 2298 2344 2374 2412 2495 2805 𝑙^{156} 𝑙^{422} 𝑙^{596} 𝑙^{617} lat cop^{bo} syr^{h} (arm) (geo) Clement^{lat} Ephraem
ους δε εν φοβω σωζεται εκ πυρος αρπαζοντες — 049 0142
ους δε εν φοβω σωζετε εκ πυρος αρπαζοντες — K L P 056 18 88 35 254 330 431 451 468 629 909 915 945 1175 1611 1844 1845^{c} 1877 2127 2492 𝔐 Lect^{pt} slav Ps-Oecumenius Theophylact
ους δε εν φοβω σωζετε εκ του πυρος αρπαζοντες — 1501
σωζετε εκ πυρος αρπαζοντες — B
εκ πυρος αρπασατε — 𝔓^{72}
εκ πυρος αρπαζετε — it^{t} syr^{ph} cop^{sa} Clement^{gr} Orsiesius Jerome

Jude 1:23

ους δε ελεατε εν φοβω — א A B Ψ 6 33 81 93 181 322 323 326 623 665 1611 1735 1739 1836 1837 1875 1881 2298 2374 lat cop^{bo} arm geo Clement^{lat} Ephraem
τους δε ελεειτε εν φοβω — 0316
ους δε ελεειτε εν φοβω — 5 436 1067 1241 1409 2344
ους δε ελεειτε εν φοβω θεου — 629 it^{p^{(c)}}
ους δε ελεγετε εν φοβω — 2412
ους δε ελεγχετε εν φοβω — 88 104 307 442 453 621 915 945 1678 1845^{c} 1846 𝑙^{596} Ps-Oecumenius^{comm} Theophylact^{comm}
εν φοβω — C 630 1243 1505 1845* 1852 2200
διακρινομενους δε ελεειτε — Clement^{gr} Orsiesius Jerome
διακρινομενους δε ελεειτε εν φοβω — 𝔓^{72} it^{t} syr^{ph} cop^{sa}
omit — K L P 049 056 0142 18 35 254 330 431 451 468 808 909 1175 1292 1844 1877 2127 2492 2495 𝔐 Lect syr^{h} slav Ps-Oecumenius Theophylact

Jude 1:24

φυλαξαι υμας απταιστους και — א B C L Ψ 056 0142 0316 5 6 33 61 81 88 93 181 254 307 326 436 442 453 468 621 623 630 665 808 909 915 1067 1243 1409 1505 1611 1678 1836 1837 1845 1852 1875 2200 2374 2805 𝑙^{596}
υμας φυλαξαι απταιστους και — 323 1241 1501 1739 1881 2298
φυλαξαι υμας απταιστως και — 2344
φυλαξαι ημας απταιστους και — A
φυλαξαι ημας αμεμπτους και — 431
φυλαξαι αυτους απταιστους και — K P 049 18 35 𝔐 Lect
omit — 𝔓^{72}

Jude 1:24

στησαι κατενωπιον — א A B K L P Ψ 049 056 0142 18 33 35 61 81 181 326 431 436 808 909 1067 1409 1836 1837 1875 2344 2374 𝔐 Lect
στηριξαι κατενωπιον — 0316 5 623 2805
στησαι κατεναντι — 88 915
ασπιλους στησαι κατενωπιον — 442 621 𝑙^{596}
ασπιλους και στησαι κατενωπιον — 6 93 307 323 453 468 665 1241 1501 1678 1739 1881 2298
ασπιλους στησαι ενωπιον — C 254 1243 1505 1611 1845 1852
ασπιλους και στησαι ενωπιον — 630 2200
στηριξαι ασπειλους — 𝔓^{72}

Jude 1:25

μονω — 𝔓^{72} א A B C Ψ 0316 6 33 81 88 93 181 322 323 436 442 621 623* 630 665 915 1067 1241 1243 1292 1409 1505 1611 1739 1836 1845 1852 1875 1881 2200 2298 2344 2805 𝑙^{596} lat syr cop arm geo Fulgentius
μονω σοφω — K L P 049 056 0142 5 18 35 61 254 307 326 431 453 468 623^{c} 808 909 945 1175 1501 1678 1735 1837 1844 1846 2374 𝔐 Lect slav

Jude 1:25

δια Ιησου Χριστου του κυριου ω ημων — 𝔓^{72}*
δια Ιησου Χριστου του κυριου ημων — 𝔓^{72}^{c} א A B C L Ψ 0316 5 6 33 61 81 88 93 181 254 307 323 326 436 442 453 621 623 630 665 915 1067 1409 1501 1505 1611 1678 1739 1836 1837 1845 1852 1875 1881 2200 2298 2344 2374 2805 𝑙^{596}
δια Ιησου Χριστου του κυριου υμων — 1241
omit — K P 049 056 0142 18 35 431 468 808 909 1243 𝔐 Lect

Jude 1:25

δοξα — א^{c} A B C 0316 5 33 81 93 254 323 326 431 436 442 623^{c} 630 665 1067 1241 1243 1409 1505 1611 1739 1836 1837 1845 1852 1875 2200 2298 2344 2805 𝑙^{596}
δοξα και — 𝔓^{72} K L P 049 056 0142 6 18 35 61 88 181 307 453 468 621 623* 808 909 915 1501 1678 1881 2374 𝔐 Lect
ω δοξα — א*
omit — Ψ

Jude 1:25

προ παντος του αιωνος — א A B C L Ψ 0316 5 33 61 81 93 181 254 326 378 431 442 467 506 621 623 665 808 1243 1505 1611 1827 1836 1837 1845 1852 1875 2401^{c} 2805 𝑙^{596} vg syr^{h} cop arm (eth) Ephraem
προ παντος αιωνος — 6 88 307 323 436 453 630 915 1067 1241 1409 1501 1678 1739 1881 2200 2298 2344 2374
omit — 𝔓^{72} K P 049 056 0142 18 35 468 909 2401* 𝔐 Lect

Jude 1:25

παντας τους αιωνας — A B C K P Ψ 049 056 0142 5 6 18 35 81 93 181 254 307 323 431 436 453 468 506 623 630 665 808 1067 1243 1409 1501 1505 1611 1678 1739 1845 1852 1875 1881 2200 2298 2374 2401 2805 𝔐 Lect
τους παντας αιωνας — 326^{c}
τους αιωνας παντας — 1837
τους απαντας αιωνας — 326*
τους παντας εωνας — 𝔓^{72}
τους αιωνας — א^{.} 0316 1836
αιωνας παντας — 61
παντας τους αιωνας των αιωνων — L 33 88 442 621 909 915 2344 𝑙^{596}
τους αιωνας των αιωνων — 1241

== See also ==
- Alexandrian text-type
- Biblical inerrancy
- Byzantine text-type
- Caesarean text-type
- Categories of New Testament manuscripts
- Comparison of codices Sinaiticus and Vaticanus
- List of New Testament verses not included in modern English translations
- Textual variants in the New Testament
- Western text-type
