= 2 Peter 1 =

- ← 1 Peter 5 chapter 2 →
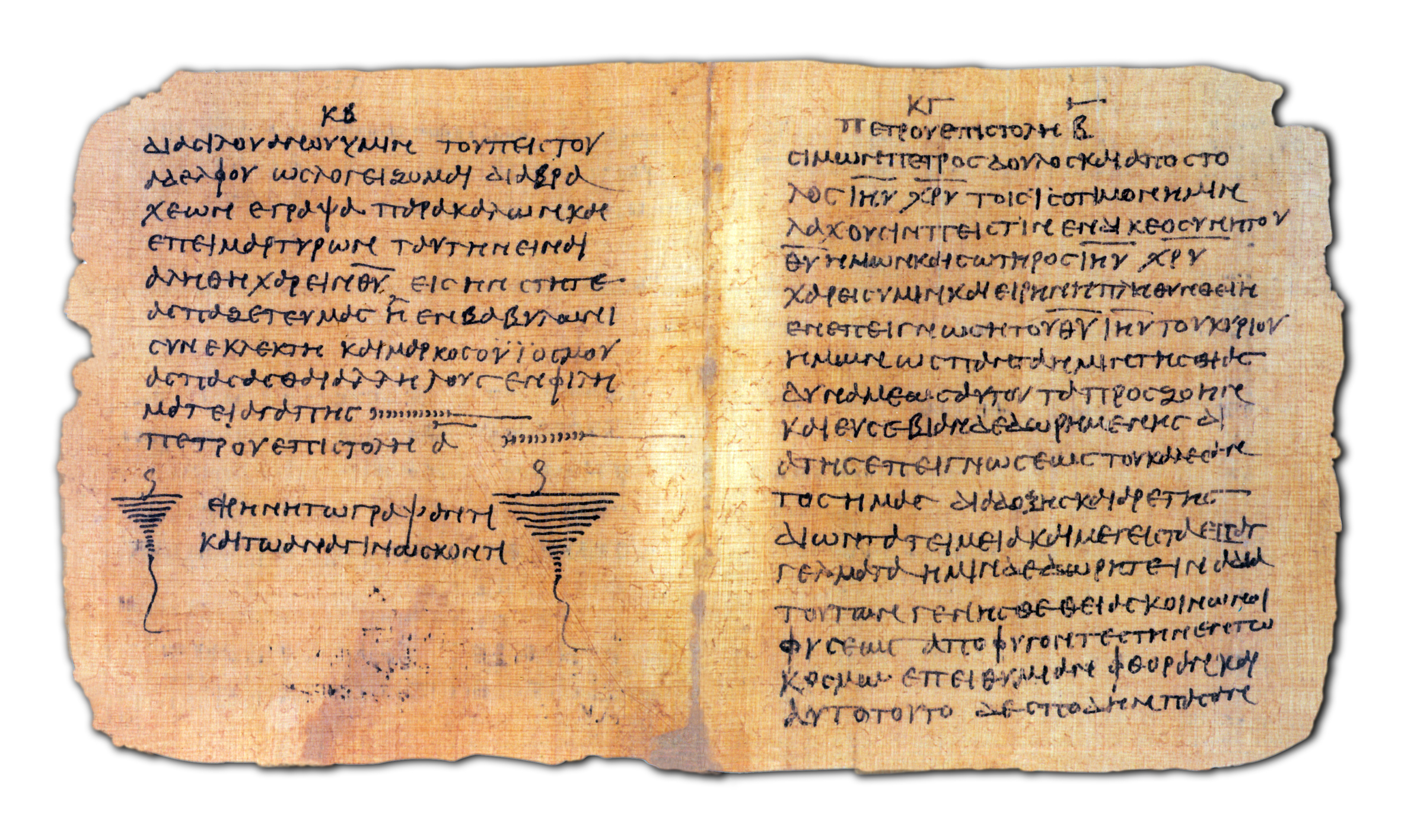
- 1 Peter 5:12–end and 2 Peter 1:1–5 on facing pages of Papyrus 72 (3rd/4th century)
- Book: Second Epistle of Peter
- Category: General epistles
- Christian Bible part: New Testament
- Order in the Christian part: 22

2 Peter 1 is the first chapter of the Second Epistle of Peter in the New Testament of the Christian Bible. The author identifies himself as "Simon Peter, a bondservant and apostle of Jesus Christ" and the epistle is traditionally attributed to Peter the Apostle, but some writers argue that it is the work of Peter's followers in Rome between the years 70 and 100.

== Text ==
The original text was written in Koine Greek. This chapter is divided into 21 verses.

=== Textual witnesses ===
Some early manuscripts containing the text of this chapter are:

Greek

- Papyrus 72 (3rd/4th century)
- Codex Vaticanus (B or 03; 325–50)
- Codex Sinaiticus (א or 01; 330–60)
- Codex Alexandrinus (A or 02; 400–40)
- Codex Ephraemi Rescriptus (C or 04; c. 450; extant verses 2–21)

Latin

- Codex Floriacensis (h; 6th century Old-Latin; extant verses 1–21)

=== Old Testament references ===
- 2 Peter 1,14: Job 21,17

=== Relationship with the Epistle of Jude ===
There is an obvious relationship between the texts of 2 Peter and the Epistle of Jude. The shared passages are:

2 Peter	Jude
1:5	3
1:12	5
2:1	4
2:4	6
2:6	7
2:10–11	8–9
2:12	10
2:13–17	11–13
3:2-3	17–18
3:14	24
3:18	25

== Salutation (1:1–2) ==
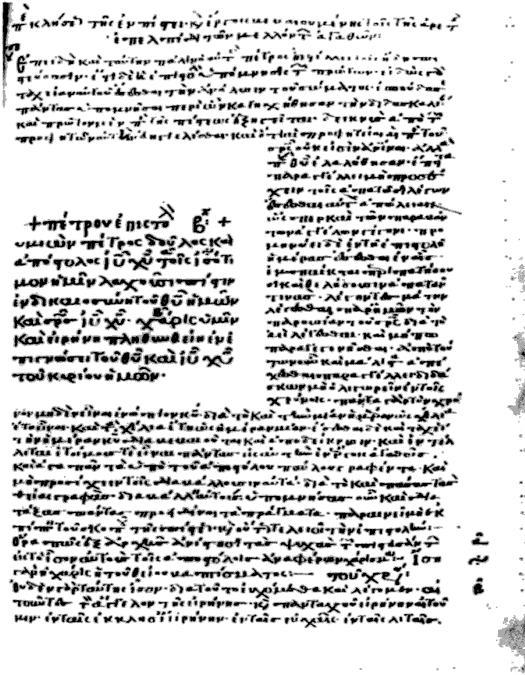
2 Peter 1:1-2 with a commentary in Minuscule 2818.

=== Verse 1 ===
Simon Peter, a servant and an apostle of Jesus Christ, to them that have obtained like precious faith with us through the righteousness of God and Saviour Jesus Christ:

- "Simon" (Biblical Greek: Συμεὼν, Symeōn, a transliteration of the Hebrew name): Acts 15:14, similarly, reads Συμεὼν, Symeōn. The name is used together with "Peter" (as in Matthew 16:16) as a reminder of 'the change grace had brought about in the apostle's life'.
- "A servant and an apostle": 1 Peter 1 uses only the second title, whereas Jude uses the first. The word δοῦλος (doulos) is translated as "bondservant" in the New King James Version. The apostle adopts these titles to emphasize his authority as someone who is merely a slave but fully commissioned by his Master for his work.
- "Obtained" (Greek: λαχοῦσιν, lachousin) or "received", with a meaning of "obtained by lot", implying "grace", not "merit", as the source of this gift.
- "like precious faith" is read as "equally precious" by Johann Bengel, aeque pretiosam in his original Latin, from which he elaborates that "the faith of those who have seen Jesus Christ, as Peter and the rest of the apostles, and of those who believe without having seen Him, [are] equally precious, flowing from Jesus Christ: it lays hold of the same righteousness and salvation".

== A call to spiritual growth (1:3–11) ==
As Christians have obtained the "power" and "promise" for their resources, Peter urges that they "make every effort" (verse 5) to achieve the goal, that is "to grow to be like Jesus", following the steps towards it (verses 5–7):

love

brotherly kindness

godliness

perseverance

self-control

knowledge

goodness

faith

== Reasons for the emphasis (1:12–21) ==
=== Verse 12 ===
Therefore, I will continue to emphasize these things repeatedly, even though you already know them and are well grounded in the truth you possess.

Emphasis is shown through repetition of information already known: Bengel speaks of the writer "emphatically repeat[ing]" his message.

=== Verse 18 ===
And we heard this voice which came from heaven when we were with Him on the holy mountain.

Reference to Transfiguration of Jesus (Matthew 17:1–12; Mark 9:2–13; Luke 9:28–36)

- "The holy mountain": the mountain was sacred because it became 'the scene of a divine revelation' (cf. Exodus 3:5; 19:23).

=== Verse 21 ===
For prophecy never came by the will of man, but holy men of God spoke as they were moved by the Holy Spirit.

The King James Version adds wording, "the prophecy came not in old time". E. H. Plumptre argues against the additional word 'the': "the article before 'prophecy' in the Greek simply gives to the noun the generic sense which is better expressed in English by the absence of the article". Duff relates such 'prophecy' to the Old Testament; Plumptre suggests that the meaning of 'old time' is "wider in its range than the English words, and takes in the more recent as well as the more distant past, and is therefore [also] applicable to the prophecies of the Christian ... Church".

== See also ==
- Transfiguration of Jesus
- Saint Peter
- Jesus Christ
- Related Bible parts: Matthew 17, Mark 7, Luke 9, Hebrews 11

== Sources ==
- Callan, Terrance (2004). "Use of the Letter of Jude by the Second Letter of Peter". Biblica. 85: 42–64.
- Duff, Jeremy (2007). "78. 2 Peter". In Barton, John; Muddiman, John (eds.). The Oxford Bible Commentary (1st pbk. ed.). Oxford University Press. pp. 1270–74. ISBN 978-0-19927718-6.
- Robinson, Alexandra (2017). Jude on the Attack: A Comparative Analysis of the Epistle of Jude, Jewish Judgement Oracles, and Greco-Roman Invective. The Library of New Testament Studies. Bloomsbury Publ. ISBN 978-0-56767879-9.
- Wheaton, David H. (1994). "2 Peter". In Carson, D. A.; France, R. T.; Motyer, J. A.; Wenham, G. J. (eds.). New Bible Commentary: 21st Century Edition (4, ill., repr., rev. ed.). Inter-Varsity Press. pp. 1386–96. ISBN 978-0-85110648-9.
