= Epistle of Jude =

Book of the New Testament

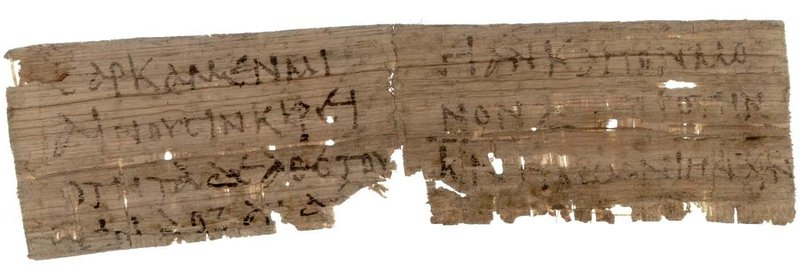
Jude 4, 8 on Papyrus 78 (c. AD 300)

The Epistle of Jude (Note: Ancient Greek: Ἰούδας, romanized: Ioúdas (Judas). The name of the work is usually called the shorter "Jude" variant to distinguish the author from Judas Iscariot. The work is also called the Letter of Jude, or simply Jude, which is also its most common form of abbreviation.) is the penultimate book of the New Testament and of the Christian Bible. The Epistle of Jude claims authorship by Jude, identified as a servant of Jesus and brother of James (and possibly Jesus), though there is scholarly debate about his exact identity, literacy, and the letter's date. It was most likely written in the late first century, with some considering its authorship pseudepigraphical.

Jude urges believers to defend the faith against false teachers and warns of their destructive consequences by recalling examples of divine judgment on the unbelieving and rebellious. He encourages steadfastness in God's love despite scoffers, uses vivid imagery to describe these opponents, and supports his message by quoting the Book of Enoch. The Epistle of Jude references both canonical books like Zechariah and non-canonical works such as the Book of Enoch and the Assumption of Moses, indicating its author's familiarity with a range of writings. The Epistle of Jude condemns vague opponents—variously interpreted as rebellious leaders, heretics rejecting divine or ecclesiastical authority, proto-Gnostics, or critics of Pauline teachings—but their exact identity remains uncertain due to the epistle's ambiguous and limited descriptions. The Epistle of Jude, a brief, combative, and impassioned letter of 25 verses, was likely intended as a circular letter to Jewish Christians familiar with Hebrew Bible and Enochian references. It concludes with a doxology.

The one aspect of the potential ideology discussed in the letter is that these opponents denigrate angels and their role. If this was indeed a part of the ideology of this group the author opposed, then the epistle is possibly a counterpoint to the Epistle to the Colossians. Colossians condemns those who give angels undue prominence and worship them; this implies the two letters might be part of an early Christian debate on Christian angelology. The phrase "heap abuse on celestial beings" may reflect early Christian tensions between more Jewish-aligned figures like James and Jude and the Pauline tradition, which emphasized believers' authority over angels and rejected strict adherence to Jewish law.

Many scholars believe that the strong similarities between Jude and 2 Peter—particularly in 2 Peter 2 and Jude 4–18—indicate that one borrowed from the other or both used a common source, with most favoring Jude as the earlier text, though conservative objections exist. The Epistle of Jude was disputed but gradually accepted as canonical by most churches by the late second century, despite early doubts about its authorship and content due to its rare citation and use of apocryphal sources. Its formal inclusion in the New Testament canon was solidified by the late fourth century.

== Authorship ==
The epistle introduces itself with a simple claim of authorship: "Jude, a servant of Jesus Christ and brother of James". "James" is generally taken to mean James, brother of Jesus, a prominent leader in the early church. Introductions would typically refer to a father in the era, so the use of a brother suggests that this would only be done if the brother was famous within the community. Little is known about Jude himself. As the brother of James, it has traditionally meant Jude was also a brother of Jesus, since James is described as being the brother of Jesus. This is why Clement of Alexandria (c. 150–215 AD) wrote in his work "Comments on the Epistle of Jude" that Jude, the author, was a son of Joseph and a brother of Jesus. However, there is a dispute as to whether "brother" means someone who has the same father and mother, or a half-brother, cousin, or more distant familial relationship. This dispute over the true meaning of "brother" grew as the doctrine of the Virgin Birth evolved. For example, Saint Jerome believed that not only Mary but also Joseph were virgins their entire lives, and thus James and by extension Jude were cousins.

Outside the book of Jude, a "Jude" is mentioned five times in the New Testament: three times as Jude the Apostle, and twice as Jude the brother of Jesus (aside from references to Judas Iscariot and Judah, the son of the patriarch Jacob). Debate continues as to whether the author of the epistle is the apostle, the brother of Jesus, both, or neither. Scholars have argued that since the author of the letter has not identified himself as an apostle and also refers to the apostles as a third party, he cannot be identified with Jude the Apostle. Other scholars have drawn the opposite conclusion, which is that, as an apostle, he would not have made a claim of apostleship on his own behalf. Scholars who have defended the authorship of the brother of James as plausible include Richard Bauckham.

A reason to doubt that a relative of Jesus wrote the book is that they are unlikely to have been literate. Jesus's family were common laborers from Aramaic-speaking Galilee, and literary composition skills were overwhelmingly concentrated in the elite in antiquity. Few knew how to read, fewer how to write, and fewer still how to write complicated literary treatises. Jesus himself may have been able to read, presumably in Hebrew, but he was also exceptional and the star of the family. Even if somehow Jude had learned a little of how to read Hebrew, the epistle is written in excellent, complicated Koine Greek, with knowledge of common forms of rhetoric and argument of the era, as well as seeming knowledge of the scriptures in Hebrew. All this would be exceptional for a countryside Galilean. Scholars who support the authorship of Jude generally assume that he must have embarked upon extensive travel and missionary work among Hellenized Jews to master Greek as the author did. Ultimately, it is impossible to know more details of Jude's life for sure. One early Christian tradition states that Jude's grandchildren were brought before Emperor Domitian and interrogated; in the story, they defended themselves as not rebels and mere poor laborers eking out what they could from a single patch of land. While the story is clearly apocryphal – Roman emperors did not generally interrogate Galilean peasants – it does suggest that early Christians remembered Jude's family as lower-class laborers, not literate elites.

If the Jude writing the letter was not Jude the Apostle mentioned in the gospels, then he was possibly an unknown Christian who happened to share the name and coincidentally also had a brother named James. A final possibility is that the epistle is pseudepigrapha – that the author intentionally hinted to readers that it was from the more famous Jude, but only as a false attribution to give the letter more authority.

An Early Syriac tradition equated the Apostle Thomas with Judas, the brother of Jesus, and by extension the purported author of Jude.

=== Date ===
The date of composition is not known, but is loosely speculated to be between the years c. 50–110. If the epistle was written by the Jude mentioned in the gospels, that would place it sometime in the early apostolic age of c. 50–70 before the destruction of the Temple in Jerusalem; if the letter reflects "early catholicism" and the beginnings of an organized church, then a date of the last decade of the first century or the early second century (c. 90–110) is indicated; and if the letter is an attack on Gnosticism, then a much later date is indicated, perhaps around 150 AD. Scholars who consider the letter a pseudonymous work generally favor the later dates due to the letter's references to the apostles (as if they lived in the past) and to an authoritative tradition, and because of its competent Greek style. Bo Reicke suggests around 90 AD; Heikki Räisänen concurs and believes that it may have been written at the end of the first century. Bart Ehrman also agrees that toward the end of the first century is the most likely, due to use of certain terminology in ways similar to the pastoral epistles that match a late first century date.

== Content ==
Jude urges his readers to "contend for the faith" which was delivered "once and for all", against "certain intruders [who] have stolen in among you". He warns about false teachers who twist the grace of Christ as a pretext for wantonness. Jude asks the reader to recall how even after the Lord saved his own people out of the land of Egypt, he did not hesitate to destroy those who fell into unbelief, much as he punished the angels who fell from their original exalted status and the inhabitants of Sodom and Gomorrah. He also paraphrases (verse 9) an incident apparently from the Assumption of Moses that has since been lost about Satan and Michael the Archangel quarreling over the body of Moses.

Continuing the analogy from Israel's history, he says that the false teachers have followed in the way of Cain, have rushed after reward into the error of Balaam, and have perished in the rebellion of Korach. He describes in vivid terms the opponents he warns of, calling them "clouds without rain", "trees without fruit", "foaming waves of the sea", and "wandering stars". He exhorts believers to remember the words spoken by the Apostles, using language similar to the second epistle of Peter to answer concerns that the Lord seemed to tarry: "In the last time there will be scoffers, indulging their own ungodly lusts," and to keep themselves in God's love, before delivering a doxology to God.

Jude quotes directly from the Book of Enoch, a widely distributed work among the Old Testament pseudepigrapha, citing a section of 1 Enoch 1:8 that is based on Deuteronomy 33:2.

== Style and audience ==
Consisting of just one chapter with 25 verses, the Epistle of Jude is among the shortest books of the Bible. (Note: Some versions of the New Testament refer to this chapter as "Jude 1".) The Epistle to Philemon also contains 25 verses, while the 21-verse Book of Obadiah (in the Old Testament), the 14-verse 3 John, and the 13-verse 2 John are shorter.

The wording and syntax of this epistle in its original Greek demonstrates that the author was capable and fluent. The epistle's style is combative, impassioned, and rushed. Many examples of evildoers and warnings about their fates are given in rapid succession.

The epistle concludes with a doxology, which is considered by Peter H. Davids to be one of the highest in quality contained in the Bible. Reicke describes it as "grand and soul-stirring".

It may have been composed as an encyclical letter—that is, one not directed to the members of one church in particular, but intended rather to be circulated and read in all churches. While addressed to the Christian Church as a whole, the references to Old Testament figures such as Michael, Cain, and Korah's sons, the Book of Enoch, and the invocation of James as head of the church of Jerusalem suggest a Jewish Christian main audience who would be familiar with Enochian literature and revere James.

== Canonical status ==
The letter of Jude was one of the disputed books of the biblical canon of the New Testament. Despite some opposition, it seems to have been accepted by most churches around the end of the second century. Clement of Alexandria, Tertullian, and the Muratorian canon considered the letter canonical. The letter was eventually accepted as part of the canon by later Church Fathers such as Athanasius of Alexandria. The canon listed by the Council of Carthage (c. 397) included the epistle of Jude.

The first historical record of doubts as to authorship are found in the writings of Origen of Alexandria, who spoke of the doubts held by some in the early third century. Eusebius classified it with the "disputed writings, the antilegomena" in the early fourth century. Eusebius doubted its authenticity, partly because it was rarely quoted among ancient sources, although he acknowledges it was read in many churches. The links between the Epistle and 2 Peter and its use of the biblical apocrypha raised concern: Saint Jerome wrote in 392 AD that the book was "rejected by many" since it quotes the Book of Enoch. Even to the extent that the letter was accepted as canonical and useful, it likely circulated as an independent letter in the 2nd and 3rd centuries; it and the other general epistles only appear to have become part of somewhat standardized collections in manuscripts of the fourth century and afterward.

The oldest surviving versions of the Syriac Peshitta from the 5th- and 6th- centuries do not include Jude; nor 2 John, 3 John, 2 Peter, or Revelation. These works were added to the Syrian canon in the 6th century and afterward.

== Surviving early manuscripts ==
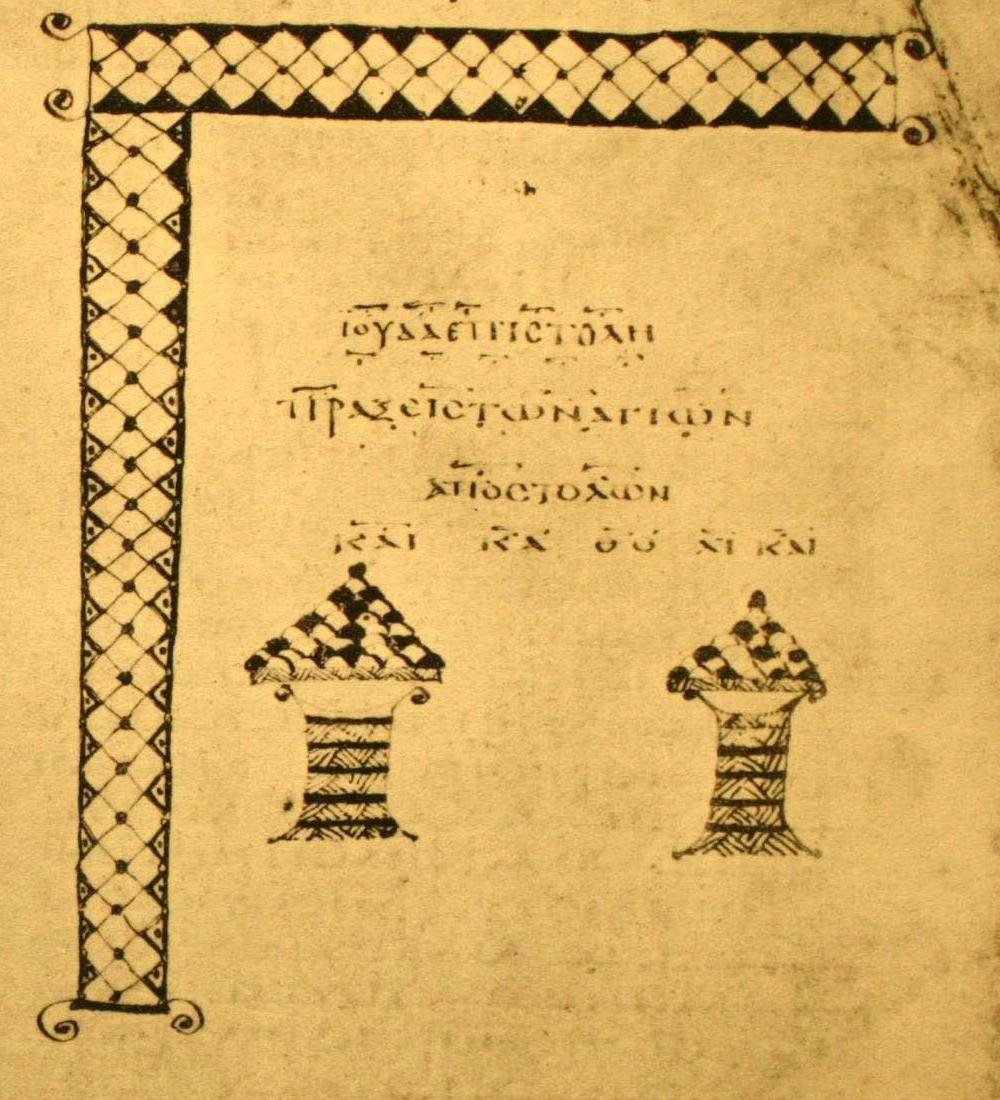
Colophon of the Epistle of Jude in the Codex Alexandrinus

Early manuscripts containing the text of the epistle of Jude include:

- Papyrus 72 (3rd/4th century)
- Papyrus 78 (3rd/4th century; extant verses 4–5, 7–8)
- Codex Vaticanus (B or 03; 325–350)
- Codex Sinaiticus (א or 01; 330–360)
- Codex Alexandrinus (A or 02; 400–440)
- Codex Ephraemi Rescriptus (C or 04; c. 450; extant verses 3–25)

== Identity of the opponents ==
The epistle fiercely condemns the opponents it warns of and declares that God will judge and punish them, despite them being a part of the Christian community. However, the exact nature of these opponents has been a continuing question, as the epistle does not describe them in any more detail than calling them corrupt and ungodly. Several theories have been proposed. The most specific verse describing the opponents is verse 8:

In the very same way, on the strength of their dreams these ungodly people pollute their own bodies, reject authority and heap abuse on celestial beings.

— Jude 1:8 (NIV)

The rejection of "authority" (κυριότητα, kyriotēta; alternative translations include "dominion" or "lordship") could mean several things. The most direct would be rejection of civil or ecclesiastical authority: the opponents were ignoring guidance from leaders. Martin Luther and Jean Calvin agreed with this interpretation, and it is the most common one. Another possibility is that this specifically referred to rejecting the authority of Jesus or God, which would agree with verse 4 and be reinforcing the claim that these opponents are not true Christians.

A third possibility is that "Rejecting authority" may be a reference to Paul's preaching that gentiles did not need to comply with Jewish Law. As James was known to be a major figure among Jewish Christians, this might indicate tension between the more Jewish strands of early Christianity represented by James and Jude set against Paul's message to the gentiles.

A fourth possibility is that kyriotēta is here being used as the singular of kyriotētes (Dominions), a class of angels. This would fit with the final part of the sentence of "heap abuse on celestial beings", but it is unusual that the singular is used. Versions of Jude vary, and some manuscripts such as the Codex Sinaiticus indeed use the plural form.

"Heap abuse on celestial beings" is also a relevant statement, as it stands in some tension with the works of Paul the Apostle as well as the Epistle to the Hebrews. Paul's undisputed works indicate that believers are already on the same level as angels, that all existing powers are subject to Christ, and believers are the future judges of angels. Later writings attributed to Paul such as Colossians and Ephesians go even further, with Colossians decrying the alleged worship of angels. A hypothesis is thus that the author may have been attacking forms of Pauline Christianity that were not suitably deferential to angels in their opinion.

Another hypothesis is that the opponents may have been proto-Gnostics, argued for by scholars such as Hermann Werdermann. Proposed evidence in support of this includes that in verse 19, the opponents are called "worldly" (psychikoi), a term also used in relation to Gnosticism in other literature. While it does seem that Jude may have been used to attack Gnostics in later centuries, other scholars think this was unlikely to be the original intent, as the opponents are not described as having the signature doctrines of Gnosticism, and Gnosticism does not seem to have been a major force in first century Christianity. Richard Bauckham, arguing against such a connection, writes that "If [Jude]'s polemic is really aimed against Gnosticism it is singularly inept."

The inherent vagueness of the epistle means that the identities of these opponents may never be known.

== Similarity to 2 Peter ==
Shared passages
| 2 Peter | Jude |
|---|---|
| 1:5 | 3 |
| 1:12 | 5 |
| 2:1 | 4 |
| 2:4 | 6 |
| 2:6 | 7 |
| 2:10–11 | 8–9 |
| 2:12 | 10 |
| 2:13–17 | 11–13 |
| 3:2-3 | 17–18 |
| 3:14 | 24 |
| 3:18 | 25 |

Part of Jude is very similar to 2 Peter (mainly 2 Peter chapter 2); so much so that most scholars agree that either one letter used the other directly, or they both drew on a common source. Comparing the Greek text portions of 2 Peter 2:1–3:3 (426 words) to Jude 4–18 (311 words) results in 80 words in common and 7 words of substituted synonyms.

Because this epistle is much shorter than 2 Peter, and due to various stylistic details, most scholars consider Jude the source for the similar passages of 2 Peter. 2 Peter omits the reference to the non-canonical book of Enoch, or apocalyptic Jewish works in general; perhaps an indication of shifting attitudes of the early 2nd century, in the view where 2 Peter came later.

Advocates of the reverse are generally traditionalists who assign an early date to 2 Peter, such that it was published during Peter's lifetime. They argue that Jude 18 quotes 2 Peter 3:3 as past tense, and consider Jude to have come after 2 Peter.

== References to other books ==
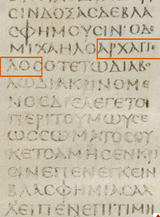
Jude 9 on Codex Sinaiticus (c. 330–360)

The Epistle of Jude references at least three other books, with two (Book of Zechariah and 2 Peter) being canonical in all churches, and the other (Book of Enoch) non-canonical in most churches.

Verse 9 refers to a dispute between Michael the Archangel and the devil about the body of Moses. Some interpreters understand this reference to be an allusion to the events described in Zechariah 3:1–2. The classical theologian Origen, as well as Clement of Alexandria, Didymus the Blind, and others, attributes this reference to the non-canonical Assumption of Moses. However, no extant copies of the Assumption of Moses contain this story, leading most scholars to conclude the section covering this dispute has been lost – perhaps a lost ending, since a story involving Moses's body would logically occur at the end. Some scholars disagree; James Charlesworth argues that the Assumption of Moses never contained any such content, and other ancient Church writers supported a different origin.

Verses 14–15 contain a direct quotation of a prophecy from 1 Enoch 1:9. The title "Enoch, the seventh from Adam" is also sourced from 1 En. 60:1. Most commentators assume that this indicates that Jude accepts the antediluvian patriarch Enoch as the author of the Book of Enoch which contains the same quotation. An alternative explanation is that Jude quotes the Book of Enoch aware that verses 14–15 are an expansion of the words of Moses from Deuteronomy 33:2.

The Book of Enoch is not considered canonical by most churches, although it is by the Ethiopian Orthodox church. According to Western scholars, the older sections of the Book of Enoch (mainly in the Book of the Watchers) date from about 300 BC and the latest part (Book of Parables) probably was composed at the end of the 1st century BC. 1 Enoch 1:9, mentioned above, is part of the pseudepigrapha and is among the Dead Sea Scrolls [4Q Enoch (4Q204[4QENAR]) COL I 16–18]. It is largely accepted by scholars that the author of the Epistle of Jude was familiar with the Book of Enoch and was influenced by it in thought and diction. The reference to fallen angels suggests the possibility the author was familiar with related literature to Enoch such as the Book of Jubilees and 2 Baruch as well.

The epistle also closely mirrors the Epistle of James, with many similar sentences and borrowed phrases.

== Influence ==
In general, Jude did not have much influence in later Christianity, not appearing often in sermons preached to laypeople nor in treatises by Christian theologians. The Baptist preacher Charles Spurgeon used verse 19 as his text for at least one sermon. In Catholic theology, the words of verse 3, "once and for all", form part of the approach to sacred tradition set out in the Second Vatican Council's declaration that "what was handed on by the Apostles includes everything which contributes toward the holiness of life and increase in faith of the peoples of God".

Douglas Rowston, an Australian New Testament scholar, observed in 1971 that "Only its benediction may be familiar to an average churchgoer" and that "New Testament theologians have ignored the book". The Presbyterian writer Hywel Jones later observed that since Rowston's article was published, a "flurry" of academic studies of the letter emerged.

== See also ==
- Textual variants in the Epistle of Jude

== Bibliography ==
- Aland, Kurt; Aland, Barbara (1987) [1981]. The Text of the New Testament: An Introduction to the Critical Editions and to the Theory and Practice of Modern Textual Criticism. Translated by Rhodes, Erroll F. Grand Rapids: William B. Eerdmans. ISBN 978-0-8028-4098-1.
- Bauckham, Richard J. (1983). Jude, 2 Peter. Word Biblical Commentary. Vol. 50. Waco, Texas: Word Books. ISBN 0-8499-0249-5.
- Davids, Peter H. (2006). The Pillar New Testament Commentary: The Letters of 2 Peter and Jude. Grand Rapids, Michigan: Eerdmans.
- Donelson, Lewis R. (2013) [2010]. I & II Peter and Jude: A Commentary. The New Testament Library. Westminster John Knox. ISBN 978-0-664-23980-0.
- Neyrey, Jerome H. (1993). 2 Peter, Jude: A New Translation With Introduction And Commentary. The Anchor Bible. Vol. 37C. New York: Doubleday. ISBN 0-385-41362-9.
- Reicke, Bo (1964). The Epistles of James, Peter, and Jude (1 ed.). Garden City, New York: Doubleday & Company, Inc. LCCN 63-8221.
- Robinson, Alexandra (2017). Jude on the Attack: A Comparative Analysis of the Epistle of Jude, Jewish Judgement Oracles, and Greco-Roman Invective. The Library of New Testament Studies. Bloomsbury Publishing. ISBN 978-0567678799.

Epistle of Jude General Epistle
| Preceded by Third John | New Testament; Books of the Bible | Succeeded by Revelation |
