= Codex Floriacensis =

6th-century Latin manuscript of the New Testament

The Codex Floriacensis, designated by h in traditional system or by 55 in the Beuron system, is a 6th-century Latin manuscript of the New Testament. The text, written on vellum, is a palimpsest. Another name of the manuscript is Fleury Palimpsest or Palimpsestus Floriacensis. It is one of the eight Old-Latin manuscripts with text of Apocalypse.

== Description ==
The manuscript contains the text of the New Testament except the four Gospels and the Pauline epistles with numerous lacunae. 33 parchment leaves from the original 193 have survived. The size of the pages is 24 by 18 cm.

The order of books (probably): Book of Revelation, Book of Acts, 1-2 Peter, and 1 John.

The Latin text of the codex represents the Old-Latin version in Afra recension.

Contents

Revelation 1:1-2:1; 8:7-9:12; 11:16-12:5; 12:6-14; 14:15-16:5; Acts 3:2-4:18; 5:23-7:2; 7:42-8:2; 9:4-23; 14:5-23; 17:34-18:19; 23:8-24; 26:2-27:13; 1 Peter 4:17-5:14; 2 Peter 1:1-2:6; 1 John 1:8-3:20.

It contains many scribal errors. The text of Acts 28:1-13 is summarized. In Book of Acts there are only 10 differences with the text of Acts quoted in the Testimonia of Cyprian. There are also some textual similarities with Codex Glazier.

== History ==
Gregory dated the manuscript to the 7th century, Bruce M. Metzger to the 5th century.

It is a palimpsest, the upper later text contains various treatises of Boetius and Isidore of Seville.

According to the inscription on folio 130 it belonged in the 11th century to the famous Benedictine Abbey of Fleury on the Loire (hence name of the codex).

The text of the codex was examined by Constantin von Tischendorf (text of Apocalypse), Hans von Soden examined the text of the Acts, Edgar S. Buchanan examined the text of the Apocalypse and Acts. Sabatier collated the first three pages. Johannes Belsheim published some fragments in 1887, and Samuel Berger published a complete text of the codex in 1889.

The codex is located in the Bibliothèque nationale de France (Lat. 6400 G) at Paris.

== See also ==
- List of New Testament Latin manuscripts
