= Papyrus 78 =

Papyrus 𝔓^{78}
- New Testament manuscript
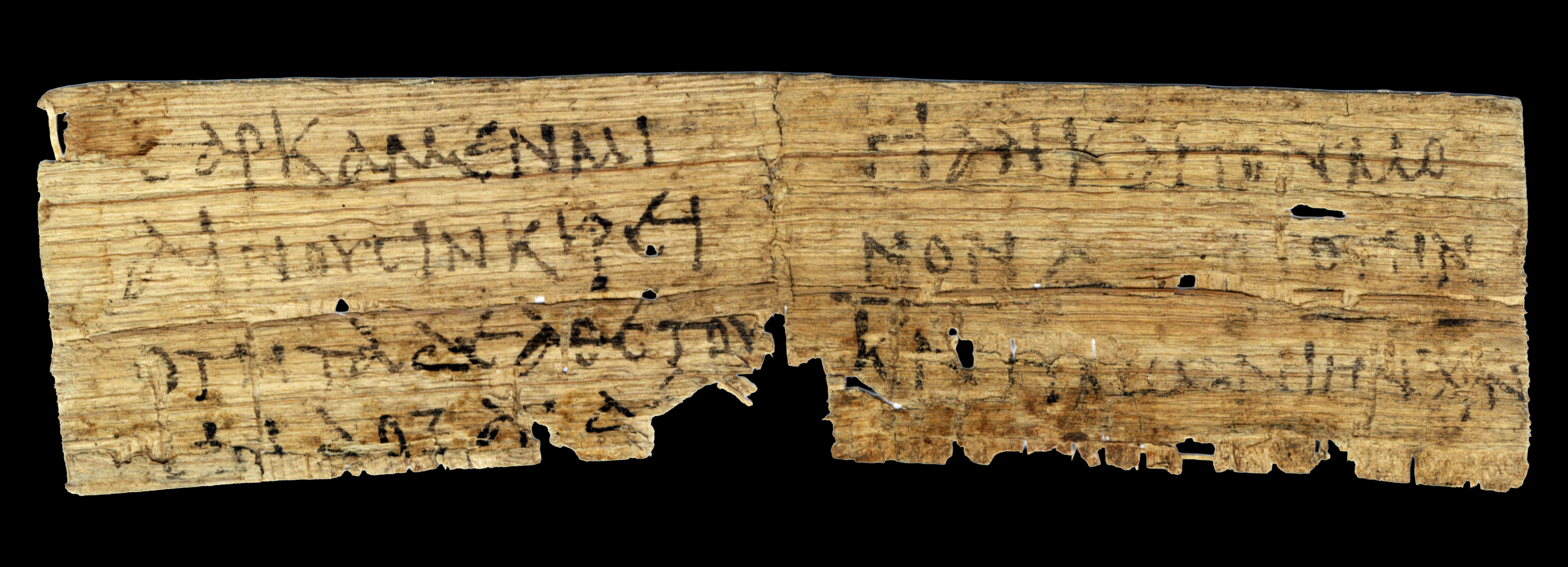
- Recto, Jude 1:4; 1:8
- Name: P. Oxy. 2684
- Text: Jude †
- Date: c. 200-400
- Script: Greek
- Found: Egypt
- Now at: Sackler Library
- Cite: L. Ingrams, P. Kingston, P. Parsons, and J. Rea, OP XXXIV (1968), pp. 4-6.
- Type: Alexandrian text-type
- Category: I

Papyrus 78, also known as P. Oxy. XXXVI 2684, is an early copy of the New Testament in Greek. It is a papyrus manuscript of the Epistle of Jude. It is designated by the siglum 𝔓^{78} in the Gregory-Aland numbering of New Testament manuscripts. The surviving texts of Jude are verses 4–5 & 7–8. 𝔓^{78} is written in an elegant hand. Using the study of comparative writing styles (paleography), it has been assigned to the 3rd or 4th century CE.

== Description ==
Text

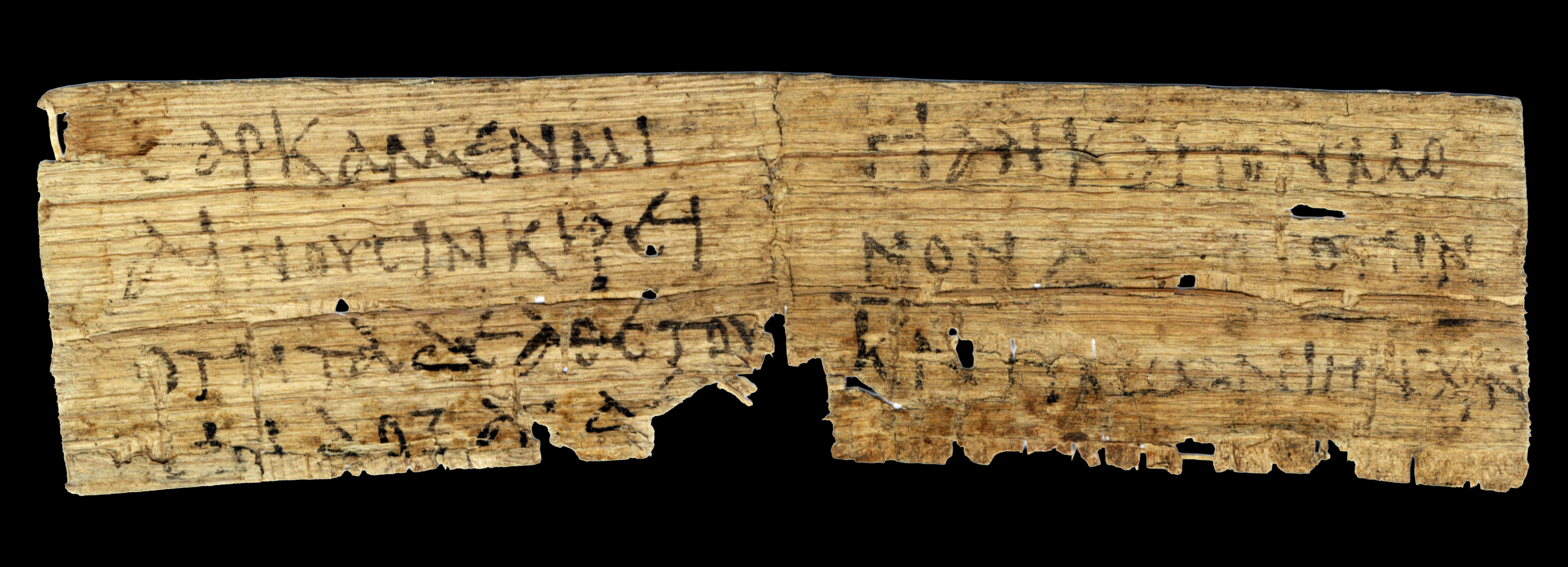
Verso, Jude 1:4, 1:8

The Greek text of this codex is considered a representative of the Alexandrian text-type. 𝔓^{78} displays a free text. Due to its early date, Biblical scholar Kurt Aland placed it in Category I of his New Testament classification system..

Present location

It is currently housed at the Sackler Library (P. Oxy. 2684) in Oxford.

Textual variants
v5: Addition of αδελφοι (brothers) after βουλομαι (I plan).
v7: υπεχουσαι (undergoing) becomes επεχουσαι (holding fast to).
v8: ουτοι (these) becomes αυτοι (themselves).
v8: δοξας (plural: glories) becomes δοξαν (singular: glory).

== See also ==
- List of New Testament papyri
- Oxyrhynchus Papyri
