= Bo Reicke =

Swedish biblical scholar

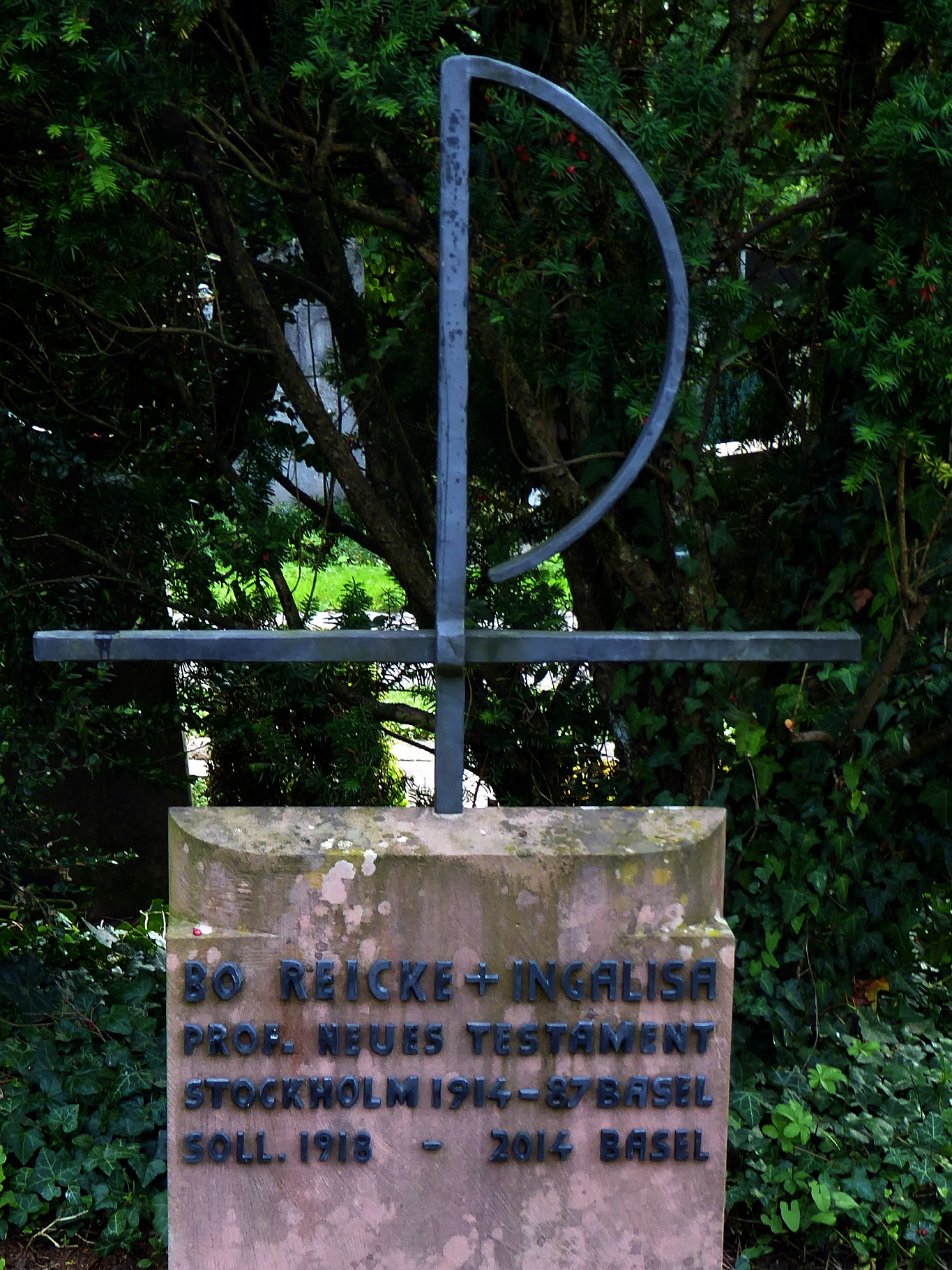
Grave at the Wolfgottesacker Cemetery in Basel, Switzerland

Bo Ivar Reicke (Stockholm, 31 July 1914 – 1987) was a Swedish biblical scholar. He graduated from the University of Uppsala as Master of Philosophy in 1938 and Master of Theology in 1941, in which year he was also ordained in the Evangelical Lutheran Church of Sweden. He received his doctorate in theology in 1946 and became associate professor on the Uppsala Faculty. From 1953 to 1984, Reicke was professor of New Testament at the University of Basel.

== Works ==
- The Disobedient Spirits & Christian Baptism: A Study of 1 Peter 3:19
- Re-Examining Paul's Letters: the History of the Pauline Correspondence
- New Testament Era: The World of the Bible from 500 B.C. to A.D. 100
- The Roots of the Synoptic Gospels
- The Gospel of Luke
- The Epistles of James, Peter, and Jude
- Traces of Gnosticism in the Dead Sea Scrolls?
- Body and Soul in the New Testament. Studia Theologica: Nordic Journal of Theology, (19) 1-2: 200-212.
- "The constitution of the primitive church in the light of Jewish documents / Bo Reicke" in Stendahl Krister. The Scrolls and the New Testament. Greenwood Press 1975, 1957.
- B. Reicke, "Remarques sur l'histoire de la forme (Formgeschichte) des textes de Qumran," in Les Manuscrits de la Mer Morte. Colloque de Strasbourg 25-27 Mai 1955 (ed. J. Danielou; Paris: Presses Universitaires de France, 1957), 37-44, esp. 4iff.
