= Greek inscriptions =

IG Dedication of Ion of Chios to Athena

The Greek-language inscriptions and epigraphy are a major source for understanding of the society, language and history of ancient Greece and other Greek-speaking or Greek-controlled areas. Greek inscriptions may occur on stone slabs, pottery ostraca, ornaments, and range from simple names to full texts.

== Inscriptiones Graecae ==
The Inscriptiones Graecae (IG), Latin for Greek inscriptions, project is an academic project originally begun by the Prussian Academy of Science, and today continued by its successor organisation, the Berlin-Brandenburgische Akademie der Wissenschaften. Its aim is to collect and publish all known ancient inscriptions from the ancient world. As such it will eventually make all other previous collections redundant.

It is divided by regions.

I/II/III - Attica

IV - Aegina, Pityonesus, Cecryphalia, the Argolid

V - Laconia, Messenia and Arcadia

VII - Megarid, Oropus, and Boeotia

IX - Aetolia, Acarnania, West Locris and Thessaly

X - Epirus, Macedonia, Thrace, Scythia, Thessalonica, Lyncestis, Heraclea, Pelagonia, Derriopus and Lychnidus

XIV - Sicily-Italy

== Other printed collections ==
Numerous other printed collections of Greek inscriptions exist. The following abbreviations are as listed in the preface Epigraphical Publications to the Liddell-Scott-Jones lexicon:

- CGIH = Corpus der griechisch-christlichen Inschriften von Hellas: I. Die griechisch-christlichen Inschriften des Peloponnes, Nikos Athanasiou Bees, vol. i, Athens 1941.
- CID = Corpus des inscriptions de Delphes. I: Lois sacrées et règlements religieux, Georges Rougemont, Paris 1977; II: Les comptes du quatrième et du troisième siècle, J. Bousquet, D. Mulliez, Paris 1989.
- CIJud. = Corpus Inscriptionum Iudaicarum, ed. Jean-Baptiste Frey: vol. i (Europe), Rome 1936 repr. [New York 1975]; vol. ii: Asie-Afrique, Rome 1952.
- CISem. = Corpus Inscriptionum Semiticarum, E Renan et al., Paris 1881–1951.
- Inscr.Perg. = Die Inschriften von Pergamon (in Altertümer von Pergamon viii), ed. Max Fränkel, Berlin 1890–1895; 8(3) = Altertümer von Pergamon viii (3). Die Inschriften des Asklepieions, Christian Habicht (historian), Berlin 1969.
- Supp.Epigr. = SEG Supplementum Epigraphicum Graecum, Hondius, Netherlands

== Online collections ==
Over the last 20 years, a growing number of online databases, catalogues and corpora of Greek inscriptions have been created. A selection is offered below:

- Searchable Greek Inscriptions of the Packard Humanities Institute, including the complete Inscriptiones Graecae corpora
- Inscriptiones Graecae homepage, in German
- Attic Inscriptions Online, including English translations
- Inscriptions of Aphrodisias, including English translations
- Hellenistic Greek Inscriptions, in English translation
- I.Sicily, inscriptions of Sicily
- Monumenta Asiae Minoris Antiqua (MAMA) XI, monuments from Phrygia and Lykaonia
- IGCyr, Inscriptions of Greek Cyrenaica
- EAGLE, a portal to the inscriptions of the Ancient World, part of IDEA

Some other inscriptions are found incidentally in

- TLG text materials are available online and in CD ROM format
- Perseus project
- Duke Data Bank of Documentary Papyri

== Digital resources ==
Alongside the development of online collections of Greek inscriptions, several projects have created online epigraphic tools for the study of inscriptions.

- Epigraphy.info, collaborative environment for digital epigraphy
- Trismegistos, portal of papyrological and epigraphical resources
- LGPN, the Lexicon of Greek Personal Names
- EpiDoc, XML text markup for ancient documents
- Ubi Erat Lupa, image database on ancient stone monuments
- Europeana EAGLE, Europeana network of Ancient Greek and Latin Epigraphy
- Digital Epigraphy Toolbox, 3D digitization of inscriptions
- Krateros, digital repository for the collections of epigraphic squeezes
- GIO, translations of Ancient Greek inscriptions into Modern Greek
- Pythia (machine learning), a deep learning model for the automatic restoration of Greek inscriptions

== See also ==
- Académie des Inscriptions et Belles-Lettres
- Centre for Ancient Epigraphy and Numismatics "Fanoula Papazoglou"
- EpiDoc
- Epigraphy & (Section:Greek Inscriptions)
- Leiden Conventions
- Pre-Islamic Arabian inscriptions
- Pythia (machine learning)
