= The Vision of Dorotheus =

4th-century Greek Christian epic poem, where the narrator is transported to Heaven

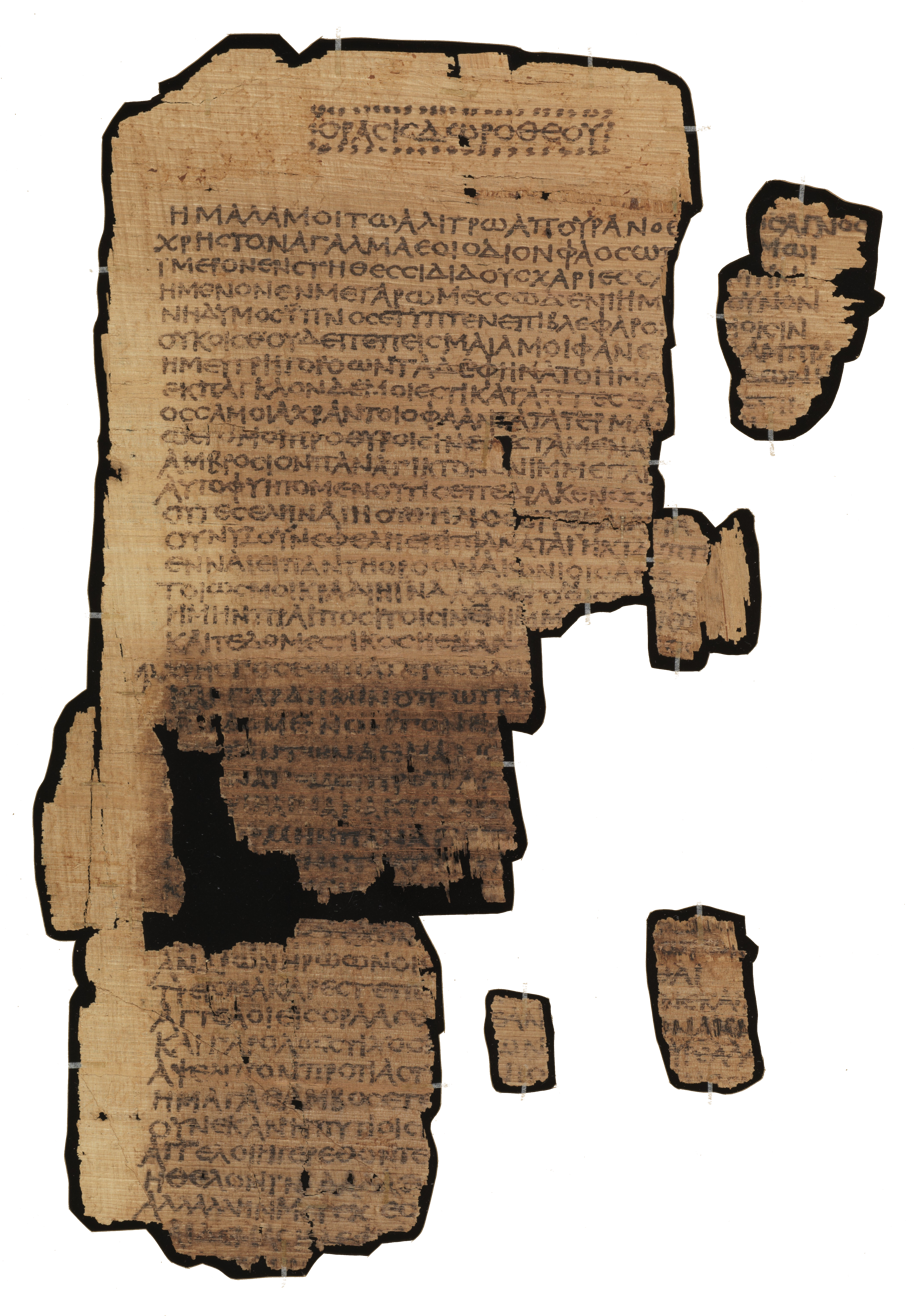
First page of the Bodmer Papyrus of the Vision of Dorotheus, containing lines 1–41

The Vision of Dorotheus or Dorotheos (Ancient Greek: Όρασις Δωροθέου, romanized: Órasis Dorothéou) is an autobiographical Homeric Greek poem in 343 lines of dactylic hexameter, attributed to "Dorotheus, son of Quintus the Poet". The poem chronicles a vision, wherein the author is transported to the Kingdom of Heaven and finds himself in its military hierarchy. He is conscripted into and deserts his post, only to receive punishment, be forgiven, and rediscover his Christian faith. The poem, penned sometime in the 4th-century, depicts the Kingdom of Heaven in an Imperial fashion; Christ is enthroned as a Roman emperor, surrounded by angels bearing Roman military and official titles (such as domestikos, praipositos, primikerios, and ostiarios), with the military structures of the Kingdom of Heaven modelled on those of Rome.

The Vision of Dorotheus survives as one of the earliest examples of Christian hexametric poetry. While the Vision's poetic merit has been criticised, its poet being described by Vian (1985) as having been "satisfied with a superficial epic varnish" and its faults denoting "an amateur who had not received a solid academic training"; the value of its insight into early Christianity has been noted, Livrea (1986) claiming that such a text "should arouse a burning interest", "even in the eyes of the most superficial reader" and Kessels & Van Der Horst (1987) noting its status as a "unique, autobiographic early Christian poem", giving "much food for reflection to scholars in the fields of patristics, history of religion, classics, and also psychology of religion". Much scholarship has been written concerning the Vision, considering its meaning and its provenance.

The poem is extant in a unique papyrus codex of the 4th/5th-century, as part of the Bodmer Papyri, under the signature "Papyrus Bodmer 29" in the Bodmer Library. The papyrus has taken on some damage, with its many lacunae leaving only 22 lines to survive fully. This papyrus codex of 22 folios, otherwise known as the Codex of Visions, records the Vision on 9 pages, alongside several other early Christian works.

== Authorship ==
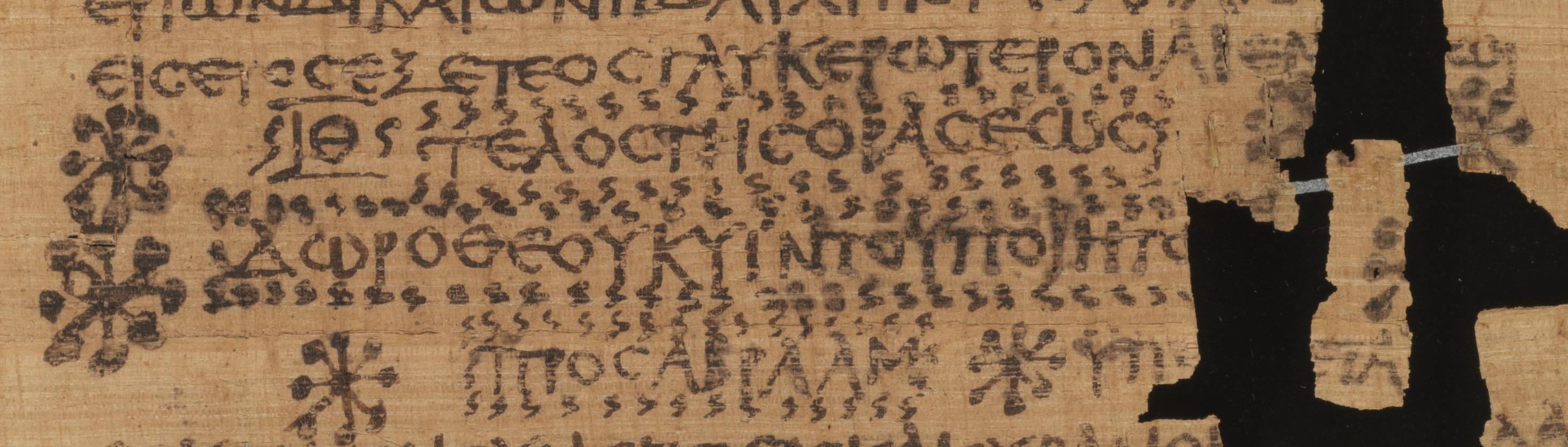
The Vision's postscript, a Greek creed followed by the identification of the author, "Δωροθέου Κυΐντου ποιητοῦ".

On the final page of the transcript of the work, after a brief credal affirmation of "Jesus is God" ("ἸΘ", abbreviating "Ἰησοῦς Θεòς"), the author is identified with the postscript: "τέλος τἦς ὁράσεως // Δωροθέου Κυΐντου ποιητοῦ". Kessels & Van Der Horst (1987) translate this as "End of the vision // of Dorotheus, son of Quintus the poet". This name is identified again in the text, in line 300 where he is identified as "Dorotheus, son of Quintus" by those in Christ's court. There is some ambiguity as to these translations, as the original Greek in the postscript does not use a patronymic for Quintus (therefore not disambiguating between "the poet Dorotheus Quintus" and "Dorotheus, son of Quintus the poet"). According to Kessels & Van Der Horst (1987) and James & Lee (2000) the earlier usage of a patronymic in line 300 establishes the latter translation. This has been contested by Livrea (1986) who argues this is only evidence of the copyist's misunderstanding of the patronymic, and further by Agosti & Gonnelli (1995) who claims that, by this period, the patronymic had lost its parental significance.

Hurst, Reverdin & Rudhardt (1984) have interpreted the text autobiographically, suggesting Dorotheus was a Christian of the 4th-century with imperial connections who, during the Diocletianic Persecution of 303–313, attempted to suppress his own faith for fear of persecution. The vision, then, reminds Dorotheus of his baptism and promise to God, accepting his faith and becoming a Christian confessor. Similarly, through textual interpretation, Bremmer (2002) suggests that Dorotheus had some literary training, evinced by his quotations of Homer, Hesiod, and Apollonius and use of some obscure Greek words (which are only found elsewhere in Hesychius's lexicon).

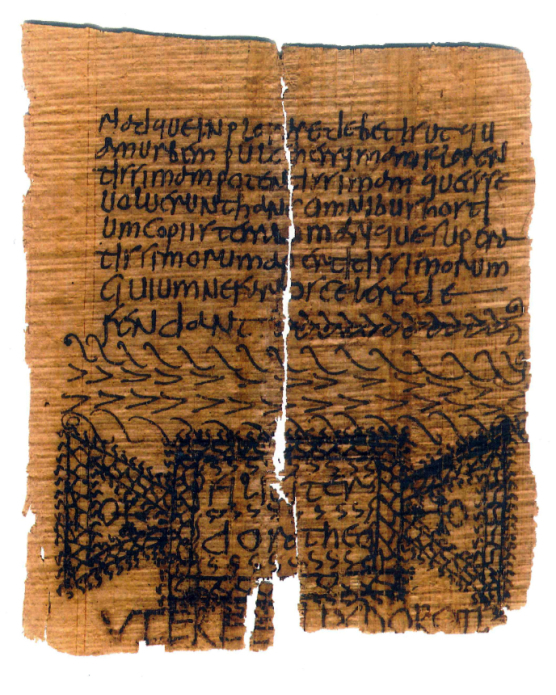
The Cicero dedication to Dorotheus.

This Dorotheus has been identified, by Hurst, Reverdin & Rudhardt (1984), with two Dorothei mentioned by Eusebius in his Historia Ecclesiastica. Firstly, an Antioch priest of the 290s who had knowledge of Hebrew and Greek with strong connections to the Emperor and his court (Hist. Eccl. VII, 32, 2–4). Secondly, a Christian Dorotheus, who worked in the royal household and committed suicide after the Diocletianic Persecution (Hist. Eccl. VIII, 1, 4 & 6, 5). There is no concrete evidence to link these two Dorothei together, nor to link these Dorothei to the Dorotheus who is identified as the Vision's author, but it has been considered "a reasonable guess" by Kessels & Van Der Horst (1987), even if it is merely "conjectural". (Note: In the Prosopography of the Later Roman Empire, three other Dorothei are attested - an Egyptian grammarian (late-4th-cent. CE), a poet praised by Libanius (fl. 365 CE), and a tribunus equitum of Faiyum (fl. 359 CE) - though both Hurst, Reverdin & Rudhardt (1984) and Kessels & Van Der Horst (1987) dismiss these Dorothei as improbable candidates (even the poet, as the unconverted pagan Libanius would be unlikely to praise a Christian poet).)

In identifying Dorotheus' father, "Quintus", Hurst, Reverdin & Rudhardt (1984), Kessels & Van Der Horst (1987) and James & Lee (2000) have suggested the Greek epic poet Quintus Smyrnaeus. There exists no other recorded poet Quintus during this period, and Quintus' poetry was well known and respected, so Dorotheus would have had motive to identify himself with him. The Homeric hexametric style of Dorotheus is identical to that used by Quintus in his Posthomerica. The dating of Quintus' life, though controversial, traditionally puts him from the mid-3rd to the early-4th-century, which would fit with the dating of the poem to the 4th century. This identification is troubled by the fact that Quintus was a Roman pagan, and that many of the metric mistakes made by Dorotheus are not present in the writings of Quintus. The "solid academic training" and "good Homeric culture" of Quintus, according to Vian (1985), apparently did not pass down to the "superficial" and "shameless" Dorotheus. Agosti & Gonnelli (1995) have gone further, to scrutinize the parallels between the text of the Vision and Quintus' Posthomerica, claiming only two similarities in the texts (Note: Those being Vision, 132 & PH, 10.31 and Vision, 325 & PH, 4.263.) which they take as evidence against a close relationship between the two authors. This claim has been criticised by James & Lee (2000), asserting that Dorotheus' declaration of poetic inspiration (340-1) (Note: Throughout this page, the numbers in brackets refer to the lines of the poem, as enumerated in Kessels & Van Der Horst (1987).) bears much resemblance to that of Quintus in Posthomerica 12.308.

In the Barcelona Papyrus (Also known as the P.Monts.Roca inv. 149), a papyrus codex with texts in Greek and Latin, there are two mentions of a "dorotheo" in two dedications (at the end of Cicero's Catiline Orations and a story of Hadrian, both in Latin). The Cicero dedication is a Latin tabula ansata, containing the words "filiciter // dorotheo", below which is the text "UTERE [F]ELIX DOROTH[EE]"; similarly, the Hadrian dedication is a bilingual tabula ansata, with an inscription of "ⲉⲡⲁⲅⲁⲑⲱ" (ἐπ’ ἀγαθῷ in the majuscule Coptic alphabet) and "filiciter // dorotheo". The Barcelona Papyrus was probably also part of the Egyptian Bodmer Papyri find, so there is a possibility (though it is slim, as Dorotheus was a common name in this period) that this Dorotheus is the same the author of the Vision.

== Date ==
From afar the men looked at me in astonishment
seeing how big I was and that I did not have simple clothing,
but a cloak, when I was standing at the gate as before,
was I wearing, made for me from two different sorts of linen (?).
I stood with an orarium wrapped around my neck
and round my legs I wore breeches rising on high.
For I also wore a glittering girdle, so that
I appeared standing at the gate [...]

— The Vision of Dorotheus, 329−335; translated by Kessels & Van Der Horst (1987)

The date of the poem's composition has been the subject of much academic discussion, with scholars dating it to several periods around the 4th-century, employing various pieces of textual evidence within their analyses. Hurst, Reverdin & Rudhardt (1984) suggest a date of late-3rd or early-4th-century, based on their aforementioned identification of Dorotheus as the son of Quintus Smyrnaeus, alongside Eusebius' two mentions of "Dorotheus" in that period. van Berchem (1986b) puts the date later, in the early to mid-4th-century, comparing Dorotheus' military uniform (329–334) with those of the soldiers at Arch of Galerius and Rotunda in that period. Livrea (1986) suggests a more specific date of 342–62 CE, based on an 8th-century story of a Bishop of Tyre, Dorotheus, who was martyred under the Roman Emperor Julian (r. 361–363) at the age of 107. Bremmer (1988) has utilised the various realia of the poem, in the abundant mentions of Roman imperial positions, to date the poem to the second half of the 4th century.

Kessels & Van Der Horst (1987) first proposed The Vision of Dorotheus as "the earliest known specimen of Christian hexametric poetry", claiming that it predated Nonnus of Panopolis's The Paraphrase of John (5th-century), the Homeric Centos of Aelia Eudocia (401–460) and pseudo-Apollinaris's Paraphrase of the Psalms (5th-century)—each of which were candidates for this title. This identification has been criticised by Usher (2001) who puts forth the Christian Sibylline Oracles (dated to before 303) and by Simelidis (2009) who proposes Gregory of Nazianzus's (329–390) large corpus of poetry. Both of these predate the proposed date of Bremmer (1988), which both Usher and Simelidis accept over the earlier date of Hurst, Reverdin & Rudhardt (1984).

== Papyrus ==
The Vision of Dorotheus (P. Bodmer 29) is contained on folios 14r-18v (9 pages) of a 22 folio single-quire papyrus codex, known as the Codex of Visions, containing several other Greek texts. In the Codex, the Vision follows The Shepherd of Hermas (P. Bodmer 38) and is followed by several minor Greek Christian poems (P. Bodmer 30-37). This Codex was first sent out for by Swiss Egyptologist Martin Bodmer from the Cypriot antiques dealer Phokion J. Tanos in July 1956, arriving on 1 September to be housed at the Bodmer Library. The Codex is part of the Bodmer Papyri, a collection of papyri that subsumes several early manuscripts of Greek and Coptic texts, including classical works of Menander, Isocrates and Homer, Biblical manuscripts of the apocrypha and the Old and New Testament, and early Christian poems and hagiographies, among others. The editio princeps of P. Bodmer 29 (Hurst, Reverdin & Rudhardt 1984) was published in 1984, in monograph format, resuming the publication of the Bodmer Papyri after an 8-year hiatus.

The papyrus of the Vision has been alternatively dated to the beginning of the 5th century by Hurst, Reverdin & Rudhardt (1984), and to the second half of the 4th century by Cavallo, van Haelst & Kasser (1991). The papyrus is fragmentary and includes many lacunae; only 22 lines remain without damage and several portions of the text are entirely lost. Robinson (2011) has argued this collection was originally part of an early monastery library in Pbow, Chenoboskion, based on the appearance of several letters of abbots of the Pachomian monastery located there.

== Contents ==
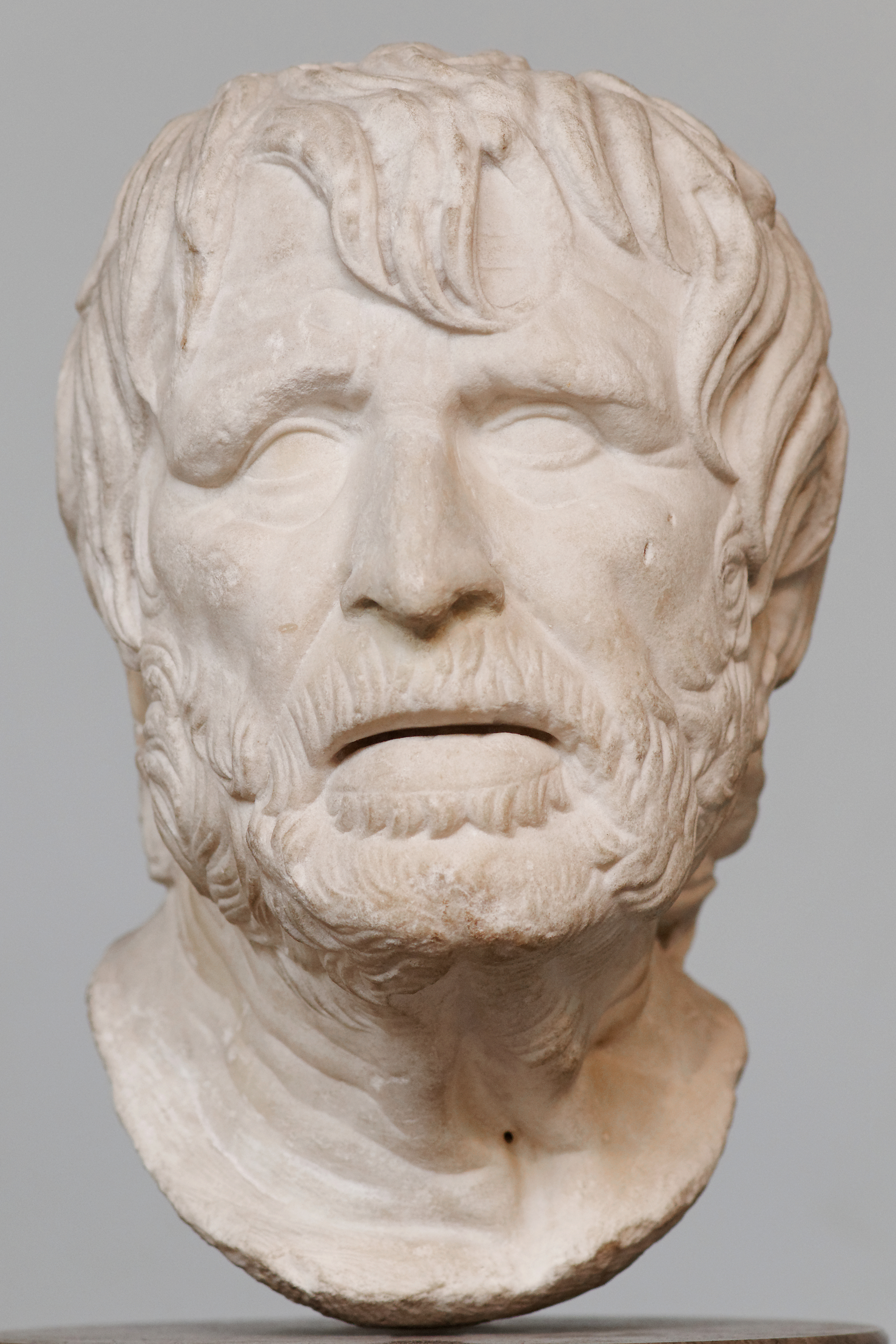
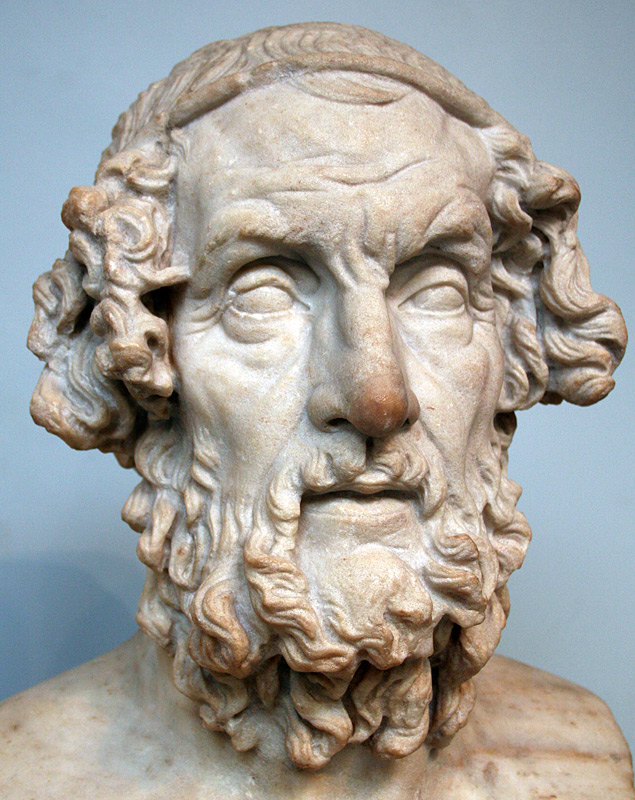
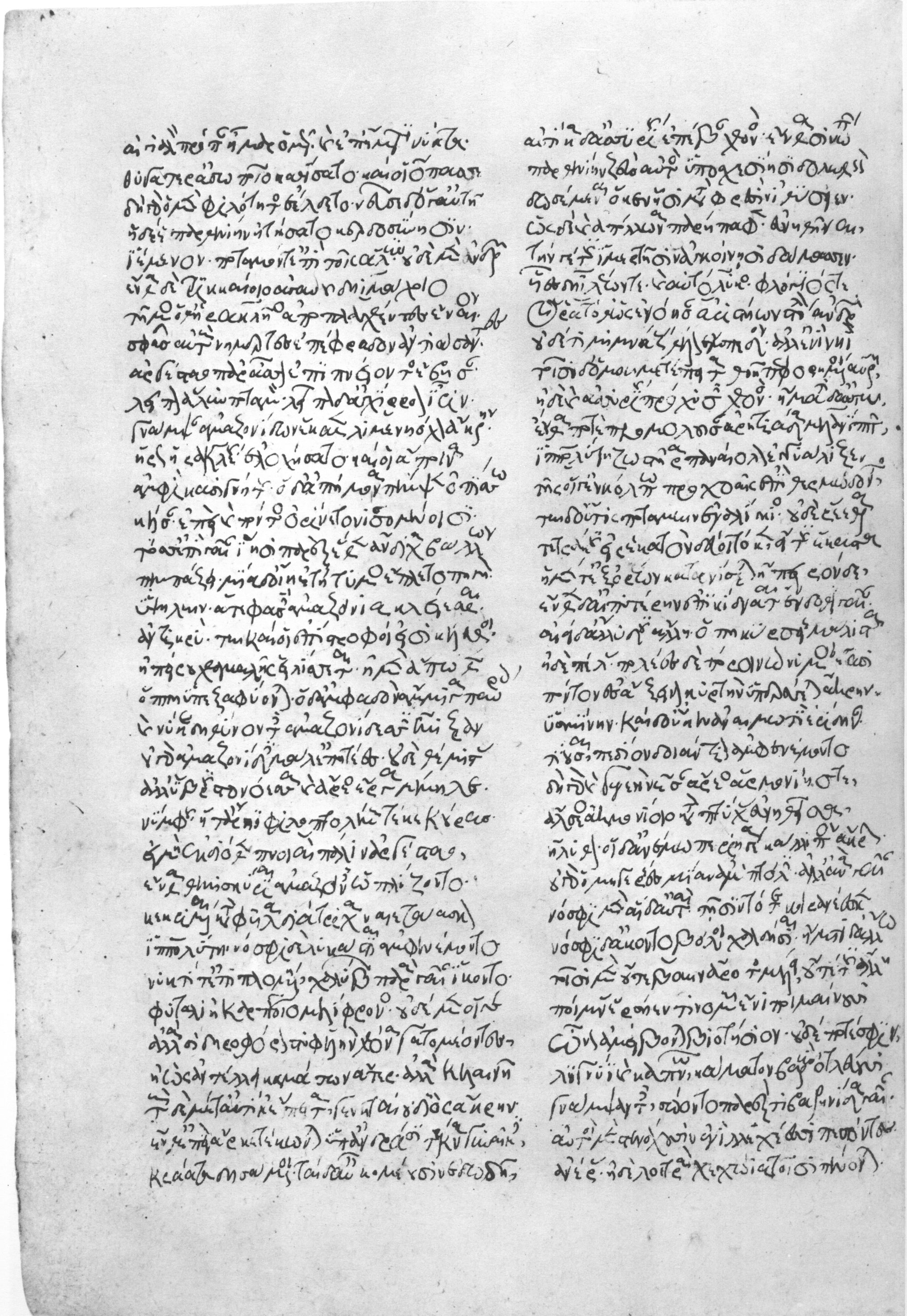
The Greek authors Hesiod (left), Homer (centre), and Apollonius of Rhodes (especially his Argonautica, pictured right) are quoted from and stylistically echoed in The Vision of Dorotheus. At the time, these three authors were the most widely taught in Hellenic schools.

The poem is written in 343 lines of dactylic hexameter, a poetic scheme often found in epic poetry of the period. It is written in Homeric Greek, with Christian or vernacular parts in later dialects of Koine Greek and incorporating many Latin loanwords. Many expressions in the poem are conspicuously borrowed from Homer's own usage in the Illiad and Odyssey, alongside quotations from Hesiod and Apollonius of Rhodes' Argonautica. The poetry includes many metric errors (with elongations and depressions in the poem, where the poet incorrectly identified vowel lengths). These errors have led Vian (1985) to suggest the work "denotes an amateur who had not received a solid academic training" and James & Lee (2000) to summarize it as "the work of someone with considerable knowledge of Greek epic, but very defective mastery of its practice". The poem contains many interesting or obscure Greek terms, often philosophical in origin, which Bremmer (2002) has called "typical of this culture which likes to show off its erudition". Despite the papyrus' significant damage, it remains possible to follow the poem's narrative for most of the text.

The poem begins, describing Dorotheus sitting in an imperial palace, whereupon he is taken by a mystical vision. He sees himself in the Kingdom of Heaven, with the court of Christ presented with praepositi and domestici, in Roman fashion (1–18). What follows is hard to interpret, for the papyrus' damage, but the scene involved Christ, Gabriel and other angels (19–39).

Soon after, Dorotheus is changed "in form and in stature" and employed by the Heavenly praepositi as a tiro, guarding the palace gates (40–46). This office and transformation makes Dorotheus proud and over-confident. He proceeds to disobey his command to stay at the gate and comes across a strange scene in the palace (again hard to interpret, for the papyrus). He addresses Christ and uses "crooked words" to falsely accuse an old man, an action he later regrets, while asking Christ to relieve him of the vision (47–105). Christ sees through this accusation, and interrogates Dorotheus as to why he left his station. He tries feebly to defend himself, but Christ again sees through this and orders a primicerius to throw Dorotheus into the signa (a Roman military prison) and have him flagellated (106–142).

Christ, angry at this betrayal, follows Dorotheus as he is imprisoned in a cave and flagellated by a group of angels, led by Gabriel. Dorotheus endures this punishment and is pardoned by Christ, who again posts him at the gate. This gives him the inspiration for a song, for which he thanks Christ (143–177). God expresses doubts about Dorotheus' reputability, but Gabriel and Christ come to his defense (178–197). Dorotheus, covered in blood from the flagellation, is ordered by God to baptise himself (198–221). He chooses a baptismal name of Andreas (Note: Kessels & Van Der Horst (1987) have considered this choice of name as symbolic of the "recurring theme" of Dorotheus' "lack of courage", being that the name Andreas has etymological associations with Greek andros (ἀνδρός) meaning "masculine".) and is transformed into a taller and stronger man (222–242). Christ orders him to be humble for his new power, and to resume his position. The prestige his body affords him again makes him proud, and he approaches God to be made into a soldier, leaving his less prestigious post. The following response is hard to interpret, but Dorotheus is refused and made to remain as gatekeeper, though his uniform is changed into a that of a cloak, orarium, girdle and breeches (243–335). Dorotheus awakens in the palace and decides to record these events in a song, becoming a "messenger in the service of God Most High" (336–343).

== Interpretation ==
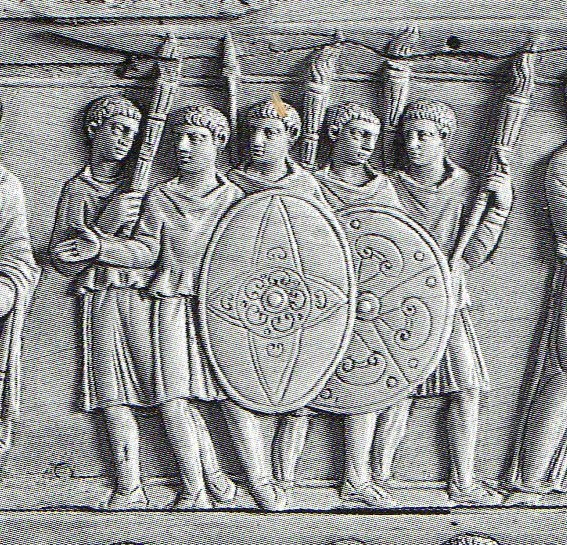
The Scholae Palatinae as depicted on the Brescia Casket, a late 4th-century Christian carved ivory box. Bremmer reads lines 326–334 of the Vision as the poet dressing himself in the garb of the military Scholae, whereas Livrea favours of a more esoteric, Gnostic interpretation.

In interpreting The Vision of Dorotheus, some authors have argued for a Gnostic influence on Dorotheus' writing. Livrea (1986) has suggested that the change in clothes that Dorotheus undergoes at the end of the Vision (326–334) forms an allegory "deeply imbued with Gnosticism", drawing parallels with the Hymn of the Pearl where the King's change of clothes symbolises his immortality. MacCoull (1989) notes the use of two obscure epithets for God, "πανάτιkτος" (translit. panatiktos, meaning wholly unbegotten) (11) and "αὐτοφυής" (translit. autophyês, meaning self-becoming) (12), which he links to a contemporaneous usage in the Nag Hammadi library; "autophyês" being found in The Sophia of Jesus Christ and Epistle of Eugnostos, while the term "αὐτογεvvητός" (translit. autogennêtos, meaning self begotten), which is analogous to "panatiktos", is found in the Epistle of Eugnostos and Ogdoad and Ennead. Additionally, he touches upon the fact that the papyrus of the Vision was found near the site of the Nag Hammadi library, to suggest Dorotheus' possible acquaintance with the local Gnostic groups. This conjectured influence has been criticised by Bremmer (2002), arguing for much more banal Christian origins for the Vision's epithets (noting their occurrence in an earlier Christian Greek inscription of an oracle of Klaros, SEG 27.933) and the clothing as merely an attempt to realistically mimic that of the soldiers of the Scholae Palatinae (specifically the candidati).
