= Pythia (disambiguation) =

The Pythia is an ancient Greek priestess at the Oracle of Apollo at Delphi.

Pythia may also refer to:

- Pythia (drag queen)

== In science ==
- 432 Pythia, a main belt asteroid named after the Greek priestess
- PYTHIA, a particle physics event generator
- Pythia (gastropod), a genus of gastropods in the family Ellobiidae
- Pythia (machine learning), an ancient text restoration deep neural network model.

== In fiction ==
- Pythia (Battlestar Galactica), a fictional character from the new Battlestar Galactica
- Pythia of Gallifrey, a fictional character from the British TV series Doctor Who

== In music ==
- Pythia (band), a British symphonic metal band

== See also ==
- Pythia Island, Antarctica
