= Joyce Reynolds (classicist) =

British classicist (1918–2022)

Joyce Reynolds FBA FSA
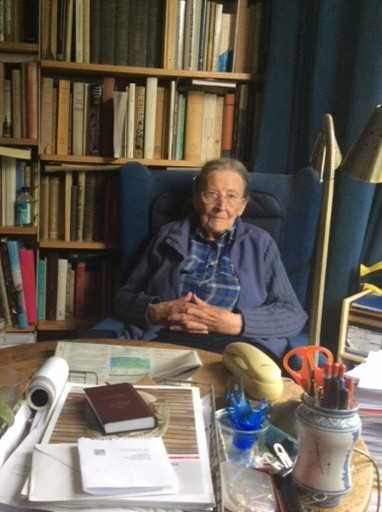
- Reynolds in 2016
- Born: Joyce Maire Reynolds; 18 December 1918; Highams Park, Essex, England
- Died: 11 September 2022 (aged 103); Cambridge, England
- Awards: Fellow of the British Academy, 1982

Academic background
- Education: Somerville College, University of Oxford

Academic work
- Discipline: Classics
- Sub-discipline: Epigraphy; Ancient Rome
- Institutions: Newnham College, University of Cambridge
- Notable students: Charlotte Roueché, Mary Beard, Pat Easterling, M. M. McCabe, Brent Shaw, Dorothy J. Thompson
- Notable works: Christian monuments of Cyrenaica, The Inscriptions of Roman Tripolitania, Aphrodisias and Rome.

Joyce Maire Reynolds FBA FSA (18 December 1918 – 11 September 2022) was a British classicist and academic, specialising in Roman historical epigraphy. She was an honorary fellow of Newnham College, Cambridge. She dedicated her life to the study and teaching of Classics and was the first woman to be awarded the Kenyon medal by the British Academy. Among Reynolds' most significant publications were texts from the city of Aphrodisias, including letters between Aphrodisian and Roman authorities.

== Early life and education ==
Joyce Maire Reynolds was born in Highams Park, Essex on 18 December 1918. Both her parents came from Walthamstow. Her father, William Howe Reynolds, was a civil servant and her mother, Nellie Farmer, a school teacher. Her mother taught her to read and write. Joyce was educated at Walthamstow County Girls' School, and then St Paul's Girls School, where she won a scholarship. Her parents were anti-war, and banned Joyce from reading what they considered to be pro-war writers such as Rudyard Kipling. Joyce did not excel at nor enjoy 'games' (Physical Education) at school.

She studied Greats at Somerville College, Oxford, having been awarded an exhibition between 1937 and 1941. She graduated with a first-class degree in 1944. During the war, from 1941 to 1946, Joyce worked as a temporary civil servant, first as an Assistant Principal at the Board of Trade, later Principal.

== Career ==
From 1951 to 1979, Reynolds was Director of Studies in Classics at Newnham College, Cambridge, and from 1957 to 1983 she was lecturer in Classics at the University of Cambridge. From 1983 to 1984 she was a Reader in Roman Historical Epigraphy at the University of Cambridge and she remained an honorary fellow of Newnham College. In 1982 she was elected to the Fellowship of the British Academy.

Reynolds worked at Tripolitania, and then Cyrenaica, together with Richard Goodchild under the direction of John Bryan Ward-Perkins at the British School at Rome from 1951 onwards.

Reynolds' students included Mary Beard, Pat Easterling, MM McCabe, Charlotte Roueché and Dorothy Thompson.

In her nineties, Reynolds continued to work, playing a prominent role in the online publication of Inscriptions of Aphrodisias (available online), Roman Tripolitania and Cyrenaica. Although Reynolds no longer taught, she did not fully retire, and continued to produce academic research.

== Death ==
Reynolds died at her home in Cambridge, on 11 September 2022, aged 103. Her students Charlotte Roueché and Dorothy Thompson remembered her as a "scrupulous" and painstaking teacher and researcher, "keen to bring the fascination of inscriptions to wider attention" and "well-known in Libya, where she travelled for many decades, as a constant source of help, guidance, and encouragement for all those concerned to understand and to protect the antiquities".

== Honours ==
Reynolds was one of six British women born in 1918 or before featured in The Century Girls, a book written by Tessa Dunlop to commemorate the 100th anniversary of women getting the vote in the United Kingdom, which occurred in 1918. Dunlop describes the life and career of Reynolds in detail, with quotations from interviews with her, and notes "her expansive intellectual capacity and the excitement she derived from academic discovery".

In 2004, Reynolds was awarded the Gold Medal of the Society of Antiquaries for distinguished services to archaeology.

In 2017, Reynolds was awarded the Kenyon Medal by the British Academy "in recognition of a lifetime's contribution to the research and study of Roman epigraphy". She was the first woman awarded this medal.

Reynolds received a Fellowship of Newnham College, Cambridge, in 1951. She was the oldest person to be awarded the honorary degree of Doctor of Letters (D.Litt.) from the University of Cambridge, on 20 June 2018. She was also an honorary Fellow of Somerville College. The Joyce Reynolds Award, a scholarship providing £10,000 towards the living costs of two Cambridge University classics undergraduates from under-represented backgrounds, was named after her. It was set up by Mary Beard, who was tutored by Reynolds.

== Selected publications ==
- Inscriptions of Roman Tripolitania 2021 edition, by J. M. Reynolds, C. M. Roueché, Gabriel Bodard and Caroline Barron (2021), ISBN 978-1-912466-25-2, available here
- Inscriptions of Roman Cyrenaica, by J. M. Reynolds, C. M. Roueché, Gabriel Bodard (2020), ISBN 978-1-912466-22-1, available here
- Inscriptions of Roman Tripolitania, by J. M. Reynolds and J. B. Ward-Perkins, enhanced electronic reissue by Gabriel Bodard and Charlotte Roueché, with new translations by Joyce Reynolds and digital maps (2009). ISBN 978-1-897747-23-0. Available here
- Joyce Reynolds, Charlotte Roueché, Gabriel Bodard, Inscriptions of Aphrodisias (2007), ISBN 978-1-897747-19-3, available here
- editor of: Ward-Perkins, J. B.; Goodchild, R. G. (2003). Christian monuments of Cyrenaica. London: Society for Libyan Studies, ISBN 1-900971-01-1.
- McKenzie, Mary M.; Reynolds, Joyce (1989). Images of authority: papers presented to Joyce Reynolds on the occasion of her seventieth birthday. Cambridge Philological Society.; Supplementary volume. Cambridge. ISBN 9780906014158.
- with Robert Tannenbaum (1987). Jews and God-fearers at Aphrodisias: Greek inscriptions with commentary. Proceedings of the Cambridge Philological Society, Supplementary Volume 12. Cambridge: Cambridge Philological Society, ISBN 0-906014-08-5.
- Reynolds, Joyce. M (1982). Aphrodisias and Rome: documents from the excavation of the theatre at Aphrodisias conducted by Kenan T. Erim: together with some related texts. London: Society for the Promotion of Roman Studies.
- Reynolds, Joyce Maire; Ward-Perkins, J.B. (1952). The inscriptions of Roman Tripolitania. Rome, Published for the British School at Rome. OCLC 7588536.
