= Preaching of Paul =

Religious text

The Preaching of Paul (Latin: Praedicatio Pauli) is a text that is referred to in the book De Rebaptisme or De Baptismo Haereticorum ("On the Baptism of Heretics", dated to the third century). The latter has been falsely attributed to Cyprian of Carthage, and therefore the author of De Rebaptisme is called 'Pseudo-Cyprian'.

== Contents ==
According to Pseudo-Cyprian, the Preaching of Paul is a "heretical forgery", which, amongst other things, claims that Jesus had once confessed his sins. The Baptism of Jesus would have been performed in order to cleanse him of sin. These claims went against the proto-orthodox teaching that Jesus (and his mother Mary) had always been free of sins. Moreover, several events that do not fit with Pseudo-Cyprian's understanding of history are recorded in the Preaching of Paul, such as Paul and Peter meeting each other for the first time in Rome, even though they must have met each other before at the Council of Jerusalem. Therefore, Pseudo-Cyprian argued, the writing should be excluded from the Bible. Thus, it is counted amongst the New Testament apocrypha.

== Scholarship ==
The original text of the Preaching of Paul has not survived, so its contents are unknown. English theologian Joseph Lightfoot (1828–1889) noted that Pseudo-Cyprian tried to invalidate the Praedicatio Pauli by "show[ing] its thoroughly unhistorical character; and among other instances he alleges the fact that it makes St Peter and St Paul meet in Rome as if for the first time, forgetting all about the congress at Jerusalem, the collision at Antioch, and so forth." German New Testament scholar Wilhelm Schneemelcher (1914–2003) concluded that the writing probably did exist and was written between 150 and 250 CE, but should not be confused with the Kerygmata of Peter nor with the Acts of Paul.
