= List of Bodmer Papyri =

The Bodmer Papyri are a set of Greek and Coptic manuscripts, ranging from the 2nd to the 7th-centuries. These manuscripts were collected between the 1950s and 1960s by Swiss bibliophile, Martin Bodmer, who obtained them across Egypt. Many of these manuscripts are unique or early attestations of important Christian works, such as The Vision of Dorotheus or the Biblical 𝔓^{75}, described by the Bodmer Foundation (French: Fondation Bodmer) as "highly important for the history of early Christianity", alongside several classical or Egyptological works, such as the works of Menander and Egyptian land and financial registers. Many of these papyri are parts of larger papyrus codexes, such as the Bodmer Composite Codex or Codex of Visions. These manuscripts, since Bodmer's death, have been scattered across several collections; primarily in the Bibliotheca Bodmeriana, these papyri are also found in the Chester Beatty Library, libraries in Mississippi, Cologne, Barcelona and the Vatican. Because of the efforts of the Fondation and many scholars, these manuscripts have been prepared into editiones principes and digitized, allowing for scholarly access.

The following list is based on the catalogues of the Bodmer Lab, Brent Nongbri and Albert Pietersma. The numbering system is based on the abbreviation "Papyrus Bodmer" with an Arabic numeral (e.g. Papyrus Bodmer 23). Where a date range for a papyrus can be ascertained, it is included. The "citation(s)" section refers to the editio princeps of the papyrus, alongside later text revisions or additions. When a papyrus is part of a larger codex, that codex's name is added.

== Manuscripts ==
Number	Date	Content	Citation(s)	Codex
Papyrus Bodmer 1 (I)	3rd/4th-century	Egyptian land list, later turned over and reused to record books 5 & 6 of the Illiad	Martin, Victor, ed. (1954). Papyrus Bodmer I. Iliade, chants 5 et 6. Cologny-Genève: Bibliotheca Bodmeriana. OCLC 14957800. Derda, Tomasz, ed. (2010). P. Bodmer I Recto: A Land List from the Panopolite Nome in Upper Egypt (after AD 216/7). Journal of Juristic Papyrology Supplements. Vol. 14. Warsaw: Journal of Juristic Papyrology. ISBN 978-83-925919-3-1. OCLC 1081173898.	–
Papyrus Bodmer 2 (II)	2nd/3rd-century	John 1:1-21:9, in Greek. Known as 𝔓^{66} in Gregory-Aland numbering	Martin, Victor, ed. (1956). Papyrus Bodmer II: Évangile de Jean, chap. 1-14. Cologny-Genève: Bibliotheca Bodmeriana. OCLC 912212028. Martin, Victor, ed. (1958). Papyrus Bodmer II, Supplément: Évangile de Jean, chap. 14-21. Cologny-Genève: Bibliotheca Bodmeriana. Martin, Victor; Barns, J.W.B., eds. (1962). Papyrus Bodmer II, Supplément: Évangile de Jean, chap. 14-21. Cologny-Genève: Bibliotheca Bodmeriana. OCLC 179911470. Zumstein, Jean, ed. (2008). L'Évangile selon Jean: Introduction et traduction. Paris: Presses Universitaires de France. OCLC 1027233630.	–
Papyrus Bodmer 3 (III)	4th-century	John 1:1-21:25 and Genesis 1:1-4:2, in proto-Bohairic Coptic	Kasser, Rodolphe, ed. (1958). Papyrus Bodmer III. Évangile de Jean et Genèse I-IV, 2, en bohaïrique, 2 vols. Louvain: Corpus Scriptorum Christianorum Orientalium. OCLC 1142638. Kasser, Rodolphe, ed. (2001). "Le Papyrus Bodmer III réexaminé: Amélioration de sa transcription". Journal of Coptic Studies. 3: 81–112. doi:10.2143/JCS.3.0.503608. Sharp, Daniel B., ed. (2016). Papyrus Bodmer III: An Early Coptic Version of the Gospel of John and Genesis. Berlin: de Gruyter. ISBN 978-3-11-043630-3. OCLC 962359610.	–
Papyrus Bodmer 4 (IV)	3rd-century	The Dyskolos of Menander in Greek, best preserved text of Menander in the Codex	Martin, Victor, ed. (1958). Papyrus Bodmer IV. Ménandre: Le Dyscolos. Cologny-Genève: Bibliotheca Bodmeriana. OCLC 884604925.	The Bodmer Menander Codex
Papyrus Bodmer 5 (V)	3rd/4th-century	Text of the apocryphal Protevangelium of James (also known as the Genesis Marias or Infancy Gospel of James)	Testuz, Michel, ed. (1958). Papyrus Bodmer V: Nativité de Marie. Cologny-Genève: Bibliotheca Bodmeriana. OCLC 9121571.	The Bodmer Composite Codex
Papyrus Bodmer 6 (VI)	4th/5th-century	Proverbs 1:1-21:4, in proto-Theban Coptic	Kasser, Rodolphe, ed. (1960). Papyrus Bodmer VI: Livre des proverbes. Louvain: Corpus Scriptorum Christianorum Orientalium. OCLC 615506300.	–
Papyrus Bodmer 7 (VII)	3rd/4th-century	Epistle of Jude 1-25, in Greek. Known as 𝔓^{72} in Gregory-Aland numbering.	Testuz, Michel, ed. (1959). Papyrus Bodmer VII-IX. VII: L'Épître de Jude. VIII: Les deux épîtres de Pierre. IX: Les Psaumes 33 et 34. Cologny-Genève: Bibliotheca Bodmeriana. OCLC 42142745.	The Bodmer Composite Codex
Papyrus Bodmer 8 (VIII)	3rd/4th-century	First and Second Epistle of Peter in Greek. Known as 𝔓^{72} in Gregory-Aland numbering	Testuz, Michel, ed. (1959). Papyrus Bodmer VII-IX. VII: L'Épître de Jude. VIII: Les deux épîtres de Pierre. IX: Les Psaumes 33 et 34. Cologny-Genève: Bibliotheca Bodmeriana. OCLC 42142745.	The Bodmer Composite Codex
Papyrus Bodmer 9 (IX)	3rd/4th-century	Psalms 33-34, in Greek. Known as Rahlfs 2113 in Rahlfs classification.	Testuz, Michel, ed. (1959). Papyrus Bodmer VII-IX. VII: L'Épître de Jude. VIII: Les deux épîtres de Pierre. IX: Les Psaumes 33 et 34. Cologny-Genève: Bibliotheca Bodmeriana. OCLC 42142745.	The Apology of Phileas and Psalms Codex
Papyrus Bodmer 10 (X)	3rd/4th-century	Apocryphal correspondence of Paul the Apostle and the Corinthians, the Third Epistle to the Corinthians, in Greek	Testuz, Michel, ed. (1959). Papyrus Bodmer X-XII. X: Correspondance apocryphe des Corinthiens et de l'apôtre Paul. XI: Onzième Ode de Salomon. XII: Fragment d'un Hymne liturgique. Cologny-Genève: Bibliotheca Bodmeriana. OCLC 42142745.	The Bodmer Composite Codex
Papyrus Bodmer 11 (XI)	3rd/4th-century	11th Ode of Solomon, in Greek	Testuz, Michel, ed. (1959). Papyrus Bodmer X-XII. X: Correspondance apocryphe des Corinthiens et de l'apôtre Paul. XI: Onzième Ode de Salomon. XII: Fragment d'un Hymne liturgique. Cologny-Genève: Bibliotheca Bodmeriana. OCLC 42142745.	The Bodmer Composite Codex
Papyrus Bodmer 12 (XII)	3rd/4th-century	Unidentified fragment of a liturgical hymn in Greek, only extant in 6 lines.	Testuz, Michel, ed. (1959). Papyrus Bodmer X-XII. X: Correspondance apocryphe des Corinthiens et de l'apôtre Paul. XI: Onzième Ode de Salomon. XII: Fragment d'un Hymne liturgique. Cologny-Genève: Bibliotheca Bodmeriana. OCLC 42142745.	The Bodmer Composite Codex
Papyrus Bodmer 13 (XIII)	3rd/4th-century	Peri Pascha by Melito of Sardis, in Greek.	Testuz, Michel, ed. (1960). Papyrus Bodmer XIII. Méliton de Sardes, Homélie sur la Pâque. Cologny-Genève: Bibliotheca Bodmeriana. OCLC 460430133. Nongbri, Brent; Hall, Stuart G., eds. (2017). "Melito's Peri Pascha 1–5 as Recovered from a 'Lost' Leaf of Papyrus Bodmer XIII". Journal of Theological Studies. 68 (2): 576–592. doi:10.1093/jts/flx156.	The Bodmer Composite Codex
Papyrus Bodmer 14 (XIV)	2nd to 4th-century	Luke 3:18-18:18; 22:4-24:53. Earliest manuscript copy of the Lord's Prayer. Known as 𝔓^{75} in Gregory-Aland numbering	Martin, Victor; Kasser, Rodolphe, eds. (1961). Papyrus Bodmer XIV: Évangile de Luc, chap. 3-24. Cologny-Genève: Bibliotheca Bodmeriana. OCLC 34973148.	The XIV+XV Codex
Papyrus Bodmer 15 (XV)	2nd to 4th-century	John 1:1-15:8. Known as 𝔓^{75} in Gregory-Aland numbering	Martin, Victor; Kasser, Rodolphe, eds. (1961). Papyrus Bodmer XV: Évangile de Jean, chap. 1-15. Cologny-Genève: Bibliotheca Bodmeriana. OCLC 1113189131.	The XIV+XV Codex
Papyrus Bodmer 16 (XVI)	4th-century	Exodus 1:1-15:21, in Sahidic Coptic. The papyrus is preserved in its leather binding.	Rodolphe, Kasser, ed. (1961). Papyrus Bodmer XVI: Exode I-XV, 21, en sahidique. Cologny-Genève: Bibliotheca Bodmeriana. OCLC 602231562.	–
Papyrus Bodmer 17 (XVII)	7th-century	Acts 1:2-28:31; James 1:1-5:20: 1 Peter 1:1-3:5; 2 Peter 2:21-3:16; 1 John 1:1-5:17; 2 John 1-13; 3 John 6, 12; Jude 3-25; in Greek. Known as 𝔓^{74} in Gregory-Aland numbering	Kasser, Rodolphe, ed. (1961). Papyrus Bodmer XVII: Actes des Apôtres, Épîtres de Jacques, Pierre, Jean et Jude. Cologny-Genève: Bibliotheca Bodmeriana. OCLC 1073915727.	–
Papyrus Bodmer 18 (XVIII)	4th-century	Deuteronomy 1:1-10:7, in Sahidic Coptic	Kasser, Rodolphe, ed. (1962). Papyrus Bodmer XVIII: Deutéronome I-X, 7, en sahidique. Cologny-Genève: Bibliotheca Bodmeriana. OCLC 460673807.	–
Papyrus Bodmer 19 (XIX)	4th/5th-century	Matthew 14:28-28:20; Romans 1:1-2:3; in Sahidic Coptic	Kasser, Rodolphe, ed. (1962). Papyrus Bodmer XIX: Évangile de Matthieu XIV, 28-XXVIII, 20. Épître aux Romains I, -II.3, en sahidique. Cologny-Genève: Bibliotheca Bodmeriana. OCLC 264952219.	–
Papyrus Bodmer 20 (XX)	4th-century	Apology of Phileas, a hagiographical account of the judicial examination of the bishop of Thmuis, Phileas, who was martyred in 306.	Martin, Victor, ed. (1964). Papyrus Bodmer XX: Apologie de Philéas, évêque de Thmouis. Cologny-Geneva: Bibliotheque Bodmeriana. OCLC 883884103.	The Apology of Phileas and Psalms Codex
Papyrus Bodmer 21 (XXI)	4th-century	Joshua 6:16-25, 7:6-11:23, 22:1-2, 22:19-23:7, 23:15-24:2; in Sahidic Coptic (a portion of the Codex is in the Chester Beatty Library)	Kasser, Rodolphe (1963). Papyrus Bodmer XXI: Josué. Cologny-Genève: Bibliotheca Bodmeriana. OCLC 1075815309.	–
Papyrus Bodmer 22 (XXII)	4th/5th-century	Jeremiah 40:3-52:34; Lamentations; Epistle of Jeremiah; Baruch 1:1-5:5; in Sahidic Coptic. (The second half of this codex is known as Mississippi Codex II)	Kasser, Rodolphe, ed. (1964). Papyrus Bodmer XXII et Mississipi Coptic Codex II. Jérémie XL, 3-LII, 34, Lamentations. Épître de Jérémie, Baruch I, 1-V, 5, en sahidique. Cologny-Genève: Bibliotheca Bodmeriana. OCLC 1091922165.	–
Papyrus Bodmer 23 (XXIII)	4th-century	Isaiah 47:1-66:24, in Sahidic Coptic	Kasser, Rodolphe, ed. (1965). Papyrus Bodmer XXIII: Ésaïe XLVII, 1-LXVI 24, en sahidique. Cologny-Genève: Bibliotheca Bodmeriana. OCLC 369135693.	–
Papyrus Bodmer 24 (XXIV)	3rd/4th-century	Psalms 17:46-117:44, in Greek. Known as Rahlfs 2110 in Rahlfs classification	Kasser, Rodolphe; Testuz, Michel, eds. (1967). Papyrus Bodmer XXIV: Psaumes XVII-CXVIII (grec). Cologny-Genève: Bibliotheca Bodmeriana. OCLC 557664971.	–
Papyrus Bodmer 25 (XXV)	3rd-century	The Samia of Menander, in Greek.	Kasser, Rodolphe; Austin, Colin, eds. (1969). Papyrus Bodmer XXV. Ménandre: La Samienne. Cologny-Genève: Bibliotheca Bodmeriana. OCLC 492649782.	The Bodmer Menander Codex
Papyrus Bodmer 26 (XXVI)	3rd-century	The Aspis of Menander, in Greek.	Kasser, Rodolphe; Austin, Colin, eds. (1969). Papyrus Bodmer XXVI. Ménandre: Le Bouclier. En appendice: compléments au Papyrus Bodmer IV, Ménandre: Le Dyscolos. Cologny-Genève: Bibliotheca Bodmeriana. OCLC 649208.	The Bodmer Menander Codex
Papyrus Bodmer 27 (XXVII)	4th-century	Book 6 of Thucydides' History of the Peloponnesian War, in Greek.	Carlini, Antonio (1975). Carlini, Antonio (ed.). "II papiro di Tucidide della Bibliotheca Bodmeriana (P. Bodmer XXVII)". Museum Helveticum. 32 (1): 33–40. doi:10.5169/seals-25755. JSTOR 24814727.	The Bodmer Daniel-Thucydides Codex
Papyrus Bodmer 28 (XXVIII)	2nd-century	Fragmentary papyrus roll containing a satyr play with a conversation between Heracles and Atlas	Turner, Eric G. (1976). Turner, Eric G. (ed.). "Papyrus Bodmer XXVIII: A Satyr-Play on the Confrontation of Heracles and Atlas". Museum Helveticum. 33 (1): 1–23. doi:10.5169/seals-26396. JSTOR 24814932.	–
Papyrus Bodmer 29 (XXIX)	4th/5th-century	An early Christian epic poem, The Vision of Dorotheus, composed sometime in the 4th-century. Earliest example of dactylic hexameter in Christian poetry and entirely unique to the Bodmer papyri.	Hurst, André; Reverdin, Olivier; Rudhardt, Jean, eds. (1984). Papyrus Bodmer XXIX: Vision de Dorothéos. Cologny-Genève: Foundation Martin Bodmer. OCLC 1100323149. Kessels, A. H. M.; Van Der Horst, P. W. (December 1987). Kessels, A. H. M.; Van Der Horst, P. W. (eds.). "The Vision of Dorotheus (Pap. Bodmer 29): Edited with Introduction, Translation and Notes". Vigiliae Christianae. 41 (4): 313–359. doi:10.2307/1583739. JSTOR 1583739.	The Bodmer Codex of Visions
Papyrus Bodmer 30 (XXX)	4th/5th-centuries	Pros Abraam, a unique and short (30 line) Greek Christian poem retelling the Binding of Isaac.	Hurst, André; Rudhardt, Jean, eds. (1999). Papyri Bodmer XXX-XXXVII. "Codex des Visions", Poèmes divers. München: K. G. Saur. ISBN 978-3-598-22554-3. OCLC 955576831.	The Bodmer Codex of Visions
Papyrus Bodmer 31 (XXXI)	4th/5th-centuries	A Christian poem, "on the Just", in Greek.	Hurst, André; Rudhardt, Jean, eds. (1999). Papyri Bodmer XXX-XXXVII. "Codex des Visions", Poèmes divers. München: K. G. Saur. ISBN 978-3-598-22554-3. OCLC 955576831.	The Bodmer Codex of Visions
Papyrus Bodmer 32 (XXXII)	4th/5th-centuries	A Christian poem, "[...] of the Lord Jesus", in Greek.	Hurst, André; Rudhardt, Jean, eds. (1999). Papyri Bodmer XXX-XXXVII. "Codex des Visions", Poèmes divers. München: K. G. Saur. ISBN 978-3-598-22554-3. OCLC 955576831.	The Bodmer Codex of Visions
Papyrus Bodmer 33 (XXXIII)	4th/5th-centuries	A Christian poem, "What Would Say Cain Having Murdered [Abel]", in Greek. Part 1 of the "Murder of Abel by Cain".	Hurst, André; Rudhardt, Jean, eds. (1999). Papyri Bodmer XXX-XXXVII. "Codex des Visions", Poèmes divers. München: K. G. Saur. ISBN 978-3-598-22554-3. OCLC 955576831.	The Bodmer Codex of Visions
Papyrus Bodmer 34 (XXXIV)	4th/5th-centuries	A Christian poem, "The Lord to the [...]", in Greek.	Hurst, André; Rudhardt, Jean, eds. (1999). Papyri Bodmer XXX-XXXVII. "Codex des Visions", Poèmes divers. München: K. G. Saur. ISBN 978-3-598-22554-3. OCLC 955576831.	The Bodmer Codex of Visions
Papyrus Bodmer 35 (XXXV)	4th/5th-centuries	A Christian poem, "“[...] Abel Destroyed by Cain", in Greek. Part 2 of the "Murder of Abel by Cain".	Hurst, André; Rudhardt, Jean, eds. (1999). Papyri Bodmer XXX-XXXVII. "Codex des Visions", Poèmes divers. München: K. G. Saur. ISBN 978-3-598-22554-3. OCLC 955576831.	The Bodmer Codex of Visions
Papyrus Bodmer 36 (XXXVI)	4th/5th-centuries	A Christian poem in Greek, whose title has been lost for the codex's damage.	Hurst, André; Rudhardt, Jean, eds. (1999). Papyri Bodmer XXX-XXXVII. "Codex des Visions", Poèmes divers. München: K. G. Saur. ISBN 978-3-598-22554-3. OCLC 955576831.	The Bodmer Codex of Visions
Papyrus Bodmer 37 (XXXVII)	4th/5th-centuries	An unidentified Christian hymn in Greek.	Hurst, André; Rudhardt, Jean, eds. (1999). Papyri Bodmer XXX-XXXVII. "Codex des Visions", Poèmes divers. München: K. G. Saur. ISBN 978-3-598-22554-3. OCLC 955576831.	The Bodmer Codex of Visions
Papyrus Bodmer 38 (XXXVIII)	4th/5th-centuries	The Shepherd of Hermas, visions 1-3, in Greek. A missing 4th vision has been conjectured, but is not extant in the codex.	Carlini, Antonio; Giaccone, Luigi, eds. (1991). Papyrus Bodmer XXXVIII. Erma: Il Pastore (Ia –IIIa visione). Cologny-Genève: Bibliotheca Bodmeriana. ISBN 978-3-598-22554-3. OCLC 955576831.	The Bodmer Codex of Visions
Papyrus Bodmer 39 (XXXIX)		Letter 11b of Pachomius the Great, in Sahidic Coptic	(publication still in progress) Méla, Charles; Möri, Frédéric, eds. (2014). Alexandrie la divine, volume II. Genève: Éditions de la Baconnière. p. 1093. OCLC 892037157.	–
Papyrus Bodmer 40 (XL)		The Song of Songs, in Sahidic Coptic.	Kasser, Rodolphe; Luisier, Philippe (2012). Kasser, Rodolphe; Luisier, Philippe (eds.). "P. Bodmer XL: "Cantique des Cantiques" en copte saïdique". Orientalia. 81 (3): 149–201. JSTOR 43077429.	–
Papyrus Bodmer 41 (XLI)	4th-century	The Acts of Paul, in Sub-Achmimic Coptic	Kasser, Rodolphe; Luisier, Philippe, eds. (2004). "Le Papyrus Bodmer XLI en Édition Princeps l'Épisode d'Èphèse des Acta Pauli en Copte et en Traduction". Le Muséon. 117 (3–4): 281–384. doi:10.2143/MUS.117.3.516930.	–
Papyrus Bodmer 42 (XLII)	4th to 6th-century	2 Corinthians 10:15-11:12, in Sahidic Coptic.	Sharp, Daniel B. (2018). Sharp, Daniel B. (ed.). "Papyrus Bodmer XLII: 2 Corinthians 10:15-11:12 in Sahidic". Journal of Coptic Studies. 20: 177–188. doi:10.2143/JCS.20.0.3284659.	–
Papyrus Bodmer 43 (XLIII)		Zostrianos, in Sahidic Coptic. Written on a single papyrus leaf.	Kasser and, Rodolphe; Luisier, Philippe, eds. (2007). "Le Papyrus Bodmer XLIII: Un feuillet de Zostrien". Le Muséon. 120: 251–272. doi:10.2143/MUS.120.3.2024676.	–
Papyrus Bodmer 44 (XLIV)		Daniel, in Bohairic Coptic. Written on 73 parchment leaves.	(publication in progress)	–
Papyrus Bodmer 45 (XLV)	4th-century	Susanna, (a possibly apocryphal portion of the Book of Daniel) in Theodotion's Greek translation.	Carlini, Antonio; Citi, Annamaria (1981). Carlini, Antonio; Citi, Annamaria (eds.). "Susanna e la prima visione di Daniele in due papiri inediti della Bibliotheca Bodmeriana: P.Bodm. XLV e P.Bodm. XLVI". Museum Helveticum. 38 (2): 81–120. doi:10.5169/seals-29564. JSTOR 24815688.	The Bodmer Daniel-Thucydides Codex
Papyrus Bodmer 46 (XLVI)	4th-century	Daniel 1:1-20, in Theodotion's Greek translation.	Carlini, Antonio; Citi, Annamaria (1981). Carlini, Antonio; Citi, Annamaria (eds.). "Susanna e la prima visione di Daniele in due papiri inediti della Bibliotheca Bodmeriana: P.Bodm. XLV e P.Bodm. XLVI". Museum Helveticum. 38 (2): 81–120. doi:10.5169/seals-29564. JSTOR 24815688.	The Bodmer Daniel-Thucydides Codex
Papyrus Bodmer 47 (XLVII)	4th-century	A selection of moral maxims arranged acrostically, in Greek.	Carlini, Antonio; Bandini, Michele (1991). Carlini, Antonio; Bandini, Michele (eds.). "P.Bodmer XLVII: un acrostico alfabetico tra Susanna-Daniele e Tucidide". Museum Helveticum. 48 (3): 158–168. doi:10.5169/seals-37702. JSTOR 24817812.	The Bodmer Daniel-Thucydides Codex
Papyrus Bodmer 48 (XLVIII)		Homer's Iliad, 1:45-58; inscribed in Greek on two small papyrus fragments.	Hurst, André (1990). Hurst, André (ed.). "Papyrus Bodmer 48: Iliade 1, 45-58". Museum Helveticum. 47 (1): 30–33. doi:10.5169/seals-36880. JSTOR 24817277.	–
Papyrus Bodmer 49 (XLIX)		Homer's Odyssey 9:455-488 & 526-556; 10:188-215; in Greek	Hurst, André (1986). Hurst, André (ed.). "Papyrus Bodmer 49: Odyssée 9, 455-488 et 526-556; 10, 188-215". Museum Helveticum. 43 (4): 221–230. doi:10.5169/seals-33401. JSTOR 24816511.	–
Papyrus Bodmer 50 (L)		Matthew 25:43, 26:2-3; in Greek. Originally described as part of Papyrus Bodmer 17, where the codex's decaying leaves had stuck together. Known as 𝔓^{73} in Gregory-Aland numbering.	Kasser, Rodolphe, ed. (1961). Papyrus Bodmer XVII: Papyrus Bodmer XVII: Actes des Apôtres: Epîtres de Jacques, Pierre, Jean et Jude. Cologny-Geneva: Bibliotheca Bodmeriana. pp. 9–10. OCLC 1073915727. Thiede, Carsten Peter (1990). Thiede, Carsten Peter (ed.). "Papyrus Bodmer L: Das neutestamentliche Papyrusfragment P73 = Mt 25,43 / 26, 2-3". Museum Helveticum. 47 (1): 35–40. doi:10.5169/seals-36882. JSTOR 24817279.	–
Papyrus Bodmer 51 (LI)		Papyrus fragment used for syllable exercises, and later reused for a medical/ethnographic treatise, both in Greek. The fragments were found in the leather cover of Papyrus Bodmer 23.	Kasser, Rodolphe, ed. (1965). Papyrus Bodmer XXIII: Esaïe XLVII, l – LXVI, 24 en sahidique. Cologny-Genève: Bibliothèque Bodmer. pp. 8–15. OCLC 369135693. Di Bitonto Kasser, Anna (1998). Kasser, Anna Di Bitonto (ed.). "P.Bodmer LI recto: esercizio di divisione sillabica". Museum Helveticum. 55 (2): 112–118. doi:10.5169/seals-43034. JSTOR 24820780. Schubert, Paul (2016). Schubert, Paul (ed.). "P.Bodmer LI verso: restes d'un traité médical ou ethnographique?". Museum Helveticum. 73 (1): 1–10. doi:10.5169/seals-587266. JSTOR 44744190.	–
Papyrus Bodmer 52 (LII)		Greek papyrus leaf of Isocrates' Ad Nicoclem, found in the leather cover of Papyrus Bodmer 23.	Schubert, Paul (1997). Schubert, Paul (ed.). "P.Bodmer LII: Isocrate, A Nicoclès 16-22". Museum Helveticum. 54 (2): 97–105. doi:10.5169/seals-42154. JSTOR 24820992.	–
Papyrus Bodmer 53 (LIII)		Blank papyrus leaf, found in the leather cover of Papyrus Bodmer 23.	(nothing to publish)	–
Papyrus Bodmer 54 (LIV)		Fragmentary land register, found in the leather cover of Papyrus Bodmer 23.	Fournet, Jean-Luc; Gascou, Jean, eds. (2015). "Édition de P.Bodm. LIV-LVI". Adamantius. 21: 34–37.	–
Papyrus Bodmer 55 (LV)		Fragmentary fiscal register, found in the leather cover of Papyrus Bodmer 23.	Fournet, Jean-Luc; Gascou, Jean, eds. (2015). "Édition de P.Bodm. LIV-LVI". Adamantius. 21: 34–37.	–
Papyrus Bodmer 56 (LVI)		Fragmentary fiscal register, found in the leather cover of Papyrus Bodmer 23.	Fournet, Jean-Luc; Gascou, Jean, eds. (2015). "Édition de P.Bodm. LIV-LVI". Adamantius. 21: 34–37.	–
Papyrus Bodmer 57 (LVII)		Part of a codex of Didymus the Blind's Commentary on the Psalms (Codex V of the Tura papyri, a group of Codexes found in Tura during WWII) in Greek. The codex as a whole, is dispersed across several collections. The papyrus was a palimpsest and has a noticeable undertext.	Doutreleau, Louis; Gesché, Adolphe; Gronewald, Michael, eds. (1969). Didymos der Blinde: Psalmenkommentar (Tura Papyrus) Teil I, Kommentar zu Psalm 20-21. Bonn: Habelt. OCLC 311330633. Gronewald, Michael, ed. (1970). Didymos der Blinde: Psalmenkommentar (Tura-Papyrus) Teil V, Kommentar zu Psalm 40-44, 4. Bonn: Habelt. OCLC 41044363.	–
Papyrus Bodmer 58 (LVIII)		Papyrus codex of patristic works in Sahidic Coptic. Bodmer Lab catalogues: "a dialogue between two deacons and Cyril of Alexandria; letter from Theophilus to Horsiesius; a dialogue between Horsiesius and Theophilus; a letter from Theophilus to monks; a dialogue between Phausos and Timotheos with Horsiesius; a collection of works attributed to Agathonicos; and a Coptic recipe for the preparation of parchment". The text was formerly in the collection of Thomas Phillipps, and was published under this name.	Crum, Walter E., ed. (1915). Der Papyruscodex saec. VI-VII der Phillippsbibliothek in Cheltenham (PDF). Straßburg: Karl J. Trübner. OCLC 463132047. Crum, Walter E., ed. (1905). "A Coptic recipe for the preparation of parchment". Proceedings of the Society of Biblical Archaeology. 27: 166–171.	–
