= Inscriptions of Aphrodisias =

Inscriptions of Aphrodisias was a project funded by the Leverhulme Trust and the British Academy that aimed to publish the inscriptions of the Greek ancient site of Aphrodisias (modern day Turkey) online. Apart from aiming for a digital publication of the inscriptions, the experience from this publishing process was intended to be used for further development of the guidelines of the EpiDoc collaborative, on which the publication was based.

== History ==
Initial efforts to form an international team of collaborators were already made in 2002, with a British Academy project led by Charlotte Roueché and Geoffrey B. Waywell. A first major result was the publication of 'Aphrodisias in Late Antiquity' ('ala2004') by Charlotte Roueché in 2004. Leverhulme's grant in 2004 also allowed the establishment of several workshops a year from May the same year. These workshops were held in the United States, the United Kingdom and mainland Europe to allow wide participation and collaboration.

The goal was to create a follow-up publication of a much wider range of inscriptions from Aphrodisias as well as to amend existing standards for the digital publication of epigraphic material and producing new guidelines where necessary. To this end, more than ten workshops were held between 2004 and 2006, and representatives of the project also gave talks on the project in various context during this period. The final first edition of a corpus of all inscriptions from Aphrodisias was published in 2007 by Joyce Reynolds, Charlotte Roueché and Gabriel Bodard

== Project aims ==
Aphrodisias was a small ancient Greek city in modern-day Turkey. It is well known for its rich epigraphic record with about 2000 known inscriptions conditioned by the high-quality marble from the area. This richness invited a publication format different from the conventional, and the choice of online publication using EpiDoc was chosen for the possibility to incorporate diverse archaeological information as well as good accessibility.

Initially intended to create a corpus of the inscriptions of Aphrodisias and to further develop the EpiDoc guidelines, the Inscriptions of Aphrodisias Project also proved to foster the networks and collaboration between scholars in the field. Another result was the plan to develop the EpiDoc guidelines not only as a tool for publication, but also for editing and preparing a publication.

== Links ==
- The Inscriptions of Aphrodisias Project website hosted by [King's College London]
- A list of people and institutions that were in charge of the project
- Charlotte Roueché. "Aphrodisias in Late Antiquity: The Late Roman and Byzantine Inscriptions". ISBN 1-897747-17-9.
- IAph2007, Joyce Reynolds, Charlotte Roueché, Gabriel Bodard, Inscriptions of Aphrodisias (2007), available online, ISBN 978-1-897747-19-3.
- The EpiDoc website with further information and links
- The website of the excavations carried out by New York University
- The location of Aphrodisias on Google Maps
