= Papyrus 72 =

- New Testament manuscript
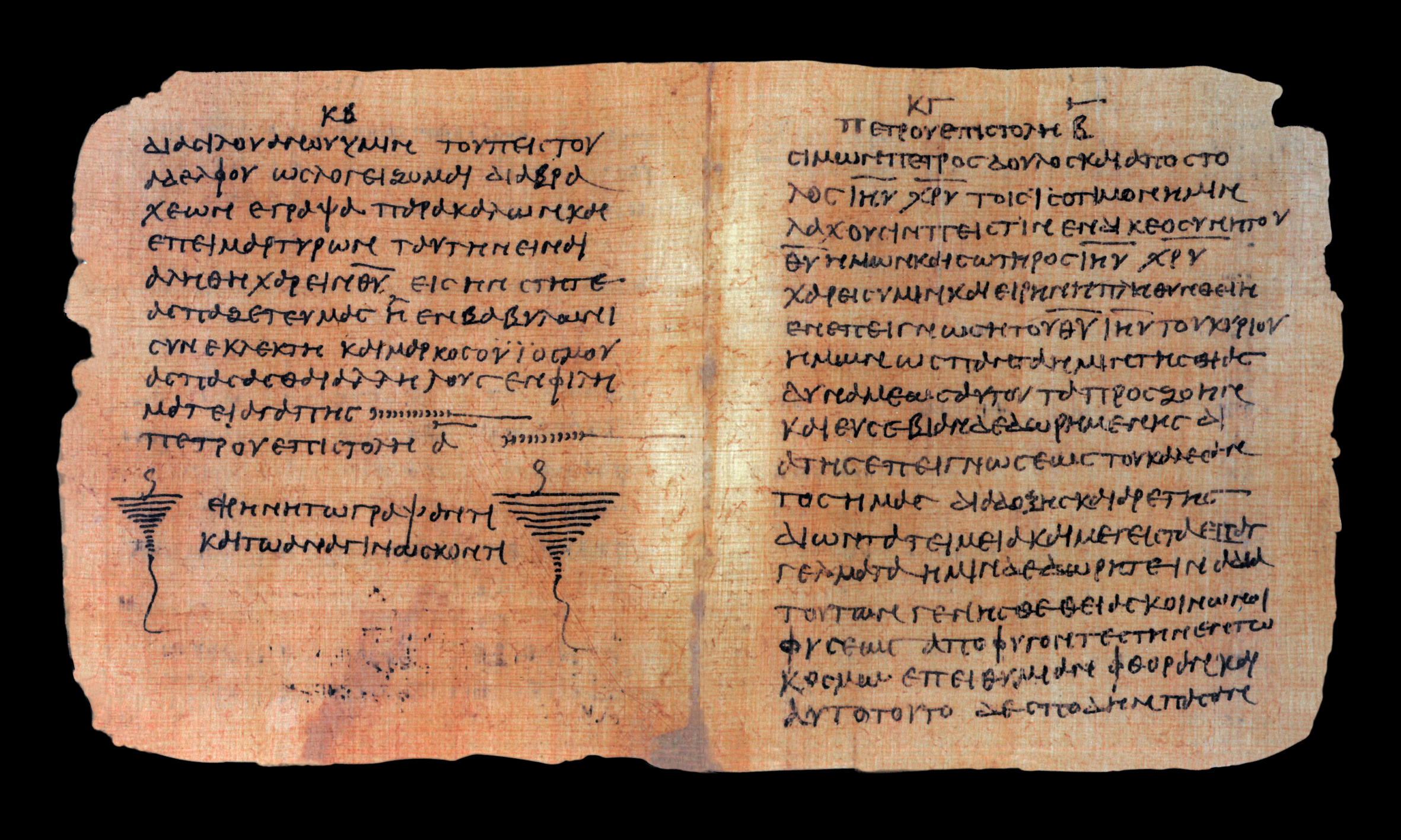
- 1 Peter 5:12–end and 2 Peter 1:1–5 on facing pages of Papyrus Bodmer VIII
- Name: Papyrus Bodmer VII-IX
- Sign: 𝔓^{72}
- Text: 1 Peter 1:1-5:14, 2 Peter 1:1-3:18, Jude 1:1-25
- Date: c. 200-400
- Script: Greek
- Now at: Cologny/Geneva; Vatican City, Bibl. Bodmeriana; Bibl. Vaticana
- Size: 14.5 by 16 cm
- Type: Alexandrian text-type
- Category: I
- Hand: documentary hand
- Note: resembles 𝔓^{50}

Papyrus 72 is the designation used by textual critics of the New Testament to describe portions of the so-called Bodmer Miscellaneous codex (Papyrus Bodmer VII-VIII), namely the letters of Jude, 1 Peter, and 2 Peter. These three books are collectively designated as 𝔓^{72} in the Gregory-Aland numbering of New Testament manuscripts. These books seem to have been copied by the same scribe. Using the study of comparative handwriting styles (paleography), the manuscript has been assigned to the 3rd or 4th century.

Although the letters of Jude (P.Bodmer VII) and 1-2 Peter (P.Bodmer VIII) in this codex do not form a single continuous text, scholars still tend to refer to these three texts as a single early New Testament papyrus.

== Description ==
The manuscript is a codex (precursor to the modern book). It is the earliest known manuscript of the epistles of Jude and 1 and 2 Peter in their entirety, though a few verses of Jude are in a fragment designated as 𝔓^{78} (P. Oxy. 2684).

P.Bodmer VII (Jude) and P.Bodmer VIII (1-2 Peter) form part of a single book (the Bodmer Miscellaneous Codex). This book appeared on the antiquities market in Egypt and was bought by the Swiss collector Martin Bodmer. (Note: Bodmer donated the letters of Peter, P.Bodmer VIII, to the Vatican in 1969. The complete make-up of the book is generally reconstructed as: The Nativity of Mary (P.Bodmer V), the apocryphal correspondence of Paul to the Corinthians (P.Bodmer X), the eleventh ode of Solomon (P.Bodmer XI), Jude (P.Bodmer VII), Melito's Homily on the Passover (P.Bodmer XIII), a fragment of a hymn (P.Bodmer XII), the Apology of Phileas (P.Bodmer XX), Psalm 33 and 34 (P.Bodmer IX), and 1-2 Peter (P.Bodmer VIII).) The same scribe who copied P.Bodmer VII and VIII is also thought to have copied P.Bodmer X and XI.

The manuscript contains the usual nomina sacra for Messiah, Jesus, God, Lord, Spirit, Father, plus a few non-standard ones: Δ̅Υ̅Μ̅Ι̅ (power), Σαρ̅ρ̅α̅ (Sarah), Αβρ̅α̅α̅μ (Abraham), Ν̅ω̅ε̅ (Noah), Μ̅ι̅χ̅α̅η̅ς̅ (Archangel Michael), and Εν̅ω̅χ (Enoch).

A facsimile edition of Bodmer Papyrus VIII was published in 2007 by Testimonio Compañía Editorial.

== Text ==
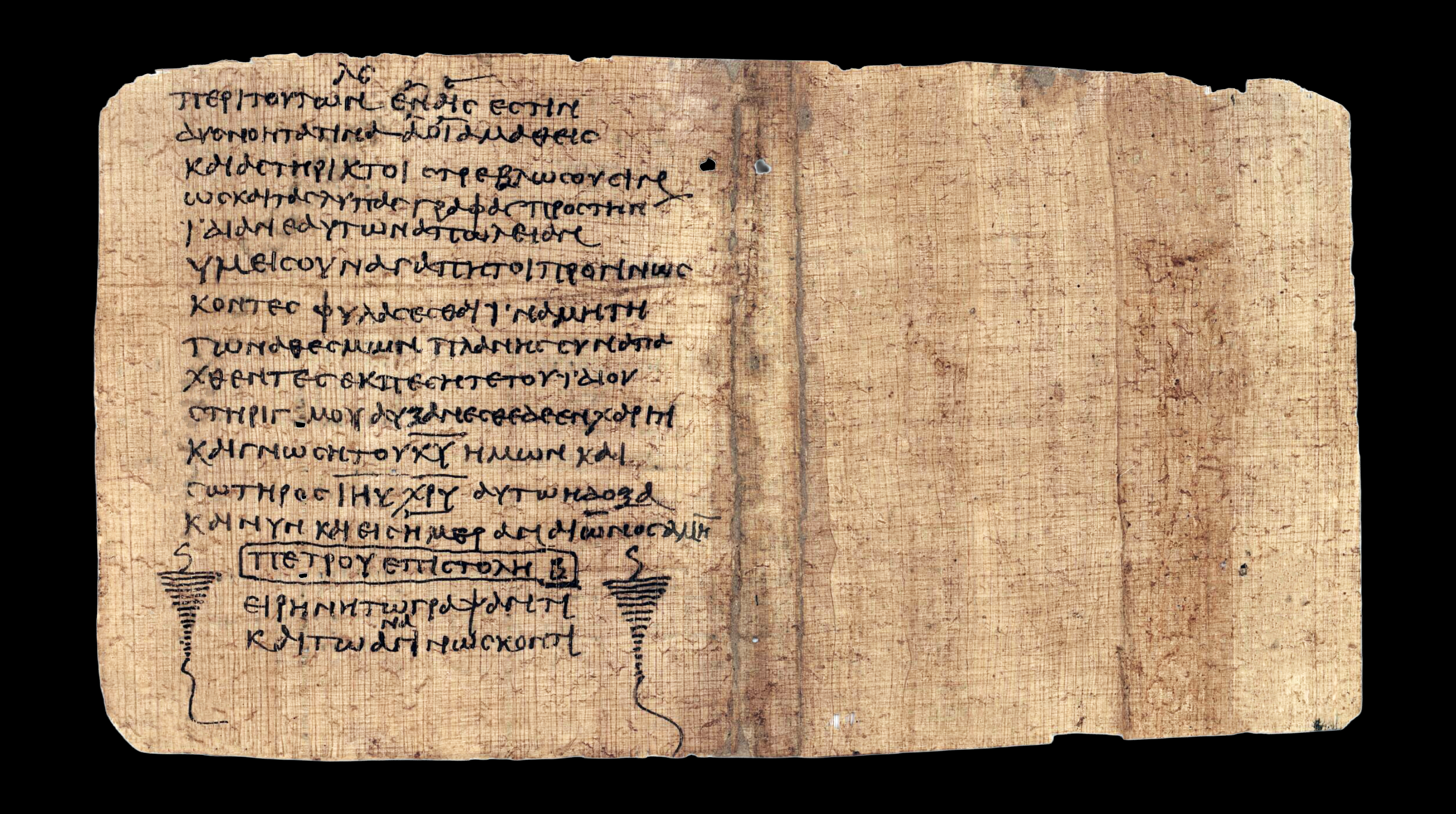
2 Peter 3:16-end

The Greek text of this codex is considered a representative of the Alexandrian text-type. According to biblical scholars Kurt and Barbara Aland, it has "normal" text in 1-2 Peter, but a "free" text in Jude, both with certain peculiarities. Aland placed it into Category I of his New Testament manuscript classification system. Category I is for manuscripts "of a very special quality, i.e., manuscripts with a very high proportion of the early text... To this category have also been assigned all manuscripts to the beginning of the fourth century, regardless of further distinctions which should also be observed, in order to include the witnesses of the period before the tradition was channeled into types..." The text is close to that seen in Codex Vaticanus and Codex Alexandrinus.

== See also ==
- List of New Testament papyri
- Bodmer Library
