= Dorothy J. Thompson =

Historian and classicist

Dorothy J. Thompson FBA
- Born: Dorothy Joan Walbank; 31 May 1939 (age 87)
- Other name: Dorothy J. Crawford
- Awards: Leverhulme Trust Research Fellowship (2002-2004)

Academic work
- Discipline: Archaeology
- Sub-discipline: Classical archaeology Egyptology
- Institutions: University of Cambridge; Princeton University; National Humanities Center

Dorothy Joan Thompson, FBA (born 31 May 1939) is an ancient historian and classicist who specialises in the culture and society of Hellenistic Egypt, the early Hellenistic world, and documentary papyrology.

== Career ==
Thompson was born in 1939, the daughter of historian F. W. Walbank and his wife Mary (née Fox). She was educated at Birkenhead High School for Girls and Girton College, Cambridge, where she graduated with BA (1961) and PhD (1965) degrees in Classics, and Bristol University, where she received a Certificate of Education in 1962.

In her research and writing Thompson employs the evidence of papyri to look at social and economic questions; she is further concerned with relations between the different ethnic groups of Ptolemaic and Roman Egypt. She has taught extensively at Cambridge (Isaac Newton Lectureship in the Faculty of Classics, 1992–2005) with a visiting professorship in 1996 at Princeton University. She was a Member of the Institute for Advanced Study at Princeton in 1982–1983 as well as a Fellow of the National Humanities Center, North Carolina in 1993–1994. Thompson was awarded a Research Fellowship from the Leverhulme Trust in 2002–2004.

Her 1988 book Memphis under the Ptolemies was awarded the 1989 James H. Breasted Prize by the American Historical Association.

From 2001 to 2007 Thompson served as president of the International Association of Papyrologists and still remains an Honorary President of that organisation. Other presidencies include the Cambridge Classical Association (1987–1990) and the Cambridge Philological Society (2002–2004). She was elected as a Fellow of British Academy in 1996 and is a current fellow of Girton College, Cambridge, and a bye-fellow of Clare College, Cambridge.

In 2013 she was awarded an honorary Doctor of Letters from the University of Liverpool.

Thompson formerly published work as Dorothy J. Crawford.

== Selected publications ==
- Thompson, D. J. 1988. Memphis under the Ptolemies.
- Thompson, D. J. 2003. "The Ptolemies and Egypt", in Erskine, E. Blackwell Companion to the Hellenistic World.
- Clarysse, W. and Thompson, D. J. 2006. Counting the People in Hellenistic Egypt.
- Thompson, D. J. 2011. "Slavery in the Hellenistic world", in Bradley, K. and Cartledge, P. The Cambridge World History of Slavery: Volume 1, The Ancient Mediterranean WorldI
