= Ronald S. Stroud =

Canadian historian (1933–2021)

- Born: 8 July 1933
- Died: 7 October 2021 (aged 88)
- Occupations: Historian; Professor

Ronald S. Stroud (8 July 1933 – 7 October 2021) was a Canadian historian, academic, archeologist, and epigraphist. He was the brother of philosopher Barry Stroud.

== Biography ==
Stroud was the brother of philosophy professor Barry Stroud. After graduating from the University of Toronto in 1957, he studied at the University of California, Berkeley, where he earned his doctorate in 1965. He then became an assistant professor there in 1969, and a full professor in 1972. He was awarded as a Klio Distinguished Professor of Classical Studies in 2001 and retired in 2007. In 1979, he became co-editor of Supplementum Epigraphicum Graecum. He also taught at the American School of Classical Studies at Athens.

Stroud was a member of the German Archaeological Institute and the American Philosophical Society. He died on 7 October 2021 at the age of 88.

== Publications ==
- Drakon’s Law on homicide (1968)
- The Axones and Kyrbeis of Drakon and Solon (1979)
- The sanctuary of Demeter and Kore. Part 3: Topography and architecture (1997)
- The Athenian grain-tax law of 374/3 B.C. (1998)
- The Athenian Empire on Stone (2006)
