= Trismegistos =

Trismegistos (also known as TM) is an interdisciplinary portal of papyrological and epigraphical resources, formerly Egypt and the Nile valley (800 BC-AD 800), now expanding to the Ancient World in general. It derives its name from the famous epithet of Hermes - Thoth, the Egyptian god of wisdom and writing who also played a major role in Greek religion and philosophy. Trismegistos is described as arguably one of the most important databases for papyrological research.

== History ==
Trismegistos is the result of intense collaboration between the Universities of Leuven and Cologne. The earliest history goes back to the long-term project Prosopographia Ptolemaica (PP) started by papyrologist Willy Peremans in 1937. This initially wanted to create a prosopography of Ptolemaic Egypt (332-30 BCE), starting with index cards containing data from several thousands of papyrus documents, and would include inscriptions on stone and other such surfaces. This included writing in Greek, Egyptian Hieroglyphs, hieratic, and Demotic.

There were a series of print publications of the PP project data issued between 1950-1981, including two volumes of corrections to the published volumes. These publications would cease however in the early 1980's, when the Computer made an appearance and all the PP data started to be moved onto a Computer database, initially starting with the data already on the previously used index cards. In the incumbent years, lack of funding and computer text-fonts not yet including particular language scripts required would become obstacles to the project, though work would continue due to university sponsored fellowships.

The scholar Willy Clarysse would set up two other projects of similar scope, with the Leuven Database of Ancient Books collecting information on Greek and Latin literary manuscripts written before 800 CE, and the Leuven Homepage of Papyrus Collections containing information on where the collections of papyri were situated throughout the world.

The current Trismegistos started in 2004 when Mark Depauw was granted a Sofja Kovalevskaja Award of the Alexander von Humboldt-Stiftung to set up his own research team at a German university, which would end up being the University of Cologne. The project, named as "Multilingualism and Multiculturalism in Graeco-Roman Egypt", desired to investigate language shifts in relation to cultural identity, by setting up an online database of Graeco-Roman papyrological material in Egyptian scripts. This was originally set to be used in parallel with and in close cooperation with the existing tools of Greek papyrology such as the Heidelberger Gesamtverzeichnis grechischer Urkunden aus Agypten (HGV), and the Leuven Database of Ancient Books (LDAB). From this new platform, those factors which influenced language preferences would then be analyzed. Trismegistos would come to incorporate the already in-use papyrological databases contained within both the HGB and the LDAB, with other projects also providing data to be used by Trismegistos such as the Brussels Coptic Database (BCD), and Aramaic Texts from Egypt (ATE).

From late 2008 onwards, the focus of Trismegistos has been on people and places, but in 2010 the idea grew to expand Trismegistos further to include texts from outside Egypt. Since 2012 Trismegistos also includes unpublished texts for which information is available in online repositories.

From January 2020: a subscription model was implemented, and many functionalities (including functional search in most categories) are available only for paying institutions. A fundraising campaign, Keep TM Alive, is in operation.
