= Supplementum Epigraphicum Graecum =

- Discipline: Greek inscriptions
- Language: English

Publication details
- History: 1923–present
- Publisher: Brill

Standard abbreviations
- ISO 4: Suppl. Epigr. Graecum

Indexing
- ISSN: 0920-8399

Links
- Journal homepage

Supplementum Epigraphicum Graecum (SEG) (Latin for Greek Epigraphical Supplement) is an annual survey (published by J. C. Gieben, Amsterdam, Netherlands until his death in 2006, now published by Brill) collecting the content of and studies on Greek inscriptions published in a single year. New inscriptions have full Greek text and critical apparatus, and studies of older inscriptions have brief summaries. The survey covers publications of inscriptions from the entire Greek world, although material later than the 8th-century A.D. is not included. Each issue contains the academic yield of a single year, delayed for a few years (e.g The volume of SEG published in 2018 contained all inscriptions and academic briefs published in 2014)

== Contents ==
SEG is a systematic collection of Greek inscriptions (which are presented with original critical apparatuses) and neutral summaries of new research into Greek inscriptions, which had been published in a certain year. There is some exception to this, as a small number of texts every volume are transcribed from photographs that have been made available, despite the fact they remain unpublished. All Greek inscriptions are transcribed according to the Leiden Conventions.

Any entry for an inscription in a volume of SEG is included with three components: the editorial component, which presents the Greek inscription's text alongside critical apparatuses and summaries of interpretations; the bibliographic component, which consists of a bibliography of relevant articles, monographs and other publications; the epigraphic or thematic component, which is a collection of metadata on the inscription, including its provenance (date, place), language, purpose, and its type (public documents, dedications, epitaphs, miscellaneous).

These texts are arranged geographically, as per the order of Inscriptiones Graecae (from Attica (IG 1) to Sicily-Italy (IG XIV), subdivided into alphabetically arranged cities), and after that by date. Inscriptions of an unknown provenance are included separately from the others. At the end of the volumes, there are large indices for the topics of and entries on the inscriptions. These are subdivided into: Names, Kings, Emperors, Geography, Religion, Military, Greek and Latin Terms, and Selected Topics.

== History ==
SEG was founded in 1923 by the Dutch scholar J. J. E. Hondius in Leiden, Netherlands. Hondius' aim was for all Greek inscriptions to be collected in one publication, simplifying scholarly referencing. Hondius published volumes I through XI between 1922 and 1940. After a hiatus, from 1940 to 1955, A. G. Woodhead took over as editor. He published volumes XII through XXV between 1951 and 1971. After that, there was another hiatus until the publication was revived by Henk W. Pleket and Ronald S. Stroud in 1976, who modernized SEG and transformed it into the publication that still persists today.

The current editors of SEG are: Angelos Chaniotis, Thomas Corsten, Nikolaos Papazarkadas, and Eftychia Stavrianopoulou. These editors are advised by 3 associate editors, 3 assistant editors and 10 advisory editors. In 2009, Brill launched the Supplementum Epigraphicum Graecum Online (SEG Online), which allows online access to the texts of SEG to Brill subscribers. As of 19 May 2023, 66 volumes have been published.
