= EpiDoc =

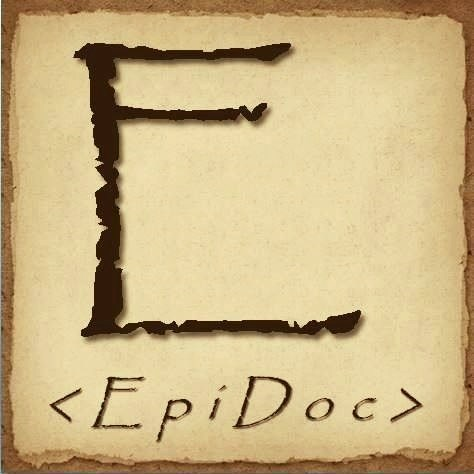
EpiDoc logo

EpiDoc is an international community that produces guidelines and tools for encoding in TEI XML scholarly and educational editions of ancient documents, especially inscriptions and papyri.

The EpiDoc Guidelines were originally proposed as a recommendation for Greek and Latin epigraphy in 2000 by scholars at the University of North Carolina at Chapel Hill: Tom Elliott, the former director of the Ancient World Mapping Center, with Hugh Cayless and Amy Hawkins. The guidelines have since matured considerably through extensive discussion on the community mailing list (Markup) and other discussion fora, at several conferences, and through the experience of various pilot projects. The first major epigraphic projects to adopt and pilot the EpiDoc recommendations were the Inscriptions of Aphrodisias, U.S. Epigraphy Project and Vindolanda Tablets Online in 2002–4, and the guidelines reached a degree of stability for the first time in that period.

EpiDoc has since been adopted as the native format for the Greek Papyrology site, Papyri.info. The EpiDoc schema and guidelines may also be applied, perhaps with some local modification to related palaeographical fields including Sigillography, and Numismatics.

The EpiDoc community maintains the Guidelines and other tools, offers support through the mailing list and other fora, and runs several training events per year.

== Guidelines and schema ==
The EpiDoc Guidelines are available in two forms:

1. the stable guidelines, released periodically
2. the source code, available in its most up-to-date form in the EpiDoc SourceForge repository. The Guidelines source files are a series of XML documents, plus XSLT to transform them to the web version.

The EpiDoc Schema is also available in two forms:

1. the latest stable version of the schema, which may be linked to directly by XML documents.
2. the source code (a TEI ODD), available in its most up-to-date form in the EpiDoc SourceForge repository.

== Tools ==
Other tools developed by and for the EpiDoc community include:

- The EpiDoc Reference Stylesheets (XSLT), available from the EpiDoc GitHub repository. These stylesheets are also used to deliver the online Guidelines.
- EFES (EpiDoc Front-End Services): an "out of the box" software package for the publication of EpiDoc collections.
- Transcoder: a Java tool for converting between Beta Code, Unicode NF C, Unicode NF D, and GreekKeys encoding for Greek script on the fly.

== Projects ==
- Ancient Inscriptions of the Northern Black Sea, King's College London
- Concordia, King's College London and New York University
- Inscriptions of Aphrodisias, King's College London, UK
- Inscriptions of Roman Cyrenaica, King's College London, UK
- Integrating Digital Papyrology (Duke University, Columbia University, Heidelberg University, King's College London, University of Kentucky)
- US Epigraphy Project, Brown University, Providence RI, USA
- Vindolanda Tablets Online, Oxford University, UK
- Monumenta Asiae Minoris Antiqua XI, Oxford University, UK
- Corpus of the Inscriptions of Campā, École française d'Extrême-Orient
- Epigraphic Database Heidelberg

Fuller list of projects maintained at:

- https://wiki.digitalclassicist.org/Category:EpiDoc

== Bibliography ==
- Fernando-Luis Álvarez, Elena García-Barriocanal and Joaquín-L. Gómez-Pantoja, 'Sharing Epigraphic Information as Linked Data', in (eds. Sanchez-Alonso & Athanasiadis), Metadata and semantic research (Springer 2010), pp. 222–234. Available: https://doi.org/10.1007%2F978-3-642-16552-8_21 (PAYWALL) (accessed 2011-01-06)
- Lisa Anderson and Heidi Wendt, 'Ancient Relationships, Modern Intellectual Horizons: The practical challenges and possibilities of encoding Greek and Latin inscriptions.' In ed. M.T. Rutz & M.M. Kersel, Archaeologies of Text: Archaeology, Technology, and Ethics. Oxbow Books, 2014 (Joukowsky Institute Publication 6). Pp. 164–175.
- Alison Babeu, 'Epigraphy', "Rome Wasn’t Digitized in a Day": Building a Cyberinfrastructure for Digital Classicists Draft Version 1.3—11/18/10, pp. 73–89. CLIR, 2010. Online at: https://www.clir.org/pubs/reports/pub150
- Roger S. Bagnall, 'Integrating Digital Papyrology', presented at Online Humanities Scholarship: The Shape of Things to Come, University of Virginia, March 26–28, 2010. Available: https://archive.nyu.edu/handle/2451/29592 (accessed 2011-01-06)
- Monica Berti (2015). "The Linked Fragment: TEI and the Encoding of Text Reuses of Lost Authors." _Journal of the TEI_ 8 (2014–15). Available: http://doi.org/10.4000/jtei.1218
- Gabriel Bodard, 'The Inscriptions of Aphrodisias as electronic publication: A user's perspective and a proposed paradigm' in Digital Medievalist 4 (2008), available http://doi.org/10.16995/dm.19 (accessed 2011-01-06)
- Gabriel Bodard, 'EpiDoc: Epigraphic Documents in XML for Publication and Interchange', in (ed. F. Feraudi-Gruénais) Latin On Stone: epigraphic research and electronic archives (Lexington Books, 2010), pp. 101–118.
- Gabriel Bodard, 'Digital Epigraphy and Lexicographical and Onomastic Markup'. Pre-press available: http://www.stoa.org/archives/1226 (accessed 2011-01-06)
- Bodard, G and Stoyanova, S. 2016. "Epigraphers and Encoders: Strategies for Teaching and Learning Digital Epigraphy." In: Bodard, G & Romanello, M (eds.) Digital Classics Outside the Echo-Chamber: Teaching, Knowledge Exchange & Public Engagement, Pp. 51–68. London: Ubiquity Press. DOI: https://dx.doi.org/10.5334/bat.d.
- Gabriel Bodard and Polina Yordanova. 2020. "Publication, Testing and Visualization with EFES: A tool for all stages of the EpiDoc editing process." Studia Digitalia Universitatis Babeș-Bolyai 65.1 (2020), pp. 17–35. Available: https://doi.org/10.24193/subbdigitalia.2020.1.02 (accessed 2021-03-25)
- Hugh Cayless, Charlotte Roueché, Tom Elliott & Gabriel Bodard, 'Epigraphy in 2017', Digital Humanities Quarterly 3.1 (2009), available: https://digitalhumanities.org/dhq/vol/3/1/000030/000030.html (accessed 2011-01-06)
- Annamaria De Santis and Irene Rossi, 2018. Crossing Experiences in Digital Epigraphy: From Practice to Discipline. De Gruyter Open. Available: https://doi.org/10.1515/9783110607208
- Dee, S, Foradi, M and Šarić, F. 2016. "Learning By Doing: Learning to Implement the TEI Guidelines Through Digital Classics Publication." In: Bodard, G & Romanello, M (eds.) Digital Classics Outside the Echo-Chamber: Teaching, Knowledge Exchange & Public Engagement, Pp. 15–32. London: Ubiquity Press. DOI: https://dx.doi.org/10.5334/bat.b
- Julia Flanders & Charlotte Roueché, 'Introduction for Epigraphers', online at http://www.stoa.org/epidoc/gl/latest/intro-eps.html (accessed 2014-01-13)
- Petra Heřmánková, Vojtěch Kaše & Adéla Sobotková. 2021. “Inscriptions as data: digital epigraphy in macro-historical perspective.” Journal of Digital History 1, Scalable historiography: Storytelling, Hermeneutics, Data. Available: https://journalofdigitalhistory.org/en/article/WBqfZzfi7nHK (accessed 2022-01-19)
- Tamar Kalkhitashvili. (2022). Digital Edition of the Inscriptions of Georgia. KADMOS 14, 7–32. DOI: https://doi.org/10.32859/kadmos/14/7-32.
- Liuzzo, Pietro Maria. "Chapter 2: Comparing Inscriptions" _Digital Approaches to Ethiopian and Eritrean Studies_. Aethiopica Supplement 8. Harrassowitz Verlag, 2019. Pp. 47–74. Available: https://doi.org/10.2307/j.ctvrnfr3q.
- Löser, Laura (2014), "Meeting the Needs of Today’s Audiences of Epigraphy with Digital Editions." In Orlandi, Santucci et al., Information Technologies for Epigraphy and Cultural Heritage. Proceedings of the First EAGLE International Conference. Rome. Pp. 231–254. Available: https://www.eagle-network.eu/wp-content/uploads/2015/01/Paris-Conference-Proceedings.pdf#5f
- Anne Mahoney, 'Epigraphy', in (eds. Burnard, O'Brian & Unsworth) Electronic Textual Editing (2006), preview online at http://www.tei-c.org/Activities/ETE/Preview/mahoney.xml (accessed: 2006-04-07)
- Silvia Orlandi, Raffaella Santucci, Vittore Casarosa, Pietro Maria Liuzzo (eds.), Information Technologies for Epigraphy and Cultural Heritage. Proceedings of the first EAGLE International Conference, Rome, 2014. On line at: http://www.eagle-network.eu/wp-content/uploads/2015/01/Paris-Conference-Proceedings.pdf
- Charlotte Roueché & Gabriel Bodard, 'The Epidoc Aphrodisias Pilot Project', Forum Archaeologiae 23/VI/2002, online at http://farch.net (accessed: 2006-04-07)
- Charlotte Roueché, 'Digitizing Inscribed Texts', in Text Editing, Print and the Digital World (Ashgate, 2008) pp. 159–168.
- Joshua D. Sosin, 'Digital Papyrology', Congress of the International Association of Papyrologists, 19 August 2010, Geneva. Available: http://www.stoa.org/archives/1263 (accessed 2011-01-06)
- Charlotte Tupman, 'Contextual epigraphy and XML: digital publication and its application to the study of inscribed funerary monuments', in (eds. Bodard & Mahony) Digital Research in the Study of Classical Antiquity (Ashgate, 2010), pp. 73–86.
- Irene Vagionakis, “Cretan Institutional Inscriptions: A New EpiDoc Database”, Journal of the Text Encoding Initiative, 21 September 2021. Available: https://doi.org/10.4000/jtei.3570
- Daniel A. Werning (2016), 'Towards guidelines for TEI encoding of text artefacts in Egyptology'. In Monica Berti (ed.), Epigraphy Edit-a-thon. Editing chronological and geographic data in ancient inscriptions. Leipzig, April 20–22, 2016.

== See also ==
- Leiden Conventions
- Epigraphy
- Text Encoding Initiative
- Digital Classicist
- Inscriptions of Aphrodisias
