= Egyptian script =

Egyptian script may mean:

- Egyptian hieroglyphs
- Egyptian hieratic
- Egyptian demotic
