= Third Epistle to the Corinthians =

Apocryphal New Testament text

The Third Epistle to the Corinthians is an early Christian text written by an unknown author claiming to be Paul the Apostle. It is also found in the Acts of Paul, and was framed as Paul's response to a letter of the Corinthians to Paul. The earliest extant copy is Papyrus Bodmer X, dating to the third century. Originally written in Koine Greek, the letter survives in Greek, Coptic, Latin, and Armenian manuscripts.

== Content and theological background ==
The text is structured as an attempt to correct alleged misinterpretations of the earlier First and Second Epistles to the Corinthians, of which the author (usually called "pseudo-Paul") has become aware due to the (similarly pseudepigraphic) Epistle of the Corinthians to Paul, which is paired with Paul's response as a single correspondence. According to the preceding part of the Acts of Paul, when the letter was written Paul was in prison, on account of Stratonice, the wife of Apollophanes. The epistle seems to attack themes associated with Gnostic Christianity and docetism, albeit loosely. 3 Corinthians emphasizes the importance of the flesh: that the Incarnation of Jesus had been as a real flesh-and-blood person, rather than a divine apparition or spirit that only appeared to suffer. Jesus will "redeem all flesh through his own flesh", and "by his own body Jesus Christ saved all flesh." Against Gnosticism, the letter condemns those who "assert that heaven and earth and all that is in them are not a work of God", an apparent attack on the Gnostic belief that the material world was the work of a different god, the Demiurge.

Before the Bodmer X papyrus was discovered, it was generally assumed that 3 Corinthians had been written as part of the Acts of Paul. The Bodmer X version, however, is older than the oldest surviving copies of the Acts of Paul, and has only the Epistle of the Corinthians and Paul's response. It does not include the narrative introductions to each letter seen in later works or the rest of the Acts of Paul. Additionally, the correspondence does not entirely line up with the events described elsewhere: the correspondence indicates that heresy is a major problem in Corinth, while the narrative makes no such claim when Paul arrives in the city; Paul is instead pleased with the progress of the believers. Cleobius is presented as an arch-heretic stirring up trouble in the correspondence, yet in the narrative he is a spirit-filled Christian. This has caused most scholars to believe that the epistle predated the Acts of Paul, and the Acts of Paul was compiling and merging existing letters and stories rather than creating a single combined work.

== Authorship ==
Scholars do not accept the epistle's claimed authorship of Paul for a number of reasons. While the epistle contains a number of Pauline themes and similar phrasings taken from First and Second Corinthians, it varies from Paul in ways difficult to square with his authorship. Notably, Paul draws a sharp distinction in his undisputed letters between "flesh" (sarx) and "body" (soma). To Paul, flesh is the negative aspects of human sin and temptation that are left behind; but the body of Christians will be resurrected. In 3 Corinthians, however, flesh is given an unambiguous positive connotation: the flesh of believers will be resurrected, in contradiction to Paul's claim that "flesh and blood cannot inherit the kingdom of God" (1 Corinthians 15:50). The letter places no importance on the death of Jesus and omits any discussion of Jewish Law, popular themes for Paul to discuss, eschewing them for themes seen nowhere else in Paul's work such as the story of the bones of the prophet Elisha.

== Canonicity ==
In the Western Roman Empire, the epistle was not included in the Biblical canon that was formed in the 4th century AD. It was relegated to New Testament apocrypha. In early traditions of the Eastern Roman Empire and the Syriac Orthodox Church, Aphrahat (c. 340) treated it as canonical and Ephrem the Syrian (d. 373) apparently accepted it as canonical, because he wrote a commentary on it. The Doctrine of Addai includes it, but it was not included in the Syriac Peshitta translation of the Bible (but nor were 2–3 John, 2 Peter, Jude, or Revelation, which are almost universally recognized as canonical, see also Antilegomena). The only place 3 Corinthians survived as part of the canon into the medieval age was in the Armenian Apostolic tradition. Although part of the Oskan Armenian Bible of 1666, it was in an Appendix to the Zohrab Armenian Bible of 1805 which follows the Vulgate canon, and it is not currently considered part of the Armenian Orthodox New Testament. It was not part of the canon list of Anania Shirakatsi in the 7th century but is part of the canon lists of Hovhannes Imastaser (11th century), Mekhitar of Ayrivank (13th century), and Gregory of Tatev (14th century).

According to the 1913 Catholic Encyclopedia:

The ancient Syrian (Edessene) Church revered as canonical a Third Epistle of St. Paul to the Corinthians, which is accompanied by a letter from the pastors of that Church, to which it is an answer. But about the beginning of the fifth century the Syrian Church fell under the influence of the Greek, and in consequence the spurious letter gradually lost its canonical status. It was taken up by the neighbouring Armenians and for centuries has formed a part of the Armenian New Testament. Latin and Greek writers are completely silent about this pseudograph, although Greek and Latin copies have been found. It was obviously suggested by the lost genuine Pauline letter referred to in I Cor. v, 9; vii, 1. It was composed by a presbyter about 160–170, and is a disguised attack on some of the leading errors of Gnosticism. This correspondence long had an independent circulation, but recently it has been proved that the document was incorporated into the Acts of St. Paul (q.v.).
