= Pythia (machine learning) =

Pythia is an ancient text restoration model that recovers missing characters from damaged text input using deep neural networks. It was created by Yannis Assael, Thea Sommerschield, and Jonathan Prag, researchers from Google DeepMind and the University of Oxford.

To study the society and the history of ancient civilisations, ancient history relies on disciplines such as epigraphy, the study of ancient inscribed texts. Hundreds of thousands of these texts, known as inscriptions, have survived to our day, but are often damaged over the centuries. Illegible parts of the text must then be restored by specialists, called epigraphists, in order to extract meaningful information from the text and use it to expand our knowledge of the context in which the text was written. Pythia takes as input the damaged text, and is trained to return hypothesised restorations of ancient Greek inscriptions, working as an assistive aid for ancient historians. Its neural network architecture works at both the character- and word-level, thereby effectively handling long-term context information, and dealing efficiently with incomplete word representations. Pythia is applicable to any discipline dealing with ancient texts (philology, papyrology, codicology) and can work in any language (ancient or modern).
