= Leiden Conventions =

Symbols for marking text from manuscripts

The Leiden Conventions or Leiden system is an established set of rules, symbols, and brackets used to indicate the condition of an epigraphic or papyrological text in a modern edition. In previous centuries of classical scholarship, scholars who published texts from inscriptions, papyri, or manuscripts used divergent conventions to indicate the condition of the text and editorial corrections or restorations. The Leiden meeting was designed to help redress this confusion.

The earliest form of the conventions was agreed at a meeting of classical scholars at the University of Leiden in the Netherlands in 1931, and published the following year. There are minor variations in the use of the conventions between epigraphy and papyrology (and even between Greek and Latin epigraphy). More recently, scholars have published improvements and adjustments to the system.

== Most important sigla ==
| siglum | explanation |
|---|---|
| ạḅ | Letters unclear, or imperfectly preserved or executed, ambiguous without consideration of context. |
| ... | Illegible letters, not restored by the editor (extent known or approximately known, one dot per letter). Example: three illegible letters. In some conventions, numbers between two dashes may be used for extended areas, instead of individual dots; in this case, approximation may be expressed with plus-minus sign (±) replacing the first dash, or "c." or circa before the number. |
| [...] | Letters missing, not restored by the editor (extent known or approximately known, one dot per letter). Example: three letters missing. In some conventions, numbers between two dashes may be used for extended areas, instead of individual dots; in this case, approximation may be expressed with plus-minus sign (±) replacing the first dash, or "c." or circa before the number. |
| [ or [ ] or ] | Letters missing, not restored by the editor, extent unknown. |
| [abc] | Letters missing, restored by the editor. |
| ⟨ ⟩ or *** | Letters erroneously omitted by the text, not restored by the editor. |
| ⟨abc⟩ | Letters erroneously omitted by the text, restored by the editor. |
| a(bc) | Abbreviation in the text, expanded or resolved by the editor. Doubtful expansion should be expressed with a question mark before the closing parenthesis: a(bc?). |
| {abc} | Letters considered erroneous and superfluous by the editor. If illegible, an individual letter is expressed by a single dot each. Doubtful letters are marked by a subscript dot. |
| ⟦abc⟧ | Rasura: a deletion which can be restored. In this example, the letters abc were deleted, but are still legible or can be restored from context. Deletions may alternatively be specified in the apparatus. |
| \abc/ | Interlinear addition of letters in the text itself. In this example, the letters abc were added between lines. These sigla are used when interlinear text is otherwise difficult to represent as such typographically. |
| | No sigla were suggested for corruptions (i.e. letters that are legible or restorable, but not understood). Instead, it was proposed that these should be dealt with in an apparatus. |
| | No sigla were suggested for literary corrections. Instead, it was proposed that these should be dealt with in an apparatus or in a commentary. |

== See also ==
- Corpus Inscriptionum Latinarum
- Ellipsis
- EpiDoc
- Lacuna (manuscripts)
- Primary source
- Supplementum Epigraphicum Graecum

== General and cited references ==
- Marcus Dohnicht, "Zusammenstellung der diakritischen Zeichen zur Wiedergabe der lateinischen Inschrifttexte der Antike für den Unicode" (Entwurf Juli 2000).
- Sterling Dow, "Conventions in editing: a suggested reformulation of the Leiden System", Greek, Roman and Byzantine Studies Scholarly Aids 2, Durham, 1969.
- Tom Elliott et al. (2000–2026), "All Transcription Guidelines" in EpiDoc Guidelines.
- Traianos Gagos (1996), "Conventions", in A Select Bibliography of Papyrology.
- J. J. E. Hondius, "Praefatio", Suplementum Epigraphicum Graecum 7 (1934), p. i.
- A. S. Hunt, "A note on the transliteration of papyri", Chronique d'Égypte 7 (1932), pp. 272–274.
- Hans Krummrey, Silvio Panciera, "Criteri di edizione e segni diacritici", Tituli 2 (1980), pp. 205–215.
- Silvio Panciera, "Struttura dei supplementi e segni diacritici dieci anni dopo" in SupIt 8 (1991), pp. 9–21.
- Louis Robert, Jeanne Robert, "La Carie : histoire et géographie historique", II, Paris, 1954, pp. 9–11 on "Signes critiques du corpus et édition".
- Onno van Nijf, "Critical Signs: Leiden system plus additions"
- Joshua D. Sosin et al. (2011), "Papyrological Conventions used in Duke Databank texts".
- B. A. van Groningen, "De signis criticis in edendo adhibendis", Mnemosyne 59 (1932), pp. 362–365.
- B. A. van Groningen, "Projet d'unification des systèmes de signes critiques", Chronique d'Égypte 7 (1932), pp. 262–269.
- Ulrich Wilcken, "Das Leydener Klammersystem", Archiv für Papyrusforschung 10 (1932), pp. 211–212.

Leiden usage in corpora

- L'Année épigraphique, Presses Universitaires de France (Revue archéologique. Supplément 1888–1964; autonomous 1965–). (See front matter.)
- Corpus Inscriptionum Latinarum, Berlin: de Gruyter, 1853–. (Conventions at front.)
- Oxyrhynchus Papyri, Egypt Exploration Society, 1898–. (See preface.)
- Supplementum Epigraphicum Graecum, Lugduni Batavorum: Sijthoff, 1923–. (See front matter.)
