= Acts of Paul =

New Testament apocrypha

The Acts of Paul is one of the major works and earliest pseudepigraphal series from the New Testament apocrypha also known as Apocryphal Acts. This work is part of a body of literature either about or purporting to be written by Paul the Apostle, including letters, narratives, prayers, and apocalypses. An approximate date given to the Acts of Paul is 100-160 AD. The Acts of Paul were first mentioned by Tertullian, who deemed the work to be heretical. He mentioned that the writings "wrongly go under Paul's name" and was "augmenting Paul's fame from his own store". Eusebius wrote that, unlike other writings which were classified as antilegomena in some instances, the Acts of Paul were always classified among the disputed. The Acts of Paul may have been considered orthodox by Hippolytus of Rome but were eventually regarded as heretical when the Manichaeans started using the texts. The author of the Acts of Paul is unknown, but probably came from a Christian community in Asia Minor that revered Paul. The work does not use the canonical Acts of the Apostles as a source; instead it relies on oral traditions of Paul's missionary work. The text is primarily known from Greek manuscripts. The discovery of a Coptic language version of the text demonstrated that the text was composed of:

- The Acts of Paul and Thecla
- The Third Epistle to the Corinthians
- The Martyrdom of the Holy Apostle Paul

All of these constituent parts were often considered worth treating as separate texts and frequently appeared independently, leading to speculation that the Acts of Paul may have been compiling disparate stories into one work, although other parts scholars believe to be original to the Acts of Paul. Besides the three main sections mentioned above, the remainder of the Acts of Paul exist only in fragments from the 3rd and 5th centuries:

- The Healing of Hermocrates from Dropsy
- The Strife of the Ephesian Beasts

The texts are a coherent whole and are generally thought to have been written by one author using oral traditions, rather than basing it on any of the other apocrypha or the orthodox canon. The main emphasis of the text is on chastity and anti-Gnosticism. According to Tertullian, the author was a priest in Asia Minor. Tertullian mentions that after the priest wrote the work adding his own ideas to Paul's fame, the priest was "convicted" and "was removed from his office".

== Overview ==
The Acts of Paul — which was declared to be antilegomena by Eusebius in his Church History — consists of narratives depicting Paul's preaching and other activities, such as the Acts of Paul and Thecla, Paul's Correspondence With the Corinthians, and the Martyrdom of the Holy Apostle Paul.

Paul's Correspondence With the Corinthians was written roughly a century after the death of Paul, with the intention of correcting perceived misinterpretations of Paul's first and second epistles, as well as to counter certain Gnostic teachings. This work consists of two letters. The first letter is the Epistle of the Corinthians to Paul, in which the author tells the story of how two presbyters had come to Corinth, preaching "pernicious words". Specifically, they claimed that God is not almighty, there is no resurrection of the body, man was not created by God, Christ had not come in the flesh, nor was he born of Mary, and the world was created not by God but rather by angels. The second letter is Paul's response to the first. In this letter, the author repudiates all of the claims made by the two presbyters.

The Martyrdom of the Holy Apostle Paul tells the story of Paul's last days in Rome. Upon learning that Paul had resurrected a young man who had died after falling from a parapet, Nero became fearful that the Roman Empire might be overthrown by the Christians. This was the event that precipitated the Neronian persecution of Christians in general, as well as the specific order to behead Paul. According to this work, when Paul was beheaded, milk — rather than blood — spurted from his neck.

Richard J. Bauckham argues that the author of the Acts of Paul drew directly from 2 Timothy, 1 Clement, in addition to 1 and 2 Corinthians to write a sequel to the Acts of the Apostles based on their understanding of Paul’s final years. The anonymous writer used the structure of Jewish exegesis and ancient biography, and he considered it not to be in the genre of novel, but resembling a "novelistic biography" being more biographical than Lukan Acts, but also more.

== See also ==
- Acts of Paul and Thecla
- Acts of Peter and Paul
- Apocalypse of Paul
- Coptic Apocalypse of Paul
- Correspondence of Paul and Seneca
- Epistle to the Laodiceans
- Leucius Charinus
- Prayer of the Apostle Paul

== Bibliography ==
- Bremmer, Jan N, ed. (1996), The Apocryphal Acts of Paul and Thecla.
- von Gebhardt, Oscar, ed. (1883), "Passio S. Theclae virginis; Die lateinischen Übersetzungen der Acta Pauli et Theclae nebst Fragmenten, Auszügen und Beilagen herausgegeben" [Passion of S. Theclae], Texte und Untersuchungen zur Geschichte der altchristlichen Literatur, NF (in Latin), 22, Leipzig (Latin Texts, critical edition, German commentary on the versions).
- Richard Adelbert Lipsius, Maximilian Bonnet (editors): Acta apostolorum apocrypha vol. 1 1891. pp. 104–17, 235–72 (Greek text).
- Richard I. Pervo: The Acts of Paul: A New Translation with Introduction and Commentary. Cambridge: James Clarke & Co, 2014 (ISBN 978 0 227 17461 6).
- Eckhard Plümacher: Paulys Realencyclopädie der Classischen Altertumswissenschaft, Supplement, 1978, col. 24–30; 51; 59–61.
- Willy Rordorf: Lex orandi, lex credendi, 1993, p. 368-496.
- Carl Schmidt (editor): Acta Pauli aus der Heidelberger koptischen Papyrushandschrift Nr. 1, Herausgegeben von Carl Schmidt, Übersetzungen, Untersuchungen und Koptischer Text, Hinrichs, Leipzig 1904. (Coptic Text, German translation + commentary).
- Carl Schmidt: Acta Pauli, Übersetzung Untersuchungen und koptischer Text, zweite erweiterte Ausgabe ohne Tafeln, Hinrichs, Leipzig 1905 (1964 reprint). (Enhanced edition without the plates)
- Carl Schmidt (editor): Πράξεις Παύλου; Acta Pauli. Nach dem Papyrus der Hamburger Staats- und Universitäts-Bibliothek, unter Mitarbeit von Wilhelm Schubart. Veröffentlichungen aus der Hamburger Staats- und Universitätsbibliothek. Neue Folge der Veröffentlichungen aus der Hamburger Stadtbibliothek, Herausgegeben von Gustav Wahl, J. J. Augustin in Glückstadt und Hamburg 1936 (Greek text, German translation and commentary).
- Wilhelm Schneemelcher (editor): Neutestamentliche Apokryphen in deutscher Übersetzung, Bd II Apostolisches, Apokalypsen und Verwandtes, 6. Aufl. Tübingen 1997. p. 193–243.
- Testuz, Michel, ed. (1959), "Correspondance apocryphe des Corinthiens et de l'apôtre Paul : manuscrit du IIIe siècle" [Apocryphal Correspondence between the Corinthians and the Apostle Paul: Manuscript from the Third Century], Papyrus Bodmer 10/12, Bibliotheca Bodmeriana (in Greek), Cologny-Genève: Michel Testuz: 1–45 (II Cor.)
- Paul Vetter: Der apokryhe 3. Korintherbrief, Mechitharisten-Buchdruckerei Wien 1894. (Armenian text of 3. Kor.)
