= Papyrology =

Scientific study of ancient manuscripts

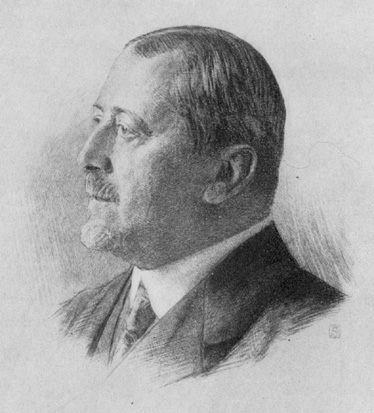
Joseph von Karabacek (1845–1918), a leading authority in the field of papyrology (circa 1910)

Papyrology is the study of manuscripts of ancient literature, correspondence, legal archives, etc., preserved on portable media from antiquity, the most common form of which is papyrus, the principal writing material in the ancient civilizations of Egypt, Greece, and Rome. Papyrology includes both the translation and interpretation of ancient documents in a variety of languages as well as the care and conservation of rare papyrus originals.

Papyrology as a systematic discipline dates from the 1880s and 1890s, when large caches of well-preserved papyri were discovered by archaeologists in several locations in Egypt, such as Arsinoe (Faiyum) and Oxyrhynchus. Leading centres of papyrology include Oxford University, Heidelberg University, the Ägyptisches Museum und Papyrussamlung at the Staatliche Museen zu Berlin, Columbia University, the University of Michigan, Leiden University, the Österreichische Nationalbibliothek, University of California, Berkeley and the Istituto Papirologico "G. Vitelli" connected to the University of Florence.

Founders of papyrology were the Viennese orientalist Joseph von Karabacek (Arabic papyrology), Wilhelm Schubart (Greek papyrology), the Austrian antiquarian Theodor Graf who acquired more than 100,000 Greek, Arabic, Coptic and Persian papyri in Egypt, which were bought by the Austrian Archduke Rainer to form the Rainer collection, G. F. Tsereteli, who published papyri of Russian and Georgian collections, Frederic George Kenyon, Otto Rubensohn, Ulrich Wilcken, Bernard Pyne Grenfell, Arthur Surridge Hunt and other distinguished scientists.

== See also ==
- Elephantine papyri and ostraca
- EpiDoc
- Epigraphy
- Greek Magical Papyri
- Leiden Conventions
- Magdalen papyrus
- Nag Hammadi library
- Oxyrhynchus Papyri
- Palaeography
- Rylands Papyri
- University of Michigan Papyrology Collection
- Writing system
- Trismegistos
