= Headlam (surname) =

Headlam is a surname. Notable people with the surname include:

- Arthur Headlam (1862–1947), English Anglican bishop
- Cecil Headlam (1872–1934), English cricketer and writer
- Cuthbert Headlam (1876–1964), British politician
- Edward Headlam (1873–1943), Royal Indian Marine officer
- Eustace Headlam (1892–1958), Australian cricketer
- Felix Headlam (1897–1965), Australian cricketer
- Frank Headlam (1914–1976), Royal Australian Air Force officer
- James Wycliffe Headlam (1863–1929), British historian
- John Headlam (1769–1854), English Anglican priest
- Stewart Headlam (1847–1924), English Anglican priest
- Thomas Emerson Headlam (1813–1875), English barrister and politician
- Walter Headlam (1866–1908), English poet and classical scholar
- Wayne Headlam (born 1948), Australian rules footballer

== See also ==
- Headlam, Co. Durham, England
