= List of Coptic New Testament manuscripts =

Oldest handwritten copies of the New Testament in Coptic

Coptic-language manuscripts of the New Testament include some of the earliest and most important witnesses for textual criticism of the New Testament. Almost 1000 Coptic manuscripts of the New Testament have survived into the 21st century. The majority of them represent Sahidic and Bohairic dialects; only very few manuscripts represent the dialects of Middle Egypt.

== Sahidic manuscripts ==
- The Crosby-Schøyen Codex, Book of Jonah and 1 Peter; the 3rd or 4th centuries; University of Mississippi
- British Library MS. Oriental 7594, Deuteronomy, Jonah, and Acts; the 3rd/4th century
- Michigan MS. Inv 3992, 1 Corinthians, Titus, and the Book of Psalms; 4th century
- Berlin MS. Or. 408, Book of Revelation, 1 John, and Philemon; 4th century
- British Library MS. Oriental 3518 4th century
- Papyrus Bodmer III
- Papyrus Bodmer XIX — Matthew 14:28-28:20; Romans 1:1-2:3; 4th or 5th century.
- Freer Fragment no. 2 — Matthew 1:21ff; 5th century.
- Codex Copticus Tischendorfianus I – fragments of the four Gospels; 9th or 10th century

== Bohairic manuscripts ==
- Papyrus Bodmer III is the oldest manuscript of the Bohairic version
- Huntington MS 17, A, Bohairic-Arabic, dated to 1174, the oldest manuscript with complete text of the four Gospels in Bohairic
- Huntington MS 20, Bohairic-Greek, with complete text of the four Gospels
- Oriental MS 424, Bohairic-Arabic, dated to 1308, with complete text of the Pauline epistles, Catholic epistles, and the Acts
- Oriental MS 425, H_{2}, Bohairic-Arabic
- Oriental MS 426, Bohairic-Arabic
- Oriental MS 1001, E^{2}, Bohairic-Greek, 12th century, British Library
- Oriental MS 1315, E^{1}, Bohairic-Arabic, 1208, British Library
- Oriental MS 1316, H_{3}, Bohairic-Arabic, 1663, British Library
- Oriental MS 1317, Bohairic-Arabic, 1814, British Library
- Oriental MS 3381, 13th century, British Library
- Add MS 5995, D_{4}, Bohairic-Arabic, 14th century, British Library
- Add MS 14470, Bohairic-Arabic, 15th century, British Library
- Codex Marshall Or. 5 - Bohairic-Greek, 14th century, Bodleian Library
- Codex Marshall Or. 6 - Bohairic-Greek, 1320, Bodleian Library
- Codex Marshall Or. 99 - 16th century, Bodleian Library

== Other dialects ==
- Papyrus Michigan 3520 and (6868a), 4-5 century, dialect fayyumic, 1 John, 2 Petrus
- Papyrus Bodmer XLII — 2 Corinthians 10:15-11:12; Sahidic
- Codex Glazier

== See also ==
- Bible translations into Coptic
- Biblical manuscript
- List of Syriac New Testament manuscripts
