= Oriental MS 426 =

Oriental MS 426, bilinguical Bohairic-Arabic, uncial manuscript of the New Testament, on paper, now in the British Library in London. It is dated to the 13th century. The manuscript is lacunose.

Horner designated it by siglum T.

== Description ==
It contains the text of the Gospel of John (lacks 1:1-13), in quarto, 147 paper leaves (24.3 x 16.5). After John follow some extracts from the New Testament (Ephesians 4:1-13; Matthew 16:13-19; Luke 19:1-10), with other matter. The text is written in two columns per page, 33 lines per page.

There is no a division according the Ammonian Sections and the Eusebian Canons.

The nomina sacra are written in an abbreviated way.

It lacks text of John 5:3.4 and the Pericope Adulterae (John 7:53-8:11).

== History ==
The manuscript was purchased by Archdeacon Henry Tattam's sale, in 1868. Lightfoot examined only John 5 in the codex, Arthur Headlam examined a few places.

Horner examined part of the manuscript with text of John. He collated its text twice, in 1890-1895 and used it in his edition of the Bohairic New Testament as a basis for the text of the Gospels.

== See also ==
- List of the Coptic New Testament manuscripts
- Coptic versions of the Bible
- Biblical manuscript
- Codex Marshall Or. 99
- Oriental MS 1001
