= Oriental MS 1316 =

Oriental MS 1001, Bohairic-Arabic, uncial manuscript of the New Testament, on paper. It is dated to the year 1663. Horner designated the manuscript by siglum H_{3}.

== Description ==
It contains a complete text of the four Gospels on 253 paper leaves (30 by 21 cm), in octavo. The text is written in two columns per page, 36 lines per page.

It contains the Eusebian tables, Prolegomena, tables of the κεφαλαια before each Gospel, and pictures; it is illuminated. the Ammonian sections and a references to the Eusebian Canons in red.

The nomina sacra are written in an abbreviated way.

== History ==
It is dated by a colophon to the year 1663.

In 1721 it was presented to the Church of Our Lady and Saint George in Harat ar-Rum. Lightfoot, Arthur Headlam examined the manuscript.

Currently it is housed at the British Library (Oriental MS 1316) in London.

== See also ==
- List of the Coptic New Testament manuscripts
- Coptic versions of the Bible
- Biblical manuscript
- Additional MS 14470
- Oriental MS 425
