= Oriental MS 1001 =

Oriental MS 1001, Bohairic, uncial manuscript of the New Testament, on paper. Palaeographically it has been assigned to the 12th century. Several leaves of the codex were lost. Horner designated the manuscript by siglum E_{2}.

== Description ==
It contains a complete text of the four Gospels on 270 paper leaves (24.7 by 16.3 cm), in octavo. It has two lacunae (Matthew 1:1-4:24: John 16:33–17:14). Six leaves at the beginning were supplied by a later hand. The text is written in two columns per page, 32 lines per page.

It contains Prolegomena, tables of the κεφαλαια before each Gospel, numbers of the κεφαλαια (chapters) are given at the margin in Coptic and Greek, the Ammonian Sections (cursive), a references to the Eusebian Canons (cursive and red), geometric figures before Mark and John, and archaic letters before Mark, Luke, and John. No pictures.

The nomina sacra are written in an abbreviated way.

It contains texts of Like 23:34 and the John 7:53-8:11, but lacks text of Luke 22:43-44 and John 5:3.4.

There is an insertion on folio 123:

"And the number of the great chapters according to what is established in the writings of the orthodox is 84 Greek chapters, Coptic 97 lessons, and small 342, in common 270, peculiar 72, and the number of his words 3000. And these are the great Greek chapters."

== History ==
On folio 77b it contains note written by Athanasius, Bishop of Apotheke or Abutij, A.D. 1792, states that the original date of the manuscript was Mart 1192. This date is also repeated fol. 264b.

The manuscript was bought on 21 May 1869 of N. Nassif for the British Museum. Lightfoot, Arthur Headlam examined a few places.

Horner saw the manuscript in 1892 (Matthew and Mark). He used it in his edition of the Bohairic New Testament as a basis for the text of the Gospels.

Currently it is housed at the British Library (Oriental 1001) in London.

== See also ==
- List of the Coptic New Testament manuscripts
- Coptic versions of the Bible
- Biblical manuscript
- Codex Marshall Or. 99
- Oriental MS 425
