= Codex Marshall Or. 5 =

New Testament manuscript

Codex Marshall Or. 5, is a Bohairic-Greek, uncial manuscript of the New Testament, on a paper. Palaeographically it has been assigned to the 14th century.

== Description ==
It contains the text of the four Gospels on 265 paper leaves (24.7 by 17.5). The text is written in 1 column per page, 27 lines per page. The titles and initials are illuminated. It contains the Ammonian Sections, the Eusebian Canons, numerals of the κεφαλαια (Coptic and Greek) at the margin, and pictures.

The manuscript contains the additions in Luke 22:43.44 (the agony); 23:17.34; John 5:3.4 (the descent of the angel); Pericope Adulterae (7:53-8:11), but omits Matthew 18:11.

In the catalogue the date of a donation is given as Mart 1498 A.D. The manuscript was examined by Lightfoot and Headlam. Horner used it in his edition of the Bohairic New Testament.

Currently it is housed at the Bodleian Library (Marshall Or. 5) in Oxford.

== See also ==
- Coptic versions of the Bible
- Biblical manuscript
- Huntington MS 17
- Huntington MS 20
- Codex Marshall Or. 6
