= British Library, Add MS 5995 =

Add MS 5995, bilingual Bohairic-Arabic, uncial manuscript of the New Testament, on paper. It is dated to the fourteenth century. The manuscript has complex contents.

George Horner designated it as D_{4}.

== Description ==
It contains the text of the four Gospels), 233 paper leaves (39.8 x 26.4). The few first leaves of Matthew and the last leaf of John, and some others in the middle of the codex, were supplied by a later hand. The text is written in two columns per page, 31-33 lines per page. Coptic chapters are written in uncials while the Ammonian Sections and Eusebian Canons are in black cursive letters.

It lacks texts of Luke 22:43-44; 23:17; and the Pericope Adulterae (John 7:53-8:11); but contains texts of Luke 23:34, and John 5:3.4.

== History ==
The Arabic colophon (folio 233 verso) states that the book was repaired in 1776 by one Ibrahim, son of Simeon, but that the original date was more than four hundred years earlier. The same colophon says that it was written for the convent of Baramus in the desert of Scete.

The manuscript was brought from Egypt by Major-General Turner in 1801. J. B. Lightfoot and Arthur Headlam examined a few places.

Horner collated the Gospel of Matthew in 1890. He used it in his edition of the Bohairic New Testament as a basis for the text of the Gospels.

Currently it is housed at the British Library as number 5995 in the Additional manuscripts collection.

== See also ==
- List of the Coptic New Testament manuscripts
- Coptic versions of the Bible
- Biblical manuscript
- Oriental MS 1001
