= Oriental MS 424 =

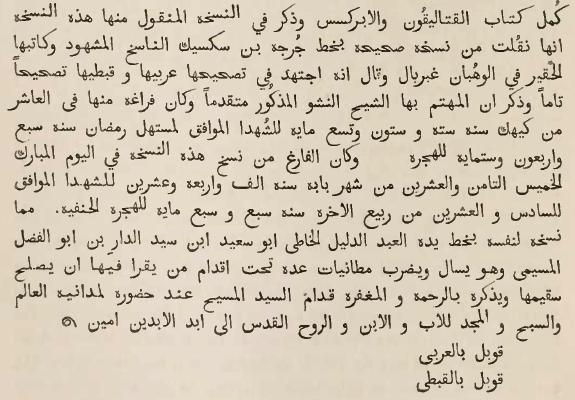
Arabic note on the page 217 (in Horner's transcript), with quoted colophons of the ancestor manuscripts

Codex Oriental Ms. 424, designated by siglum A^{1} (Horner), t (de Lagarde [= Boetticher]), is written in two languages Bohairic-Arabic, uncial manuscript of the New Testament, on paper. It is dated by a colophon to the year 1308. Many leaves of the codex were lost.

== Description ==
It contains the text of the Pauline epistles, Catholic epistles, and Acts of the Apostles in quarto, on 217 paper leaves (size 25.1 by 17.8 cm). The volume is bound in two parts (Romans–Colossians, 1 Thessalonians–Acts), much of the text being lost. The nomina sacra are written in an abbreviated way.

At the end of the Pauline epistles, and at the end of the Acts (see image), are two important Arabic colophons, in which the pedigree of the manuscript is given. From these we learn that both portions of this manuscript were written A. Mart. 1024, i.e. A.D. 1308, by Abu Said ben Said al Dar ibn Abu al Fadl, the Christian. They were copied, however, from a previous manuscript in the handwriting of the patriarch Abba Gabriel and bearing the date A. Mart. 966, i.e. A.D 1250. This manuscript of Abba Gabriel again was copied from two earlier manuscripts, that of the Pauline epistles in the handwriting of Abba Yuhanna, bishop of Sammanud, that of the Catholic epistles and Acts in the handwriting of "Jurja ibn Saksik the famous scribe" (or Zagazig).

The corrections were made in red ink. Boetticher designated corrections by siglum t*.

== History ==
The manuscript belonged to Archdeacon Henry Tattam, and was purchased for the British Museum at the sale of his books. It was designated "tattamianus", by Boetticher. Horner used the manuscript in his edition of the Bohairic New Testament as a basis for the text of the Epistles and Acts.

The manuscript was examined by Bp Lightfoot and Arthur Headlam.

Currently it is housed at the British Library in London and assigned shelfmark Oriental 424.

== See also ==
- List of the Coptic New Testament manuscripts
- Coptic versions of the Bible
- Biblical manuscript
- Huntington MS 20
- Codex Marshall Or. 99
