= Huntington MS 17 =

New Testament manuscript, dated 1174

Huntington 17 is a bilingual Bohairic-Arabic, uncial manuscript of the New Testament, on a paper. It is dated by a colophon to the year 1174. It is the oldest manuscript with complete text of the four Gospels in Bohairic.

== Description ==
It contains the text of the four Gospels on 457 paper leaves (25.3 by 17.5 cm). The text is written in two columns per page, 20 lines per page. It contains a great number of marginal additions inserted by a later hand. Among these marginal additions it has the doxology in Matthew 6:13, in Luke 1:28 phrase ευλογημενε συ εν γυναιξιν are written in smaller hand; Luke 22:43–44 (the agony); 23:17; 23:34; Pericope Adultera (John 7:53-8:11). On the other hand, the descent of the angel (John 5:3.4), which is wanting in many Bohairic manuscripts, stands in the text here.

The text is not divided according to the Ammonian Sections. It contains portraits of the Evangelists before each Gospel. It has some itacistic errors. It has some notes at the margin from later hand. According to Gregory its text is very good.

It contains two endings of the Gospel of Mark.

== History ==
The manuscript was written by Joannes, a monk and scribe, in 1174. The manuscript was brought by Wilkins in 1683 from Egypt. It was examined by J B Lightfoot and Headlam (1889).

Horner used it in his edition of the Bohairic New Testament as a basis for the text of the Gospels.

Currently it is housed at the Bodleian Library (Huntington 17) in Oxford.

== See also ==
- Coptic versions of the Bible
- List of the Coptic New Testament manuscripts
- Biblical manuscript
- Huntington MS 20
- Codex Marshall Or. 6
- Oriental MS 424
