= Whorlton =

Whorlton may refer to:

- Whorlton, County Durham, a village in County Durham, in England
- Whorlton, North Yorkshire, a hamlet and civil parish in the Hambleton District of North Yorkshire, England
