= Oriental MS 425 =

Oriental MS 425, is a bilinguical Bohairic-Arabic, uncial manuscript of the New Testament, on paper, now in the British Library in London. It is dated by a colophon to the year 1308. The manuscript is lacunose.

== Description ==
It contains the text of the four Gospels on 164 paper leaves (25.4 by 18.5 cm) with a large lacunae (Luke, John 1:1-19:6; 20:13-21:13). The text is written in two columns per page, 33 lines per page. It contains the Eusebian tables, tables of the κεφαλαια, numerals of the κεφαλαια are given in Coptic and Greek, the Ammonian Sections, a references to the Eusebian Canons, and pictures.

It lacks text of Matthew 18:11.

== History ==
The manuscript was written by Joannes, a scribe.

The manuscript was purchased by Archdeacon Henry Tattam's sale. The manuscript was examined by Lightfoot and Arthur Headlam.

Horner saw the manuscript in 1892. He used it in his edition of the Bohairic New Testament as a basis for the text of the Gospels.

== See also ==
- List of the Coptic New Testament manuscripts
- Coptic versions of the Bible
- Biblical manuscript
- Codex Marshall Or. 99
- Oriental MS 426
