= British Library, Add MS 14470 =

Add MS 14470 is a Bohairic, uncial manuscript of the New Testament, with a few Armenian fragments. The manuscript is written on vellum and paper. Palaeographically it has been assigned to the 5th or 6th century. The manuscript has survived in a fragmentary condition. It is now in the British Library as Add MS 14470, under the title "PART Of the Gospel of St. John, the Epistles of St. Paul, and the Acts of the Apostles, Peshito version; imperfect". It forms part of the series Add MSS 14425-14741, described in the British Library catalogue as "Manuscripts obtained from the Syrian Monastery of St. Mary Deipara, in the Desert of Nitria, or Scete".

== Description ==
The following fragments of the Bohairic New Testament on vellum are important on account of their antiquity:

Luke 8:2-7.8-10.13-18
2 Corinthians 4:2-5:4
Ephesians 2:10-19; 2:21-3:11
1 Thessalonians 3:3-6; 3:11-4:1

The fragment from the Ephesians is the most ancient among them. The manuscript contains also several paper fragments of the Bohairic New Testament, which belonged chiefly to lectionaries.

== History ==
Lightfoot examined the manuscript.

== See also ==
- List of the Coptic New Testament manuscripts
- Coptic versions of the Bible
- Biblical manuscript
- Oriental MS 1316
