= Codex Tischendorfianus =

Codex Tischendorfianus refers to codices that were discovered by Constantin von Tischendorf, and may refer to a variety of documents:

- Codex Tischendorfianus I (0106 on the list Gregory-Aland) — fragments of the Gospel of Matthew in Greek; 7th century;
- Codex Tischendorfianus II (081 on the list Gregory-Aland) — fragments of the 2. Corinthians in Greek; 6th century;
- Codex Tischendorfianus III (039 on the list Gregory-Aland) — fragments of the Gospels of Luke and John in Greek; 9th century;
- Codex Tischendorfianus IV (036 on the list Gregory-Aland) — the four Gospels in Greek; 10th century;
- Codex Tischendorfianus V (lectionary 293 on the list Gregory–Aland) — 8th century; palimpsest (12th century)
- Codex Tischendorfianus XII — the bilinguical codex of the four Gospels in Syriac-Arabic languages.
- Codex Copticus Tischendorfianus I – Coptic manuscript of the four Gospels; 10th or 11th century
