= Battarus =

Character in ancient Roman poem

Battarus is a name which repeatedly occurs in the 1st-century CE ancient Roman poem "Dirae" (Latin for "imprecations"), once believed to have been written by the poet Virgil, the meaning of which is enigmatic, and has had scholars divided for ages.

His name appears in the poem almost exclusively in the vocative case, indicating that the poem is being addressed to Battarus, though his relationship to the speaker is never clarified, making it difficult to ascertain much about him. It may be that his identity was clarified in a related poem that is now lost.

It is similar to the Greek word for "stutter" and therefore is thought related to the Latin name Battus, or to the epithet "Batalus", which was used to ridicule the 4th-century BCE orator Demosthenes for his speech impediment. There was a character named "Battarus" in "Mime II", written by 4th-century BCE poet Herodas, who was a procurer defending himself in court, thought to be a reference to the stuttering orator.

Earlier scholars have thought it to be the name of some locality, a tree, a river, a grove, or a hill; while others, starting in the 19th century, have considered it to be the name of a person. But those who entertain this latter opinion are again divided in regard to the person that may be meant. Some believe Battarus to be the name of the person who had taken possession by force of the estates, the loss of which the author of the "Dirae" laments, and against whom, therefore, the imprecations are directed.

Latin literature scholar Johann Christian Wernsdorf believed that it was only a fictitious name, and is meant to designate some satiric poet, perhaps Callimachus; others imagine that Battarus is merely a dialectic form for Bassareus, an epithet of the god Bacchus. The 19th-century Italian philologist Pietro Canal identified Battarus with Echo.

Classical philologist August Ferdinand Naeke conceived that Battarus was the name of a slave who was a skillful flute-player, or perhaps a shepherd, and who had formerly lived with the author of the "Dirae" on his estate, and remained there after the poet had been driven from it.

More modern scholars have concluded that Battarus, who silently accompanies the speaker on a tour of his former estate which he is cursing, is not human. Late 19th / early 20th century scholar Robinson Ellis -- taking the etymology of the name to be more related to "bleating" than "stuttering" -- supposed Battarus to have been a pet goat.
