= Dirae (poem) =

Pastoral poem from the Appendix Vergiliana

The poem Dirae is one of the poems that make up the Appendix Vergiliana. It is a pastoral poem, told from the perspective of a Sicilian herdsman forced to give up his land to Lycurgus, who is receiving this land as a reward for his participation in the Roman civil wars. The herdsman spends the entire poem cursing the land so Lycurgus cannot benefit from it.

The scholarly history of the Appendix Vergiliana and therefore of Dirae has been one of authenticating the poems as works of Vergil. Modern consensus is that they are not by Vergil, and the focus has shifted to situating the poem in time and literary context.

== Synopsis ==
Dirae is a series of curses. It is told from the perspective of a Sicilian herdsman, who is evicted from his lands by Lycurgus, a veteran of Rome's civil wars. The herdsman directs the poem toward an enigmatic "Battarus" -- the identity of which is uncertain -- to join him in his cursing of the land that they leave behind, swearing that the natural order of the world would be overturned—that prey should chase after predator—sooner than he stops his baleful song.

The series of curses follow a narrative. The unnamed singer asks the land to become infertile, even the hills bereft of water, so that Lycurgus is not able to experience the beauty of Sicily. Then, the breezes that used to blow sweetly on the land, he asks to turn to unmanageable heat. He mourns the felling of the woods he loves so much, and he asks Jupiter to strike the land with lightning so that first the woods, and then all the farmland, might burn up. Once the land has burned, he turns to the sea, calling on the waves to flood the land and on Neptune to drive sea monsters over the land with the waves. If Neptune does not heed his call, the herdsman asks that at least the streams would flood and, when the streams retreat, that they might leave behind marshes.

In the end, the singer takes a final look from a hill upon his land and vows that, again, the natural order of the world would sooner be overturned—that white would appear to be black and left appear to be right—before he ceases to mourn the loss of his land, disappearing afterwards into the woods.

== Characters ==
The characters of the poem are the singer, the "Battarus" to whom this song is addressed, and Lycurgus who has been given the singer's land. The singer's girlfriend, Lydia, is mentioned twice. In addition to the humans mentioned in the poem, the speaker refers to several well-known entities from Roman mythology and culture.

List of entities
Character	Line number	Reference	Latin unless otherwise cited, quotes come from E. J. Kenney (1966)
Ceres	15	Furrows, bury the worn-out grain of Ceres	effetas Cereris sulci abscondatis avenas
Venus	20	these garlands of Venus, flowering with varied splendour	haec Veneris vario florentia serta decore
Jupiter/Jove	35–36	Jupiter (Jupiter himself has nourished this [forest]), it is proper that these things become ash for you	Iuppiter (ipse Iuppiter hanc aluit), cinis haec tibi fiat oportet
Jupiter/Jove	52	where Vulcan, fed by the fires of Jove encloses the fields	qua Vulcanus agros pastus Iovis ignibus arcet
Boreas	37	then the strength of Thracian Boreas blows forth immense things	Thraecis tum Boreae spirent immania vires
Eurus	38	Eurus bears a cloud mixed by gloomy fog	Eurus agat mixtam furva caligine nubem
Africus	39	Africus threatens a storm with threatening rainclouds	Africus immineat nimbis minitantibus imbrem
Neptune	50–51	Neptune moves into the farmlands on waves and hard sand floods the fields	migret Neptunus in arua fluctibus et spissa campos perfundat harena
Neptune	58–60	Neptune bears these hidden things with his hostile trident, inverting the dark tide all around with the winds of the sea, and draws out the black ashes with frothy waves	haec agat infesto Neptunus caeca tridenti atrum convertens aestum maris undique ventis et fuscum cinerem canis exhauriat undis
Neptune	63	if, these things, Neptune, we pour less into your ears	si minus haec, Neptune, tuas infundimus auris
Vulcan	52	where Vulcan, fed by the fires of Jove encloses the fields	qua Vulcanus agros pastus Iovis ignibus arcet
Syrtis	53	it is called another Srytis, a strange sister of the Libyan one	barbara dicatur Libycae soror altera Syrtis
Discord	83	and you, Discord, always an enemy of your own citizen	tuque inimica tui semper Discordia civis

== Style ==
=== Pastoral ===
Dirae is a pastoral poem, composed of 103 lines of hexameter, arranged into irregular verses divided by a kind of refrain. Given that other extant examples of pastoral are dated around Nero's reign, this poem is possibly the first example of post-Vergilian pastoral poetry, and it is structured in a very similar manner to Vergil's pastorals. Classical pastoral poetry is a form of poetry that is centred around the landscape of the rural herdsman, structured as a song. Other elements of a pastoral poem include a pathetic fallacy motif, in which the landscape responds in some way to the song, and a construction of an idyllic landscape, including both the aspects of the land, such as mountains, forests, and streams, and its inhabitants, such as chirping birds, buzzing bees, and flocks of sheep and goats. While rural activities such as making cheese or ploughing fields are featured in pastoral poems, the true activity of the poem is the singing and piping of the song, generally sung between two participants, perhaps as part of a competition. The traditional location of these songs is Sicily. A particular aspect of Vergilian pastoral is a lack of grounding in a dramatic context.

Dirae complies with these parameters but also manages to subvert them. The singer is a herdsman, and the herdsman is located in Sicily. He explicitly mentions his song in the very first line and does so another ten times, and references to his pipe appear three times in the song (line 7, line 19, and line 97). The exhortations to Battarus to join the song, thus sustaining the curses, function as a kind of refrain.

However, despite naming Battarus several times, Battarus never joins the song, leaving it vague whether he is encouraging of the song, disapproving, or even present at all. There is no exchange of verses. The song does describe a pastoral landscape. There are references to mountains and fields, to forests and streams, recalling particularly a place where the singer and Battarus gathered thorns and listened to chirping crickets (lines 72–74). While pastoral poetry calls forth the pastoral landscape so that the listener might appreciate its enduring sameness, the singer of Dirae describes the ways in which he wants the land to be destroyed. It is the inverse of golden-age imagery: instead of the song shaping a beautiful landscape, it attempts to shape a beautiful landscape into ruin. Dirae can be, for these reasons, considered to be an anti-pastoral poem.

=== Style inspiration ===
The poem takes precedence from Vergil's Eclogues. Eclogues 1 and 9 match Dirae in the sense that they all record the threat of eviction and land seizure to the peaceful eternity of the pastoral landscape. Moeris, in Eclogue 9, curses his land, though in a single line rather than 103. There is a possible link, too, between Dirae and Hellenistic curse-poetry. Eclogue 8 explores the potential for changing the landscape through song. Several characters in the Eclogues are quasi-magical singers, such as Orpheus, Silenus, Hesiod, Damon, and Alphesiboeus. Indeed, Orpheus's myths describe him as capable of making the rocks and trees themselves weep. Damon's farewell to his land in the Eclogues matches the farewell of Dirae’s singer. Another link between Dirae and the Eclogues is the repeated mentioning of swans. In Eclogue 8, there is a competition between swans and owls. The poet refers to himself as a goose among swans in and swans sing in order to save Mantua in Eclogue 9. The very first line of Dirae is “Battare, cycneas repetamus carmine voces,” — “Battarus, let us renew our swan-like voices in song.”

The herdsmen of the Eclogues are also farmers, so, though the herdsman of Dirae only mentions his flocks in the last lines of the poem and is principally taken up with the loss of land, he is still a reflection of Vergilian herdsmen.

In the act of separation, Dirae also takes precedence from the Georgics, in which the relationship could also be either destroyed or nourished through song. However, the landscape is not created by song, as in ordinary pastoral poetry, but comes about by itself. Georgics also contains advice on how to care for the land, which is echoed in Dirae, though in an inverse manner—as Dirae is concerned with how to destroy the land.

Ovid’s Ibis, which explores the powerlessness of the speaker, no matter the feeling and forcefulness of the words, matches the ultimate futility of Dirae’s speaker, as he must, in the end, leave his beloved countryside. The Appendix Vergiliana in general has an Ovidian tone. Scholars have also found stylistic similarities between Dirae and poets such as Catullus, Lucretius, and Ennius.

== Analysis ==
=== Vocabulary ===
At 103 lines, Dirae is quite short, so hard statistics are less applicable than for a longer poem, such as the Eclogues, but it is still helpful. Of all the words in Dirae, 16.3% are unknown in the rest of Vergil’s poetry. These words are cyaneus (dark blue, line 40), cycneus (pertaining to swans, line 1), emano (to flow out, line 72), emergo (to come forth, line 57), emigro (to depart from somewhere, line 101), erro (to wander, line 70), gryllus (cricket, line 74), indemnatus (uncondemned, line 84), libellus (little book, lines 26, 34), pertica (pole, line 45), piscor (to fish, line 80), praetor (leader, line 82), repentinus (sudden, line 56), spica (head of grain, line 73), sterilesco (to grow unfruitful, line 9), transvolo (to fly over, line 44), vernus (pertaining to spring, line 21). “Verna,” in line 21, is not always “verna”: in the edition edited by R. Ellis (1907) the word is “lena” (meaning “bawdy”), and in the edition by Armandus Salvatore (1960) it is “avena” (meaning “oaten”).

=== Date ===
The poems of the Appendix Vergiliana were written in the Julio-Claudian era (12–68 BCE); however, scholars have many different ideas as to the date of Dirae. Their arguments have ranged from vocabulary, metre, grammatical construction, historical context, and subjective stylistic differences. Naturally these arguments have also been used to determine Vergilian authorship: if the date of the poem was definitively established to a date after Vergil's death, it could not have been written by Vergil.

8.15% of the vocabulary is unusual for Vergil—which is to say, the vocabulary is not found in Vergil's Aeneid, Eclogues, or Georgics—but is found in Ovid's poetry. Thus, H. Fairclough has pushed the poem to the time of Ovid instead.

Professor Tenney Frank believed the poem to be from 41 BCE, as it mimics the “bitterness” that can be found in Eclogue 1.

W. R. Hardie wrote an article dissecting the metre of various Augustan poems, including Dirae, and concluded that the poem was written in either 42 or 41 BCE. He admits that Dirae is rather short, but nevertheless analyses it for different types of metrical lines. He believes, based on his analysis of the vital caesura in Vergilian poetry, that Vergil developed poetry towards varied cadence (more varied than Catullus), thus trochaic caesuras are found in greater frequency in Homeric poetry and less so in poetry of the Julio-Claudian period. Participle endings occur less and less in later periods, and the examples of poetry around Vergil's time generally do not place the participial phrases that they do have after the main verb of the sentence—likewise, Vergil prefers to have his participial phrases in front of his main verbs.

Dirae has one occurrence of a participle that takes up a full hexameter.

It has no occurrence of a participle at the end of the line or a participle that is preceded by a main verb and takes up a whole line.

20.4% of the lines have a vital caesura occurring hepthemimerally.

3.88% of the lines have a vital caesura occurring trochaically.

20% of the lines have a pure trochee.

7.76% of the lines have a bucolic diaeresis.

17.47% of the lines for which the adjective occurs before the participle and the substantive adjective occurs at the end.

It has no lines in which the substantive adjective occurs before the participle.

=== Possible sequel ===
In 1792, it was proposed that Lydia, an 80 line hexameter poem, is a sequel to Dirae, given that the singer of the latter poem mentions the name “Lydia” twice (line 89 and line 95). The former poem is of a man mourning the loss of his beloved Lydia, who is frolicking in fields he no longer occupies. There are stylistic similarities between the two: they share a similar type of symmetry in that a word occurring three lines away from the beginning of the poem will also occur three lines away from the end of the poem. The words are not always exactly the same: it may be a different form of the same word or simply a word that shares similar sounds. Nor do they always occur precisely the same distance away from the beginning and ending, but the difference between the distances is never more than a line.

=== Comparison of different editions ===
There are numerous words in Dirae that are daggered, meaning that the word is not reasonably readable in the manuscript. Each edition will provide other editor's rendition of the obscured letters. Separate editions of the poem, edited and annotated by different scholars, have daggered different words.

Word	Line number	Meaning	Manuscript	Other possible words	Meaning	Manuscript(s)
Edited and annotated by E. J. Kenney, 1966						
ludimus	26	“we frolic”	Scaliger	lusibus	"in games"	Sillig and Putsch
ludimus	26	“we frolic”	Scaliger	tu nemus	"you, grove"	Scaliger
ludimus	26	“we frolic”	Scaliger	Lydia et	"Lydia and..."	Hensius
tondemus	28	“we reap”	agreement between Munich 305 (1000–1100 CE) and Munich 18059 (1000s CE) Vatican 3252 (800–900 CE)	tundemus	"we will beat"	Trier 1086 (800–900 CE) Paris 7927 (900–1000 CE) Paris 8069 (1000 CE)
tondemus	28	“we reap”	agreement between Munich 305 (1000–1100 CE) and Munich 18059 (1000s CE) Vatican 3252 (800–900 CE)	tondentur (F)	"they are reaped"	Melk cim. 2 (900s CE)
tondemus	28	“we reap”	agreement between Munich 305 (1000–1100 CE) and Munich 18059 (1000s CE) Vatican 3252 (800–900 CE)	tu demum (squiggle)	"you finally"	Manuscript from 1400s CE that does not agree with any other
tondemus	28	“we reap”	agreement between Munich 305 (1000–1100 CE) and Munich 18059 (1000s CE) Vatican 3252 (800–900 CE)	tondebis	"you will reap"	Gronovis, Hensius
dices	41	"you will say"	Manuscript from 1400s CE that does not agree with any other	Dicens	"saying" (nominative singular)	agreement between Munich 305 (1000–1100 CE) and Munich 18059 (1000s CE) agreement between Trier 1086 (800–900 CE), Vatican 3252 (800–900 CE), Paris 8093 (900s CE), Paris 7927 (900–1000 CE), and Paris 8069 (1000s CE) Paris 17177 (900s CE) Melk cim. 2 (900s CE)
crebro	41	"repeatedly" (nominative singular)	agreement between Munich 305 (1000–1100 CE) and Munich 18059 (1000s CE)	Crebo	"I break"	Melk cim. (900s CE) Trier 1086 (800–900 CE)
crebro	41	"repeatedly" (nominative singular)	agreement between Munich 305 (1000–1100 CE) and Munich 18059 (1000s CE)	erebo	"to/for Erebus"	Vatican 3252 (800–900 CE) Paris 8093 (900s CE) Paris 8069 (1000s CE)
crebro	41	"repeatedly" (nominative singular)	agreement between Munich 305 (1000–1100 CE) and Munich 18059 (1000s CE)	erobo	This word is not present in Cassell’s Latin Dictionary or A Latin Dictionary	Paris 7927 (900–1000 CE)
tua [Lydia]	41	"your [Lydia]"	M. Schmidt	Quae	"which"	M. Schmidt
dixti	41	"you have said"	agreement between Trier 1086 (800–900 CE), Vatican 3252 (800–900 CE), Paris 8093 (900s CE), Paris 7927 (900–1000 CE), and Paris 8069 (1000s CE)	Dexti	This word is not present in Cassell’s Latin Dictionary or A Latin Dictionary	Melk cim. 2 (900s CE)
dixti	41	"you have said"	agreement between Trier 1086 (800–900 CE), Vatican 3252 (800–900 CE), Paris 8093 (900s CE), Paris 7927 (900–1000 CE), and Paris 8069 (1000s CE)	dixi	"I have said"	agreement between Munich 305 (1000–1100 CE) and Munich 18059 (1000 CE)
coculet	74	This word is not present in Cassell’s Latin Dictionary or A Latin Dictionary	agreement between Munich 305 (1000–1100 CE) and Munich 18059 (1000s CE) agreement between Trier 1086 (800–900 CE), Vatican 3252 (800–900 CE), Paris 8093 (900s CE), Paris 7927 (900–1000 CE), and Paris 8069 (1000s CE)	occulet	"he/she/it will conceal"	agreement between Munich 305 (1000–1100 CE) and Munich 18059 (1000s CE) agreement between Trier 1086 (800–900 CE), Vatican 3252 (800–900 CE), Paris 8093 (900s CE), Paris 7927 (900–1000 CE), and Paris 8069 (1000s CE)
coculet	74	This word is not present in Cassell’s Latin Dictionary or A Latin Dictionary	agreement between Munich 305 (1000–1100 CE) and Munich 18059 (1000s CE) agreement between Trier 1086 (800–900 CE), Vatican 3252 (800–900 CE), Paris 8093 (900s CE), Paris 7927 (900–1000 CE), and Paris 8069 (1000s CE)	cogulet	This word is not present in Cassell’s Latin Dictionary or A Latin Dictionary	Paris 8069 (1000s CE)
coculet	74	This word is not present in Cassell’s Latin Dictionary or A Latin Dictionary	agreement between Munich 305 (1000–1100 CE) and Munich 18059 (1000s CE) agreement between Trier 1086 (800–900 CE), Vatican 3252 (800–900 CE), Paris 8093 (900s CE), Paris 7927 (900–1000 CE), and Paris 8069 (1000s CE)	occultet	"he/she/it might conceal"	Paris 17177 (900s CE)
coculet	74	This word is not present in Cassell’s Latin Dictionary or A Latin Dictionary	agreement between Munich 305 (1000–1100 CE) and Munich 18059 (1000s CE) agreement between Trier 1086 (800–900 CE), Vatican 3252 (800–900 CE), Paris 8093 (900s CE), Paris 7927 (900–1000 CE), and Paris 8069 (1000s CE)	occupet	"he/she/it seize"	Manuscript from 1400s CE that does not agree with any other
coculet	74	This word is not present in Cassell’s Latin Dictionary or A Latin Dictionary	agreement between Munich 305 (1000–1100 CE) and Munich 18059 (1000s CE) agreement between Trier 1086 (800–900 CE), Vatican 3252 (800–900 CE), Paris 8093 (900s CE), Paris 7927 (900–1000 CE), and Paris 8069 (1000s CE)	occubet	"he/she/it might fall down"	Naeke
Edited and annotated by R. Ellis, 1907						
revocasset	54	"he/she/it had withdrawn"	Munich 18059 (900s CE) Vatican 3252 (800s CE) Bodl. Auct. F. I. 17 (1300s CE)	revocasti	"you have withdrawn"	Naeke
revocasset	54	"he/she/it had withdrawn"	Munich 18059 (900s CE) Vatican 3252 (800s CE) Bodl. Auct. F. I. 17 (1300s CE)	puocasti	This word is not present in Cassell’s Latin Dictionary	Vatican 3269 (1400s CE)
revocasset	54	"he/she/it had withdrawn"	Munich 18059 (900s CE) Vatican 3252 (800s CE) Bodl. Auct. F. I. 17 (1300s CE)	meminere vocasset	"they remember to have called you"	Fragment, Paris 17177 (1000s CE), lines 46–103
revocasset	54	"he/she/it had withdrawn"	Munich 18059 (900s CE) Vatican 3252 (800s CE) Bodl. Auct. F. I. 17 (1300s CE)	revocasses	"you had recalled"	Harl. 3963 (1400s CE)

There are several lines in Dirae that differ from edition to edition. This table compares three different editions of the poem; but this list is not comprehensive. Words that differ are bolded.

Line number	Edited and annotated by R. Ellis, 1907	Edited and Annotated by E. J. Kenney, 1966	Edited and Annotated by Armandus Salvatore, 1960
7	**muta** prius **fiet**, quam non mea libera avena	**multa** prius **fient** quam non mea libera avena	**multa** prius **fient** quam non mea libera avena
8–9	montibus et silvis dicam tua facta, **Lycurge, impia. Trinacriae** sterilescant gaudia vobis	montibus et silvis dicam tua facta, **Lycurge. impia Trinacriae** sterilescant gaudia vobis	montibus et silvis dicam tua facta, **Lycurge. 'impia Trinacriae** sterilescant gaudia vobis
10	nec fecunda **seni**, nostris felicia rura	nec fecunda, **senis** nostris felicia rura	nec fecunda, **senis** nostri felicia rura
15	effetas Cereris **sulci abscondatis** avenas	effetas Cereris **sulcis condatis** avenas	effetas Cereris **sulcis condatis** avenas
21	purpureo campos quae **pingit lena** colore	purpureo campos quae **pingunt verna** colore	purpureo campos quae **pingit avena** colore
26	**lusibus** et **nostris multum** cantata libellis	**ludimus** et **multum nostris** cantata libellis	'**ludimus** et, **multum nostris** catata libellis
28	**tonderis** **viridis** umbras, nec laeta comantis	**tondemus** **virides** umbras, nec laeta comantis	**tondemus** **virides** umbras: nec laeta comantis
38	Eurus agat mixtam **fulva** caligine nubem	Eurus agat mixtam **furva** caligine nubem	Eurus agat mixtam **fulva** caligine nubem
40	cum **tua** cyaneo resplendens aethere silva	cum **tu**, cyaneo resplendens aethere, silva	cum '**tua**' cyaneo resplendens aethere, silva
41	non iterum **discet** nec **ero** 'tua', Lydia, **dici**	non iterum **dices** **crebro** tua lydia **dixti**	non iterum **dices**, **crebro** 'tua Lydia' **dixti**
42	**vicinae** flammae rapiant ex ordine vitis	**vicinas** flammae rapiant ex ordine vitis	**vicinae** flammae rapiant ex ordine vitis
54	Tristius hoc, memini, **revocasset**, Battare, carmen	tristius hoc, memini, **revocasti**, Battare, carmen	tristius hoc, memini, **revocasset**, Battare, carmen
63	si minus haec, Neptune, **tuas** infundimus auris	si minus haec, Neptune, **tuas** infundimus auris	si minus haec, Neptune, **tuis** infundimus auris
66	nil est quod perdam ulterius: **meret** omnia Ditis	nil est quod perdam ulterius: **merita** omnia ditis	nil est quod perdam ulterius: **merita** omnia Ditis
67	flectite currentis **nymphas** vaga flumina retro	flectite currentis **lymphas**, vaga flumina, retro	'flectite currentis **nymphas**, vaga flumina, retro
70	nec nostros **servire** sinant **erronibus** agros	nec nostros **servire** sinant **erronibus** agros	nec nostros **exire** sinant **erroribus** agros
74	**cogulet** arguti grilli cava garrula rana	**coculet** arguti grylli cava garrula rana	**cogulet** arguti grylli cava garrula rana
79	**unde** elapsa meos agros pervenerit unda	**cum** delapsa meos agros pervenerit unda	**unde** elapsa meos agros pervenerit unda
83	tuque inimica **pii** semper discordia civis	tuque inimica **tui** semper Discordia civis	tuque inimica **tui** semper Discordia civis
94	intueor **campos longum: manet** esse sine illis	intueor **campos: longum manet** esse sine illis	intueor **campos longum: manet** esse sine illis
98	dulcia amara prius **fient** et mollia dura	dulcia amara prius **fient** et mollia dura	'dulcia amara prius **fiant** et mollia dura

== Authenticity ==
Dirae is one of the poems that make up the Appendix Vergiliana.The term “Appendix,” refers to works that are considered solely within the background of authentic texts (i.e. works that are authentically attributed to Vergil), and are of interest because of the question of their authenticity. This is contrasted against the term “opuscula” (meaning “little works”), for which the main question is of significance. Thus, the vast majority of scholarly work around the Appendix is concerned with the authenticity of the poems.

None of these poems are mentioned by Vergil's literary editors, L. Varius or Plotius Tucca, nor are they mentioned in Valerius Probus’s Vita of Vergil written in the first century CE. The first attribution of Dirae to Vergil occurred in Aelius Donatus’s biography of Vergil in the 4th century CE, in which Donatus claimed that Vergil wrote the poems Catalepton, Priapea, Epigrammata, Dirae, Ciris, and Culex when he was 26. Servius’s biography, also of the fourth century, adds Copa to Donatus's list.

There is a catalogue from the ninth century CE, found in Murbach, listing several poems from the Appendix—and among them, Dirae—but the manuscript itself is lost. In general, manuscripts that include poems from the Appendix only have a few.

Doubts regarding the authenticity of at least some of the poems occur as early as the sixteenth century CE. Jodocus Badius Ascensius, in 1501 CE, asserts that Priapea must be Ovidian on account of obscenity and that In Maecenatem is also not by Vergil, and mentions that there are doubts as to the authenticity of Aetna as well.

The first recorded doubt regarding the authenticity of Dirae specifically is in Josephus Justus Scaliger’s work, Appendix Vergiliana. Scaliger was the first to name this collection of poems in such a manner, and the first to have formally decided the poems that constitute the Appendix. In it, he attributes Dirae to Valerius Cato. He only considers three of the poems to be genuinely Vergilian: Catalepton, Ciris, Culex. By the seventeenth century, all poems were attributed away from Vergil, though in the early twentieth, scholars began to reconsider the possibility.

Scaliger's assumption that Dirae was written by Cato is based on an event recorded by Suetonius. Under the reforms of Sulla, Cato lost his land. In indignation, Cato wrote a little book, a libellus, in which he complained about his eviction. Scaliger connected the authorship of Cato's book and Dirae based on the spirit of complaint and lament found in both works.

Modern consensus is that the poems of the Appendix are not written by Vergil, but the focus has switched from the possible authenticity of the poems to engagement with the poems themselves. Scholars are attempting to receive the poems the way they would have been in their original context. Given that comparatively few Latin poems from the first century BCE survive, it is impossible to say whether these poems were deliberately faked or simply representative of their genre and time. Scholastic tendency is towards assigning extant poems to known poets: it is tempting to flesh out the character and life of historical figures. Likewise, scholars have tended towards proving or disproving the authorship assigned by previous scholars, so the majority of scholastic analysis has been used to support arguments towards dating or authorship. For example, one of the poems of the Appendix, Catalepton, was brushed off as unlikely to be by Vergil because, “the assumption that Virgil could have ever written laudatory verses on such an occasion will need more proof than is here produced before it can be accepted,” a statement that seems to imply a personal knowledge of Vergil's character. However, significantly less time has been used in analysing the poems for their artistic merit—an aspect of the poetry in which the Ancient Romans were far more interested.

It is unlikely that the Romans considered the issue of imitation in the same manner that scholars have approached the Appendix—the manner of sorting the authentic from the inauthentic. Imitation was a big part of Roman culture, extending down even to the school curriculum. Vergil is considered to be among the most important poets of the Roman Republic, so it was fashionable to imitate him, and it is probably due to his name labelling the Appendix that these poems have been preserved until the first recorded scholarly analysis.

The education of Roman boys included paraphrasis, an exercise that asked the students to convert poetry into prose and vice versa, teaching them how to express the same thoughts in several ways. Imitation was also an important part of the education system, schoolboys first analysing and even memorising sections of literary texts before using their knowledge to create new pieces in old styles.

Roleplay, a more comprehensive form of imitation, was the next step. After composing in the style of a particular poet, the students had to also perform in that style. So the poems, written in a style similar to that of Vergil, were not considered by the Romans to be deliberate forgeries, but as imitations to be judged as to how accurate the imitation was.

Additionally, the term used to denote works labelled with an author's name but not truly authored by that person—pseudepigrapha—referred both to works deliberately faked and works that were merely written in the style of said author. Roman book-publishing was not very precise: titles changed over time and authors did not always claim their own work. Books would be assigned authors and titles by the publishers according to their own standards, misattribution thus becoming very easy. The concept of intellectual property was not based on individual contributors, but on the school to which the work belonged—it is in this way that works on medicine were often assigned to Hippocrates and works on mathematics to Pythagoras. The construction of public figures was less concerned with “what actually happened,” but in the creation of anecdotes to fill in the blank spots between the publicly-known events of their life and to form a story suited to their persona. It was not about what was true, but about what was possible. So the attribution of the Appendix to Vergil was not necessarily due to deliberate forgery, but perhaps to denote a specific style or to help form a picture of Vergil as a young man.

Given the context, scholars believe that it is unlikely these poems were deliberately faked.

Another area of scholarly research around the Appendix is how expansive the Appendix should be. Some scholars argue that the couplet on Vergil's tomb should be included in the Appendix, especially because the couplet is too short to be considered in any way but against the context of Vergil's other works.

== Commentary ==
There are no known commentaries on the Appendix Vergiliana from antiquity. Post-antiquity opinions about the Appendix surface around the Renaissance. Jodocus Badius Ascensius wrote the first known commentary in 1500 CE. Badius believed that these works were written by a young Vergil, based on the Vita written by Donatus, but it is unlikely that he read the poems himself. He used these poems as a way to teach morality to children, and for that reason, published Silvae Morales, which is a series of five moral poems taken from the works of Vergil. In the Renaissance, the general conception of Vergil as a moral poet was used to judge whether certain poems could be written by him or not. For example, Priapea and Catalepton were disqualified due to their obscenity. This, however, may be due to the fact that poetry in the sixteenth century was classified under moral philosophy.

By the middle of the sixteenth century, commentary shifted away from moral application and towards style, craft, and literary development. Julius Caesar Scaliger considered Vergil's poetry—and by extension, the Appendix—to be the standard from which budding poets take their inspiration. He valued the authority, clarity, and logic of Vergil's work, and taught that Vergil's method of working (or what he perceived to be Vergil's method, based on Donatus's biography), which entailed writing in the morning and severely editing in the afternoon, to be an example of iudicium (judgement), in which anything that could be considered less than beautiful is removed.

Julius Caesar Scaliger did attribute Dirae to Vergil, but as he also believed the poems of the Appendix Vergiliana were written by a young Vergil, he does not take them as perfect models. Pastoral poetry in particular required time to develop, as it was among the first genres that Vergil wrote. He considers Dirae to be the first draft of Damon in Eclogue 8.

His son, Josephus Justus Scaliger, was the first scholar to call the collection of poems an Appendix (previously, these poems were known as Opuscula or as Iuvenalia). In this collection, he deems only Culex, Catalepton, and Ciris genuine Vergilian poems and considers them to in fact be mature works.

A. E. Housman is known to have called the authors of the poems of the Appendix “mediocre poets and worse; and the gods and men and booksellers whom they affronted by existing allotted them for transcription to worse than mediocre scribes.”
