= Papyrus Bodmer III =

Coptic Biblical Manuscript

Codex Bodmer III, is a Coptic uncial manuscript of the fourth Gospel, and the first four chapters of Genesis, dated palaeographically to the 4th century. It contains the text of the Gospel of John with some lacunae. It is written in an early Bohairic dialect of Coptic language.

It is the oldest manuscript of the Bohairic version. Originally codex contained 239 pages, but the first 22 are damaged and only small fragments have survived. The Gospel of John is followed by the text of Book of Genesis (1:1-4:2) with page numbers beginning with α in a new series.

The first occurrence of "God" in John 1:1 is in contracted form as the Nomina Sacra, whereas the second occurrence is spelled fully. In John 1:18 the word "God" (which no one has seen) is contracted (as the Nomina Sacra), while the word "God" (only-begotten) is spelled out. The scribe may have been a Gnostic.

The text of the codex is a representative of the Alexandrian text-type. Because its text is different from later Bohairic manuscript (from 12th century and later) it was called to be the proto-Bohairic version (Papyrus Bodmer III).

The manuscript was discovered in Upper Egypt and purchased by John M. Bodmer of Geneva.

It was published by Rodolphe Kasser in 1958.

Currently it is housed at the Bibliotheca Bodmeriana (P. Bodmer III) in Cologny.

== See also ==
- List of the Coptic New Testament manuscripts
- Coptic versions of the Bible
- Biblical manuscript
