= Herodas =

Ancient Greek poet

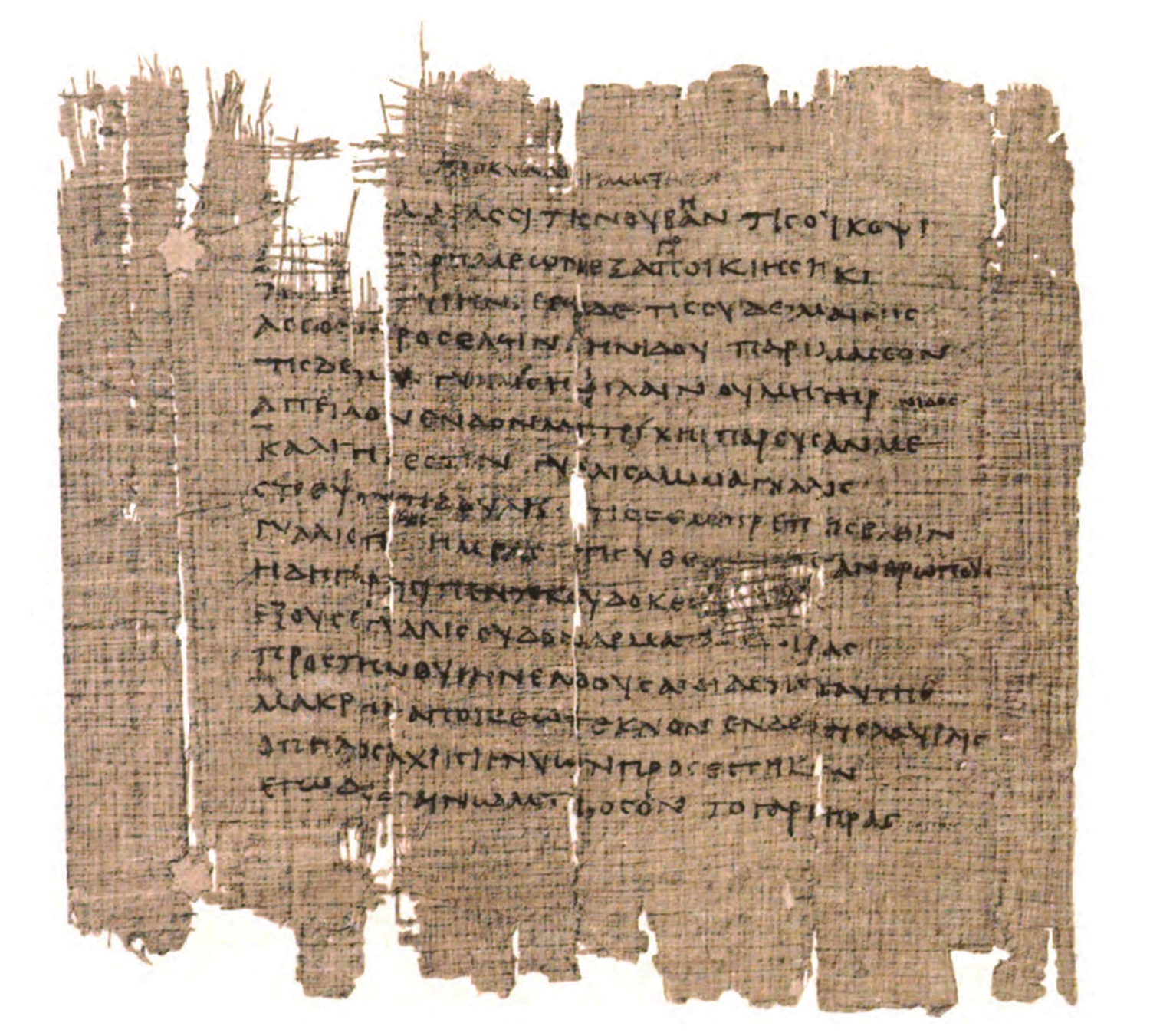
The first column of the Herodas papyrus, showing Mimiamb 1. 1–15.

Herodas, or Herondas (Ancient Greek: Ἡρώδας or Ἡρώνδας – the name is spelt differently in the few places where he is mentioned), was a Greek poet and the author of short humorous dramatic scenes in verse, probably written in Alexandria during the 3rd century BC.

Between the two World Wars the cryptographer Dilly Knox worked on the great commentary on Herodas that had been started by Walter Headlam, damaging his eyesight while studying the British Museum's collection of papyrus fragments, but finally managing to decipher the text of the Herodas papyri. The Knox-Headlam edition of Herodas finally appeared in 1922.

== Originality ==
Apart from the intrinsic merit of these pieces, they are interesting in the history of Greek literature as being a new species, illustrating Alexandrian methods. They are called Mimiamboi (Ancient Greek: μιμίαμβοι, "Mime-iambics"), or mimes. Mimes were the Dorian product of South Italy and Sicily, and the most famous of them – from which Plato is said to have studied the drawing of character – were the work of Sophron.

These were scenes in popular life, written in the language of the people, vigorous with sexual proverbs such as we get in other reflections of that region – in Petronius and the Pentamerone. Two of the best known and the most vital among the Idylls of Theocritus, the 2nd and the 15th, we know to have been derived from mimes of Sophron. What Theocritus is doing there, Herodas, his younger contemporary, is doing in another manner – casting old material into novel form, upon a small scale, under strict conditions of technique. The method is entirely Alexandrian: Sophron had written in a peculiar kind of rhythmical prose; Theocritus uses the hexameter and Doric, Herodas the scazon or "lame" iambic (with a dragging spondee at the end) and the old Ionic dialect with which that metre was associated. That, however, hardly goes beyond the choice and form of words; the structure of the sentences is close-knit Attic. Herodas did not write his mimiambics in the contemporary Greek koine of his period. Rather, he affected a style that imitated the Greek spoken in the 6th century BC.

The metre and language suit the tone of common life that Herodas aims at realizing; for, as Theocritus may be called idealist, Herodas is an unflinching realist. His persons talk in vehement exclamations and emphatic turns of speech, with proverbs and fixed phrases; and occasionally, where it is designed as proper to the part, with the most naked coarseness of expression. The scene of the second and the fourth is laid at Cos, and the speaking characters in each are never more than three.

== Herodas' mimes ==
=== Mime I ===
In Mime I the old nurse, now the professional go-between or bawd, calls on Metriche, whose husband has been long away in Egypt, and endeavours to excite her interest in a most desirable young man, fallen deeply in love with her at first sight. After hearing all the arguments Metriche declines with dignity, but consoles the old woman with a glass of wine.

=== Mime II ===
This is a monologue by a "whoremonger" named Battarus, prosecuting a merchant-trader for breaking into his establishment at night and attempting to carry off one of the inmates, who is produced in court. The whoremonger, remarking that he has no evidence to call, proceeds to a peroration in the regular oratorical style, appealing to the Coan judges not to be unworthy of their traditional glories. The whole oration is a parody of Athenian legal speeches, with the name "Battarus" perhaps being a reference to the derisive epithet "Batalus" sometimes applied to the orator Demosthenes.

=== Mime III ===
Metrotimé, a desperate mother, brings to the schoolmaster Lampriscos her truant son, Cottalos, with whom neither she nor his incapable old father can do anything. She narrates his misdeeds and implores the schoolmaster to flog him. The boy accordingly is hoisted on another's back and flogged; but his spirit does not appear to be subdued, and the mother resorts to the old man after all.

=== Mime IV ===
This is a visit of two poor women with an offering to the temple of Asclepius at Cos. While the cock is being sacrificed, they turn, like the women in the Ion of Euripides, to admire the works of art; among them a small boy strangling a vulpanser – doubtless the work of Boethus of Chalcedon that we know – and a sacrificial procession by Apelles, "the Ephesian", of whom we have an interesting piece of contemporary eulogy. The oily sacristan is admirably painted in a few slight strokes.

=== Mime V ===
The jealous woman accuses one of her slaves, whom she has made her favourite, of infidelity; has him bound and sent degraded through the town to receive 2,000 lashes; no sooner is he out of sight than she recalls him to be branded "at one job". The only pleasing person in the piece is the little maidservant permitted liberties as a verna brought up in the house whose ready tact suggests to her mistress an excuse for postponing execution of a threat made in ungovernable fury.

=== Mime VI ===
Metro visits to Koritto's house to ask her where she acquired a dildo. The maker of the dildo is a certain Kerdon, who also works as a cobbler. On acquiring the information she desired, Metro leaves to seek him out.

=== Mime VII ===
The same Kerdon and Metro whom we see in VI appear, Metro bringing some friends to Kerdon's shoe shop (his name, which means "profiteer", had already become generic for the shoemaker as the typical representative of retail trade); he is a little bald man with a fluent tongue, complaining of hard times, who bluffs and wheedles by turns. The sexual undertones which we have come to expect from his involvement in VI are only realised at the end when Metro's friends have left the shop.

=== Mime VIII ===
Opens with the poet waking up his servants to listen to his dream; but we have only the beginning, and the other fragments are very short. Within the limits of 100 lines or less Herodas presents us with a highly entertaining scene and with characters definitely drawn.

== Discussion ==
There might be a connection to Athenian New Comedy, where the tendency in the 4th century had been gradually to evolve accepted types—not individuals, but generalizations from a class, an art in which Menander's was esteemed the master-hand.

Their effect is achieved by true dramatic means, with touches never wasted and the more delightful often because they do not clamour for attention. The execution has the qualities of first-rate Alexandrian work in miniature, such as the epigrams of Asclepiades possess, the finish and firm outlines; and these little pictures bear the test of all artistic work – they do not lose their freshness with familiarity, and gain in interest as one learns to appreciate their subtle points.

== Sources ==
- The papyrus manuscript, obtained from the Fayum, is in the possession of the British Museum, and was first printed by FG Kenyon in 1891. Editions by Otto Crusius (1905, text only, in Teubner series) and JA Nairn (1904), with introduction, notes and bibliography.
- There is an English verse translation of the mimes by H. Sharpley (1906) under the title A Realist of the Aegean and another by Guy Davenport (1981). A prose translation is included in the Walter George Headlam edition (1922).
- Cunningham, I.C. Herodas, Mimiambi (Oxford, 1971).
- Zanker, Graham (ed., trans., comm.). Herodas: Mimiambs (Oxford: Aris & Phillips, 2009).
