= Oscar Lemm =

Russian Egyptologist (1856–1918)

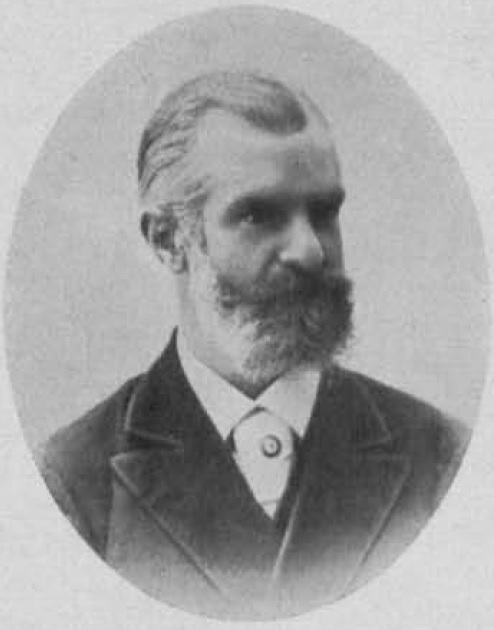
Portrait of Oscar von Lemm (1856–1918)

Oscar Eduardovich Lemm (Russian: Оскар Эдуардович Лемм; 1856–1918) was a Russian Egyptologist and Coptologist who specialized in the study of Coptic writings.

== Life ==
Lemm had studied at the Tsarskoye Selo Lyceum and the University of Leipzig (1877-1882).

Since 1883 he worked as the curator of the Asiatic Museum, the cradle and centre of Coptology in Russia at that time, of the Imperial Academy of Sciences.

In 1883 Lemm, as a Coptologist, gave a speech about Coptic manuscripts housed at the Imperial Library in Petersburg, at the VI International Congress of Orientalists in Leiden.

In 1886 Lemm was invited to teach students elective disciplines on the subject of Egyptology at the University of St. Petersburg. In 1893 he finished his academic work because of lack of students. In 1896 he left university.

In 1890 Lemm published the text of the Codex Copticus Tischendorfianus I, an important work in the area of Coptic literature and textual criticism of the New Testament. He published also Codex Copticus Tischendorfianus III.

In 1899 he published fragments of a legend about Cyprian Antiocheian from a Parisian manuscript (BnF, Cod. Copt. Parisinus 129.15, foll. 1r-10v) and two fragments from the Epistle of Athanasius of Alexandria - the Neapolitan manuscripts (Cod. Borgianus CCXLIX-CCL). In 1900 Lemm published another Coptic manuscript housed in the National Library of France (Cod. Copt. Parisinus 129.18, foll. 141-150), containing a fragment traditionally attributed to Dionysius the Areopagite.

In 1906 he became the corresponding member of the Imperial Academy of Sciences.

Lemm was the first Russian scholar, due to his work in Russian Coptology, to receive worldwide recognition.

== Works ==
- "Studien zum Ritaulbuche des Ammondienstes" (dissertation, Leipzig, 1882);
- "Das Ritualbuch des Ammondienstes" (Leipzig, 1882);
- "Aegypt. Lesestucke" (1882);
- "Коптская легенда о нахождении Гроба Господня" ("Записки Восточного Отделения Императорского Русского Археологического Общества", IV, 1889);
- "Der Alexanderroman bei den Kopten" (Petersburg., 1903);
- "Das Triadon: ein sahidisches Gedicht mit arabischer Übersetzung" (1903);
- "Iberica" ("Записки Императорской Академии Наук", VII, 1906);
- "Koptische Martyreracten" ("Записки Императорской Академии Наук", XII, 1913);
- "Kleine Kopt. Studien";
- "Koptische Miscellen".

== See also ==
- Vladimir Golenishchev

== Sources ==
- "Лемм, Оскар Эдуардович" . Brockhaus and Efron Encyclopedic Dictionary (in Russian). 1906.
