= Codex Copticus Tischendorfianus I =

Codex Copticus Tischendorfianus I is a Coptic uncial manuscript of the four Gospels, dated palaeographically to the 10th or 11th century. Originally it contained the text of the four Gospels. It is written in Sahidic dialect of Coptic language. It is classified on the list of Coptic manuscripts of the New Testament on the position sa 181. The manuscript has survived in a fragmentary condition.

== Description ==
The codex contains 6-7 fragmentary leaves, and seven small fragments. The size of original page was (37 centimetres (15 in) by 27.5 centimetres (10.8 in)). The text is written in two columns per page, in 12-18 lines per page (original in 20 lines per page). The initial letters are written at the margin of column; they are increased simply and are formed about 3 lines or 3-5 lines.

The column block seems as much as possible breaking the words on the banks; punctuation mark are given in the centre of lines, with only small spaces. Diaeresis is used after the usual circumference. The Old Testament quotation in John 1:23 is marked by an obelus at the margin. It is unusual because the quotations usually are marked by inverted comma, obelus is used only for a spurious text.

The text is divided into κεφαλαια (chapters), whose numbers are given at the left margin. The text of Matthew and Luke is divided according to the Greek way, the text of John - according to the Coptic way.

The Nomina Sacra are written in contracted way.

It contains only fragments of the Gospels: Matthew, Luke, and John.

Contents
Matthew 26:65-66; 27:3-6.11-17.23-24.37-40.49-51.57-58;28:1-2.3-5.10-11.13;
Luke 7:16-24.26-33.36-8:3; 24:1-7.11-17.19-25.29-35.39-44.49-53;
John 1:4-10.13-17.20-25.29-33.37-42.45-50.52-2:8.11-15.19-24; 3:2-6.10-15.19-23.27-31.34-4:5.9-13.18-22.25-29.35-38.

The text of the codex is a representative of the Alexandrian text-type.

== History ==
The manuscript was discovered by Constantin von Tischendorf in 1853 in Sinai and was brought by him to Petersburg.

It was examined by George William Horner and Oscar Eduardovich Lemm. Lemm edited text of the codex.

Currently it is housed at the National Library of Russia (K.N.S. 49-50) in Saint Petersburg and in Pushkin Museum (Golishneff Copt. 6) in Moscow.

== See also ==
- List of the Coptic New Testament manuscripts
- Coptic versions of the Bible
- Biblical manuscript
