= John Headlam =

Archdeacon of Richmond (1769–1854)

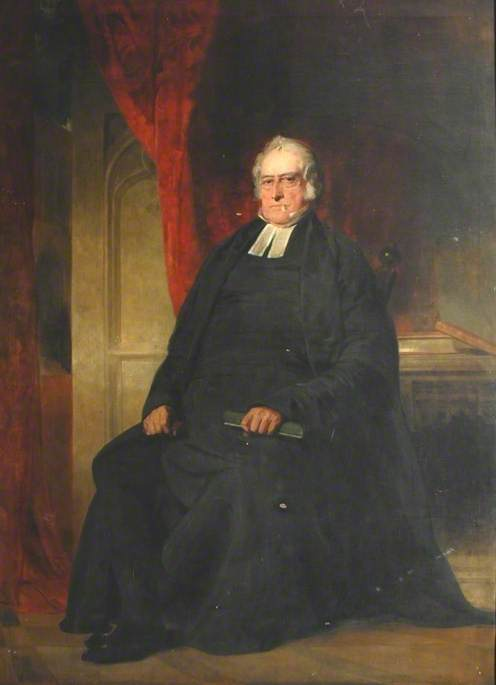
Rev. John Headlam

John Headlam (b Gateshead 1769; d Wycliffe, North Riding 4 May 1854) was Archdeacon of Richmond from 30 December 1826 until his death.

Headlam was educated at Lincoln College, Oxford, matriculating on 1 April 1786 at the age of sixteen, and graduating B.A. in 1790, M.A. in 1792. For many years he was the Rector of Wycliffe, in the North Riding of Yorkshire. He was also Chancellor of Ripon from 1846.

In 1806, Headlam married Maria Wilson-Morley. They had seven sons and five daughters. Their eldest son was Thomas Emerson Headlam. Among their many grandchildren were Arthur Headlam, Cecil Headlam, Cuthbert Headlam, Edward Headlam, James Headlam-Morley and Walter Headlam.

Church of England titles
Preceded by Henry Law	Archdeacon of Richmond; 1826–1854	Succeeded by Charles Dodgson
