= Codex Marshall Or. 6 =

New Testament manuscript

Codex Marshall Or. 6, is a Bohairic-Greek, uncial manuscript of the New Testament, on a paper. It is dated by the Colophon to the year 1320.

== Description ==
It contains the text of the four Gospels on 235 paper leaves (23.8 by 19.5) with lacunae (several leaves at the end, they were supplied by a later hand). The text is written in 1 column per page, 26-27 lines per page. It contains numerals of the κεφαλαια (chapters), in Greek, at the left margin, the Ammonian Sections, (not the Eusebian Canons), and pictures. The Euthalian Apparatus was added in 1641.

The manuscript lacks the additions in Christ's agony at Gethsemane (Luke 22:43.44); 23:17; John 5:3.4 (the descent of the angel); Pericope Adulterae (7:53-8:11).

In the catalogue the date of a donation is given as Mart 1498 A.D. The manuscript was examined by Lightfoot and Headlam. Horner used it in his edition of the Bohairic New Testament.

Currently it is housed at the Bodleian Library (Marshall Or. 6) in Oxford.

== See also ==
- Coptic versions of the Bible
- Biblical manuscript
- Huntington MS 20
- Codex Marshall Or. 99
