= Walter Headlam =

British classical scholar and poet (1866–1908)

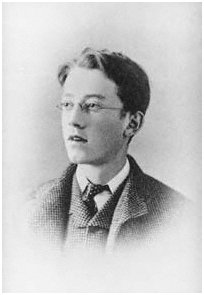
Walter George Headlam in 1884

Walter George Headlam (15 February 1866 – 20 June 1908) was a British classical scholar and poet, perhaps best remembered for his work on the Mimes of Herodas. He was described as "one of the leading Greek scholars of his time."

== Early years ==
Headlam was born at 24 Norfolk Square, Hyde Park, London in 1866, the second son of Edward Headlam (1824–1882), a fellow of St John's College, Cambridge, a barrister and the Director of Examinations in the Civil Service Commission, and his wife, Mary Anne Johnson Headlam (née Sowerby) (1837–1888). His father was the fifth of seven sons of Rev. John Headlam, and Thomas Emerson Headlam was one of his uncles. Through his mother, he was descended from the classical scholar Richard Bentley, Master of Trinity College, Cambridge.

He attended Elstree School in Hertfordshire and Harrow School, where the headmaster was Dr H. M. Butler, later Master of Trinity College, Cambridge. On leaving Harrow Headlam studied at King's College, Cambridge from 1884 to 1887 where he gained a First in the Classical Tripos, as well as receiving a number of other academic awards including seven Browne medals for Greek and Latin odes and epigrams and the Porson Prize. At Cambridge he became a member of a small society of friends known as the Twice a Fortnight Club, often abbreviated to TAF; this was made up of students from King's College and Trinity College who would meet every Sunday evening for supper. Fellow members included James Kenneth Stephen, Stanley Mordaunt Leathes, M. R. James and Henry Babington Smith. King's College appointed him a fellow in 1890 after which he took up a teaching post within the college. Despite his eccentricity and scholarship he was extremely popular with his students, possibly because of their common interest in cricket, music, and hunting.

== Academic work ==
From 1890 Headlam concentrated much of his work on the ancient Greek tragedian Aeschylus, publishing translations and papers on his plays.

Headlam gained his MA in 1891, and was awarded the degree of DLitt in 1903. In 1906 he applied for the post of Regius Chair of Greek, one of the oldest Professorships at the University of Cambridge, the chair having been founded by Henry VIII in 1540. Shy by nature, to his discomfort his application required that he should deliver a public lecture, which he gave on the second chorus of Aeschylus' Agamemnon. Although Headlam did not gain the post he admired the successful candidate, the Classicist Henry Jackson. Headlam's lecture was greatly admired and his name became known in Classical circles.

Deeply interested in textual criticism, "in order to elucidate difficult passages he read exceptionally widely in Greek texts of the classical and post-classical periods". A series of newly discovered papyri containing Greek texts such as the Oxyrhynchus Papyri led to possibly his best-known work, an edition of the Mimes of Herodas, completed after his death by A. D. Knox and published in 1922. This continues to be an important source of information for specialists and has been described as "remain[ing] the most detailed scholarly commentary in existence".

Apart from his translations from Greek into English Headlam also wrote English verse. Many of these were collected by his brother Cecil Headlam and published in 1910. In addition, Walter Headlam wrote articles for the 1911 Encyclopædia Britannica, signing his work "W. G. H." A friend was Virginia Woolf, with whom he had a "brief flirtation". Just before his death he gave a course of lectures in London, and was preparing a series to be given in Cambridge on Greek Ideas.

The classical scholar John Edwin Sandys, in his A History of Classical Scholarship (1908), wrote of Headlam, "Only nine days before his death, he had the pleasure of meeting Wilamowitz, who, in the course of his brief visit to Cambridge, said of some of Walter Headlam's Greek verses that, if they had been discovered in an Egyptian papyrus, they would immediately have been recognised by all scholars as true Greek poetry".

Walter George Headlam died suddenly in St George's Hospital in London in June 1908 from 'an accidental twist of an intestine' after having been taken ill in a hotel. He was buried at Wycliffe in Yorkshire, the home of his mother's family.

He planned to publish a full edition of the plays of Aeschylus but his death prevented its completion. However, he left annotated copies of the text which have been used since by scholars. Headlam's notes were transcribed by George Thomson, who included them in his edition of Aeschylus' Oresteia, The Oresteia of Aeschylus (1938). Martin Litchfield West wrote of Headlam, "Many of his conjectures were injudicious, but at their best they have a profundity and elegance that Wilamowitz seldom if ever achieved".

== Published works ==
- Fifty Poems of Meleager, London: Macmillan and Co. (1890)
- On Editing Aeschylus: A Criticism, London: David Nutt (1891)
- The Suppliants of Aeschylus. Translated by Walter Headlam, M.A., George Bell & Sons (Bell's Classical Translations) (1900)
- A Book of Greek Verse, Cambridge University Press (1907)
- Herodas: The Mimes and Fragments. With notes by Walter Headlam ... Edited by A.D. Knox., Cambridge University Press (1922)
