= Whorlton, County Durham =

Village in County Durham, England

Coordinates: 54.53018°N 1.83849°W

Whorlton
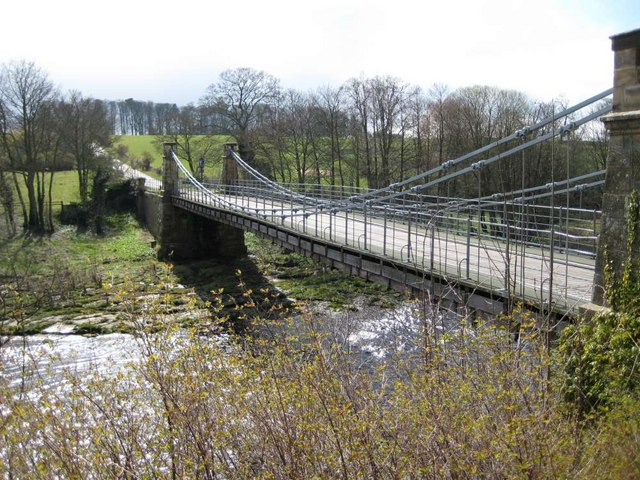
- The suspension bridge

- Location within County Durham
- Population: 302 (including Westwick .2011)
- OS grid reference: NZ105149
- Unitary authority: County Durham
- Ceremonial county: County Durham
- Region: North East
- Country: England
- Sovereign state: United Kingdom
- Post town: DARLINGTON
- Postcode district: DL12
- Police: Durham
- Fire: County Durham and Darlington
- Ambulance: North East

Whorlton is a small village in County Durham, in England. It is situated near the River Tees and to the east of Barnard Castle.

Whorlton Bridge is a 183-foot-long (56 m) suspension bridge that crosses the River Tees. It is Britain's second oldest suspension bridge relying on original chainwork, after the union bridge over the River Tweed.

The village has a public house called "The Bridge Inn".

Arthur Headlam and James Wycliffe Headlam were both born in the village.

== History ==
In October 1829, Whorlton Bridge, then under construction, was destroyed when the River Tees flooded. John Green of Newcastle upon Tyne was called upon to design a replacement. He based the Whorlton Bridge on the Scotswood Bridge, which he had designed earlier. Construction began in 1830, and the bridge was opened in July 1831.
