= Cecil Headlam =

English cricketer and author

Cecil Headlam (19 September 1872 – 12 August 1934) was an English author and first-class cricketer active in 1895–1908, who played for Middlesex and Oxford University. He was born in Paddington; died in Charing. He was also a cricket historian.

Headlam was the fifth son of Edward Headlam (1824–1882) and his wife Mary Anne Johnson Sowerby. He had four older brothers and a sister. His father was the fifth of seven sons of Rev. John Headlam and his wife Maria Wilson-Morley.

Headlam was educated at Rugby School, then won a demyship at Magdalen College, Oxford. He travelled extensively and wrote travel books and histories, and edited anthologies including a collection of the poems of his brother Walter.

His recreations included cricket, fishing, golf, climbing, and gardening.

In 1913, Headlam married Mary May Elles Fraser.

== Works ==
- The Story of Nuremberg. Dent. 1899.
- Peter Vischer. Bell. 1901.
- The Marriage of Mr. Molyneux. Hurst & Blackett. 1901.
- The Story of Chartres. Dent. 1902.
- Friends that Fail Not: Light Essays Concerning Books. Hurst & Blackett. 1902.
- Ten Thousand Miles through India and Burmah: Account of Oxford Authentics' Cricket Tour with Mr. K. J. Key in Year of Coronation Durbar. Dent. 1903.
- Oxford and its Story. Dent. 1904.
- Provence and Languedoc. Methuen. 1912.

== Primary Sources ==
- Headlam, Walter & Cecil, Walter Headlam, His Letters and Poems, London: Duckworth, 1908
