= Edward Headlam =

Director of the Royal Indian Marine from 1922 to 1928

Captain Sir Edward Headlam CSI CMG DSO FRGS
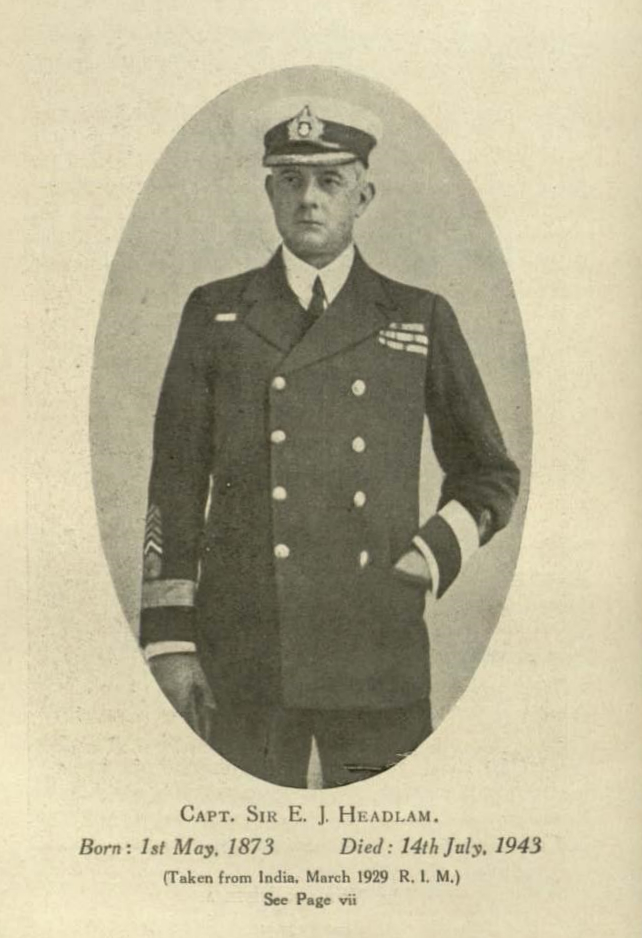
- Capt. Sir Edward James Headlam
- Born: 1 May 1873; Darlington, England
- Died: 14 July 1943 (aged 70); Hove, England
- Education: Durham School, HMS Conway
- Spouse: Nancy Hobson née Benyon
- Military career
- Allegiance: British India
- Branch: Royal Indian Marine
- Service years: 24 July 1889 - 6 Sept 1929
- Rank: Captain
- Known for: Penultimate Director of Royal Indian Marine

Captain Sir Edward James Headlam CSI CMG DSO FRGS (1 May 1873 – 14 July 1943) was the Director of the Royal Indian Marine for six years from 1922 to 1928. His suggestions were instrumental in transforming the RIM into a combatant navy in the form of the Royal Indian Navy. He was nicknamed by his men, 'Purana Nimak', urdu for 'old salt'.

== Life ==
Edward James Headlam was born on 1 May 1873 in Darlington, to Morley Headlam (1822–1884) of Gilmonby Hall, Yorkshire, and Whorlton Grange, Durham, and his wife Louisa Kate Beamish. His father was the fourth of seven sons of Rev. John Headlam. Thomas Emerson Headlam was one of his uncles and Maj.-Gen. Sir John Emerson Wharton Headlam was his eldest brother.

Headlam married Nancy Benyon, widow of Stanley Hobson of Nigeria in 1918. After retirement, he lived in Brighton. Headlam died on 14 July 1943 in Hove.

== Career ==
On 24 July 1889 Headlam was appointed a midshipman in the Royal Naval Reserve whilst being educated in the training ship Conway. He became a Sub-Lieutenant on 3 Oct 1894 in the Royal Indian Marine, serving in the Marine Survey. On 1 April 1900 he was promoted lieutenant.

As a sub-lieutenant, while serving aboard RIMS Mayo, he was part of a party led by Comte Carlo von Landberg which copied and photographed Himyaric inscriptions on 21 Feb 1896.

=== Appointments ===
- H.M. Training Ship Conway 1887-89
- White Star Line Sailing Ship 'Copley' 1889-93.
- Appointed sub-lieutenant, in Royal Indian Marine, 1894.
- Served in Squadron for Naval Defence of India (April-Oct.), 1897
- Marine Survey of India, 1897-1914
- Promoted to lieutenant, 1900
- Assistant Marine Transport Officer British Expeditionary Force, North China, 1900–01
- Persian Gulf Gun-running Operations, 1911–12
- Promoted to commander, 1913
- Naval Transport Officer East African Forces, 1914–17
- Special promotion to captain, 1914–15
- Principal Naval Transport Officer, South and East Africa, 1917–19
- Principal Naval Transport Officer, East Indies, 1920
- Promoted to acting captain.
- Promoted to captain.
- Director Royal Indian Marine, 1922–28
- Retired from service on 6 Sept 1929.

== Delhi Durbar, 1911 ==
At the Delhi Durbar of 1911, he was in charge of the Naval Contingent Camp. Here, he was in command of Lascars and Stokers of the RIM. To them was entrusted the duty of dealing with the Royal Standard at all ceremonies, while two men under a petty officer were continually at the King's Camp to see that the flag “flew clear.”

The lofty flagstaff used at the Durbar was designed by Captain Lumsden, Director of the Royal Indian Marine, and made at the Bombay Dockyard, as was also the great Standard flown from this mast, which measured thirty-six by eighteen feet.

The duties of the contingent were to form Guards of Honour for King George V at the following functions :- State Entry, Foundation Stone of All-India Memorial Ceremony, Durbar, Review and State Departure.

== WWI ==
As the Marine Transport Officer, Indian Expeditionary Force, East Africa, he was part of the landing and evacuation operations during the Battle of Tanga. For the evacuation, timed to start on a rising tide, at 1 pm. Cdr Headlam had assembled 30 Ship' boats, manned by volunteers. At 3:20 pm the evacuation was complete.

"All military transport afloat, i.e., hired transport, tugs, lighters, etc., are under the orders of Commander E. J. Headlam, Royal Indian Marine, Marine Transport Officer, I.E.F. East Africa."- Addendum to Operation Order No. 1 dated 1 Nov 1914, by Maj Gen A E Aitken.

On 18th Dec 1914, he made a feint of landing at Moa, and went on to Manza Bay, where he made prizes of some small crafts. He was commanding transport ships Barjora and Rheinfels, carrying a company of the 63rd PLI and a section of the 28th Mountain Battery of the Royal Artillery.

== Work with Bombay Port Trust ==
From 1917 to 1922 he was acting member of the Board of Trustees of Bombay Port Trust, representing Neville Frederick Jarvis Wilson, and later Henry Lancelot Mawbey, the Directors of Royal Indian Marine.

On 7 Jul 1922 he was appointed to the Board of Trustees of Bombay Port Trust, due to the resignation of Rear-Admiral H L Mawbey. Cdr H M Salmond was to represent him on the board during his absence.

On 4 Aug 1922 he was appointed Director of the Royal Indian Marine.

== Evolution of Royal Indian Marine ==
=== Indian Mercantile Marine Committee ===
On 12th Jan 1922 the Indian Legislative Assembly adopted a resolution moved by Sir P S Sivaswami Iyer. On 3rd Feb 1923 Indian Mercantile Marine Committee was appointed to consider and report what measures could be taken to further the objectives of the resolution, which were:

1. to recognise the need for the training of Indians for nautical careers and encouraging the creation of an Indian Mercantile Marine.
2. to accept the policy and measures recommended by the Indian Mercantile Marine Committee.
3. to take early steps for the training of Indians in a suitable training ship in Indian waters, for the provision of facilities for future training as apprentices in our mercantile marine ships, and for their employment after completion of their training.
4. to arrange from the establishment of primary nautical schools in selected marine stations, and the introduction of Marine Engineering as a subject of instruction in the Engineering College at Sibpur. and
5. to announce his intention to adopt in the near future a system of licensing in respect of the coastal trade of India.

The committee was presided by Capt. Headlam, and consisted of Sir Arthur H Froom, Lalubhai Samaldas, Jadu Nath Roy, Sir John Biles, and Diwan Bahadur Tiruvenkata Rangachariar. J H Green served as secretary.

Committee had important observations and recommendations.

- The repeal of the Indian Coasting Trade Act of 1860.

"We are of opinion that in the interests of the growth of an Indian Meroontile Marine it is necessary to dose the coasting trade of this country to shins belonging to the subjects of foreign nations"

- Regarding training and apprenticeship, the committee observed.
  It is our considered opinion that the provision of facilities for the training of Indian officers and engineers alone is not sufficient to meet the requirements of the case and that some further steps are required to achieve the object in view. These further steps, we recommend, should be in the form of the eventual reservation of the Indian coasting trade for ships the ownership and controlling interests in which are predominantly Indian.
- The Committee added that for the fulfillment of these conditions a ship should conform to the following conditions;
  1. Ship should be registered in India.
  2. It should be owned and managed by an individual Indian or by a Joint Stock Company (public or private) which is registered in India with rupee capital, with a majority of Indians on the Directorate and with a majority of its shares held by Indians.
  3. Management of such company is predominantly in the hand of Indians.
- The Committee recognised that the Royal Indian Marine should be reorganised into an Indian Navy for the defence of India's coast, harbours, and shipping.
- That a training ship on the lines of the Worcester or the Conway should be established at Bombay to train young Indians to be- come Sea-officers.

=== Rawlinson Committee ===
Based on the recommendations of the Headlam Committee's report another independent committee was set up for "the reorganization of the Royal Indian Marine". The committee convened in Feb 1925 and was presided by Gen Lord Rawlinson. Headlam was also part of this committee. The goal was to draw up a scheme for the purpose of putting into effect a policy to "The reconstruction of the Royal Indian Marine as a combatant force, to enable India to enter upon the first stage of her own naval development, and ultimately to undertake her own naval defence".

=== The Indian Navy Bill and the Indian Navy (Discipline) Act 1934 ===
Based upon the previous two committee reports, the Indian Navy bill was tabled in the British parliament on 2 Mar 1927. After much debate, the Bill was passed on the third reading in the House of Commons, and on the second reading in the House of Lords, on 5 and 28 April respectively. The bill received royal assent on 29 June, and became the Government of India (Indian Navy) Act 1927 (17 & 18 Geo. 5. c. 8).

The act empowered the Indian Legislature to enact and adapt the Indian Navy (Discipline) Act, 1934, which assented to by the Viceroy on 8 Sep 1934.

On 2 October 1934 at Bombay, the Royal Indian Marine ceased to exist and the Royal Indian Navy was inaugurated.

== Awards and honours ==
- On 14 October 1900 he received a Bronze Medal from the Royal Humane Society for rescuing a Sepoy who had fallen overboard from the transport ship "Wardha" off Taku.
- Medal and Mentioned in Despatch, China, 1900-01.
- He was mentioned in dispatch dated 17 Jan 1901 by Gen. Gaselee for services to the forces in China.
- Military order of the dragon
- Medal and Clasp, Persian Gulf, 1911-12.
- Bronze Star; 1914-15 Star; British War and Victory Medals; Mentioned in Despatches four times.
- He received the Distinguished Service Order on 1 Jan 1916.
- Mentioned in Despatches, 30 Jan 1917, East Africa.
- CMG in 1919.
- Was made Companion of the Star of India in the 1924 Birthday Honours
- He was nominated for knighthood in June 1928 and knighted on 27 March 1929 at St. James Palace.

== Writings ==
A New Island in the Bay of Bengal, The Geographical Journal, Vol. 29, No. 4 (Apr., 1907)

The History of the Royal Indian Marine, Journal of the Royal Society of Arts, Vol. 77, No. 3985 (APRIL 5th, 1929), pp. 519–540 (22 pages)

The Royal Indian Navy, History of the Government Sea Service in India from the earliest time.

1. Part 1
2. Part 2
3. Part 3
4. Part 4

Report of the Indian Mercantile Marine Committee, 1923-24

The Rawlinson Committee Report.

== Arms ==
Arms : Gules, on a chevron or, between three lambs' heads erased argent, three crosses patee fitchee sable.

Crest : An unicorn passant or, the dexter foreleg resting upon a cross patee fitchee sable.

Motto: Intellectu et innocentia.
