= Bassareus =

Epithet of the god Dionysus

Bassareus (Ancient Greek: Βασσαρεύς) was an epithet of the Greek god Dionysus, with varied significance, as being the wearer of distinctive fox robes, or as a symbolic fox, or the protector of vineyards.

It is a very old epithet, with evidence on Linear B tablets dating back to Mycenaean Greece, that is, the 2nd millennium BCE.

== Name ==
=== Greek origins ===
According to the explanations of the Greeks, the name "Bassareus" is derived from bassara or bassaris (βασσάρα or βασσαρίς), the long robe which the god himself and the Maenads used to wear in Thrace, where the Maenads were themselves often called bassarae or the bassarides, as in the lost play of Aeschylus, Bassarae. And in Latin poetry, a follower of Dionysus is often called a bassaris.

The name of this garment seems to be connected with, or rather the same as, the Lydian word bassaris (βασσαρίς), meaning "fox", probably because it was originally made of fox-skins.

Several scholars have pointed out the fact that foxes eat grapes, and are in fact one of the chief pests of vineyards, and are called out as such many times in ancient literature, thereby making a connection of fox-robed Dionysus as the protector of vineyards. And there is a story in which the wrath of Dionysus manifested as a plague of foxes sent to pester Thebes.

=== Semitic language origins ===
Others derive the name Bassareus from a Semitic word, bāșar, which could mean "flesh", often referring to an unripe grape, according to which its meaning would be the same as the Greek protrygis (προτρύγης), that is, the precursor of the vintage. This could also mean "to cut or tear to pieces", referring to the violent rites and imagery of Dionysus, as in the Maenads tearing Orpheus to pieces in Greek mythology.

== Archaeology ==
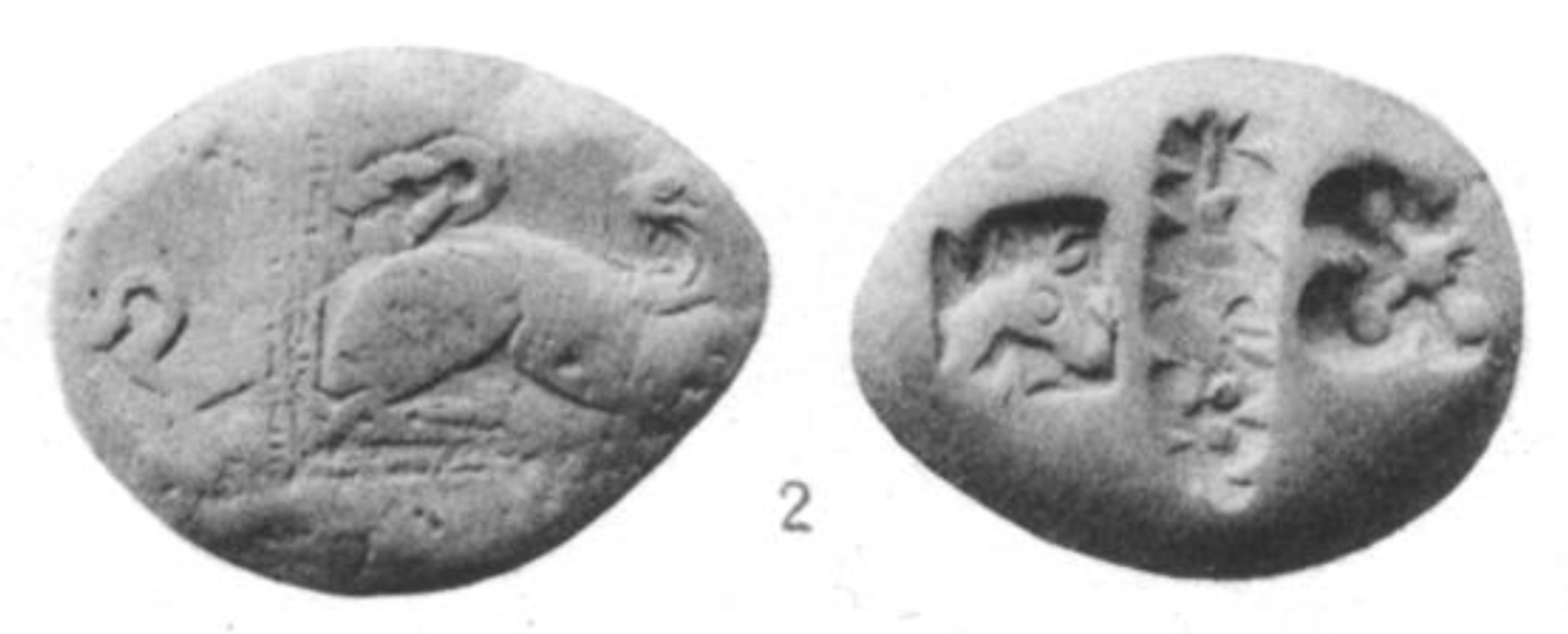
7th century BCE stater, likely from Miletus, showing a running fox in the center of the reverse (right), which some scholars have suggested denotes Dionysus Bassareus.

The 19th-century French archaeologist François Lenormant claimed to have assembled a series of ancient Lydian coins, including many with an incuse of a fox, and suggested they were part of a series of coins bearing the symbol of Dionysus Bassareus. Other scholars disputed whether the coins in question bear any imprint of a fox at all.

At least one other archaeologist claimed to have unearthed fox coins depicting Dionysus Bassareus in Cyzicus, though some numismatists consider their identification with Bassareus to be dubious.

== Cult ==
While strongly associated with Lydian tradition, scholars have connected the fox symbolism of Bassareus with cultic Dionysus art discovered as far away as Cologne.

Discoveries of altars on Milos suggest a cult of Bassareus on that island dates to the 5th century BCE, brought by colonists from Athens.

We elsewhere have evidence of cult ceremonies in which "many knobbed" cakes (Ancient Greek: πόπανα πολυόμφαλα, or popana polyomphala) were placed in a mystic cista for Dionysus Bassareus.
