= Huntington MS 20 =

Uncial manuscript of the New Testament

Huntington 20 is a Bohairic-Greek, uncial manuscript of the New Testament, on paper. Palaeographically it has been assigned to the 13th century.

== Description ==
It contains the text of the four Gospels on 333 paper leaves (24.2 by 17.3). The text is written in 1 column per page, 24 lines per page. It contains numerals of the κεφαλαια at the margin (in Coptic and Greek), the Ammonian Sections, the Eusebian Canons, and illuminations. The manuscript omits the additions in Matthew 17:11; Luke 22:43.44 (the agony); John 5:3.4 (the descent of the angel); Pericope Adultera (7:53-8:11), but contains those of Matthew 23:13 (after verse 14); Luke 23:17.34.

The manuscript was examined by Lightfoot and Headlam. Horner used it in his edition of the Bohairic New Testament.

Currently it is housed at the Bodleian Library (Huntington 20) in Oxford.

== See also ==
- Coptic versions of the Bible
- Biblical manuscript
- Huntington MS 17
- British Library, Add MS 5995
- Oriental MS 425
