= James Headlam-Morley =

British historian, classicist and civil servant (1863–1929)

Sir James Wycliffe Headlam-Morley, CBE (24 December 1863 – 6 September 1929) was a British academic historian and classicist. He became a civil servant and government advisor on current foreign policy. He was known as James Wycliffe Headlam until 1918, when he changed his surname to Headlam-Morley by royal licence. He was nominated Knight Bachelor in 1929 for public service, but died before his investiture ceremony.

== Family ==
He was the second son of Arthur William Headlam (1826–1908), vicar of Whorlton, County Durham, and was the younger brother of Arthur Cayley Headlam (1862–1947), Bishop of Gloucester. His father was the sixth of seven sons of Rev. John Headlam, and Thomas Emerson Headlam was one of his uncles.

In 1893, he married Elisabeth Charlotta Henrietta Ernestina Sonntag (1866–1950), a German musician and composer who was also known as Else Headlam-Morley. The historian Agnes Headlam-Morley (1902–1986) was their daughter.

== Education and career ==
He was educated at Eton, King's College, Cambridge (B.A., 1887), and in Germany where he studied with Treitschke and Hans Delbrück. From 1894–1900 he was Professor of Greek and Ancient History at Queen's College, London.

An influential figure, he worked on propaganda in World War I. At the end of the war, he was appointed as a Foreign Office specialist on the British Empire Delegation to the Paris Peace Conference. He was involved in the drafting of the Versailles Treaty, especially regarding Danzig. He effectively sponsored Arnold J. Toynbee for appointment in 1924 to Chatham House, and Toynbee cited his views on "the geographical nucleus of the Western World" in the first volume of A Study of History. He also gathered materials on the diplomatic history of the origins of World War I as an official production of the British government and contributed to it, though the main editor was Harold Temperley. The historian Anna Cienciala attributes to Headlam and Sidney Edward Mezes, an academic and advisor to Woodrow Wilson and Executive Director of the Inquiry group, the 1919 proposal to make Danzig a free city.

He wrote numerous historical articles for the Encyclopædia Britannica editions of 1902 and 1911, signing them "J.W.He."

== Works ==
- On Election by Lot at Athens (1891); Headlam, James Wycliffe; MacGregor, D. C. (2014). pbk reprint of 1933 2nd edition. ISBN 978-1-107-65865-3; revision by D. C. MacGregor
- Bismarck and the Foundation of the German Empire (1899) (available online)
- A Short History of Germany and Her Colonies (1914) with Walter Alison Phillips and Arthur William Holland
- The History of Twelve Days, July 24 to August 4, 1914 (1915)
- The Dead Lands of Europe (1917)
- The German Chancellor and the Outbreak of War (1917)
- The Issue (1917)
- The Peace Terms of the Allies (1917)
- The Starvation of Germany (1917)
- British Documents on the Origins of the War 1898–1914 Volume XI The Outbreak of War Foreign Documents June 28 – August 4, 1914 (1926) editor
- Studies in Diplomatic History (1930)
- A Memoir of the Paris Peace Conference 1919 (1972) edited by Agnes Headlam-Morley, Russell Bryant and Anna Cienciala
