= Codex Marshall Or. 99 =

New Testament manuscript

Codex Marshall Or. 6, is a Bohairic, uncial manuscript of the New Testament, on a paper. Palaeographically it has been assigned to the 16th century.

== Description ==
It contains the text of the Gospel of John on 192 paper leaves (11.3 by 7). The text is written in 1 column per page, 12-14 lines per page. It contains numerals of the κεφαλαια (in Coptic) at the left margin, the Ammonian Sections, (not the Eusebian Canons), and portrait of John, the Evangelist.

The manuscript lacks John 5:3.4 (the descent of the angel) and Pericope Adulterae (7:53-8:11). According to Scrivener it is comparatively recent but interesting manuscript.

It has no date recorded. The manuscript was examined by Lightfoot and Headlam. Horner used it in his edition of the Bohairic New Testament.

Currently it is housed at the Bodleian Library (MS Marshall Or. 99) in Oxford.

== See also ==
- Coptic versions of the Bible
- Biblical manuscript
- Huntington MS 17
- Huntington MS 20
- Codex Marshall Or. 5
