= George William Horner =

George William Horner (1849–1930) was a British biblical scholar, an editor of the text of the New Testament in the dialects of the Coptic language.

In the Bohairic version, Horner edited in four volumes from 1898 to 1905. In the Sahidic version, he edited in 7 volumes from 1911 to 1924.

Another area of his interest was the liturgy of the Coptic and Ethiopic Church.

The text of the four Gospels, in the Bohairic edition, was established on the basis of Huntington MS 17; the Pauline epistles, Catholic epistles and the Acts of the Apostles on the basis of Oriental MS 424 and the Apocalypse, on Curzon MS 128.

== Works ==
- The Coptic Version of the New Testament in the northern dialect (Oxford 1898)
- The Coptic Versions of the New Testament in the Southern Dialect, volume II, Oxford 1911
- The service for the consecration of a church and altar according to the Coptic rite; edited with translations from a Coptic and Arabic manuscript of A.D. 1307 for the Bishop of Salisbury (London 1902)
- The statutes of the apostles; or, Canones ecclesiastici; edited with translation and collation from Ethiopic and Arabic mss.; also a translation of the Sahidic and collation of the Bohairic versions; and Sahidic fragments (London 1904)

== See also ==
- Coptic versions of the Bible
