= Arthur Headlam =

British bishop (1862–1947)

The Right Reverend Arthur Headlam CH
- Bishop of Gloucester
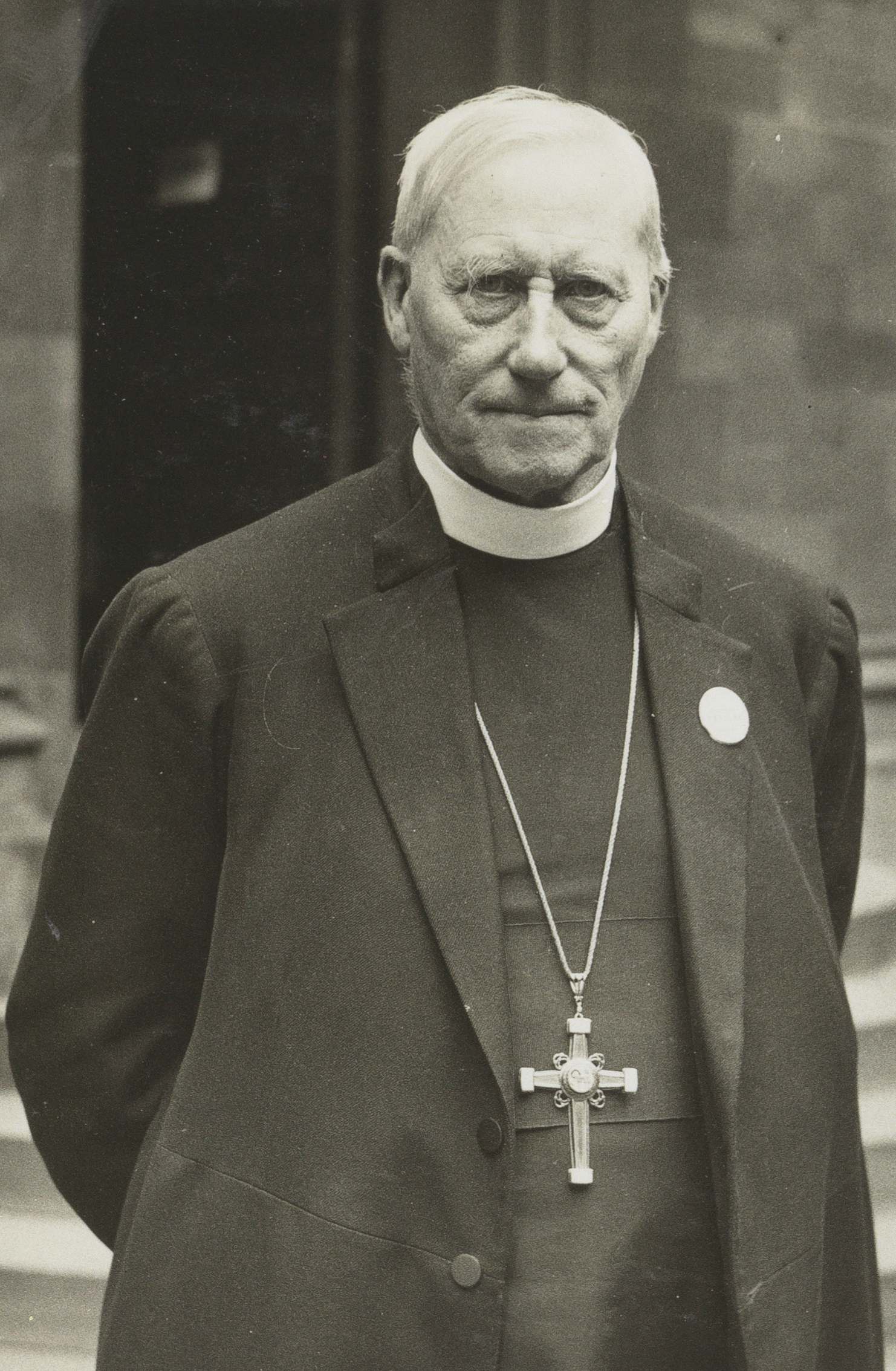
- Diocese: Gloucester
- Installed: 1923
- Term ended: 1945
- Predecessor: Edgar Gibson
- Successor: Wilfred Askwith
- Previous post: Regius Professor of Divinity, Oxford

Orders
- Ordination: 29 September 1888 by John Mackarness
- Consecration: 25 January 1923

Personal details
- Born: 2 August 1862 Whorlton, County Durham
- Died: 17 January 1947 (aged 84)
- Denomination: Anglican
- Parents: Arthur William Headlam; Agnes Favell
- Spouse: Evelyn Persis Wingfield (m. 1900)
- Education: New College, Oxford

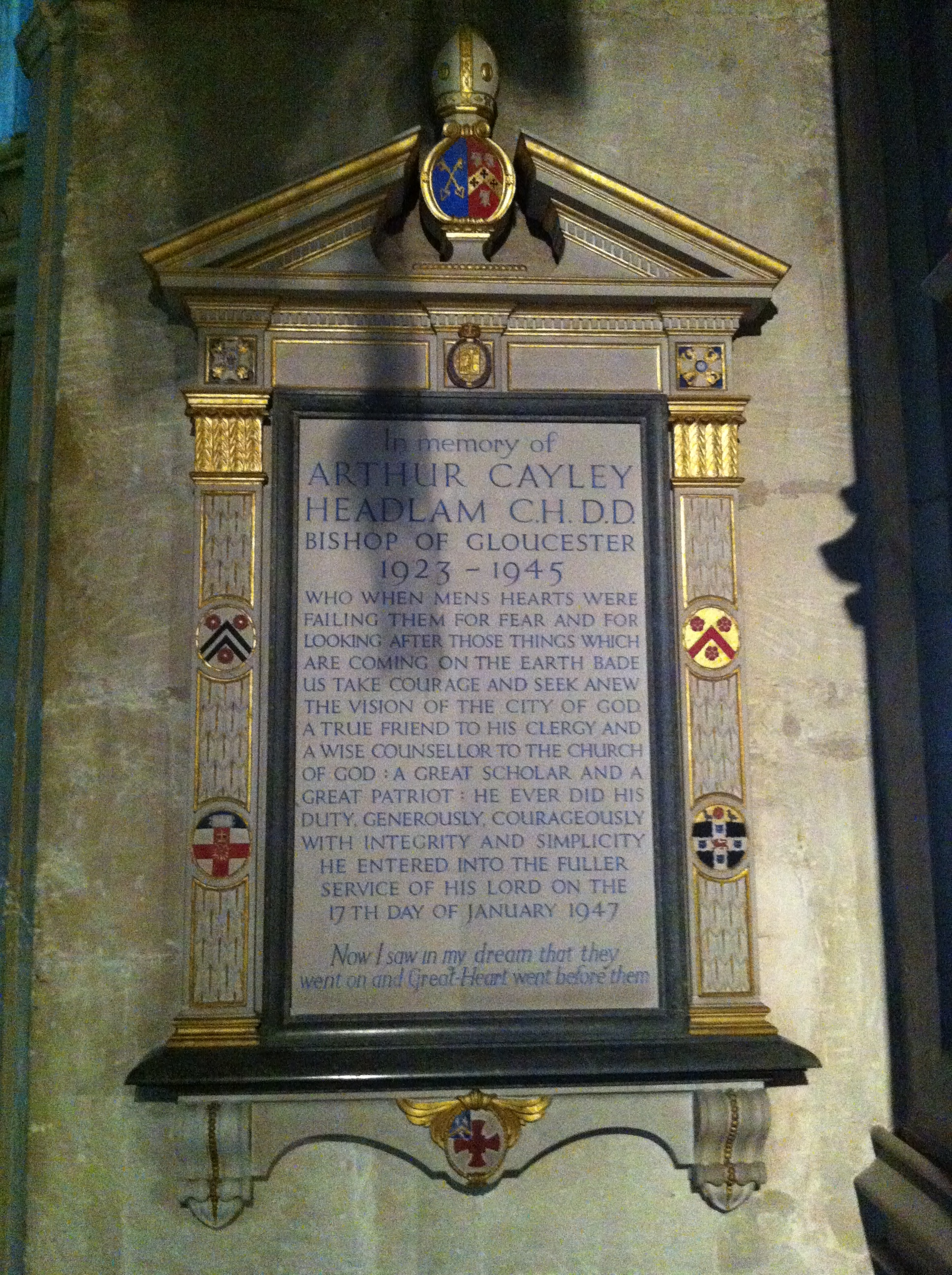
Memorial in Gloucester Cathedral

Arthur Cayley Headlam CH (2 August 1862 – 17 January 1947) was an English theologian who served as Bishop of Gloucester from 1923 to 1945.

== Biography ==
Headlam was born in Whorlton, County Durham, the son of its vicar, Arthur William Headlam (1826–1908), by his first wife, Agnes Favell. The historian James Wycliffe Headlam was his younger brother. He was educated at Winchester College and New College, Oxford, where he read Greats. He was a Fellow of All Souls College, Oxford, from 1885. He was ordained in 1888, and became Rector of Welwyn in 1896. In 1900 Headlam married Evelyn Persis Wingfield.

He was Professor of Dogmatic Theology at King's College London from 1903 to 1916, where he served as Principal from 1903 to 1912 and as the first Dean from 1908 until 1913. He was Regius Professor of Divinity, Oxford from 1918 to 1923. His 1920 Bampton Lectures showed the theme of ecumenism that would preoccupy him. At the time of the 1926 General Strike, he opposed the intervention of some of the other bishops.

He was influential in the Church of England's council on foreign relations in the 1930s, chairing the Committee on Relations with Episcopal Churches. He supported the Protestant Reich Church in Germany, and was a critic of the Confessing Church. He is thus generally considered an 'appeaser'. During the Nazi rise to power in 1933 he blamed German Jews for causing their own persecution, writing that they caused "the violence of the Russian Communists" and "Socialist communities" and were "not altogether a pleasant element in German, and in particular Berlin life."

He was appointed to the Order of the Companions of Honour (CH) in the 1921 Birthday Honours for his services at Oxford.

== Selected publications ==
- With William Sanday, A Critical and Exegetical Commentary on the Epistle to the Romans. Edinburgh: T&T Clark, 1895. Fifth Edition: 1902.
- The teaching of the Russian church : being notes on points on which it differs from the English church. London: The Eastern Church Association. 1897.
- Hogarth, David George, ed. (1899). "Christian Authority". Authority and Archaeology, Sacred and Profane: Essays on the relation of monuments to Biblical and Classical Literature. London: John Murray.
- The sources & authority of dogmatic theology : being an inaugural lecture. London: MacMillan & Co. 1903.
- "The dates of the New Testament Books". Criticism of the New Testament: St. Margaret's Lectures. New York: Charles Scribner's Sons. 1902. With William Sanday, Frederic Kenyon, F. Crawford Burkitt, & J. H. Bernhard.
- History, Authority and Theology. London: John Murray. 1909.
- St. Paul and Christianity. London: John Murray. 1913.
- The Miracles of the New Testament: Being the Moorhouse Lectures for 1914 delivered at St. Paul's Cathedral, Melbourne. London: John Murray. 1914.
- The study of Theology, an inaugural lecture delivered on 13 June 1918. Oxford: The Clarendon Press. 1918.
- The Doctrine of the Church and Christian reunion : being the Bampton Lectures for the year 1920. London: John Murray. 1920.
- The Anglicans, the Orthodox, and the Old Catholics: Notes on the Lambeth report on Unity. London: Society for Promoting Christian Knowledge. 1921. Archived from the original on 25 July 2013.
- The life and teaching of Jesus the Christ. New York: Oxford University Press. 1923.
- Christian Unity. London: Christian Student Movement Press. 1930.
- What it means to be a Christian. London: Faber & Faber. 1933.
- Christian Theology; the Doctrine of God. Oxford Clarendon Press. 1934.
- The Church of Roumania and the Anglican Communion. 1937.
- The Fourth Gospel as History. Oxford: Oxford University Press. 1946.

Academic offices
Preceded by Archibald Robertson	Principal of King's College London; 1903–1912	Succeeded by Ronald Burrows
New office	Dean of King's College London; 1908–1912	Succeeded by Alfred Caldecott
Preceded by Henry Scott Holland	Regius Professor of Divinity at Oxford; 1918—1923	Succeeded by Henry Leighton Goudge
Church of England titles
Preceded by Edgar Gibson	Bishop of Gloucester; 1923–1945	Succeeded by Wilfred Askwith
