= Bible =

Collection of religious texts

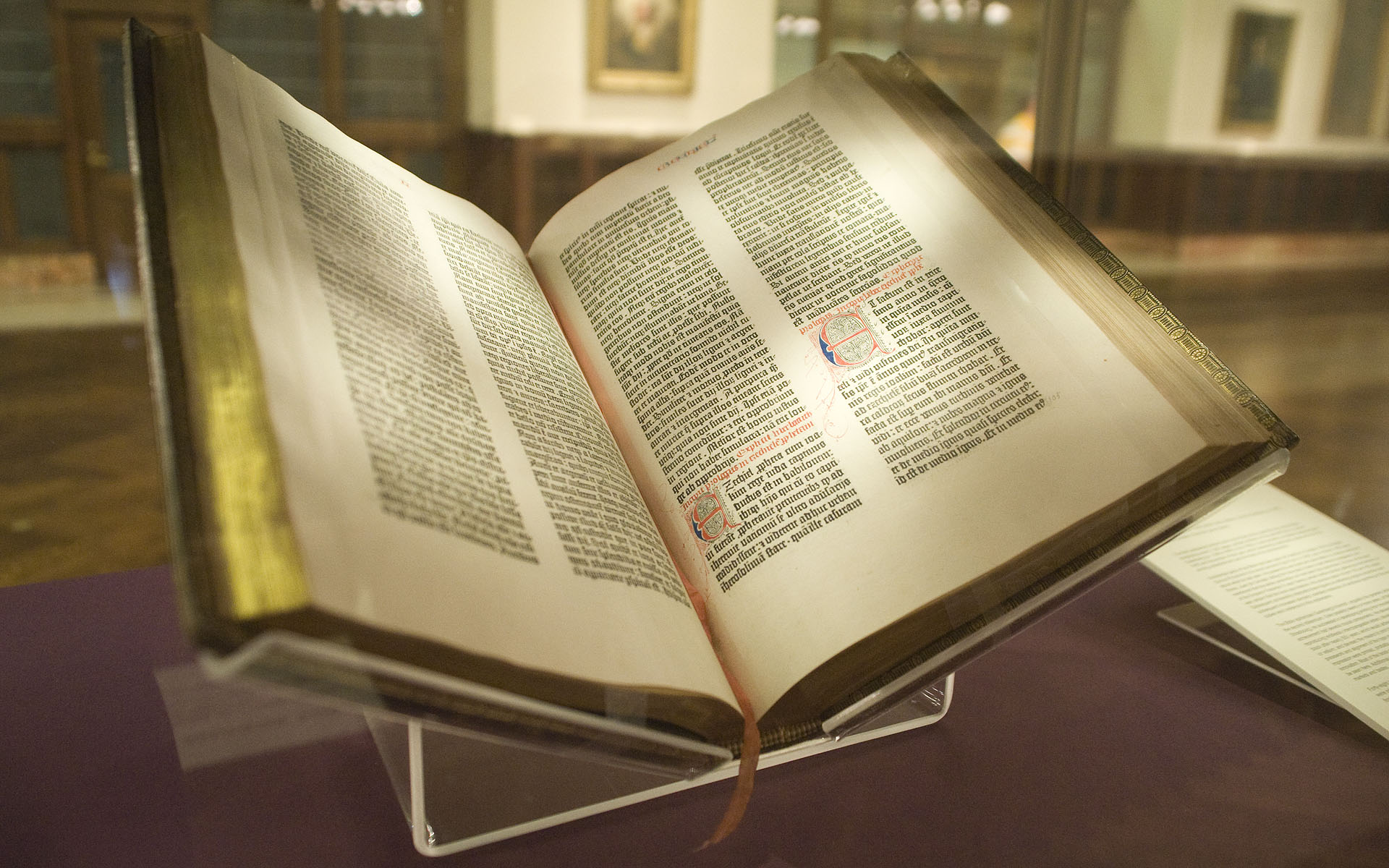
- The Gutenberg Bible, published in the mid-15th century by Johannes Gutenberg, is an early printed Bible
- Language: Hebrew (Majority of the Hebrew Bible); Aramaic (Daniel 2:4b–7:28, Ezra 4:8–6:18 and 7:12–26, and Jeremiah 10:11); Koine Greek (Septuagint and New Testament)
- Period: See Dating the Bible
- Books: Pentateuch: 5 books; Hebrew Bible: 24 books (Note: This figure counts the Books of Samuel, the Books of Kings, the Twelve Minor Prophets, the Books of Chronicles, and the Books of Ezra and Nehemiah as one book each, as they are counted in Judaism. If these are counted separately, as they are in Christianity, there are 39 books in the Hebrew Bible. Both of these figures exclude the deuterocanonical books.); Protestant canon (Luther's): 66 books; Catholic canon: 73 books; Eastern and Oriental Orthodox canon: 76 books; Ethiopian Orthodox canon: 81 books; See Biblical canon

Full text
- Bible at English Wikisource

The Bible (Note: from Koine Greek τὰ βιβλία, tà biblía, 'the books') is an anthology of religious texts that are central to Judaism and Christianity, and important in other Abrahamic religions such as Islam. The texts include instructions, stories, poetry, letters, prophecies, and other genres. The religious texts, or scriptures, were compiled by different religious communities into various official collections, called biblical canons. Believers generally consider the Bible to be a product of divine inspiration, but the way they understand what that means and how they interpret the text varies.

The Hebrew Bible, originally written in Hebrew, with some parts in Aramaic, is divided into three sections: the Torah ("Teaching"), Nevi'im ("Prophets") and Ketuvim ("Writings"). The acronym Tanakh (Hebrew: תָּנָ״ךְ, romanized: Tanaḵ) is an alternate term for the Hebrew Bible. The Masoretic Text, a medieval edition of the Tanakh, is considered the authoritative text of the Hebrew Bible by all branches of modern Rabbinic Judaism. The oldest parts of the Bible may be as early as c. 1200 BCE.

The Christian Bible is divided into the Old Testament and the New Testament. The Old Testament is a reorganization of the books of the Hebrew Bible and the deuterocanonical books, (Note: Christian traditions vary on which, if any, of the deuterocanonical books are included in the Old Testament) derived from historical editions of those texts. Christianity began as an outgrowth of Second Temple Judaism and the early Church continued the Jewish tradition of writing and incorporating what it saw as inspired, authoritative religious books. The gospels, which are narratives about the life and teachings of Jesus, along with the Pauline epistles and other texts quickly coalesced into the New Testament, originally written in Koine Greek, mostly in the 1st century CE.

With estimated total sales of over five billion copies, the Christian Bible is the best-selling publication of all time. Biblical texts have had a profound influence both on Western culture and history and on cultures around the globe. The study of these texts through biblical criticism has also indirectly impacted culture and history. Some view biblical texts as morally problematic, historically inaccurate, or corrupted by time; others find it a useful historical source for certain peoples and events or a source of ethical teachings. Biblical archaeology uses archaeological and textual evidence to assess the Bible’s historical claims, with evidence supporting some events but leaving others conclusively refuted. The Christian Bible is currently translated or in the process of being translated into about half of the world's languages.

== Etymology ==
The term 'Bible' can refer to the Hebrew Bible (which corresponds to the Christian Old Testament) or to the Christian Bible, which includes both the Old Testament and the New Testament.

The English word Bible is derived from Koine Greek: τὰ βιβλία, romanized: ta biblia, meaning 'the books' (singular βιβλίον, biblion). The word βιβλίον itself literally means 'scroll' and came to be used as the ordinary word for book. It is the diminutive of βύβλος byblos, 'Egyptian papyrus', possibly so called from the name of the Phoenician seaport Byblos (also known as Gebal) whence Egyptian papyri would be exported to Greece.

The Greek ta biblia was "an expression Hellenistic Jews used to describe their sacred books". The biblical scholar F. F. Bruce notes that John Chrysostom appears to be the first writer (in his Homilies on Matthew, delivered between 386 and 388 CE) to use the Greek phrase ta biblia ('the books') to describe both the Old and New Testaments together.

The Latin biblia sacra ('holy books') is a translation of the Greek τὰ βιβλία τὰ ἅγια (tà biblía tà hágia), which also means 'the holy books'. Medieval Latin biblia is short for biblia sacra 'holy book'. It gradually came to be regarded as a feminine singular noun (biblia, gen. bibliae) in medieval Latin, and so the word was loaned as singular into the vernaculars of Western Europe.

== Development and history ==
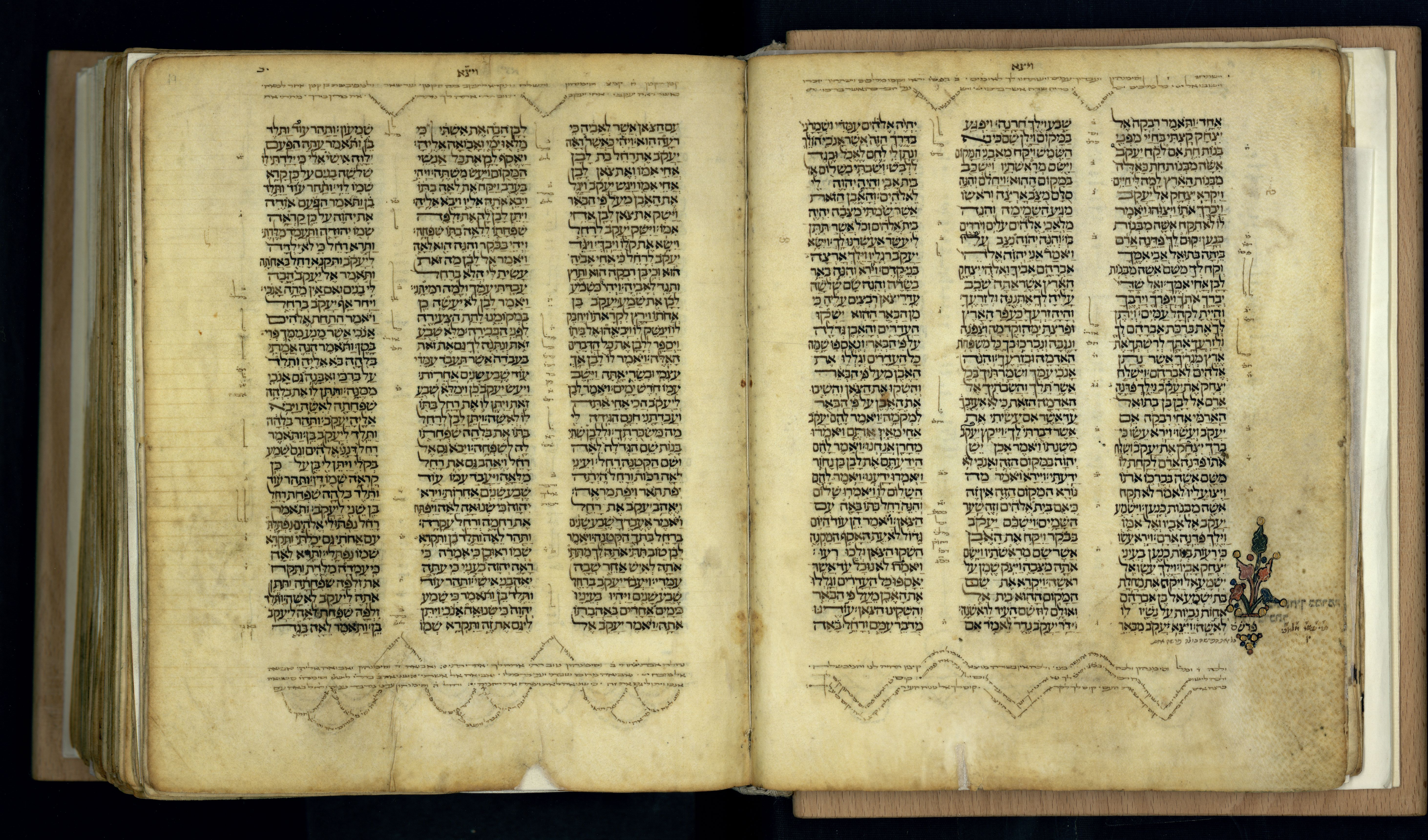
The Book of Genesis in a c. 1300 Hebrew Bible

The Great Isaiah Scroll (1QIsa^{a}), one of the Dead Sea Scrolls, is the oldest complete copy of the Book of Isaiah.

The complex development of the various texts that make up the Bible is still not completely understood. The oldest books began as songs and stories orally transmitted from generation to generation. Scholars of the twenty-first century are only in the beginning stages of exploring "the interface between writing, performance, memorization, and the aural dimension" of the texts. Current indications are that writing and orality were not separate as much as ancient writing was learned in communal oral performance. The Bible was written and compiled by many people, who many scholars say are mostly unknown, from a variety of disparate cultures and backgrounds.

British biblical scholar John K. Riches wrote:

[T]he biblical texts were produced over a period in which the living conditions of the writers – political, cultural, economic, and ecological – varied enormously. There are texts which reflect a nomadic existence, texts from people with an established monarchy and Temple cult, texts from exile, texts born out of fierce oppression by foreign rulers, courtly texts, texts from wandering charismatic preachers, texts from those who give themselves the airs of sophisticated Hellenistic writers. It is a time-span which encompasses the compositions of Homer, Plato, Aristotle, Thucydides, Sophocles, Caesar, Cicero, and Catullus. It is a period which sees the rise and fall of the Assyrian empire (twelfth to seventh century) and of the Persian empire (sixth to fourth century), Alexander's campaigns (336–326), the rise of Rome and its domination of the Mediterranean (fourth century to the founding of the Principate, 27 BCE), the destruction of the Jerusalem Temple (70 CE), and the extension of Roman rule to parts of Scotland (84 CE).

The books of the Bible were initially written and copied by hand on papyrus scrolls. No originals have survived. The age of the original composition of the texts is, therefore, difficult to determine and heavily debated. Using a combined linguistic and historiographical approach, Hendel and Joosten date the oldest parts of the Hebrew Bible (the Song of Deborah in Judges 5 and the Samson story of Judges 16 and 1 Samuel) to having been composed in the premonarchial early Iron Age (c. 1200 BCE). The Dead Sea Scrolls, discovered in the caves of Qumran in 1947, are copies that can be dated to between 250 BCE and 100 CE. They are the oldest existing copies of the books of the Hebrew Bible of any length that are not fragments.

The earliest manuscripts were probably written in paleo-Hebrew, the Levantine abjad of the Israelites. The exile to Babylon most likely prompted the shift to square script (Aramaic) in the fifth to third centuries BCE. From the time of the Dead Sea Scrolls, the Hebrew Bible was written with spaces between words to aid reading. By the eighth century CE, the Masoretes added vowel signs. Levites or scribes maintained the texts, and some texts were always treated as more authoritative than others. Scribes preserved and changed the texts by changing the script, updating archaic forms, and making corrections. These Hebrew texts were copied with great care.

Considered to be scriptures (sacred, authoritative religious texts), the books were compiled by different religious communities into various biblical canons (official collections of scriptures). The earliest compilation, containing the first five books of the Bible and called the Torah (meaning "law", "instruction", or "teaching") or Pentateuch ("five books"), was accepted as Jewish canon by the fifth century BCE. A second collection of narrative histories and prophesies, called the Nevi'im ("prophets"), was canonized in the third century BCE. A third collection called the Ketuvim ("writings"), containing psalms, proverbs, and narrative histories, was canonized sometime between the second century BCE and the second century CE. These three collections were written mostly in Biblical Hebrew, with some parts in Aramaic, which together form the Hebrew Bible or "TaNaKh" (an abbreviation of "Torah", "Nevi'im", and "Ketuvim").

=== Hebrew Bible ===
The historical version of the Hebrew Bible used by modern Jewish communities is the Masoretic Text. The Samaritan community uses the Samaritan Pentateuch, which contains only the first five books.

The Masoretes began developing what would become the authoritative Hebrew and Aramaic text of the 24 books of the Hebrew Bible in Rabbinic Judaism near the end of the Talmudic period (c. 300–c. 500 CE), but the actual date is difficult to determine. In the sixth and seventh centuries, three Jewish communities contributed systems for writing the precise letter-text, with its vocalization and accentuation known as the mas'sora (from which we derive the term "masoretic"). These early Masoretic scholars were based primarily in the Galilean cities of Tiberias and Jerusalem and in Babylonia (modern Iraq). Those living in the Jewish community of Tiberias in ancient Galilee (c. 750–950) made scribal copies of the Hebrew Bible texts without a standard text, such as the Babylonian tradition had, to work from. The canonical pronunciation of the Hebrew Bible (called Tiberian Hebrew) that they developed, and many of the notes they made, therefore, differed from the Babylonian. These differences were resolved into a standard text called the Masoretic text in the ninth century. The oldest complete copy still in existence is the Leningrad Codex dating to c. 1000 CE.

The Samaritan Pentateuch is a version of the Torah maintained by the Samaritan community since antiquity, which European scholars rediscovered in the 17th century; its oldest extant copies date to c. 1100 CE. Samaritans include only the Pentateuch (Torah) in their biblical canon. They do not recognize divine authorship or inspiration in any other book in the Jewish Tanakh. (Note: Although a paucity of extant source material makes it impossible to be certain that the earliest Samaritans also rejected the other books of the Tanakh, the 3rd-century church father Origen confirms that the Samaritans in his day "receive[d] the books of Moses alone." Schaff 1885, Chapter XLIX(Commentary on John 13:26)) A Samaritan Book of Joshua partly based upon the Tanakh's Book of Joshua exists, but Samaritans regard it as a non-canonical secular historical chronicle.

The first codex form of the Hebrew Bible was produced in the seventh century. The codex is the forerunner of the modern book. Popularized by early Christians, it was made by folding a single sheet of papyrus in half, forming "pages". Assembling multiples of these folded pages together created a "book" that was more easily accessible and more portable than scrolls. The first complete printed press version of the Hebrew Bible was produced in 1488.

=== Old Testament ===
The Septuagint is a translation of the Hebrew scriptures and some related texts into Koine Greek. The Septuagint, or the LXX, is believed to have been carried out by approximately seventy or seventy-two scribes and elders who were Hellenic Jews, begun in Alexandria in the late third century BCE and completed by 132 BCE. (Note: "[...] die griechische Bibelübersetzung, die einem innerjüdischen Bedürfnis entsprang [...] [von den] Rabbinen zuerst gerühmt (.) Später jedoch, als manche ungenaue Übertragung des hebräischen Textes in der Septuaginta und Übersetzungsfehler die Grundlage für hellenistische Irrlehren abgaben, lehte man die Septuaginta ab." Homolka, Jacob & Chorin 1999, pp. 43ff, Bd.3) Probably commissioned by Ptolemy II Philadelphus, King of Egypt, it addressed the need of the primarily Greek-speaking Jews of the Graeco-Roman diaspora. Existing complete copies of the Septuagint date from the third to the fifth centuries CE, with fragments dating back to the second century BCE. Revision of its text began as far back as the first century BCE. Fragments of the Septuagint were found among the Dead Sea Scrolls; portions of its text are also found on existing papyrus from Egypt dating to the second and first centuries BCE and to the first century CE.

=== New Testament ===
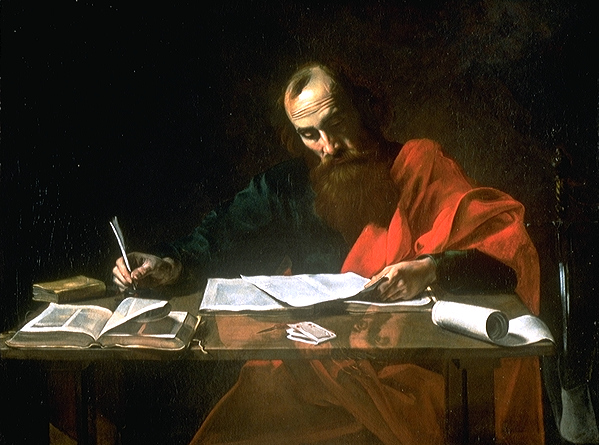
Paul the Apostle depicted in Saint Paul Writing His Epistles, a c. 1619 portrait by Valentin de Boulogne

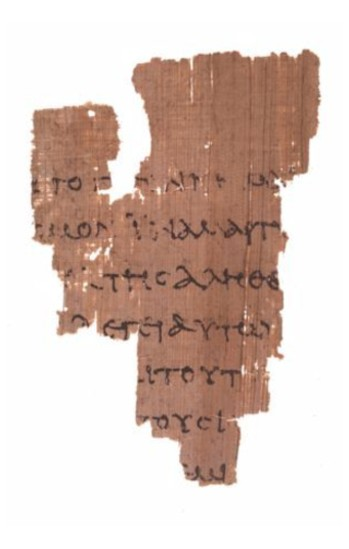
The Rylands fragment P52 verso, 125–175 CE, is the oldest existing fragment of New Testament papyrus, including phrases from the 18th chapter of the Gospel of John.

During the rise of Christianity in the first century CE, new scriptures were written in Koine Greek. Christians eventually called these new scriptures the "New Testament" and began referring to the Septuagint as the "Old Testament". The New Testament has been preserved in more manuscripts than any other ancient work. Most early Christian copyists were not trained scribes. Many copies of the gospels and Paul's letters were made by individual Christians over a relatively short period of time, very soon after the originals were written. There is evidence in the Synoptic Gospels, in the writings of the early Church Fathers, from Marcion, and in the Didache that Christian documents were in circulation before the end of the first century. Paul's letters were circulated during his lifetime, and his death is thought to have occurred before 68 during Nero's reign. Early Christians transported these writings around the Empire, translating them into Old Syriac, Coptic, Ethiopic, and Latin, and other languages.

New Testament scholar Bart Ehrman explains how these multiple texts later became grouped by scholars into categories:

During the early centuries of the church, Christian texts were copied in whatever location they were written or taken to. Since texts were copied locally, it is no surprise that different localities developed different kinds of textual tradition. That is to say, the manuscripts in Rome had many of the same errors, because they were for the most part "in-house" documents, copied from one another; they were not influenced much by manuscripts being copied in Palestine; and those in Palestine took on their own characteristics, which were not the same as those found in a place like Alexandria, Egypt. Moreover, in the early centuries of the church, some locales had better scribes than others. Modern scholars have come to recognize that the scribes in Alexandria – which was a major intellectual center in the ancient world – were particularly scrupulous, even in these early centuries, and that there, in Alexandria, a very pure form of the text of the early Christian writings was preserved, decade after decade, by dedicated and relatively skilled Christian scribes.

These differing histories produced what modern scholars refer to as recognizable "text types". The four most commonly recognized are Alexandrian, Western, Caesarean, and Byzantine.

The list of books included in the Catholic Bible was established as canon by the Council of Rome in 382, followed by those of Hippo in 393 and Carthage in 397. Between 385 and 405 CE, the early Christian church translated its canon into Vulgar Latin (the common Latin spoken by ordinary people), a translation known as the Vulgate. Since then, Catholic Christians have held ecumenical councils to standardize their biblical canon. The Council of Trent (1545–63), held by the Catholic Church in response to the Protestant Reformation, authorized the Vulgate as its official Latin translation of the Bible. A number of biblical canons have since evolved. Christian biblical canons range from the 73 books of the Catholic Church canon and the 66-book canon of most Protestant denominations to the 81 books of the Ethiopian Orthodox Tewahedo Church canon, among others. Judaism has long accepted a single authoritative text, whereas Christianity has never had an official version, instead having many different manuscript traditions.

=== Variants ===
All biblical texts were treated with reverence and care by those who copied them, yet there are transmission errors, called variants, in all biblical manuscripts. A variant is any deviation between two texts. Textual critic Daniel B. Wallace explains, "Each deviation counts as one variant, regardless of how many MSS [manuscripts] attest to it." Hebrew scholar Emanuel Tov says the term is not evaluative; it is a recognition that the paths of development of different texts have separated.

Medieval handwritten manuscripts of the Hebrew Bible were considered extremely precise: the most authoritative documents from which to copy other texts. Even so, Hebrew Bible scholar David Carr asserts that Hebrew texts still contain some variants. The majority of all variants are accidental, such as spelling errors, but some changes were intentional. In the Hebrew text, "memory variants" are generally accidental differences evidenced by such things as the shift in word order found in 1 Chronicles 17:24 and 2 Samuel 10:9 and 13. Variants also include the substitution of lexical equivalents, semantic and grammar differences, and larger scale shifts in order, with some major revisions of the Masoretic texts that must have been intentional.

Intentional changes in New Testament texts were made to improve grammar, eliminate discrepancies, harmonize parallel passages, combine and simplify multiple variant readings into one, and for theological reasons. Old Testament scholar Bruce K. Waltke observes that one variant for every ten words was noted in the recent critical edition of the Hebrew Bible, the Biblia Hebraica Stuttgartensia, leaving 90% of the Hebrew text without variation. The fourth edition of the United Bible Society's Greek New Testament notes variants affecting about 500 out of 6900 words, or about 7% of the text.

== Content and themes ==
=== Themes ===
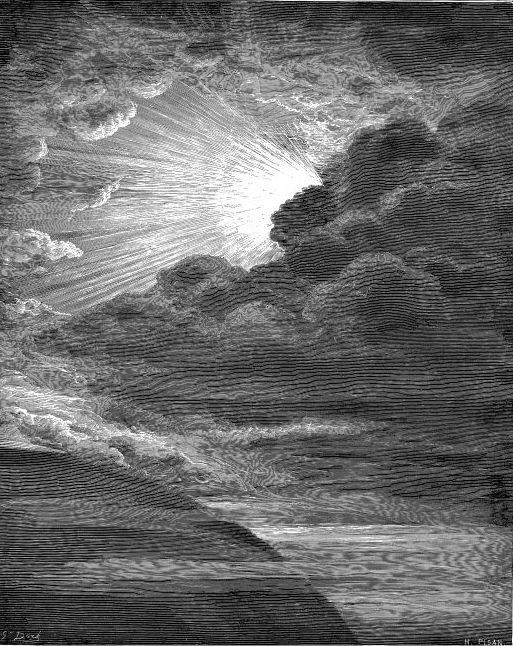
Creation of Light by Gustave Doré.

The narratives, laws, wisdom sayings, parables, and unique genres of the Bible provide opportunity for discussion on most topics of concern to human beings: The role of women, sex, children, marriage, neighbours, friends, the nature of authority and the sharing of power, animals, trees and nature, money and economics, work, relationships, sorrow and despair and the nature of joy, among others. Philosopher and ethicist Jaco Gericke adds: "The meaning of good and evil, the nature of right and wrong, criteria for moral discernment, valid sources of morality, the origin and acquisition of moral beliefs, the ontological status of moral norms, moral authority, cultural pluralism, [as well as] axiological and aesthetic assumptions about the nature of value and beauty. These are all implicit in the texts."

However, discerning the themes of some biblical texts can be problematic. Much of the Bible is in narrative form and in general, biblical narrative refrains from any kind of direct instruction, and in some texts the author's intent is not easy to decipher. It is left to the reader to determine good and bad, right and wrong, and the path to understanding and practice is rarely straightforward. God is sometimes portrayed as having a role in the plot, but more often there is little about God's reaction to events, and no mention at all of approval or disapproval of what the characters have done or failed to do. The writer makes no comment, and the reader is left to infer what they will. Jewish philosophers Shalom Carmy and David Shatz explain that the Bible "often juxtaposes contradictory ideas, without explanation or apology".

The Hebrew Bible contains assumptions about the nature of knowledge, belief, truth, interpretation, understanding and cognitive processes. Ethicist Michael V. Fox writes that the primary axiom of the book of Proverbs is that "the exercise of the human mind is the necessary and sufficient condition of right and successful behavior in all reaches of life". The Bible teaches the nature of valid arguments, the nature and power of language, and its relation to reality. According to Alan Mittleman, professor of Jewish philosophy, the Bible provides patterns of moral reasoning that focus on conduct and character.

In the biblical metaphysic, humans have free will, but it is a relative and restricted freedom. Beach says that Christian voluntarism points to the will as the core of the self, and that within human nature, "the core of who we are is defined by what we love". Natural law is in the Wisdom literature, the Prophets, Romans 1, Acts 17, and the book of Amos (Amos 1:3–2:5), where nations other than Israel are held accountable for their ethical decisions even though they do not know the Hebrew god. Political theorist Michael Walzer finds politics in the Hebrew Bible in covenant, law, and prophecy, which constitute an early form of almost democratic political ethics. Key elements in biblical criminal justice begin with the belief in God as the source of justice and the judge of all, including those administering justice on earth.

Carmy and Shatz say the Bible "depicts the character of God, presents an account of creation, posits a metaphysics of divine providence and divine intervention, suggests a basis for morality, discusses many features of human nature, and frequently poses the notorious conundrum of how God can allow evil."

=== Hebrew Bible ===
The authoritative Hebrew Bible is taken from the masoretic text (called the Leningrad Codex) which dates from 1008. The Hebrew Bible can therefore sometimes be referred to as the Masoretic Text.

The Hebrew Bible is also known by the name Tanakh (Hebrew: תנ"ך). This reflects the threefold division of the Hebrew scriptures, Torah ("Teaching"), Nevi'im ("Prophets") and Ketuvim ("Writings") by using the first letters of each word. It is not until the Babylonian Talmud (c. 550 CE) that a listing of the contents of these three divisions of scripture are found.

The Tanakh was mainly written in Biblical Hebrew, with some small portions (Ezra 4:8–6:18 and 7:12–26, Jeremiah 10:11, Daniel 2:4–7:28) written in Biblical Aramaic, a language which had become the lingua franca for much of the Semitic world.

==== Torah ====
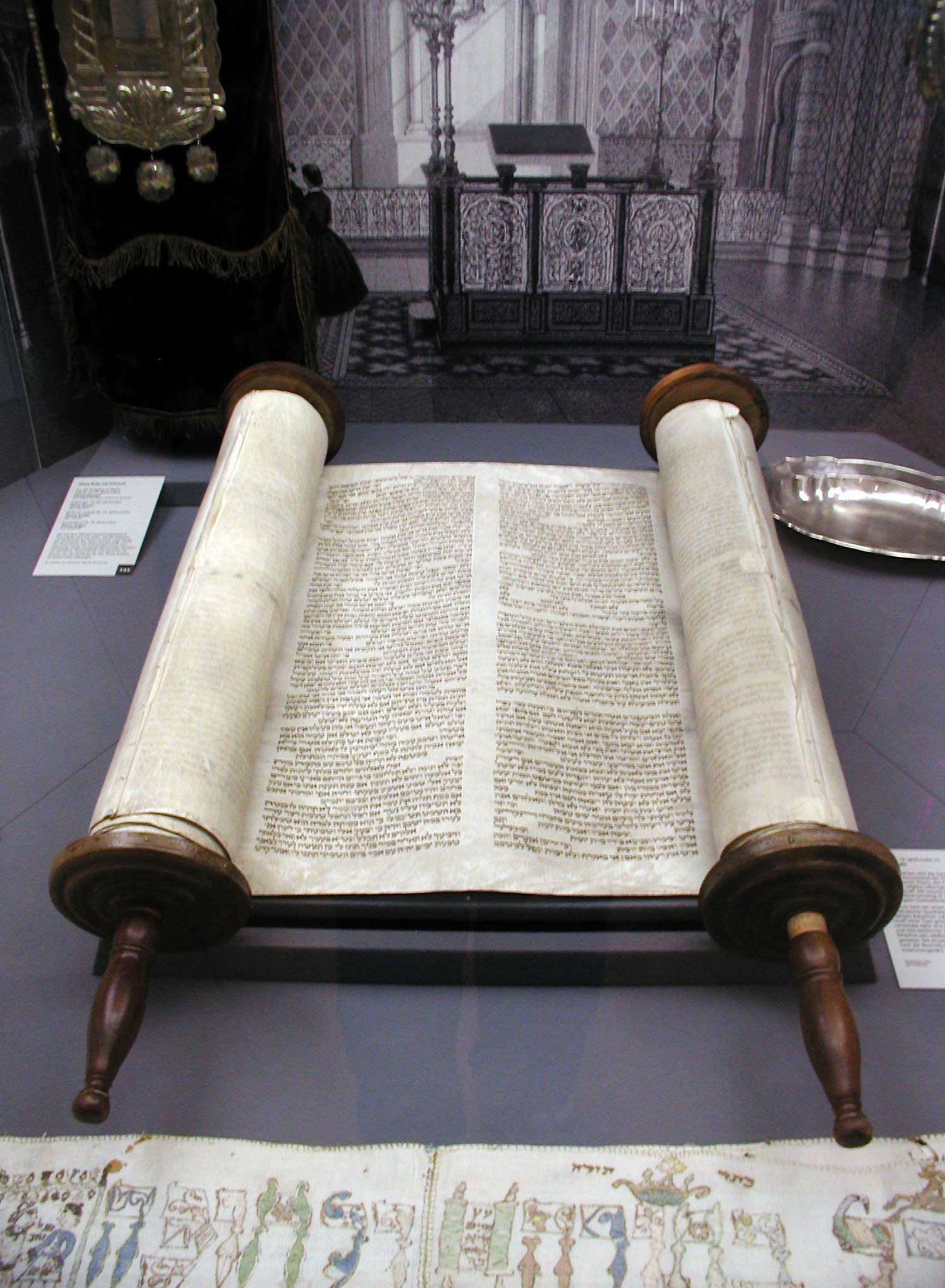
A Torah scroll recovered from Glockengasse Synagogue in Cologne

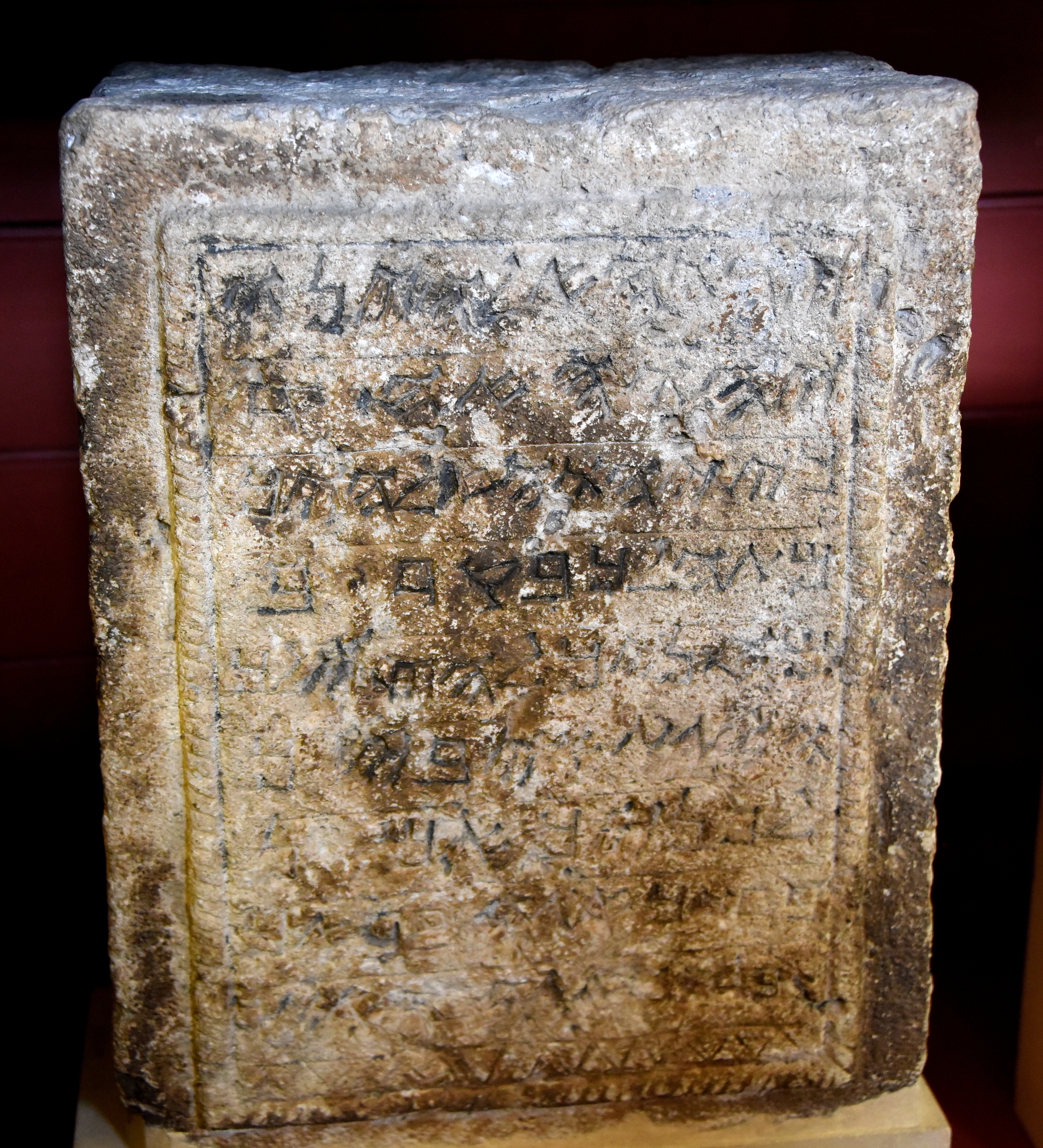
Samaritan Inscription containing a portion of the Bible in nine lines of Hebrew text, currently housed in the British Museum in London

The Torah (תּוֹרָה) is also known as the "Five Books of Moses" or the Pentateuch, meaning "five scroll-cases". Traditionally these books were considered to have been dictated to Moses by God himself. Since the 17th century, scholars have viewed the original sources as being the product of multiple anonymous authors while also allowing the possibility that Moses first assembled the separate sources. There are a variety of hypotheses regarding when and how the Torah was composed, but there is a general consensus that it took its final form during the reign of the Persian Achaemenid Empire (probably 450–350 BCE), or perhaps in the early Hellenistic period (333–164 BCE).

The Hebrew names of the books are derived from the first words in the respective texts. The Torah consists of the following five books:

- Genesis, Bereshith (בראשית)
- Exodus, Shemot (שמות)
- Leviticus, Vayikra (ויקרא)
- Numbers, Bamidbar (במדבר)
- Deuteronomy, Devarim (דברים)

The first eleven chapters of Genesis provide accounts of the creation (or ordering) of the world and the history of God's early relationship with humanity. The remaining thirty-nine chapters of Genesis provide an account of God's covenant with the biblical patriarchs Abraham, Isaac and Jacob (also called Israel) and Jacob's children, the "Children of Israel", especially Joseph. It tells of how God commanded Abraham to leave his family and home in the city of Ur, eventually to settle in the land of Canaan, and how the Children of Israel later moved to Egypt.

The remaining four books of the Torah tell the story of Moses, who lived hundreds of years after the patriarchs. He leads the Children of Israel from slavery in ancient Egypt to the renewal of their covenant with God at Mount Sinai and their wanderings in the desert until a new generation was ready to enter the land of Canaan. The Torah ends with the death of Moses.

The commandments in the Torah provide the basis for Jewish religious law. Tradition states that there are 613 commandments (taryag mitzvot).

==== Nevi'im ====
Nevi'im (Hebrew: נְבִיאִים, romanized: Nəḇī'īm, "Prophets") is the second main division of the Tanakh, between the Torah and Ketuvim. It contains two sub-groups, the Former Prophets (Nevi'im Rishonim נביאים ראשונים, the narrative books of Joshua, Judges, Samuel and Kings) and the Latter Prophets (Nevi'im Aharonim נביאים אחרונים, the books of Isaiah, Jeremiah and Ezekiel and the Twelve Minor Prophets).

The Nevi'im tell a story of the rise of the Hebrew monarchy and its division into two kingdoms, the Kingdom of Israel and the Kingdom of Judah, focusing on conflicts between the Israelites and other nations, and conflicts among Israelites, specifically, struggles between believers in "the LORD God" (Yahweh) and believers in foreign gods, (Note: "Each king is judged either good or bad in black-and-white terms, according to whether or not he "did right" or "did evil" in the sight of the Lord. This evaluation is not reflective of the well-being of the nation, of the king's success or failure in war, or of the moral climate of the times, but rather the state of cultic worship during his reign. Those kings who shun idolatry and enact religious reforms are singled out for praise, and those who encourage pagan practices are denounced." Savran 1987, p. 146) (Note: "The fight against Baal was initiated by the prophets" Kaufmann 1956a, p. 54) and the criticism of unethical and unjust behaviour of Israelite elites and rulers; (Note: "The immediate occasion of the rise of the new prophecy was the political and social ruin caused by the wars with Israel's northerly neighbour, Aram, which continued for more than a century. They raged intensely during the reign of Ahab, and did not end until the time of Jeroboam II (784–744). While the nation as a whole was impoverished, a few – apparently of the royal officialdom – grew wealthy as a result of the national calamity. Many of the people were compelled to sell their houses and lands, with the result that a sharp social cleavage arose: on the one hand a mass of propertyless indigents, on the other a small circle of the rich. A series of disasters struck the nation – drought, famine, plagues, death and captivity (Amos 4: 6–11), but the greatest disaster of all was the social disintegration due to the cleavage between the poor masses and the wealthy, dissolute upper class. The decay affected both Judah and Israel ... High minded men were appalled at this development. Was this the people whom YHWH had brought out of Egypt, to whom He had given the land and a law of justice and right? it seemed as if the land was about to be inherited by the rich, who would squander its substance in drunken revelry. it was this dissolution that brought the prophetic denunciations to white heat." Kaufmann 1956b, pp. 57–58) (Note: "What manner of man is the prophet? A student of philosophy who runs from the discourses of the great metaphysicians to the orations of the prophets may feel as if he were going from the realm of the sublime to an area of trivialities. Instead of dealing with the timeless issues of being and becoming, of matter and form, of definitions and demonstrations, he is thrown into orations about widows and orphans, about the corruption of judges and affairs of the market place. Instead of showing us a way through the elegant mansions of the mind, the prophets take us to the slums. The world is a proud place, full of beauty, but the prophets are scandalized, and rave as if the whole world were a slum. They make much ado about paltry things, lavishing excessive language upon trifling subjects. What if somewhere in ancient Palestine poor people have not been treated properly by the rich? .... Indeed, the sorts of crimes and even the amount of delinquency that fill the prophets of Israel with dismay do not go beyond that which we regard as normal, as typical ingredients of social dynamics. To us a single act of injustice – cheating in business, exploitation of the poor – is slight; to the prophets, a disaster. To us an injustice is injurious to the welfare of the people; to the prophets it is a deathblow to existence; to us an episode; to them, a catastrophe, a threat to the world." Heschel 2001, pp. 3–4) (Note: "Samuel is thus a work of national self-criticism. It recognizes that Israel would not have survived, either politically or culturally, without the steadying presence of a dynastic royal house. But it makes both that house and its subjects answerable to firm standards of prophetic justice – not those of cult prophets or professional ecstatics, but of morally upright prophetic leaders in the tradition of Moses, Joshua, Deborah, Gideon, and others ..." Rosenberg 1987, p. 141) in which prophets played a crucial and leading role. It ends with the conquest of the Kingdom of Israel by the Neo-Assyrian Empire, followed by the conquest of the Kingdom of Judah by the neo-Babylonian Empire and the destruction of the Temple in Jerusalem.

===== Former Prophets =====
The Former Prophets are the books Joshua, Judges, Samuel and Kings. They contain narratives that begin immediately after the death of Moses with the divine appointment of Joshua as his successor, who then leads the people of Israel into the Promised Land, and end with the release from imprisonment of the last king of Judah. Treating Samuel and Kings as single books, they cover:

- Joshua's conquest of the land of Canaan (in the Book of Joshua),
- the struggle of the people to possess the land (in the Book of Judges),
- the people's request to God to give them a king so that they can occupy the land in the face of their enemies (in the Books of Samuel)
- the possession of the land under the divinely appointed kings of the House of David, ending in conquest and foreign exile (Books of Kings)

===== Latter Prophets =====
The Latter Prophets are Isaiah, Jeremiah, Ezekiel and the Twelve Minor Prophets, counted as a single book.

- Hosea, Hoshea (הושע) denounces the worship of gods other than Yahweh (God), comparing Israel to a woman being unfaithful to her husband.
- Joel, Yo'el (יואל) includes a lament and a promise from God.
- Amos, Amos (עמוס) speaks of social justice, providing a basis for natural law by applying it to unbelievers and believers alike.
- Obadiah, Ovadya (עבדיה) addresses the judgement of Edom and restoration of Israel.
- Jonah, Yona (יונה) tells of a reluctant redemption of Ninevah.
- Micah, Mikha (מיכה) reproaches unjust leaders, defends the rights of the poor, and looks forward to world peace.
- Nahum, Nakhum (נחום) speaks of the destruction of Nineveh.
- Habakkuk, Havakuk (חבקוק) upholds trust in God over Babylon.
- Zephaniah, Tzefanya (צפניה) pronounces coming of judgement, survival and triumph of remnant.
- Haggai, Khagay (חגי) rebuild Second Temple.
- Zechariah, Zekharya (זכריה) God blesses those who repent and are pure.
- Malachi, Malakhi (מלאכי) corrects lax religious and social behaviour.

==== Ketuvim ====
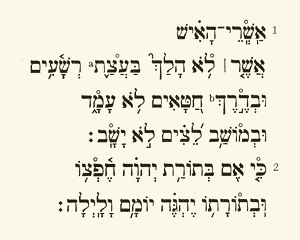
Hebrew text of Psalm 1:1–2

Ketuvim (in Biblical Hebrew: כְּתוּבִים, romanized: Kəṯūḇīm "writings") is the third and final section of the Tanakh. The Ketuvim are believed to have been written under the inspiration of Ruach HaKodesh (the Holy Spirit) but with one level less authority than that of prophecy.

In Masoretic manuscripts (and some printed editions), Psalms, Proverbs and Job are presented in a special two-column form emphasizing their internal parallelism, which was found early in the study of Hebrew poetry. "Stichs" are the lines that make up a verse "the parts of which lie parallel as to form and content". Collectively, these three books are known as Sifrei Emet (an acronym of the titles in Hebrew, איוב, משלי, תהלים yields Emet אמ"ת, which is also the Hebrew for "truth"). Hebrew cantillation is the manner of chanting ritual readings as they are written and notated in the Masoretic Text of the Bible. Psalms, Job and Proverbs form a group with a "special system" of accenting used only in these three books.

===== The five scrolls =====
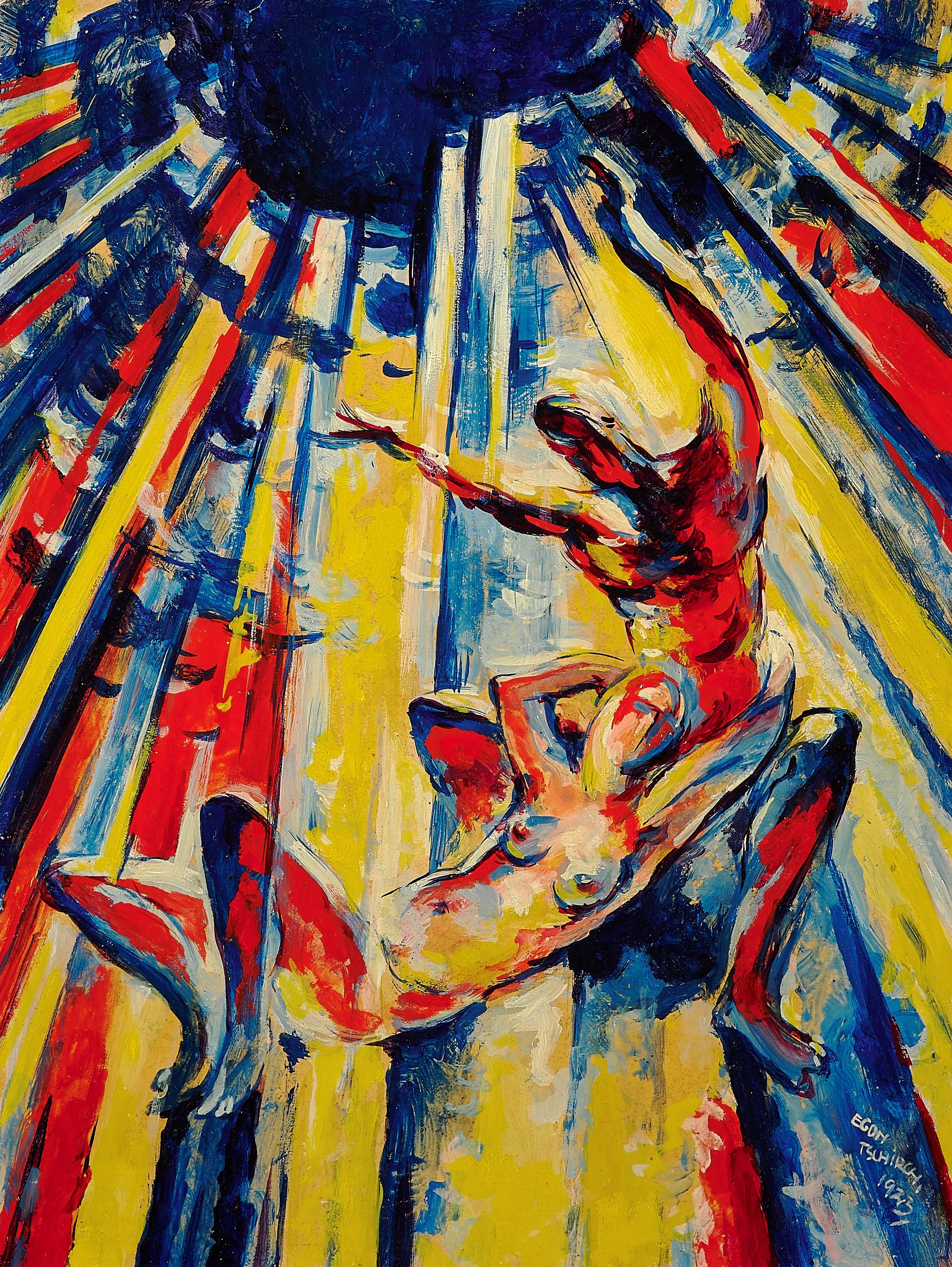
Song of Songs (Das Hohelied Salomos), No. 11 by Egon Tschirch, published in 1923

The five relatively short books of Song of Songs, Book of Ruth, the Book of Lamentations, Ecclesiastes, and Book of Esther are collectively known as the Hamesh Megillot. These are the latest books collected and designated as authoritative in the Jewish canon even though they were not complete until the second century CE.

===== Other books =====
The Isaiah scroll, part of the Dead Sea Scrolls, contains almost the whole Book of Isaiah and dates from the second century BCE.

The books of Esther, Daniel, Ezra-Nehemiah (Note: Originally, Ezra and Nehemiah were one book, which were divided in later traditions.) and Chronicles share a distinctive style that no other Hebrew literary text, biblical or extra-biblical, shares. They were not written in the normal style of Hebrew of the post-exilic period. The authors of these books must have chosen to write in their own distinctive style for unknown reasons.

- Their narratives all openly describe relatively late events (i.e., the Babylonian captivity and the subsequent restoration of Zion).
- The Talmudic tradition ascribes late authorship to all of them.
- Two of them (Daniel and Ezra) are the only books in the Tanakh with significant portions in Aramaic.

===== Book order =====
The following list presents the books of Ketuvim in the order they appear in most current printed editions.

- Tehillim (Psalms) תְהִלִּים is an anthology of individual Hebrew religious hymns.
- Mishlei (Book of Proverbs) מִשְלֵי is a "collection of collections" on values, moral behaviour, the meaning of life and right conduct, and its basis in faith.
- Iyov (Book of Job) אִיּוֹב is about faith, without understanding or justifying suffering.
- Shir ha-Shirim (Song of Songs) or (Song of Solomon) שִׁיר הַשִׁירִים (Passover) is poetry about love and sex.
- Ruth (Book of Ruth) רוּת (Shavuot) tells of the Moabite woman Ruth, who decides to follow the God of the Israelites, and remains loyal to her mother-in-law, who is then rewarded.
- Eikha (Lamentations) איכה (Ninth of Av) [Also called Kinnot in Hebrew.] is a collection of poetic laments for the destruction of Jerusalem in 586 BCE.
- Qoheleth (Ecclesiastes) קהלת (Sukkot) contains wisdom sayings disagreed over by scholars. Is it positive and life-affirming, or deeply pessimistic?
- Ester (Book of Esther) אֶסְתֵר (Purim) tells of a Hebrew woman in Persia who becomes queen and thwarts a genocide of her people.
- Dani’el (Book of Daniel) דָּנִיֵּאל combines prophecy and eschatology (end times) in story of God saving Daniel just as He will save Israel.
- ‘Ezra (Book of Ezra–Book of Nehemiah) עזרא tells of rebuilding the walls of Jerusalem after the Babylonian exile.
- Divrei ha-Yamim (Chronicles) דברי הימים contains genealogy.

The Jewish textual tradition never finalized the order of the books in Ketuvim. The Babylonian Talmud (Bava Batra 14b–15a) gives their order as Ruth, Psalms, Job, Proverbs, Ecclesiastes, Song of Solomon, Lamentations of Jeremiah, Daniel, Scroll of Esther, Ezra, Chronicles.

One of the large scale differences between the Babylonian and the Tiberian biblical traditions is the order of the books. Isaiah is placed after Ezekiel in the Babylonian, while Chronicles opens the Ketuvim in the Tiberian, and closes it in the Babylonian.

The Ketuvim is the last of the three portions of the Tanakh to have been accepted as canonical. While the Torah may have been considered canon by Israel as early as the fifth century BCE and the Former and Latter Prophets were canonized by the second century BCE, the Ketuvim was not a fixed canon until the second century CE.

Evidence suggests, however, that the people of Israel were adding what would become the Ketuvim to their holy literature shortly after the canonization of the prophets. As early as 132 BCE references suggest that the Ketuvim was starting to take shape, although it lacked a formal title. Against Apion, the writing of Josephus in 95 CE, treated the text of the Hebrew Bible as a closed canon to which "... no one has ventured either to add, or to remove, or to alter a syllable..." For an extended period after 95CE, the divine inspiration of Esther, the Song of Songs, and Ecclesiastes was often under scrutiny.

=== Septuagint ===
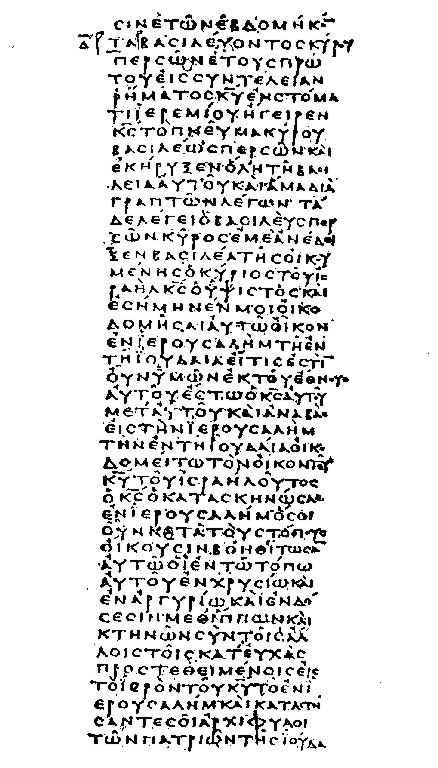
A fragment of a Septuagint: A column of uncial book from 1 Esdras in the Codex Vaticanus c. 325–350 CE, the basis of Sir Lancelot Charles Lee Brenton's Greek edition and English translation

The contents page in a complete 80 book King James Bible, listing "The Books of the Old Testament", "The Books called Apocrypha", and "The Books of the New Testament".

The Septuagint ("the Translation of the Seventy", also called "the LXX"), is a Koine Greek translation of the Hebrew Bible begun in the late third century BCE.

As the work of translation progressed, the Septuagint expanded: the collection of prophetic writings had various hagiographical works incorporated into it. In addition, some newer books such as the Books of the Maccabees and the Wisdom of Sirach were added. These are among the "apocryphal" books, (books whose authenticity is doubted). The inclusion of these texts, and the claim of some mistranslations, contributed to the Septuagint being seen as a "careless" translation and its eventual rejection as a valid Jewish scriptural text. (Note: According to the Jewish Encyclopedia: "The translation, which shows at times a peculiar ignorance of Hebrew usage, was evidently made from a codex which differed widely in places from the text crystallized by the Masorah.")

The apocrypha are Jewish literature, mostly of the Second Temple period (c. 550 BCE – 70 CE); they originated in Israel, Syria, Egypt or Persia; were originally written in Hebrew, Aramaic, or Greek, and attempt to tell of biblical characters and themes. Their provenance is obscure. One older theory of where they came from asserted that an "Alexandrian" canon had been accepted among the Greek-speaking Jews living there, but that theory has since been abandoned. Indications are that they were not accepted when the rest of the Hebrew canon was. It is clear the Apocrypha were used in New Testament times, but "they are never quoted as Scripture." In modern Judaism, none of the apocryphal books are accepted as authentic and are therefore excluded from the canon. However, "the Ethiopian Jews, who are sometimes called Falashas, have an expanded canon, which includes some Apocryphal books".

The rabbis also wanted to distinguish their tradition from the newly emerging tradition of Christianity. (Note: "Two things, however, rendered the Septuagint unwelcome in the long run to the Jews. Its divergence from the accepted text (afterward called the Masoretic) was too evident; and it therefore could not serve as a basis for theological discussion or for homiletic interpretation. This distrust was accentuated by the fact that it had been adopted as Sacred Scripture by the new faith [Christianity] [...] In course of time it came to be the canonical Greek Bible [...] It became part of the Bible of the Christian Church.") Finally, the rabbis claimed a divine authority for the Hebrew language, in contrast to Aramaic or Greek – even though these languages were the lingua franca of Jews during this period (and Aramaic would eventually be given the status of a sacred language comparable to Hebrew). (Note: Mishnah Sotah (7:2–4 and 8:1), among many others, discusses the sacredness of Hebrew, as opposed to Aramaic or Greek. This is comparable to the authority claimed for the original Arabic Koran according to Islamic teaching. As a result of this teaching, translations of the Torah into Koine Greek by early Jewish Rabbis have survived as rare fragments only.)

==== Incorporations from Theodotion ====
The Book of Daniel is preserved in the 12-chapter Masoretic Text and in two longer Greek versions, the original Septuagint version, c. 100 BCE, and the later Theodotion version from c. second century CE. Both Greek texts contain three additions to Daniel: The Prayer of Azariah and Song of the Three Holy Children; the story of Susannah and the Elders; and the story of Bel and the Dragon. Theodotion's translation was so widely copied in the Early Christian church that its version of the Book of Daniel virtually superseded the Septuagint's. The priest Jerome, in his preface to Daniel (407 CE), records the rejection of the Septuagint version of that book in Christian usage: "I ... wish to emphasize to the reader the fact that it was not according to the Septuagint version but according to the version of Theodotion himself that the churches publicly read Daniel." Jerome's preface also mentions that the Hexapla had notations in it, indicating several major differences in content between the Theodotion Daniel and the earlier versions in Greek and Hebrew.

Theodotion's Daniel is closer to the surviving Hebrew Masoretic Text version, the text which is the basis for most modern translations. Theodotion's Daniel is also the one embodied in the authorized edition of the Septuagint published by Sixtus V in 1587.

==== Final form ====
Textual critics are now debating how to reconcile the earlier view of the Septuagint as 'careless' with content from the Dead Sea Scrolls at Qumran, scrolls discovered at Wadi Murabba'at, Nahal Hever, and those discovered at Masada. These scrolls are 1000–1300 years older than the Leningrad text, dated to 1008 CE, which forms the basis of the Masoretic text. The scrolls have confirmed much of the Masoretic text, but they have also differed from it, and many of those differences agree with the Septuagint, the Samaritan Pentateuch or the Greek Old Testament instead.

Copies of some texts later declared apocryphal are also among the Qumran texts. Ancient manuscripts of the book of Sirach, the "Psalms of Joshua", Tobit, and the Epistle of Jeremiah are now known to have existed in a Hebrew version. The Septuagint version of some biblical books, such as the Book of Daniel and Book of Esther, are longer than those in the Jewish canon. In the Septuagint, Jeremiah is shorter than in the Masoretic text, but a shortened Hebrew Jeremiah has been found at Qumran in cave 4. The scrolls of Isaiah, Exodus, Jeremiah, Daniel and Samuel exhibit striking and important textual variants from the Masoretic text. The Septuagint is now seen as a careful translation of a different Hebrew form or recension (revised addition of the text) of certain books, but debate on how best to characterize these varied texts is ongoing.

=== Pseudepigraphal books ===
Pseudepigrapha are works whose authorship is wrongly attributed. A written work can be pseudepigraphical and not be a forgery, as forgeries are intentionally deceptive. With pseudepigrapha, authorship has been mistransmitted for any one of a number of reasons. For example, the Gospel of Barnabas claims to be written by Barnabas the companion of the Apostle Paul, but both its manuscripts date from the Middle Ages.

Apocryphal and pseudepigraphic works are not the same. Apocrypha includes all the writings claiming to be sacred that are outside the canon because they are not accepted as authentically being what they claim to be. Pseudepigrapha is a literary category of all writings, whether they are canonical or apocryphal. They may or may not be authentic in every sense except for a misunderstood authorship.

Numerous works of Jewish religious literature written from about 300 BCE to 300 CE have been described as pseudepigraphical; however, not all of them are (it also refers to books of the New Testament canon whose authorship is questioned.) The Old Testament pseudepigraphal works include the following:

- 3 Maccabees
- 4 Maccabees
- Assumption of Moses
- Ethiopic Book of Enoch (1 Enoch)
- Slavonic Book of Enoch (2 Enoch)
- Hebrew Book of Enoch (3 Enoch) (also known as "The Revelation of Metatron" or "The Book of Rabbi Ishmael the High Priest")
- Book of Jubilees
- Syriac Apocalypse of Baruch (2 Baruch)
- Letter of Aristeas (Letter to Philocrates regarding the translation of the Hebrew scriptures into Greek)
- Life of Adam and Eve
- Martyrdom and Ascension of Isaiah
- Psalms of Solomon
- Sibylline Oracles
- Greek Apocalypse of Baruch (3 Baruch)
- Testaments of the Twelve Patriarchs

==== Book of Enoch ====
Notable pseudepigraphal works include the Books of Enoch such as 1 Enoch, 2 Enoch, which survives only in Old Slavonic, and 3 Enoch, surviving in Hebrew of the c. fifth century – c. sixth century CE. These are ancient Jewish religious works, traditionally ascribed to the prophet Enoch, the great-grandfather of the patriarch Noah. The fragment of Enoch found among the Qumran scrolls attests to it being an ancient work. The older sections (mainly in the Book of the Watchers) are estimated to date from about 300 BCE, and the latest part (Book of Parables) was probably composed at the end of the first century BCE.

Enoch is not part of the biblical canon used by most Jews, apart from Beta Israel. Most Christian denominations and traditions may accept the Books of Enoch as having some historical or theological interest or significance. Part of the Book of Enoch is quoted in the Epistle of Jude and the Book of Hebrews (parts of the New Testament), but Christian denominations generally regard the Books of Enoch as non-canonical. The exceptions to this view are the Ethiopian Orthodox Tewahedo Church and Eritrean Orthodox Tewahedo Church.

The Ethiopian Bible is not based on the Greek Bible, and the Ethiopian Church has a slightly different understanding of canon than other Christian traditions. In Ethiopia, canon does not have the same degree of fixedness (yet neither is it completely open). Enoch has long been seen there as inspired scripture, but being scriptural and being canon are not always seen the same. The official Ethiopian canon has 81 books, but that number is reached in different ways with various lists of different books, and the book of Enoch is sometimes included and sometimes not. Current evidence confirms Enoch as canonical in both Ethiopia and in Eritrea.

=== Christian Bible ===
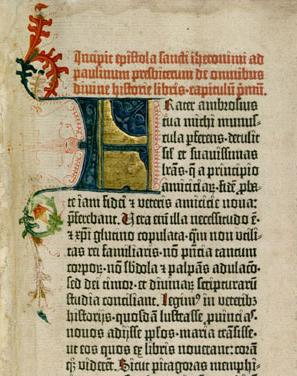
A page from the Gutenberg Bible

The Christian Bible is a set of books divided into the Old and New Testament that a Christian denomination has, at some point in their past or present, regarded as divinely inspired scripture by the Holy Spirit. The Early Church primarily used the Septuagint, as it was written in Greek, the common tongue of the day, or they used the Targums among Aramaic speakers. Modern English translations of the Old Testament section of the Christian Bible are based on the Masoretic Text. The Pauline epistles and the gospels were soon added, along with other writings, as the New Testament.

==== Old Testament ====
The Old Testament has been important to the life of the Christian church from its earliest days. Bible scholar N. T. Wright says "Jesus himself was profoundly shaped by the scriptures." Wright adds that the earliest Christians searched those same Hebrew scriptures in their effort to understand the earthly life of Jesus. They regarded the "holy writings" of the Israelites as necessary and instructive for the Christian, as seen from Paul's words to Timothy (2 Timothy 3:15), as pointing to the Messiah, and as having reached a climactic fulfilment in Jesus generating the "new covenant" prophesied by Jeremiah.

The Protestant Old Testament of the 21st century has a 39-book canon. The number of books (although not the content) varies from the Jewish Tanakh only because of a different method of division. The term "Hebrew scriptures" is often used as being synonymous with the Protestant Old Testament, since the surviving scriptures in Hebrew include only those books.

However, the Roman Catholic Church recognizes 46 books as its Old Testament (45 if Jeremiah and Lamentations are counted as one), and the Eastern Orthodox Churches recognize six additional books. These additions are also included in the Syriac versions of the Bible called the Peshitta and the Ethiopian Bible. (Note: Even though they were not placed on the same level as the canonical books, still they were useful for instruction. ... These – and others that total fourteen or fifteen altogether – are the books known as the Apocrypha. Williams 1970, p. 141) (Note: "English Bibles were patterned after those of the Continental Reformers by having the Apocrypha set off from the rest of the OT. Coverdale (1535) called them "Apocrypha". All English Bibles prior to 1629 contained the Apocrypha. Matthew's Bible (1537), the Great Bible (1539), the Geneva Bible (1560), the Bishop's Bible (1568), and the King James Bible (1611) contained the Apocrypha. Soon after the publication of the KJV, however, the English Bibles began to drop the Apocrypha and eventually they disappeared entirely. The first English Bible to be printed in America (1782–83) lacked the Apocrypha. In 1826 the British and Foreign Bible Society decided to no longer print them. Today the trend is in the opposite direction, and English Bibles with the Apocrypha are becoming more popular again." Ewert 2010, p. 104) (Note: "Fourteen books and parts of books are considered Apocryphal by Protestants. Three of these are recognized by Roman Catholics also as Apocryphal."Wells 1911, p. 41)

Because the canon of Scripture is distinct for Jews, Eastern Orthodox, Roman Catholics, and Western Protestants, the contents of each community's Apocrypha are unique, as is its usage of the term. For Jews, none of the apocryphal books are considered canonical. Catholics refer to this collection as "Deuterocanonical books" (second canon) and the Orthodox Church refers to them as "Anagignoskomena" (that which is read). (Note: the Canon of Trent: But if anyone receive not, as sacred and canonical, the said books entire with all their parts, as they have been used to be read in the Catholic Church, and as they are contained in the old Latin vulgate edition; and knowingly and deliberately contemn the traditions aforesaid; let him be anathema. — Decretum de Canonicis Scripturis, Council of Trent, 8 April 1546)

Books included in the Catholic, Orthodox, Greek, and Slavonic Bibles are: Tobit, Judith, the Wisdom of Solomon, Sirach (or Ecclesiasticus), Baruch, the Letter of Jeremiah (also called the Baruch Chapter 6), 1 Maccabees, 2 Maccabees, the Greek Additions to Esther and the Greek Additions to Daniel.

The Greek Orthodox Church, and the Slavonic churches (Belarus, Bosnia and Herzegovina, Bulgaria, North Macedonia, Montenegro, Poland, Ukraine, Russia, Serbia, the Czech Republic, Slovakia, Slovenia and Croatia) also add:

- 3 Maccabees
- 1 Esdras
- Prayer of Manasseh
- Psalm 151

2 Esdras (4 Esdras), which is not included in the Septuagint, does not exist in Greek, though it does exist in Latin. There is also 4 Maccabees which is only accepted as canonical in the Georgian Church. It is in an appendix to the Greek Orthodox Bible, and it is therefore sometimes included in collections of the Apocrypha.

The Syriac Orthodox Church also includes:

- Psalms 151–155
- The Apocalypse of Baruch
- The Letter of Baruch

The Ethiopian Old Testament Canon uses Enoch and Jubilees (that only survived in Ge'ez), 1–3 Meqabyan, Greek Ezra, 2 Esdras, and Psalm 151.

The Revised Common Lectionary of the Lutheran Church, Moravian Church, Reformed Churches, Anglican Church and Methodist Church uses the apocryphal books liturgically, with alternative Old Testament readings available. (Note: "In all places where a reading from the deuterocanonical books (The Apocrypha) is listed, an alternate reading from the canonical Scriptures has also been provided.") Therefore, editions of the Bible intended for use in the Lutheran Church and Anglican Church include the fourteen books of the Apocrypha, many of which are the deuterocanonical books accepted by the Catholic Church, plus 1 Esdras, 2 Esdras and the Prayer of Manasseh, which were in the Vulgate appendix.

The Roman Catholic and Eastern Orthodox Churches use most of the books of the Septuagint, while Protestant churches usually do not. After the Protestant Reformation, many Protestant Bibles began to follow the Jewish canon and exclude the additional texts, which came to be called apocryphal. The Apocrypha are included under a separate heading in the King James Version of the Bible, the basis for the Revised Standard Version.

The Orthodox; Old Testament (Note: The canon of the original Old Greek LXX is disputed. This table reflects the canon of the Old Testament as used currently in Orthodoxy.)	Greek-based name	Conventional; English name
Law
Γένεσις	Génesis	Genesis
Ἔξοδος	Éxodos	Exodus
Λευϊτικόν	Leuitikón	Leviticus
Ἀριθμοί	Arithmoí	Numbers
Δευτερονόμιον	Deuteronómion	Deuteronomy
History
Ἰησοῦς Nαυῆ	Iêsous Nauê	Joshua
Κριταί	Kritaí	Judges
Ῥούθ	Roúth	Ruth
Βασιλειῶν Αʹ (Note: Βασιλειῶν (Basileiōn) is the genitive plural of Βασιλεῖα (Basileia).)	I Basileiōn	I Samuel
Βασιλειῶν Βʹ	II Basileiōn	II Samuel
Βασιλειῶν Γʹ	III Basileiōn	I Kings
Βασιλειῶν Δʹ	IV Basileiōn	II Kings
Παραλειπομένων Αʹ	I Paraleipomenon (Note: That is, Things set aside from Ἔσδρας Αʹ.)	I Chronicles
Παραλειπομένων Βʹ	II Paraleipomenon	II Chronicles
Ἔσδρας Αʹ	I Esdras	1 Esdras
Ἔσδρας Βʹ	II Esdras	Ezra–Nehemiah
Τωβίτ (Note: Also called Τωβείτ or Τωβίθ in some sources.)	Tōbit	Tobit or Tobias
Ἰουδίθ	Ioudith	Judith
Ἐσθήρ	Esther	Esther with additions
Μακκαβαίων Αʹ	I Makkabaion	1 Maccabees
Μακκαβαίων Βʹ	II Makkabaion	2 Maccabees
Μακκαβαίων Γʹ	III Makkabaion	3 Maccabees
Wisdom
Ψαλμοί	Psalmoi	Psalms
Ψαλμός ΡΝΑʹ	Psalmos 151	Psalm 151
Προσευχὴ Μανάσση	Proseuchē Manassē	Prayer of Manasseh
Ἰώβ	Iōb	Job
Παροιμίαι	Paroimiai	Proverbs
Ἐκκλησιαστής	Ekklēsiastēs	Ecclesiastes
Ἆσμα Ἀσμάτων	Asma Asmatōn	Song of Solomon or Canticles
Σοφία Σαλoμῶντος	Sophia Salomōntos	Wisdom or Wisdom of Solomon
Σοφία Ἰησοῦ Σειράχ	Sophia Iēsou Seirach	Sirach or Ecclesiasticus or Wisdom of Sirach
Ψαλμοί Σαλoμῶντος	Psalmoi Salomōntos	Psalms of Solomon (Note: Not in Orthodox Canon, but originally included in the Septuagint.)
Prophets
Δώδεκα	Dōdeka (The Twelve)	Minor Prophets
Ὡσηέ Αʹ	I Osëe	Hosea
Ἀμώς Βʹ	II Amōs	Amos
Μιχαίας Γʹ	III Michaias	Micah
Ἰωήλ Δʹ	IV Ioël	Joel
Ὀβδίου Εʹ (Note: Obdiou is genitive from "The vision of Obdias", which opens the book.)	V Obdiou	Obadiah
Ἰωνᾶς Ϛ'	VI Ionas	Jonah
Ναούμ Ζʹ	VII Naoum	Nahum
Ἀμβακούμ Ηʹ	VIII Ambakoum	Habakkuk
Σοφονίας Θʹ	IX Sophonias	Zephaniah
Ἀγγαῖος Ιʹ	X Angaios	Haggai
Ζαχαρίας ΙΑʹ	XI Zacharias	Zachariah
Μαλαχίας ΙΒʹ	XII Malachias	Malachi
Ἠσαΐας	Ēsaias	Isaiah
Ἱερεμίας	Hieremias	Jeremiah
Βαρούχ	Barouch	Baruch
Θρῆνοι	Thrēnoi	Lamentations
Ἐπιστολή Ιερεμίου	Epistolē Ieremiou	Letter of Jeremiah
Ἰεζεκιήλ	Iezekiêl	Ezekiel
Δανιήλ	Daniêl	Daniel with additions
Appendix
Μακκαβαίων Δ' Παράρτημα	IV Makkabaiōn Parartēma	4 Maccabees (Note: Originally placed after 3 Maccabees and before Psalms, but placed in an appendix of the Orthodox Canon.)

==== New Testament ====
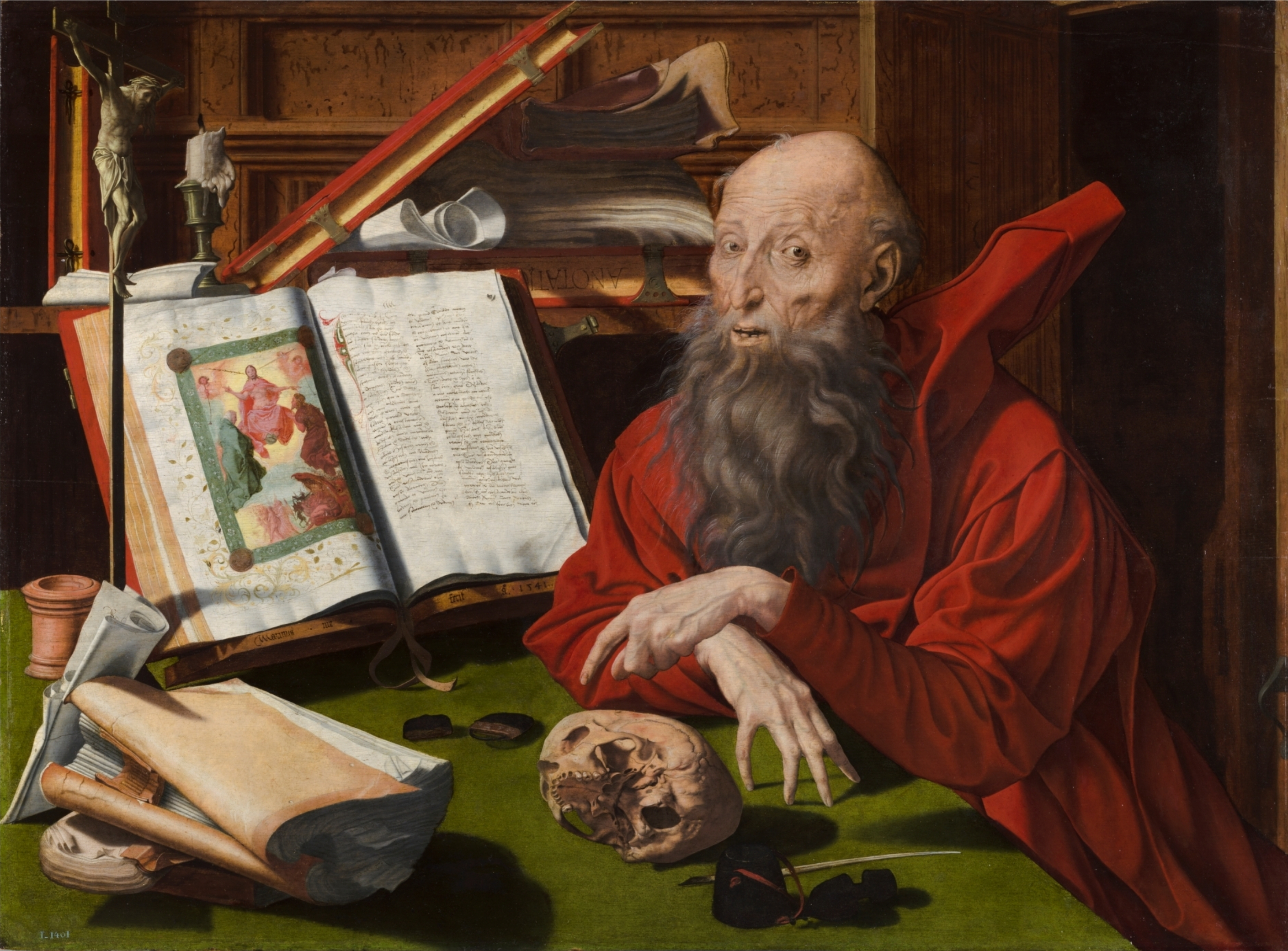
St. Jerome in His Study, published in 1541 by Marinus van Reymerswaele. Jerome produced a fourth-century Latin edition of the Bible, known as the Vulgate, that became the Catholic Church's official translation.

The New Testament is the name given to the second portion of the Christian Bible. While some scholars assert that Aramaic was the original language of the New Testament, the majority view says it was written in the vernacular form of Koine Greek. Still, there is reason to assert that it is a heavily Semitized Greek: its syntax is like conversational Greek, but its style is largely Semitic. (Note: "The New Testament was written in Koine Greek, the Greek of daily conversation. The fact that from the first all the New Testament writings were written in Greek is conclusively demonstrated by their citations from the Old Testament ..." Aland & Aland 1995, p. 52) (Note: "How came the twenty-seven books of the New Testament to be gathered together and made authoritative Christian scripture? 1. All the New Testament books were originally written in Greek. On the face of it this may surprise us." Hunter 1972, p. 9) Koine Greek was the common language of the western Roman Empire from the Conquests of Alexander the Great (335–323 BCE) until the evolution of Byzantine Greek (c. 600) while Aramaic was the language of Jesus, the Apostles and the ancient Near East. (Note: "This is the language of the New Testament. By the time of Jesus the Romans had become the dominant military and political force, but the Greek language remained the 'common language' of the eastern Mediterranean and beyond, and Greek ..." Duff & Wenham 2005, p. xxv) (Note: "By far the most predominant element in the language of the New Testament is the Greek of common speech which was disseminated in the East by the Macedonian conquest, in the form which it had gradually assumed under the wider development ..." Blass & Thackeray 2008, p. 2) (Note: "In this short overview of the Greek language of the New Testament we will focus on those topics that are of greatest importance for the average reader, that is, those with important ..." Aune 2010, p. 61) The term "New Testament" came into use in the second century during a controversy over whether the Hebrew Bible should be included with the Christian writings as sacred scripture.

It is generally accepted that the New Testament writers were Jews who took the inspiration of the Old Testament for granted. This is probably stated earliest in 2 Timothy 3:16: "All scripture is given by inspiration of God". Scholarship on how and why ancient Jewish–Christians came to create and accept new texts as equal to the established Hebrew texts has taken three forms. First, priest and biblical scholar John Barton writes that ancient Christians probably just continued the Jewish tradition of writing and incorporating what they believed were inspired, authoritative religious books. The second approach separates those various inspired writings based on a concept of "canon" which developed in the second century. The third involves formalizing canon. According to Barton, these differences are only differences in terminology; the ideas are reconciled if they are seen as three stages in the formation of the New Testament.

The first stage was completed remarkably early if one accepts Albert C. Sundberg's view that "canon" and "scripture" are separate things, with "scripture" having been recognized by ancient Christians long before "canon" was. Barton says Theodor Zahn concluded "there was already a Christian canon by the end of the first century", but this is not the canon of later centuries. Accordingly, Sundberg asserts that in the first centuries, there was no criterion for inclusion in the "sacred writings" beyond inspiration, and that no one in the first century had the idea of a closed canon. The gospels were accepted by early believers as handed down from those Apostles who had known Jesus and been taught by him. Later biblical criticism has questioned the authorship and dating of the gospels.

At the end of the second century, it is widely recognized that a Christian canon similar to its modern version was asserted by the church fathers in response to the plethora of writings claiming inspiration that contradicted orthodoxy: (heresy). The third stage of development as the final canon occurred in the fourth century with a series of synods that produced a list of texts of the canon of the Old Testament and the New Testament that are still used today. Most notably the Synod of Hippo in 393 CE and that of c. 400. Jerome produced a definitive Latin edition of the Bible (the Vulgate), the canon of which, at the insistence of the Pope, was in accord with the earlier Synods. This process effectively set the New Testament canon.

New Testament books already had considerable authority in the late first and early second centuries. Even in its formative period, most of the books of the New Testament that were seen as scripture were already agreed upon. Linguistics scholar Stanley E. Porter says "evidence from the apocryphal non-Gospel literature is the same as that for the apocryphal Gospels – in other words, that the text of the Greek New Testament was relatively well established and fixed by the time of the second and third centuries". By the time the fourth century Fathers were approving the "canon", they were doing little more than codifying what was already universally accepted.

The New Testament is a collection of 27 books of 4 different genres of Christian literature (Gospels, one account of the Acts of the Apostles, Epistles and an Apocalypse). These books can be grouped into:

The Gospels are narratives of Jesus's last three years of life, his death and resurrection.

- Synoptic Gospels
  - Gospel of Matthew
  - Gospel of Mark
  - Gospel of Luke
- Gospel of John

The narrative literature provides an account and history of the very early Apostolic age.

- Acts of the Apostles

The Pauline epistles are written to individual church groups to address problems, provide encouragement and give instruction.

- Epistle to the Romans
- First Epistle to the Corinthians
- Second Epistle to the Corinthians
- Epistle to the Galatians
- Epistle to the Ephesians
- Epistle to the Philippians
- Epistle to the Colossians
- First Epistle to the Thessalonians
- Second Epistle to the Thessalonians

The pastoral epistles discuss the pastoral oversight of churches, Christian living, doctrine and leadership.

- First Epistle to Timothy
- Second Epistle to Timothy
- Epistle to Titus
- Epistle to Philemon
- Epistle to the Hebrews

The Catholic epistles, also called the general epistles or lesser epistles.

- Epistle of James encourages a lifestyle consistent with faith.
- First Epistle of Peter addresses trial and suffering.
- Second Epistle of Peter more on suffering's purposes, Christology, ethics and eschatology.
- First Epistle of John covers how to discern true Christians: by their ethics, their proclamation of Jesus in the flesh, and by their love.
- Second Epistle of John warns against docetism.
- Third Epistle of John encourage, strengthen and warn.
- Epistle of Jude condemns opponents.

The apocalyptic literature (prophetical)

- Book of Revelation, or the Apocalypse, predicts end time events.

Catholicism, Protestantism, and Eastern Orthodox currently have the same 27-book New Testament Canon. They are ordered differently in the Slavonic tradition, the Syriac tradition and the Ethiopian tradition.

==== Canon variations ====
===== Peshitta =====
The Peshitta (Classical Syriac: ܦܫܺܝܛܬܳܐ or ܦܫܝܼܛܬܵܐ pšīṭtā) is the standard version of the Bible for churches in the Syriac tradition. The consensus within biblical scholarship, although not universal, is that the Old Testament of the Peshitta was translated into Syriac from biblical Hebrew, probably in the 2nd century CE, and that the New Testament of the Peshitta was translated from the Greek. (Note: "The Peshitta Old Testament was translated directly from the original Hebrew text, and the Peshitta New Testament directly from the original Greek" Brock 1988, p. 13) This New Testament, originally excluding certain disputed books (2 Peter, 2 John, 3 John, Jude, Revelation), had become a standard by the early 5th century. The five excluded books were added in the Harklean Version (616 CE) of Thomas of Harqel. (Note: "Printed editions of the Peshitta frequently contain these books in order to fill the gaps. D. Harklean Version. The Harklean version is connected with the labours of Thomas of Harqel. When thousands were fleeing Khosrou's invading armies, ..." Bromiley 1995, p. 976)

===== Catholic Church canon =====
The canon of the Catholic Church was affirmed by the Council of Rome (382), the Synod of Hippo (393), the Council of Carthage (397), the Council of Carthage (419), the Council of Florence (1431–1449) and finally, as an article of faith, by the Council of Trent (1545–1563) establishing the canon consisting of 46 books in the Old Testament and 27 books in the New Testament for a total of 73 books in the Catholic Bible. (Note: The Council of Trent confirmed the identical list/canon of sacred scriptures already anciently approved by the Synod of Hippo (Synod of 393), Council of Carthage, 28 August 397, and Council of Florence, 4 February 1442; – Bull of Union with the Copts seventh paragraph down.)

===== Ethiopian Orthodox canon =====
The canon of the Ethiopian Orthodox Tewahedo Church is wider than the canons used by most other Christian churches. There are 81 books in the Ethiopian Orthodox Bible. In addition to the books found in the Septuagint accepted by other Orthodox Christians, the Ethiopian Old Testament Canon uses Enoch and Jubilees (ancient Jewish books that only survived in Ge'ez, but are quoted in the New Testament), Greek Ezra and the Apocalypse of Ezra, 3 books of Meqabyan, and Psalm 151 at the end of the Psalter. The three books of Meqabyan are not to be confused with the books of Maccabees. The order of the books is somewhat different in that the Ethiopian Old Testament follows the Septuagint order for the Minor Prophets rather than the Jewish order.

=== New Testament Apocryphal books ===
The New Testament apocrypha are a number of writings by early professed Christians that give accounts of Jesus and his teachings, the nature of God, or the teachings of his Apostles and of their activities. Some of these writings were cited as Scripture by some early Christians, but since the fifth century a widespread consensus emerged limiting the New Testament to the 27 books of the modern canon. Roman Catholic, Eastern Orthodox, and Western Protestant churches do not view the New Testament apocrypha as part of the inspired Bible. Although some Oriental Orthodox canons to some extent have. The Armenian Apostolic church at times has included the Third Epistle to the Corinthians, but does not always list it with the other 27 canonical New Testament books. The New Testament of the Coptic Bible, adopted by the Egyptian Church, includes the two Epistles of Clement.

== Textual history ==
The original autographs, that is, the original Greek writings and manuscripts written by the original authors of the New Testament, have not survived. But, historically, copies of those original autographs exist and were transmitted and preserved in a number of manuscript traditions. The three main textual traditions of the Greek New Testament are sometimes called the Alexandrian text-type (generally minimalist), the Byzantine text-type (generally maximalist), and the Western text-type (occasionally wild). Together they comprise most of the ancient manuscripts. Very early on, Christianity replaced scrolls with codexes, the forerunner of bound books, and by the 3rd century, collections of biblical books began being copied as a set.

Since all ancient texts were written by hand, often by copying from another handwritten text, they are not exactly alike in the manner of printed works. The differences between them are considered generally minor and are called textual variants. A variant is simply any variation between two texts. The majority of variants are accidental, but some are intentional. Intentional changes were made to improve grammar, to eliminate discrepancies, to make Liturgical changes such as the doxology of the Lord's prayer, to harmonize parallel passages or to combine and simplify multiple variant readings into one.

== Influence ==
With a literary tradition spanning two millennia, the Bible is one of the most influential works ever written. From practices of personal hygiene to philosophy and ethics, the Bible has directly and indirectly influenced politics and law, war and peace, sexual morals, marriage and family life, letters and learning, the arts, economics, social justice, medical care and more.

The Christian Bible is the world's most published book, with estimated total sales of over five billion copies. As such, the Bible has had a profound influence, especially in the Western world, where the Gutenberg Bible was the first book printed in Europe using movable type. It has contributed to the formation of Western law, art, literature, and education.

=== Politics and law ===
The Bible has been used to support and oppose political power. According to French philosopher Jacques Ellul, it has inspired revolution and "a reversal of power" because God is so often portrayed as choosing what is "weak and humble ... (the stammering Moses, the infant Samuel, Saul from an insignificant family, David confronting Goliath, etc.) ... to confound the mighty". Biblical texts have been the catalyst for political concepts like democracy, religious toleration and religious freedom. These have, in turn, inspired movements ranging from abolitionism in the 18th and 19th century, to the civil rights movement, the Anti-Apartheid Movement, and liberation theology in Latin America. The Bible has been the source of many peace movements and efforts at reconciliation around the world.

The roots of many modern laws can be found in the Bible's teachings on due process, fairness in criminal procedures, and equity in the application of the law. Judges are told not to accept bribes (Deuteronomy 16:19), are required to be impartial to native and stranger alike (Leviticus 24:22; Deuteronomy 27:19), to the needy and the powerful alike (Leviticus 19:15), and to rich and poor alike (Deuteronomy 1:16, 17; Exodus 23:2–6). The right to a fair trial, and fair punishment, is also found in the Bible (Deuteronomy 19:15; Exodus 21:23–25). Those most vulnerable in a patriarchal society – children, women, and strangers – are singled out in the Bible for special protection (Psalm 72:2, 4).

The Bible has been noted by scholars as a significant influence on the development of nationhood and nationalism, first among ancient Jews and later in Christian societies. For the ancient Jews, it served as "both a national history and a source of law", providing a framework that established shared ancestry, common history, legal codes, and cultural markers that defined Jewish collective identity. It has been suggested that the practice of regular public readings of biblical texts during the Second Temple period facilitated the transmission of these identity-forming narratives across the wider Jewish public. Several scholars argue that substantial portions of the Hebrew Bible—particularly the Deuteronomistic History and the Tetrateuch—were composed specifically to establish and reinforce a distinct Israelite ethnic and national identity. Some scholars of nationalism, such as Adrian Hastings, contend that the model of ancient Israel presented in the Hebrew Bible provided the world with the original concept of nationhood, influencing the development of nationalism and European nation-states.

=== Social responsibility ===
The prophets of the Hebrew Bible repeatedly admonish the people to practice justice, charity, and social responsibility. H. A. Lockton writes that "The Poverty and Justice Bible (The Bible Society (UK), 2008) claims there are more than 2000 verses in the Bible dealing with the justice issues of rich-poor relations, exploitation and oppression". Judaism practised charity and healing the sick but tended to limit these practices to their own people. For Christians, the Old Testament statements are enhanced by multiple verses such as Matthew 10:8, Luke 10:9 and 9:2, and Acts 5:16 that say "heal the sick". Authors Vern and Bonnie Bullough write in The care of the sick: the emergence of modern nursing, that this is seen as an aspect of following Jesus's example, since so much of his public ministry focused on healing.

In the process of following this command, monasticism in the third century transformed health care. This produced the first hospital for the poor in Caesarea in the fourth century. The monastic health care system was innovative in its methods, allowing the sick to remain within the monastery as a special class afforded special benefits; it destigmatized illness, legitimized the deviance from the norm that sickness includes, and formed the basis for future modern concepts of public health care. The biblical practices of feeding and clothing the poor, visiting prisoners, supporting widows and orphan children have had sweeping impact.

The Bible's emphasis on learning has had formidable influence on believers and western society. For centuries after the fall of the western Roman Empire, all schools in Europe were Bible-based church schools, and outside of monastic settlements, almost no one had the ability to read or write. These schools eventually led to the West's first universities (created by the church) in the Middle Ages which have spread around the world in the modern day. Protestant Reformers wanted all members of the church to be able to read the Bible, so compulsory education for both boys and girls was introduced. Translations of the Bible into local vernacular languages have supported the development of national literatures and the invention of alphabets.

Biblical teachings on sexual morality changed the Roman empire, the millennium that followed, and have continued to influence society. Rome's concept of sexual morality was centred on social and political status, power, and social reproduction (the transmission of social inequality to the next generation). The biblical standard was a "radical notion of individual freedom centered around a libertarian paradigm of complete sexual agency". Classicist Kyle Harper describes the change biblical teaching evoked as "a revolution in the rules of behavior, but also in the very image of the human being".

=== Literature and the arts ===
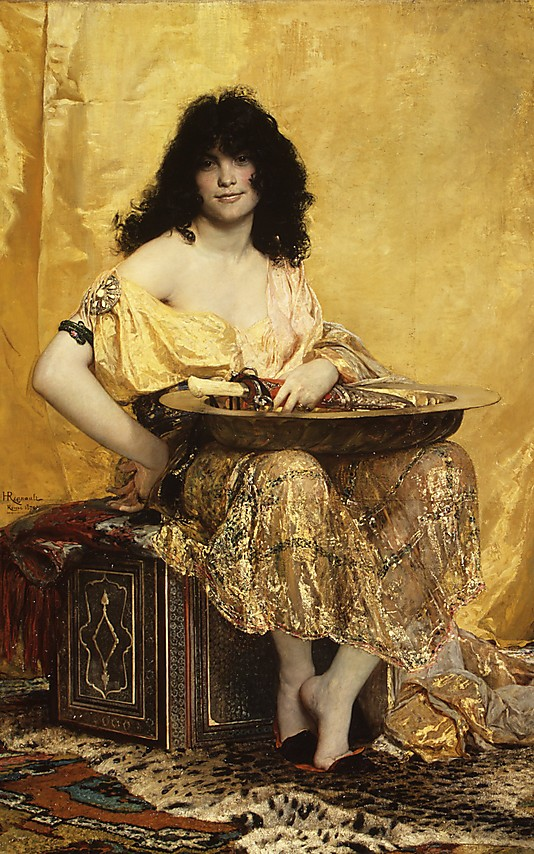
Salomé, by Henri Regnault (1870)

The Bible has directly and indirectly influenced literature: St Augustine's Confessions is widely considered the first autobiography in Western Literature. The Summa Theologica, written 1265–1274, is "one of the classics of the history of philosophy and one of the most influential works of Western literature." These both influenced the writings of Dante's epic poetry and his Divine Comedy, and in turn, Dante's creation and sacramental theology has contributed to influencing writers such as J. R. R. Tolkien and William Shakespeare.

Many masterpieces of Western art were inspired by biblical themes: from Michelangelo's David and Pietà sculptures, to Leonardo da Vinci's Last Supper and Raphael's various Madonna paintings. There are hundreds of examples. Eve, the temptress who disobeys God's commandment, is probably the most widely portrayed figure in art. The Renaissance preferred the sensuous female nude, while the "femme fatale" Delilah from the nineteenth century onward demonstrates how the Bible and art both shape and reflect views of women.

The Bible has many rituals of purification which speak of clean and unclean in both literal and metaphorical terms. The biblical toilet etiquette encourages washing after all instances of defecation, hence the invention of the bidet.

=== Criticism ===
Critics view certain biblical texts to be morally problematic. The Bible neither calls for nor condemns slavery outright, but there are verses that address dealing with it, and these verses have been used to support it, although the Bible has also been used to support abolitionism. Some have written that supersessionism begins in the book of Hebrews where others locate its beginnings in the culture of the fourth century Roman empire. The Bible has been used to support the death penalty, patriarchy, sexual intolerance, the violence of total war, and colonialism.

In the Christian Bible, the violence of war is addressed four ways: pacifism, non-resistance; just war, and preventive war which is sometimes called crusade. In the Hebrew Bible, there is just war and preventive war which includes the Amalekites, Canaanites, Moabites, and the record in Exodus, Deuteronomy, Joshua, and both books of Kings. John J. Collins, biblical scholar, writes that people throughout history have used these biblical texts to justify violence against their enemies. Anthropologist Leonard B. Glick offers the modern example of Jewish fundamentalists in Israel, such as Shlomo Aviner, a rabbi and prominent theorist of the Gush Emunim movement, who considers the Palestinians to be like biblical Canaanites, and therefore suggests that Israel "must be prepared to destroy" the Palestinians if the Palestinians do not leave the land.

Historian Nur Masalha argues that genocide is inherent in these commandments, and that they have served as inspirational examples of divine support for slaughtering national opponents. However, the "applicability of the term [genocide] to earlier periods of history" is questioned by sociologists Frank Robert Chalk and Kurt Jonassohn. Since most societies of the past endured and practised genocide, it was accepted at that time as "being in the nature of life" because of the "coarseness and brutality" of life; the moral condemnation associated with terms like genocide are products of modern morality. The definition of what constitutes violence has broadened considerably over time. The Bible reflects how perceptions of violence changed for its authors.

Feminist biblical scholar Phyllis Trible, in her book Texts of Terror, tells four Bible stories of suffering in ancient Israel where women are the victims. Tribble describes the Bible as "a mirror" that reflects humans, and human life, in all its "holiness and horror".

John Riches, professor of divinity and biblical criticism at the University of Glasgow, provides the following view of the diverse historical influences of the Bible:

It has inspired some of the great monuments of human thought, literature, and art; it has equally fuelled some of the worst excesses of human savagery, self-interest, and narrow-mindedness. It has inspired men and women to acts of great service and courage, to fight for liberation and human development; and it has provided the ideological fuel for societies which have enslaved their fellow human beings and reduced them to abject poverty. ... It has, perhaps above all, provided a source of religious and moral norms which have enabled communities to hold together, to care for, and to protect one another; yet precisely this strong sense of belonging has in turn fuelled ethnic, racial, and international tension and conflict. It has, that is to say, been the source of great truth, goodness, and beauty at the same time as it has inspired lies, wickedness, and ugliness.

== Interpretation and inspiration ==
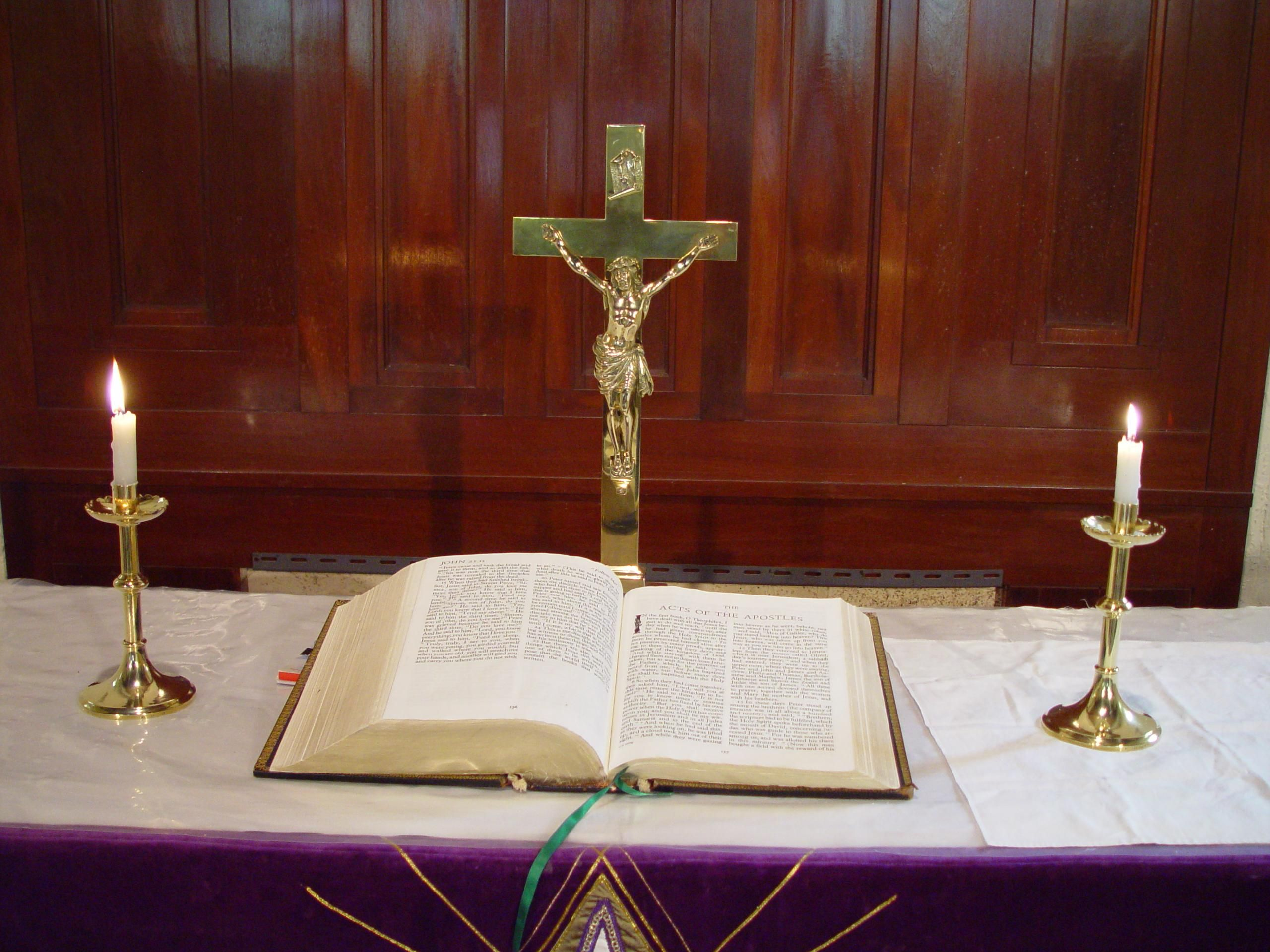
A Bible is placed centrally on a Lutheran altar, highlighting its importance

Biblical texts have always required interpretation, and this has given rise to multiple views and approaches according to the interplay between various religions and the book.

The primary source of Jewish commentary and interpretation of the Hebrew Bible is the Talmud. The Talmud, (which means study and learning), is a summary of ancient oral law and commentary on it. It is the primary source of Jewish Law. Adin Steinsaltz writes that "if the Bible is the cornerstone of Judaism, then the Talmud is the central pillar". Seen as the backbone of Jewish creativity, it is "a conglomerate of law, legend and philosophy, a blend of unique logic and shrewd pragmatism, of history and science, anecdotes and humor" all aimed toward the purpose of studying biblical Torah.

Christians often treat the Bible as a single book, and while Barton says they are "some of the most profound texts humanity has ever produced", liberals and moderates see it as a collection of books that are not perfect. Conservative and fundamentalist Christians see the Bible differently and interpret it differently. Christianity interprets the Bible differently than Judaism does with Islam providing yet another view. How inspiration works and what kind of authority it means the Bible has are different for different traditions.

The Second Epistle to Timothy claims, "All Scripture is breathed out by God and profitable for teaching, for reproof, for correction, and for training in righteousness" (2 Tim. 3:16). Various related but distinguishable views on divine inspiration include:

- the view of the Bible as the inspired word of God: the belief that God, through the Holy Spirit, intervened and influenced the words, message, and collation of the Bible
- the view that the Bible is also infallible, and incapable of error in matters of faith and practice, but not necessarily in historic or scientific matters
- the view that the Bible represents the inerrant word of God, without error in any aspect, spoken by God and written down in its perfect form by humans

Within these broad beliefs many schools of hermeneutics operate. "Bible scholars claim that discussions about the Bible must be put into its context within church history and then into the context of contemporary culture." Fundamentalist Christians are associated with the doctrine of biblical literalism, where the Bible is not only inerrant, but the meaning of the text is clear to the average reader.

Jewish antiquity attests to belief in sacred texts, and a similar belief emerges in the earliest of Christian writings. Various texts of the Bible mention divine agency in relation to its writings. In their book A General Introduction to the Bible, Norman Geisler and William Nix write: "The process of inspiration is a mystery of the providence of God, but the result of this process is a verbal, plenary, inerrant, and authoritative record." Most evangelical biblical scholars associate inspiration with only the original text; for example some American Protestants adhere to the 1978 Chicago Statement on Biblical Inerrancy which asserted that inspiration applied only to the autographic text of scripture. Among adherents of biblical literalism, a minority, such as followers of the King-James-Only Movement, extend the claim of inerrancy only to a particular version.

=== Religious significance ===
Both Judaism and Christianity see the Bible as religiously and intellectually significant. It provides insight into its time and into the composition of the texts, and it represents an important step in the development of thought. It is used in communal worship, recited and memorized, provides personal guidance, a basis for counselling, church doctrine, religious culture (teaching, hymns and worship), and ethical standards. According to Barton:

The Bible is centrally important to both Judaism and Christianity, but not as a holy text out of which entire religious systems can somehow be read. Its contents illuminate the origins of Christianity and Judaism, and provide spiritual classics on which both faiths can draw; but they do not constrain subsequent generations in the way that a written constitution would. They are simply not that kind of thing. They are a repository of writings, both shaping and shaped by the two religions..."

As a result, there are teachings and creeds in Christianity and laws in Judaism that are seen by those religions as derived from the Bible which are not directly in the Bible.

For the Hebrew Bible, canonization is reserved for written texts, while sacralization reaches far back into oral tradition. When sacred stories, such as those that form the narrative base of the first five books of the Bible, were performed, "not a syllable [could] be changed in order to ensure the magical power of the words to 'presentify' the divine". Inflexibility protected the texts from a changing world. When sacred oral texts began the move to written transmission, commentary began being worked in, but once the text was closed by canonization, commentary needed to remain outside. Commentary still had significance. Sacred written texts were thereafter accompanied by commentary, and such commentary was sometimes written and sometimes orally transmitted, as is the case in the Islamic Madrasa and the Jewish Yeshiva. Arguing that Torah has had a definitive role in developing Jewish identity from its earliest days, John J. Collins explains that regardless of genetics or land, it has long been true that one could become Jewish by observing the laws in the Torah, and that remains true in the modern day.

The Christian religion and its sacred book are connected and influence one another, but the significance of the written text has varied throughout history. For Christianity, holiness did not reside in the written text, or in any particular language, it resided in the Christ the text witnessed to. Old Testament scholar David M. Carr writes that this gave early Christianity a more 'flexible' view of the written texts. Wilfred Cantwell Smith points out that "in the Islamic system, the Quran fulfills a function comparable to the role... played by the person of Jesus Christ, while a closer counterpart to Christian scriptures are the Islamic Hadith 'Traditions'." For centuries the written text had less significance than the will of the church as represented by the Pope, since the church saw the text as having been created by the church. One cause of the Reformation was the perceived need to reorient Christianity around its early text as authoritative. Some Protestant churches still focus on the idea of sola scriptura, which sees scripture as the only legitimate religious authority. Some denominations today support the use of the Bible as the only infallible source of Christian teaching. Others, though, advance the concept of prima scriptura in contrast, meaning scripture primarily or scripture mainly. (Note: "The United Methodists see Scripture as the primary source and criterion for Christian doctrine. They emphasize the importance of tradition, experience, and reason for Christian doctrine. Lutherans teach that the Bible is the sole source for Christian doctrine. The truths of Scripture do not need to be authenticated by tradition, human experience, or reason. Scripture is self authenticating and is true in and of itself.") (Note: "historically Anglicans have adopted what could be called a prima Scriptura position." Humphrey 2013, p. 16)

In the 21st century, attitudes towards the significance of the Bible continue to differ. Roman Catholics, High Church Anglicans, Methodists and Eastern Orthodox Christians stress the harmony and importance of both the Bible and sacred tradition in combination. United Methodists see Scripture as the major factor in Christian doctrine, but they also emphasize the importance of tradition, experience, and reason. Lutherans teach that the Bible is the sole source for Christian doctrine. Muslims view the Bible as an original revelation from God; but Jews and Christians corrupted it through falsification and alteration (Taḥrīf), and therefore the Quran is revealed by God to the Islamic prophet Muhammad. The Rastafari view the Bible as essential to their religion, while the Unitarian Universalists view it as "one of many important religious texts".

== Versions and translations ==
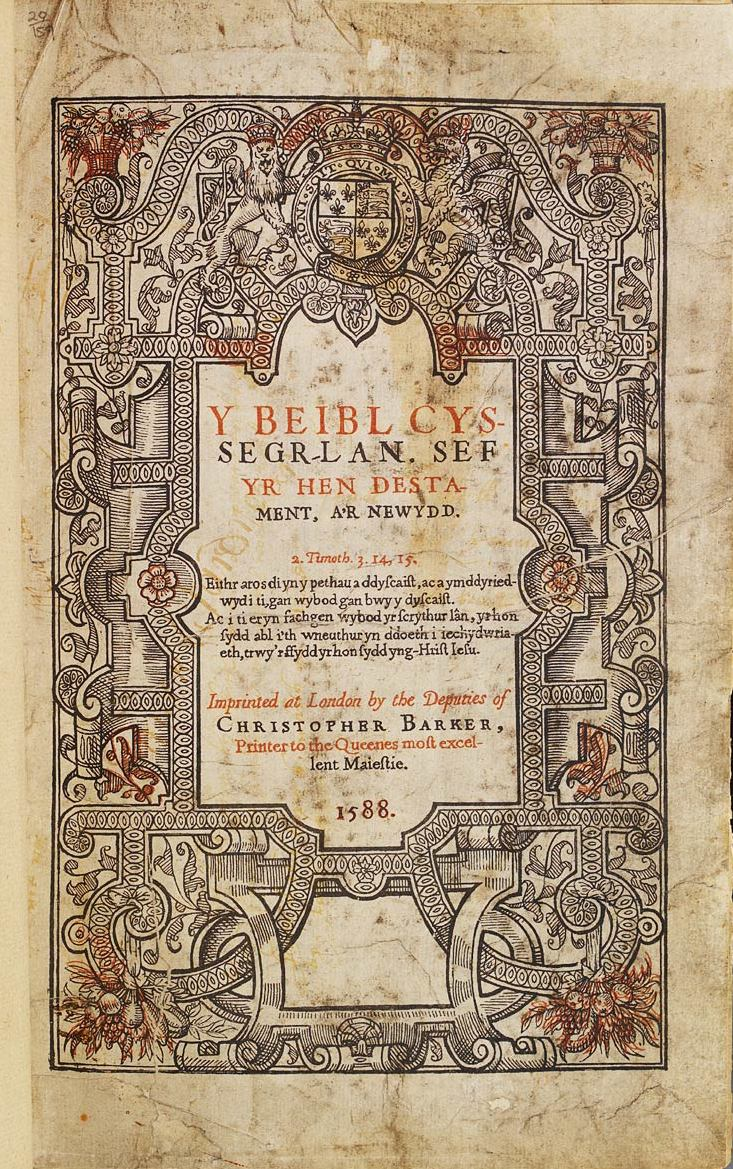
Title page from the first Welsh translation of the Bible, published in 1588, and translated by William Morgan)

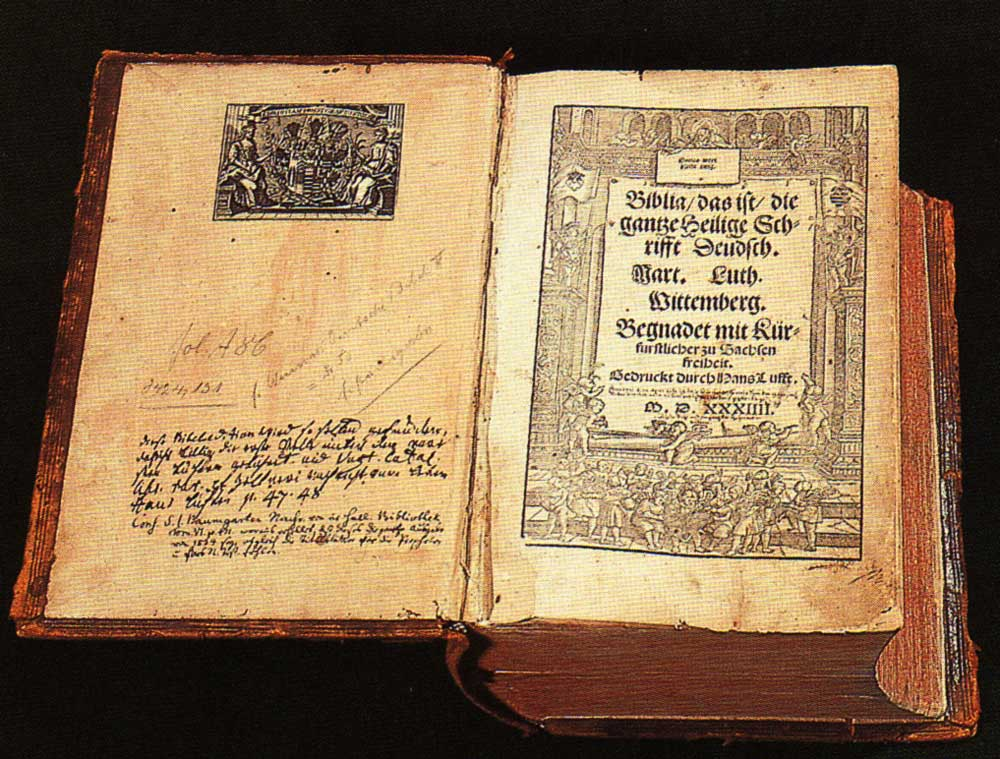
An early German translation of the Bible by Martin Luther, whose translation of the text into the vernacular was highly influential in the development of Lutheranism and the Reformation

The original texts of the Tanakh were almost entirely written in Hebrew with about one per cent in Aramaic. The earliest translation of any Bible text is the Septuagint which translated the Hebrew into Greek. As the first translation of any biblical literature, the translation that became the Septuagint was an unparalleled event in the ancient world. This translation was made possible by a common Mediterranean culture where Semitism had been foundational to Greek culture. In the Talmud, Greek is the only language officially allowed for translation. The Targum Onkelos is the Aramaic translation of the Hebrew Bible believed to have been written in the second century CE. These texts attracted the work of various scholars, but a standardized text was not available before the 9th century.

There were different ancient versions of the Tanakh in Hebrew. These were copied and edited in three different locations producing slightly varying results. Masoretic scholars in Tiberias in ancient Palestine copied the ancient texts in Tiberian Hebrew. A copy was recovered from the "Cave of Elijah" (the synagogue of Aleppo in the Judean desert) and is therefore referred to as the Aleppo Codex which dates to around 920. This codex, which is over a thousand years old, was originally the oldest codex of the complete Tiberian Hebrew Bible. Babylonian masoretes had also copied the early texts, and the Tiberian and Babylonian were later combined, using the Aleppo Codex and additional writings, to form the Ben-Asher masoretic tradition which is the standardized Hebrew Bible of today. The Aleppo Codex is no longer the oldest complete manuscript because, during riots in 1947, the Aleppo Codex was removed from its location, and about 40% of it was subsequently lost. It must now rely on additional manuscripts, and as a result, the Aleppo Codex contains the most comprehensive collection of variant readings. The oldest complete version of the Masoretic tradition is the Leningrad Codex from 1008. It is the source for all modern Jewish and Christian translations.

Levidas writes that, "The Koine Greek New Testament is a non-translated work; most scholars agree on this – despite disagreement on the possibility that some passages may have appeared initially in Aramaic... It is written in the Koine Greek of the first century [CE]". Early Christians translated the New Testament into Old Syriac, Coptic, Ethiopic, and Latin, among other languages. The earliest Latin translation was the Old Latin text, or Vetus Latina, which, from internal evidence, seems to have been made by several authors over a period of time.

Pope Damasus I (366–383) commissioned Jerome to produce a reliable and consistent text by translating the original Greek and Hebrew texts into Latin. This translation became known as the Latin Vulgate Bible, in the 4th century CE (although Jerome expressed in his prologues to most deuterocanonical books that they were non-canonical). In 1546, at the Council of Trent, Jerome's Vulgate translation was declared by the Roman Catholic Church to be the only authentic and official Bible in the Latin Church. The Greek-speaking East continued to use the Septuagint translations of the Old Testament, and they had no need to translate the Greek New Testament. This contributed to the East-West Schism.

Many ancient translations coincide with the invention of the alphabet and the beginning of vernacular literature in those languages. According to British Academy professor N. Fernández Marcos, these early translations represent "pioneer works of enormous linguistic interest, as they represent the oldest documents we have for the study of these languages and literature".

Translations to English can be traced to the seventh century, Alfred the Great in the 9th century, the Toledo School of Translators in the 12th and 13th century, Roger Bacon (1220–1292), an English Franciscan friar of the 13th century, and multiple writers of the Renaissance. The Wycliffite Bible, which is "one of the most significant in the development of a written standard", dates from the late Middle English period. William Tyndale's translation of 1525 is seen by several scholars as having influenced the form of English Christian discourse as well as impacting the development of the English language itself. Martin Luther translated the New Testament into German in 1522, and both Testaments with Apocrypha in 1534, thereby contributing to the multiple wars of the Age of Reformation and Counter-Reformation. Important biblical translations of this period include the Polish Jakub Wujek Bible (Biblia Jakuba Wujka) from 1535, and the English King James/Authorized Version (1604–1611). The King James Version was the most widespread English Bible of all time, but it has largely been superseded by modern translations. Some New Testaments verses found to be later additions to the text are not included in modern English translations, despite appearing in older English translations such as the King James Version.

Historically significant translations of the Bible in English
Name	Abbreviation	Published (Note: That is, the first year of a full translation (irrespective of containing the Apocrypha) having been published.)
Wycliffe Bible	WYC	1382
Tyndale Bible (Note: William Tyndale was stopped from translating all the books of the Old Testament due to his arrest in May 1535 and subsequent execution in October 1536.)	TYN	1526 (Note: The first complete publication of William Tyndale's New Testament took place in 1526.)
Geneva Bible	GNV	1560
Douay–Rheims Bible	DRB	1610 (Note: The Douay–Rheims Bible was published in multiple volumes. The last volume of the Old Testament was published in 1610.)
King James Version	KJV	1611
English Revised Version	RV	1885
Revised Standard Version	RSV	1952
New American Bible	NAB	1970
New International Version	NIV	1978
New King James Version	NKJV	1982
New Revised Standard Version	NRSV	1989
English Standard Version	ESV	2001

Some denominations have additional canonical texts beyond the Bible, including the Standard Works of the Latter Day Saints movement and Divine Principle in the Unification Church.

Nearly all modern English translations of the Old Testament are based on a single manuscript, the Leningrad Codex, copied in 1008 or 1009. It is a complete example of the Masoretic Text, and its published edition is used by the majority of scholars. The Aleppo Codex is the basis of the Hebrew University Bible Project in Jerusalem.

Since the Reformation era, Bible translations have been made into the common vernacular of many languages. The Bible continues to be translated to new languages, largely by Christian organizations such as Wycliffe Bible Translators, New Tribes Mission and Bible societies. Lamin Sanneh writes that tracing the impact on the local cultures of translating the Bible into local vernacular language shows it has produced "the movements of indigenization and cultural liberation". "The translated scripture ... has become the benchmark of awakening and renewal".

Bible translations, worldwide (as of August 2025)
Number	Statistic
7,396	Approximate number of languages spoken in the world today
4,457	Number of translations into new languages in progress
1,433	Number of languages with some translated Bible portions
1,798	Number of languages with a translation of the New Testament
776	Number of languages with a full translation of the Bible (Protestant Canon)
4,007	Total number of languages with some Bible translation

== Archaeological and historical research ==
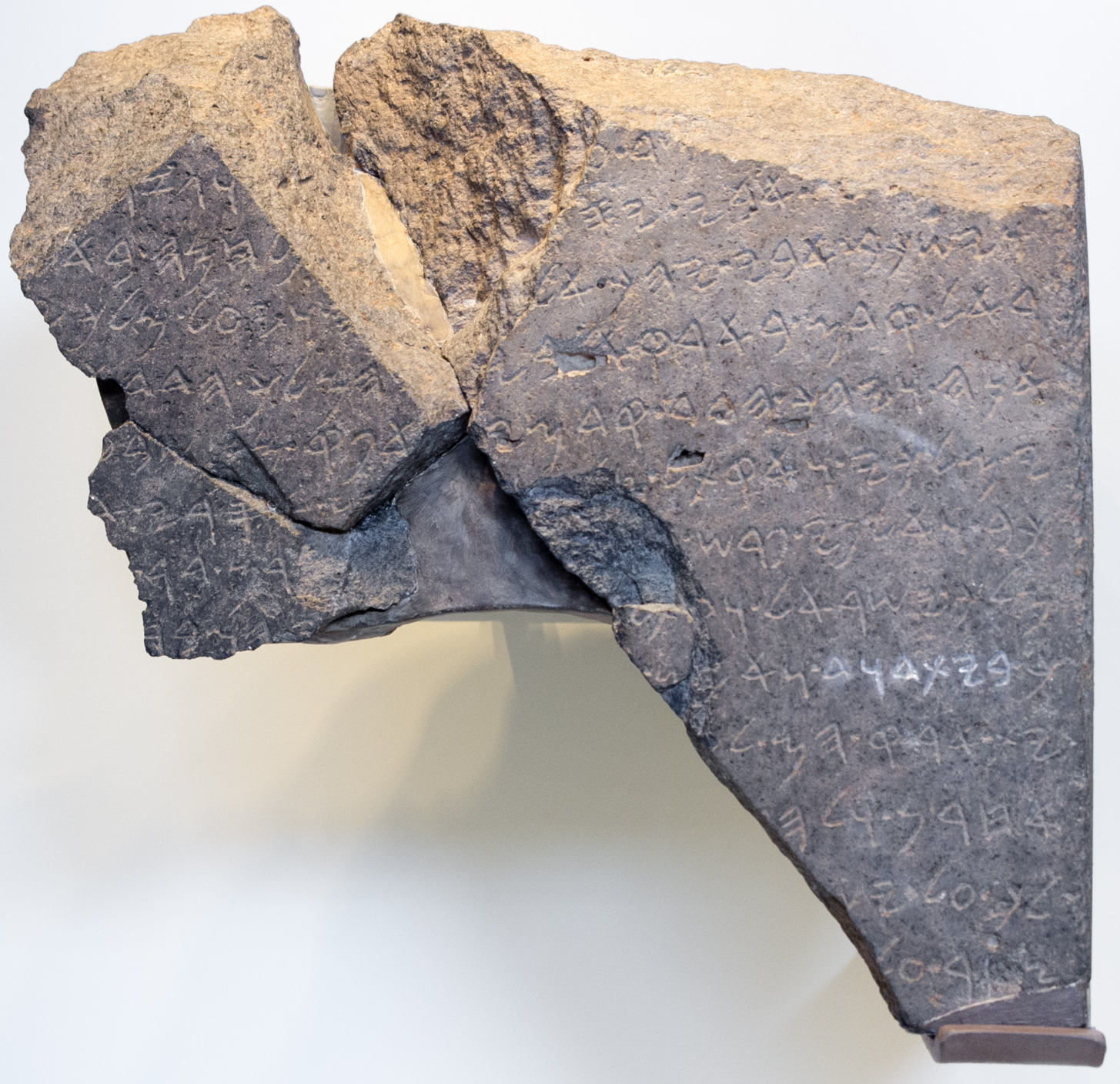
The Tel Dan Stele at the Israel Museum. Highlighted in white: the sequence B Y T D W D

Biblical archaeology is a subsection of archaeology that relates to and sheds light upon the Hebrew scriptures and the New Testament. It is used to help determine the lifestyle and practices of people living in biblical times. There are a wide range of interpretations in the field of biblical archaeology. One broad division includes biblical maximalism, which generally takes the view that most of the Old Testament or the Hebrew Bible is based on history although it is presented through the religious viewpoint of its time. According to historian Lester L. Grabbe, there are "few, if any" maximalists in mainstream scholarship. It is considered to be the extreme opposite of biblical minimalism which considers the Bible to be a purely post-exilic (5th century BCE and later) composition. According to Mary Joan Winn Leith, professor of religious studies, many minimalists have ignored evidence for the antiquity of the Hebrew language in the Bible, and few take archaeological evidence into consideration. Most biblical scholars and archaeologists fall somewhere on a spectrum between these two.

The biblical account of events of the Exodus from Egypt in the Torah, the migration to the Promised Land, and the period of Judges are sources of heated ongoing debate. There is an absence of evidence for the presence of Israel in Egypt from any Egyptian source, historical or archaeological. Yet, as William Dever points out, these biblical traditions were written long after the events they describe, and they are based in sources now lost and older oral traditions.

The Hebrew Bible/Old Testament, ancient non–biblical texts, and archaeology support the Babylonian captivity beginning around 586 BCE. Excavations in southern Judah show a pattern of destruction consistent with the Neo-Assyrian devastation of Judah at the end of the eighth century BCE and 2 Kings 18:13. In 1993, at Tel Dan, archaeologist Avraham Biran unearthed a fragmentary Aramaic inscription, the Tel Dan stele, dated to the late ninth or early eighth century that mentions a "king of Israel" as well as a "house of David" (bet David). This shows David could not be a late sixth-century invention, and implies that Judah's kings traced their lineage back to someone named David. However, there is no current archaeological evidence for the existence of King David and Solomon or the First Temple as far back as the tenth century BCE where the Bible places them.

In the nineteenth and early twentieth century, surveys demonstrated that Acts of the Apostles (Acts) scholarship was divided into two traditions, "a conservative (largely British) tradition which had great confidence in the historicity of Acts and a less conservative (largely German) tradition which had very little confidence in the historicity of Acts". Subsequent surveys show that little has changed. Author Thomas E. Phillips writes that "In this two-century-long debate over the historicity of Acts and its underlying traditions, only one assumption seemed to be shared by all: Acts was intended to be read as history". This too is now being debated by scholars as: what genre does Acts actually belong to? There is a growing consensus, however, that the question of genre is unsolvable and would not, in any case, solve the issue of historicity: "Is Acts history or fiction? In the eyes of most scholars, it is history – but not the kind of history that precludes fiction." says Phillips.

== Biblical criticism ==
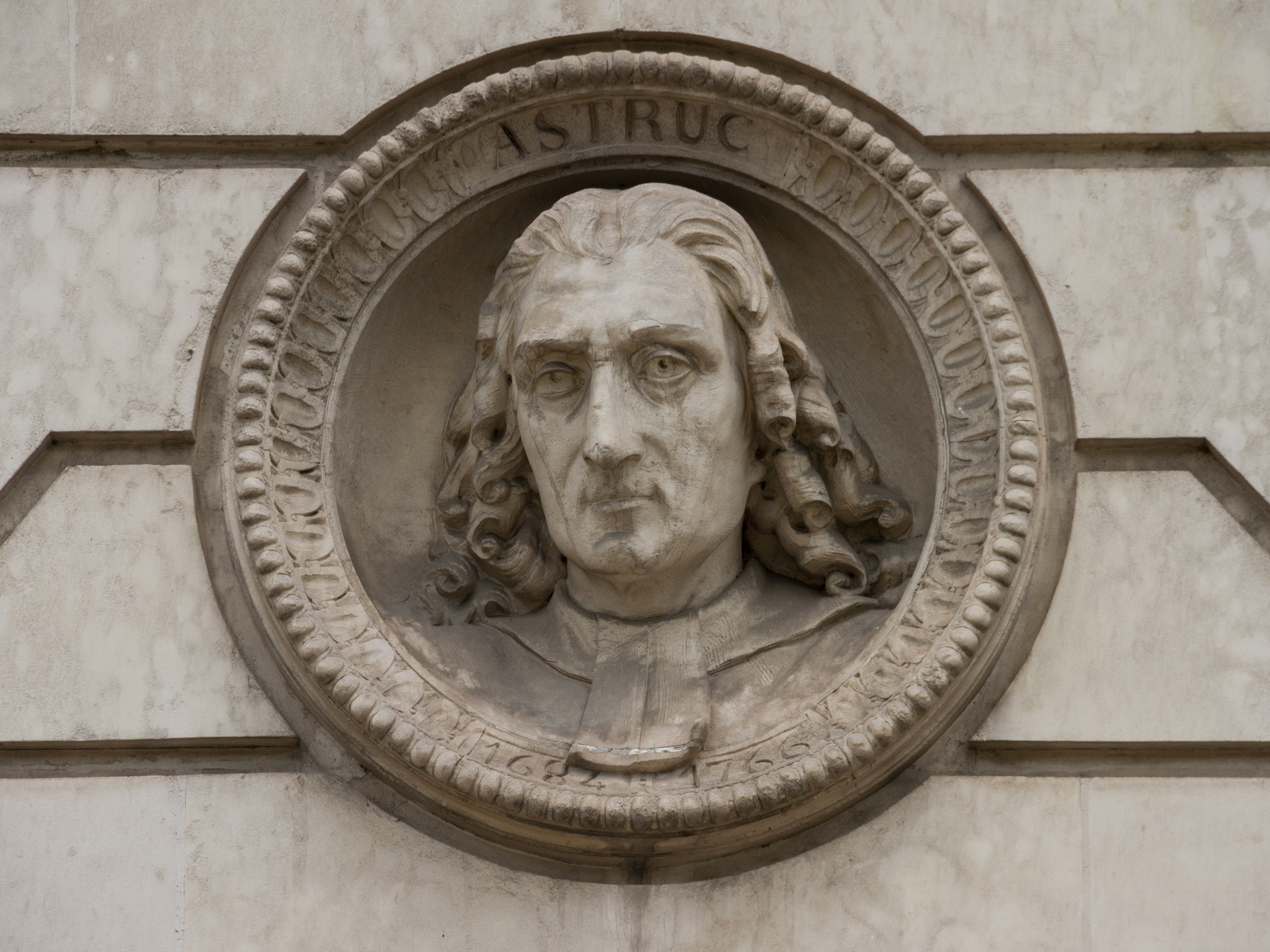
Jean Astruc, often called the "father of biblical criticism", at Centre hospitalier universitaire de Toulouse

Biblical criticism refers to the analytical investigation of the Bible as a text, and addresses questions such as history, authorship, dates of composition, and authorial intention. It is not the same as criticism of the Bible, which is an assertion against the Bible being a source of information or ethical guidance, nor is it criticism of possible translation errors.

Biblical criticism made study of the Bible secularized, scholarly, and more democratic, while it also permanently altered the way people understood the Bible. The Bible is no longer thought of solely as a religious artefact, and its interpretation is no longer restricted to the community of believers. Michael Fishbane writes, "There are those who regard the desacralization of the Bible as the fortunate condition for" the development of the modern world. For many, biblical criticism "released a host of threats" to the Christian faith. For others biblical criticism "proved to be a failure, due principally to the assumption that diachronic, linear research could master any and all of the questions and problems attendant on interpretation". Still others believed that biblical criticism, "shorn of its unwarranted arrogance," could be a reliable source of interpretation. Michael Fishbane compares biblical criticism to Job, a prophet who destroyed "self-serving visions for the sake of a more honest crossing from the divine textus to the human one". Or as Rogerson says: biblical criticism has been liberating for those who want their faith "intelligently grounded and intellectually honest".

== Bible museums ==
- The Dunham Bible Museum is located at Houston Baptist University in Houston, Texas. It is known for its collection of rare Bibles from around the world and for having many different Bibles of various languages.
- The Museum of the Bible opened in Washington, D.C. in November 2017. The museum states that its intent is to "share the historical relevance and significance of the sacred scriptures in a nonsectarian way", but this has been questioned.
- The Bible Museum in St Arnaud, Victoria, in Australia opened in 2009.
- There is a Bible Museum at The Great Passion Play in Eureka Springs, Arkansas.
- The Bible Museum on the Square in Collierville, Tennessee, opened in 1997.
- Biedenharn Museum and Gardens in Monroe, Louisiana, which includes a Bible Museum.

== Illustrations ==
The grandest medieval Bibles were illuminated manuscripts in which the text is supplemented by the addition of decoration, such as decorated initials, borders (marginalia) and miniature illustrations. Up to the 12th century, most manuscripts were produced in monasteries in order to add to the library or after receiving a commission from a wealthy patron. Larger monasteries often contained separate areas for the monks who specialized in the production of manuscripts called a scriptorium, where "separate little rooms were assigned to book copying; they were situated in such a way that each scribe had to himself a window open to the cloister walk." By the 14th century, the cloisters of monks writing in the scriptorium started to employ laybrothers from the urban scriptoria, especially in Paris, Rome and the Netherlands. Demand for manuscripts grew to an extent that the Monastic libraries were unable to meet with the demand, and began employing secular scribes and illuminators. These individuals often lived close to the monastery and, in certain instances, dressed as monks whenever they entered the monastery, but were allowed to leave at the end of the day. A notable example of an illuminated manuscript is the Book of Kells, produced circa the year 800 containing the four Gospels of the New Testament together with various prefatory texts and tables.

The manuscript was "sent to the rubricator, who added (in red or other colours) the titles, headlines, the initials of chapters and sections, the notes and so on; and then – if the book was to be illustrated – it was sent to the illuminator." In the case of manuscripts that were sold commercially, the writing would "undoubtedly have been discussed initially between the patron and the scribe (or the scribe's agent,) but by the time that the written gathering were sent off to the illuminator there was no longer any scope for innovation."

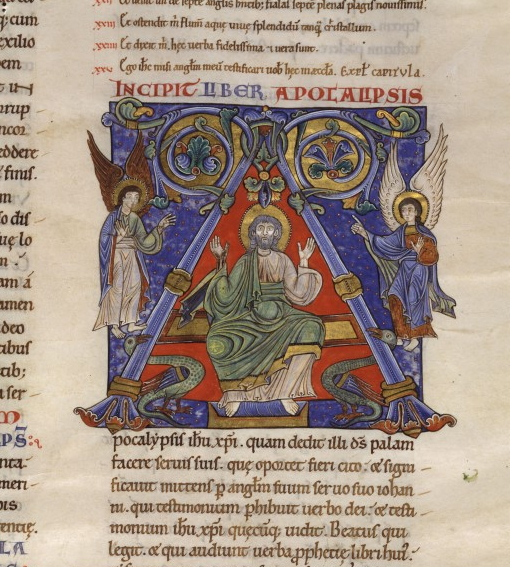
Bible from 1150, from Scriptorium de Chartres, Christ with angels

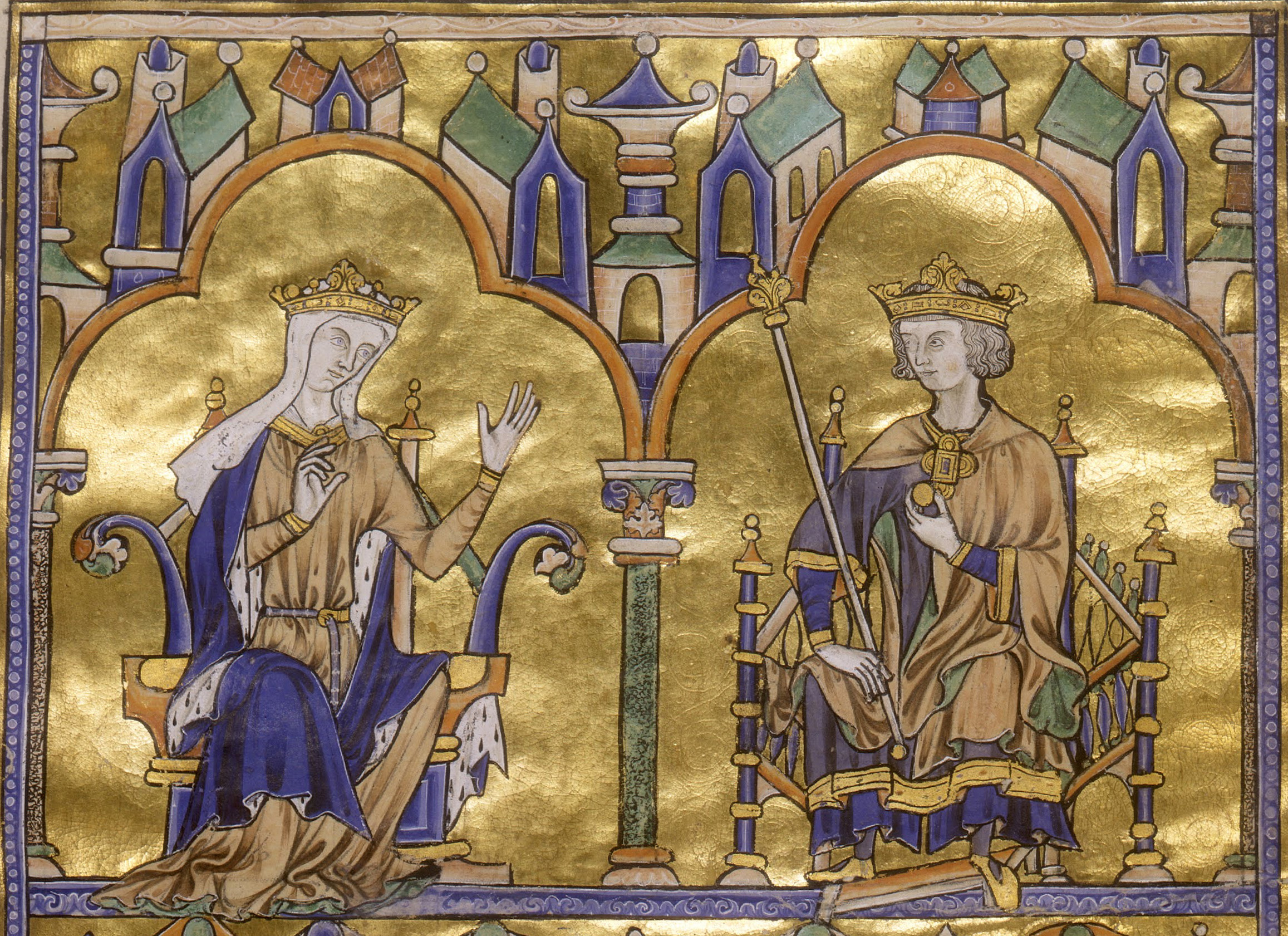
Blanche of Castile and Louis IX of France Bible, 13th century

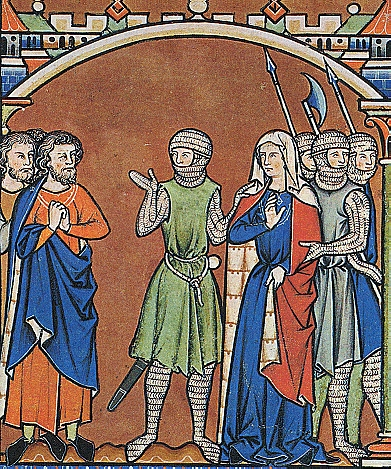
Maciejowski Bible, Leaf 37, the 3rd image, Abner (in the centre in green) sends Michal back to David.

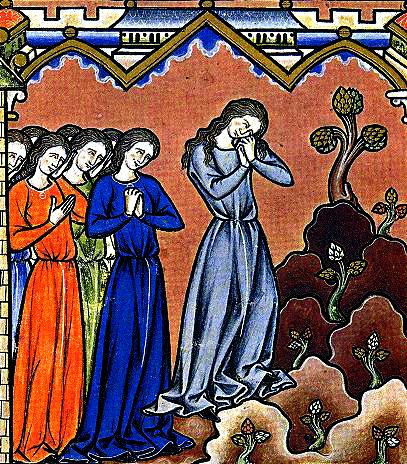
Jephthah's daughter laments – Maciejowski Bible (France, c. 1250)

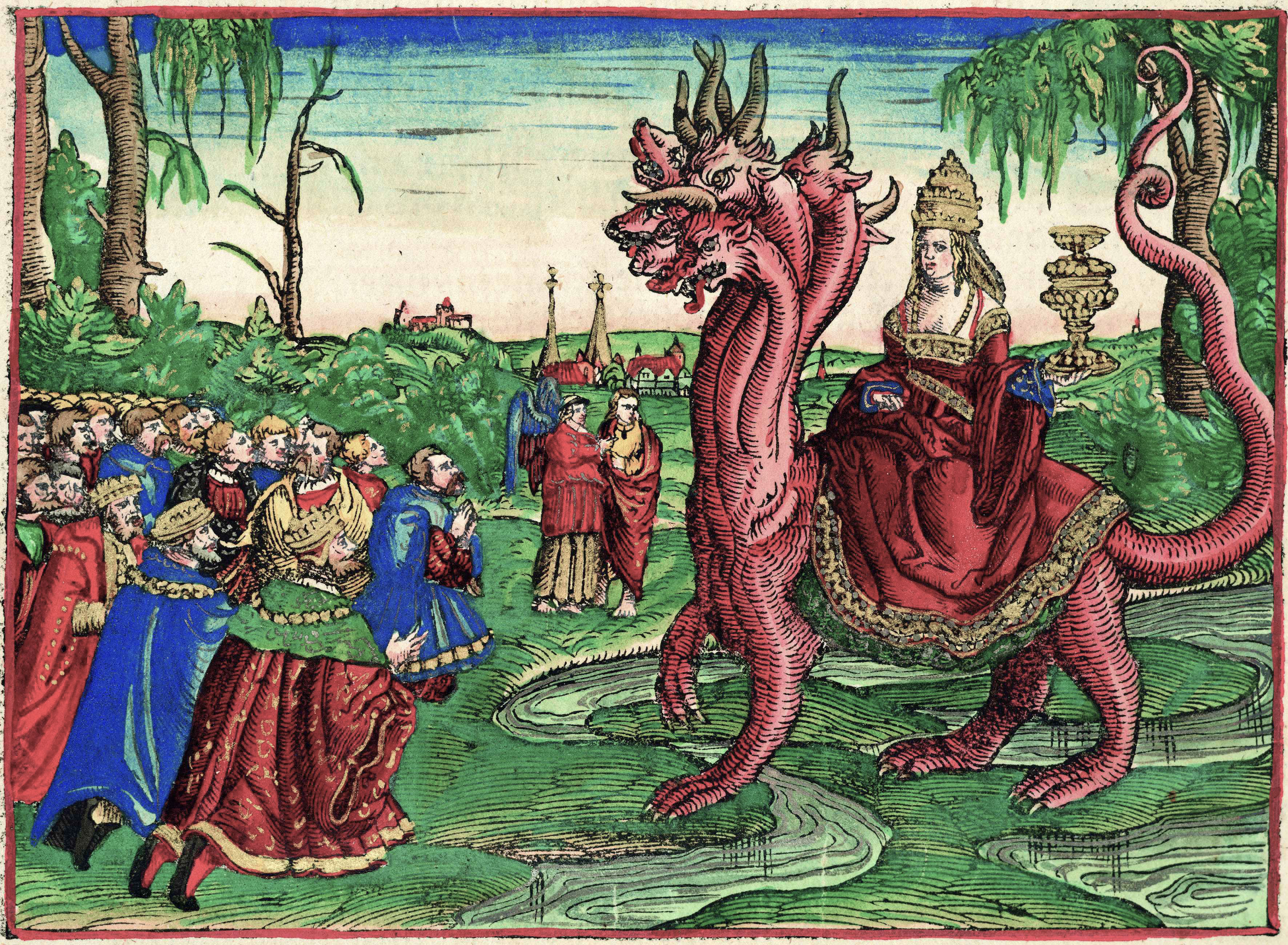
Coloured version of the Whore of Babylon illustration from Martin Luther's 1534 translation of the Bible

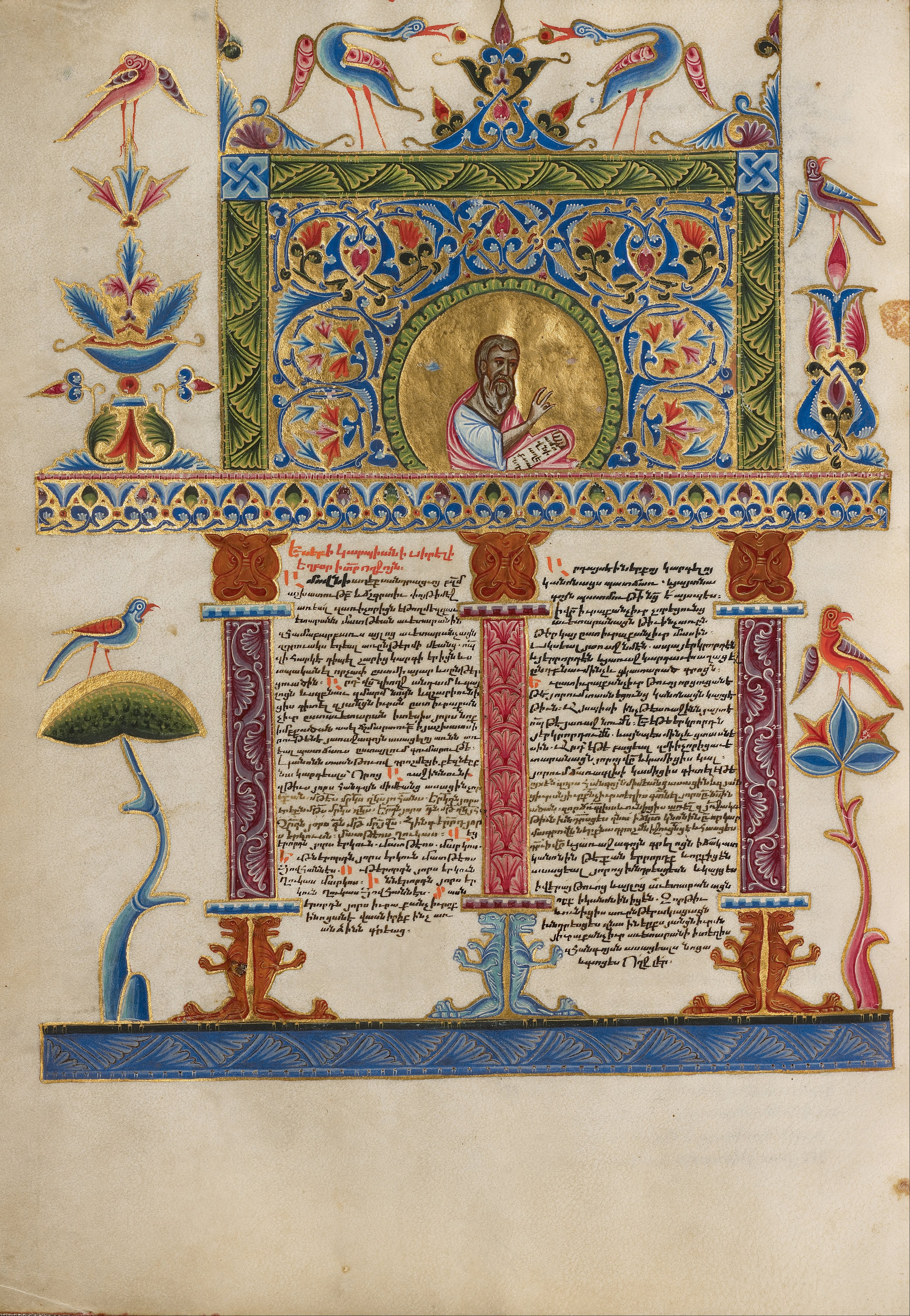
An Armenian Bible, 17th century, illuminated by Malnazar

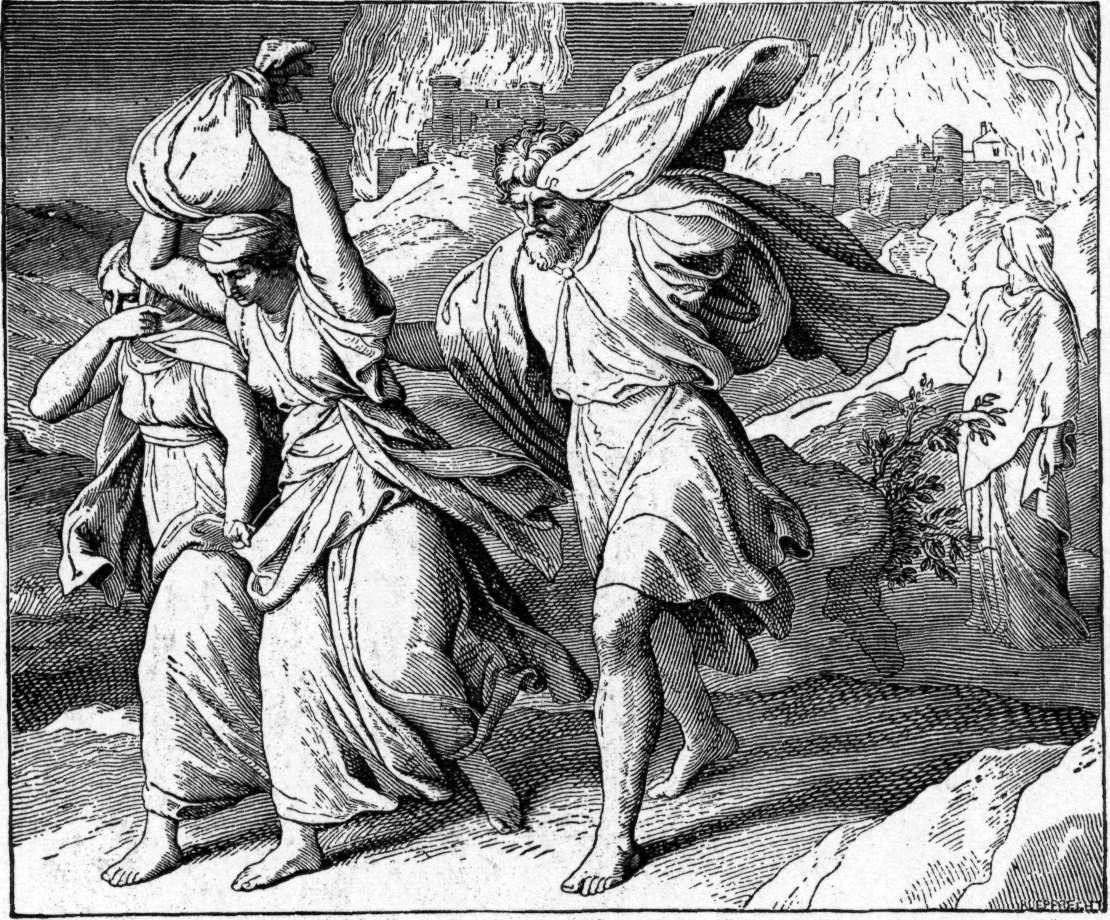
Fleeing Sodom and Gomorrah, Foster Bible, 19th century

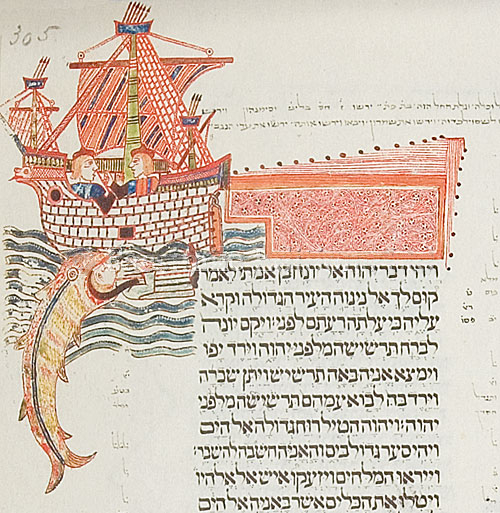
Jonah being swallowed by the fish, Kennicott Bible, 1476

== Gallery ==
Bibles

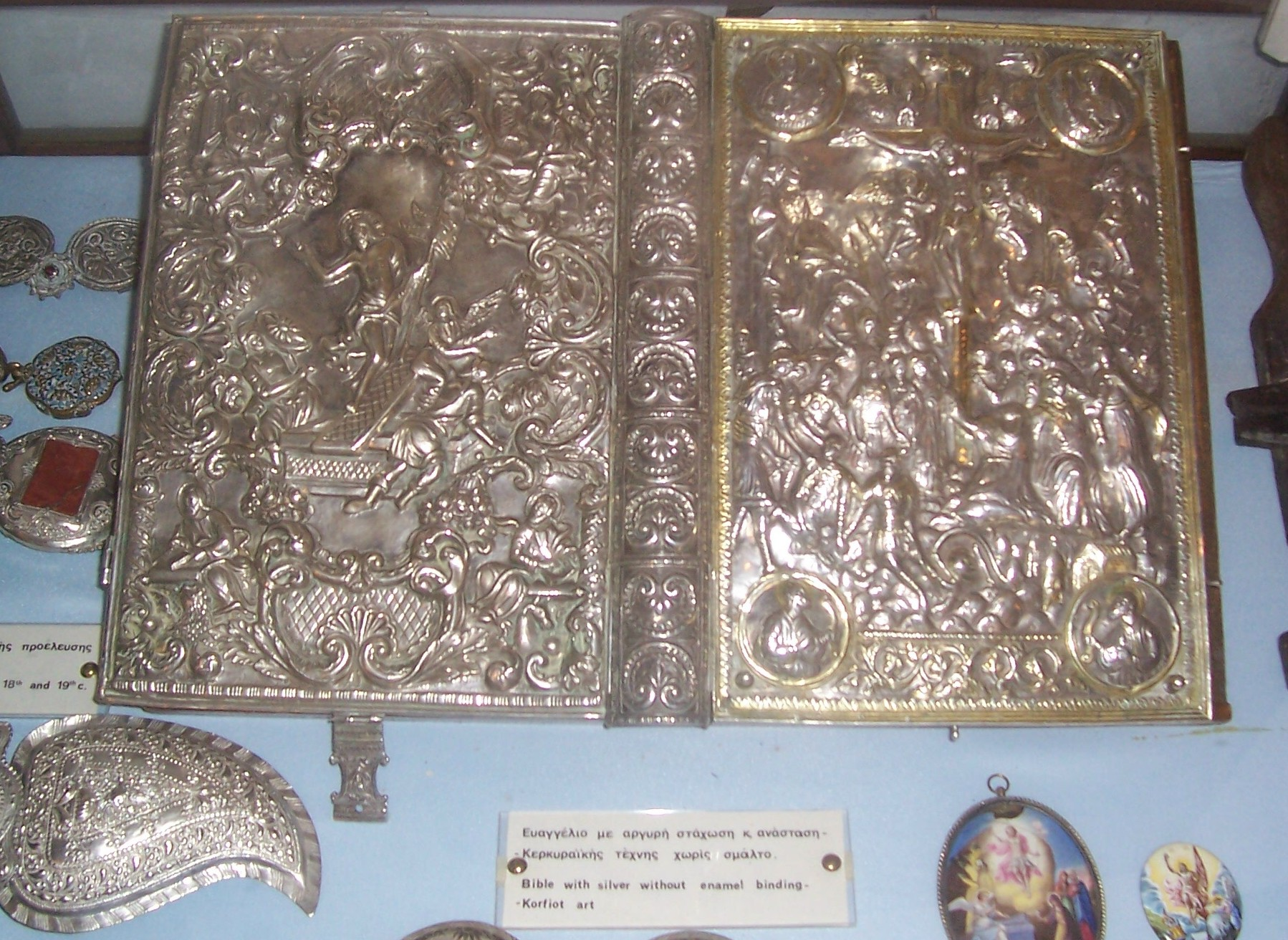
An old Bible from a Greek monastery

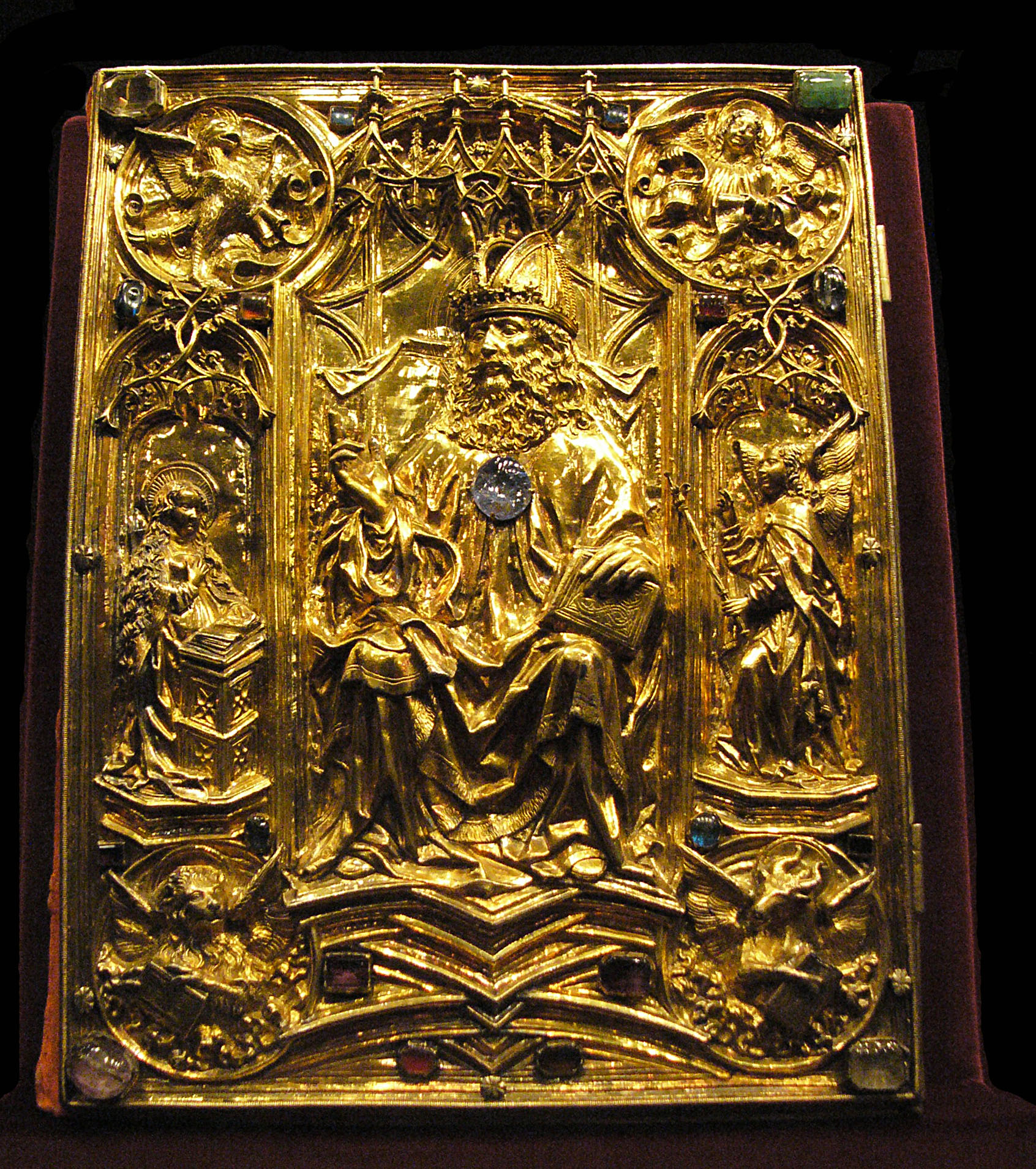
The Imperial Bible, or Vienna Coronation Gospels from Wien, Austria, c. 1500

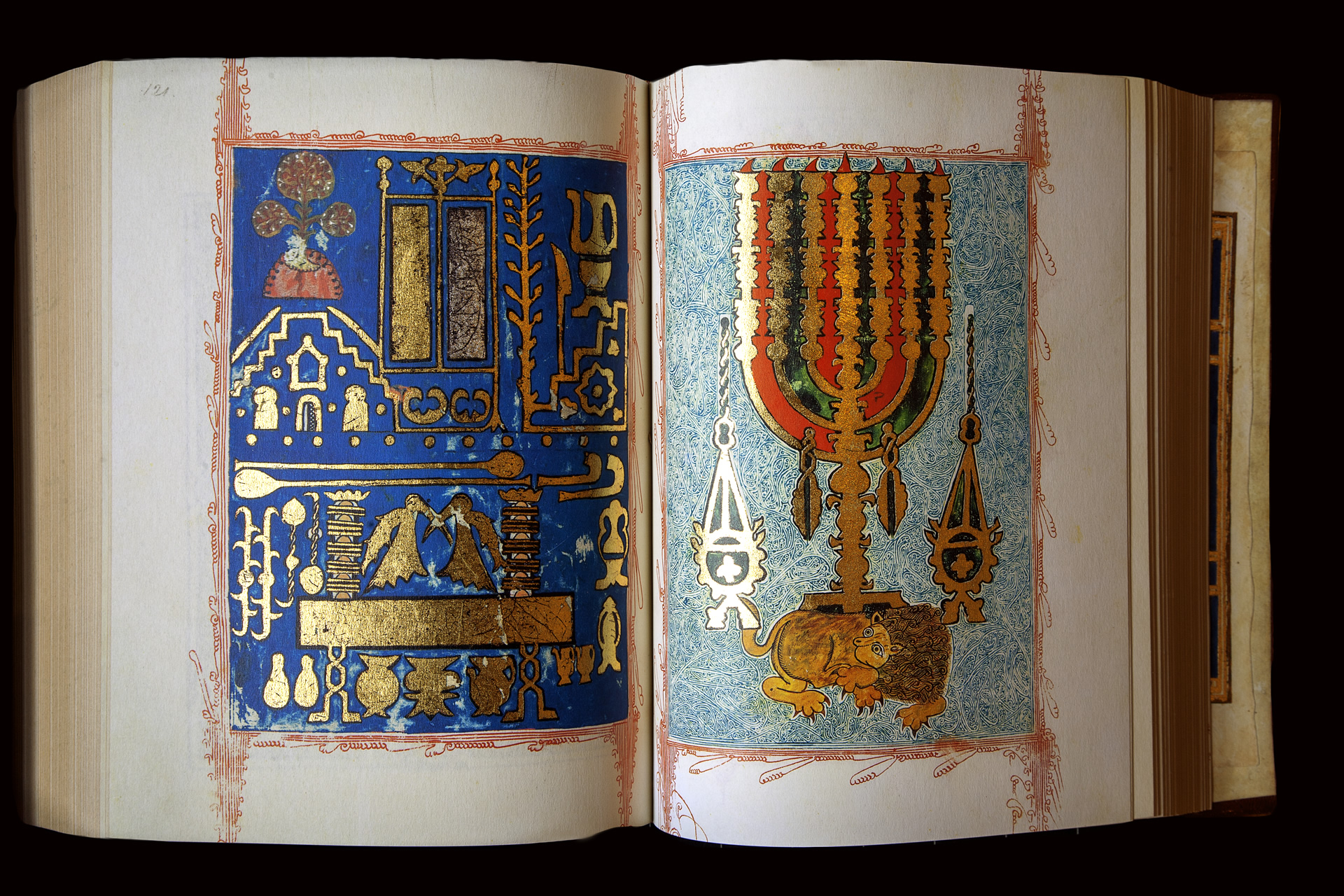
The Kennicott Bible in 1476

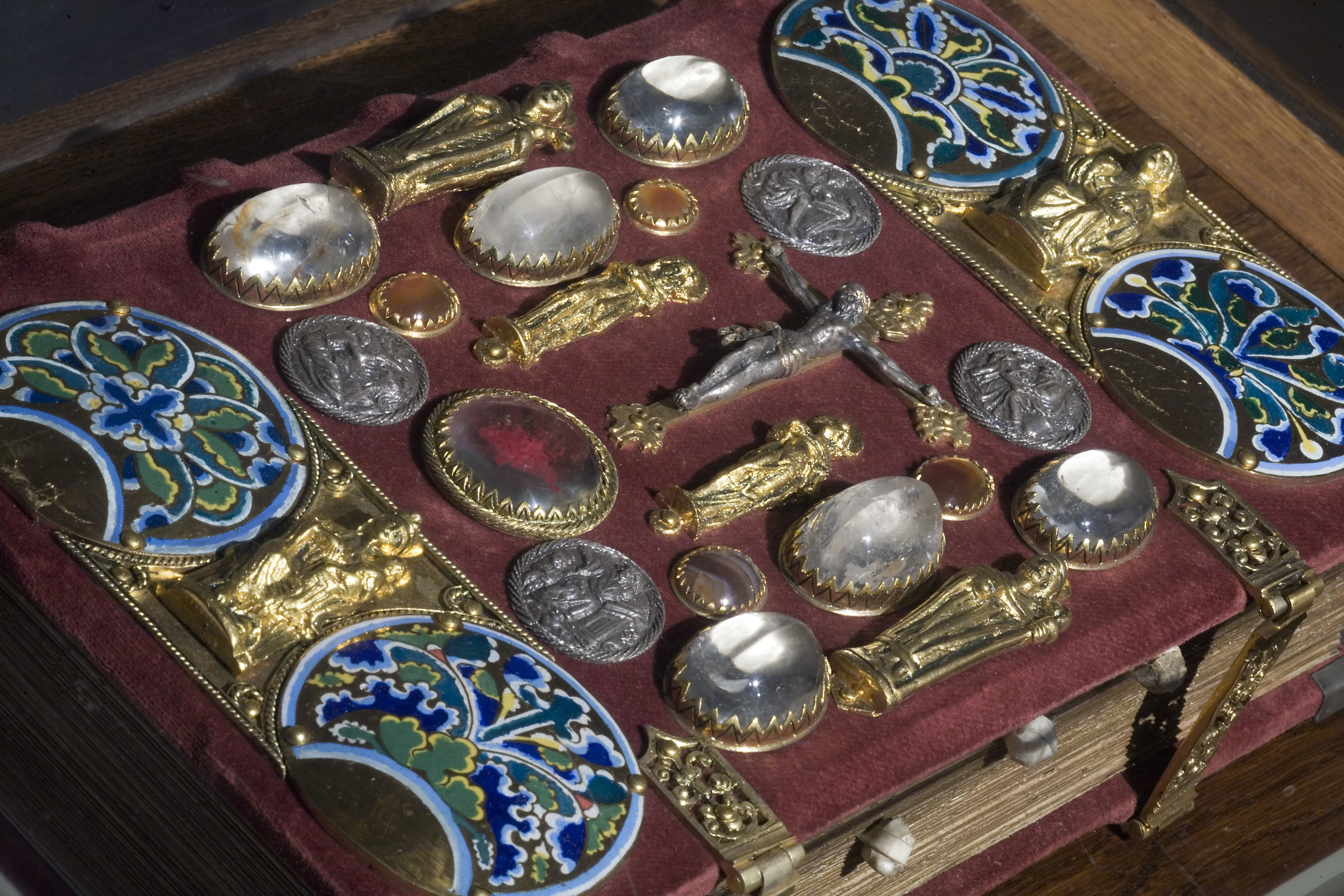
A Baroque Bible

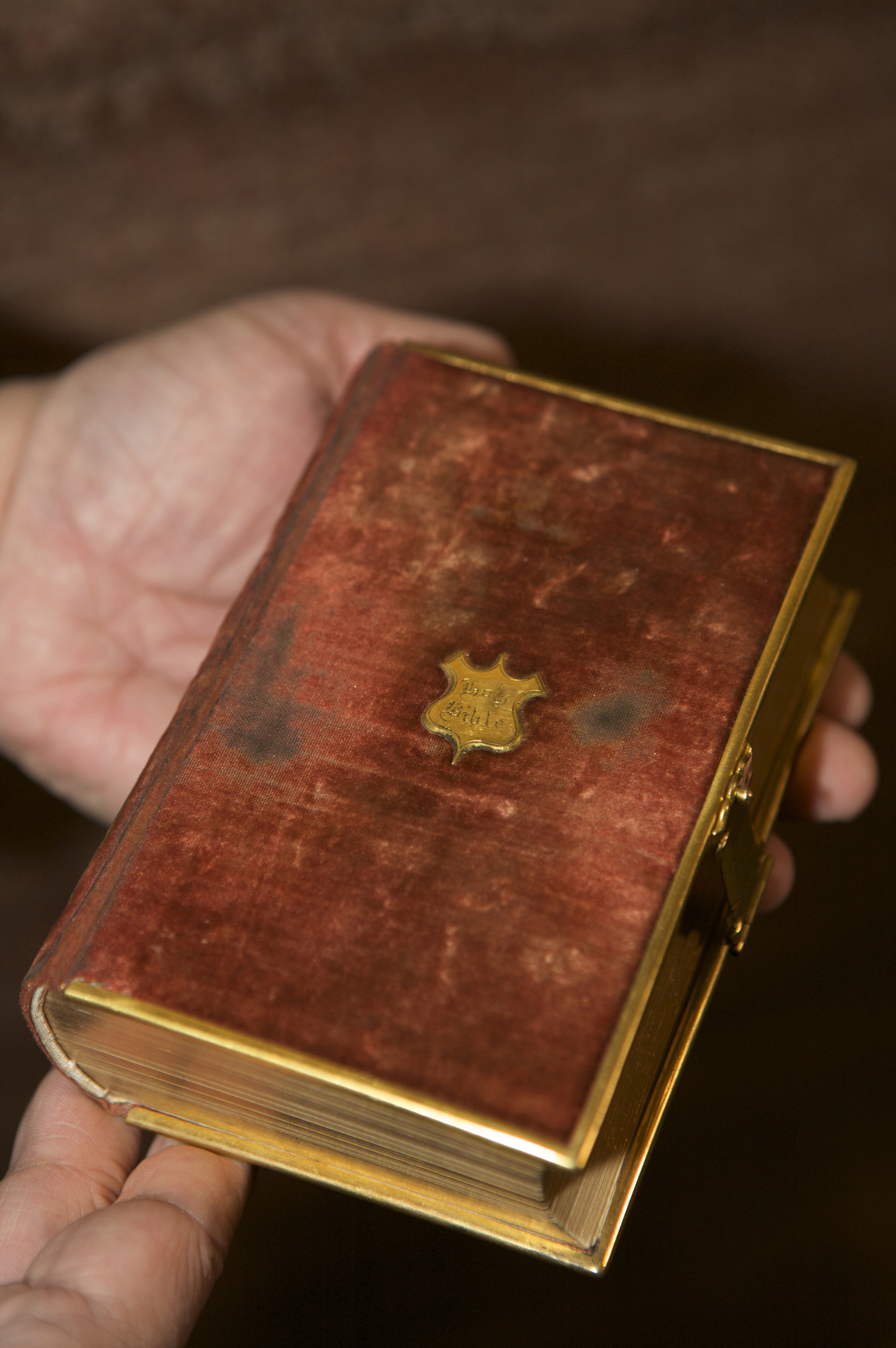
The Bible used by Abraham Lincoln for his oath of office during his first inaugural in 1861

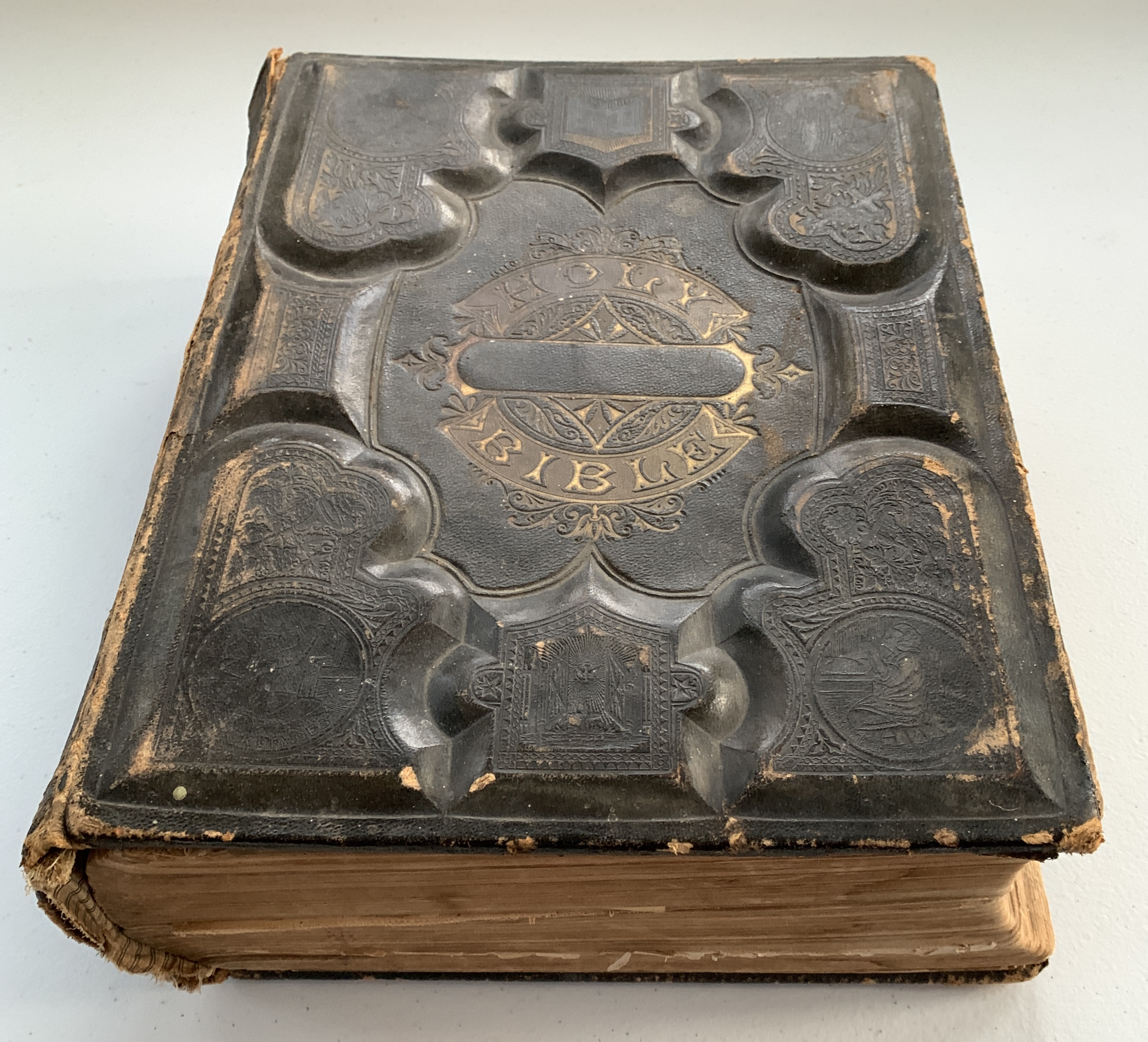
American Civil War-era illustrated Bible

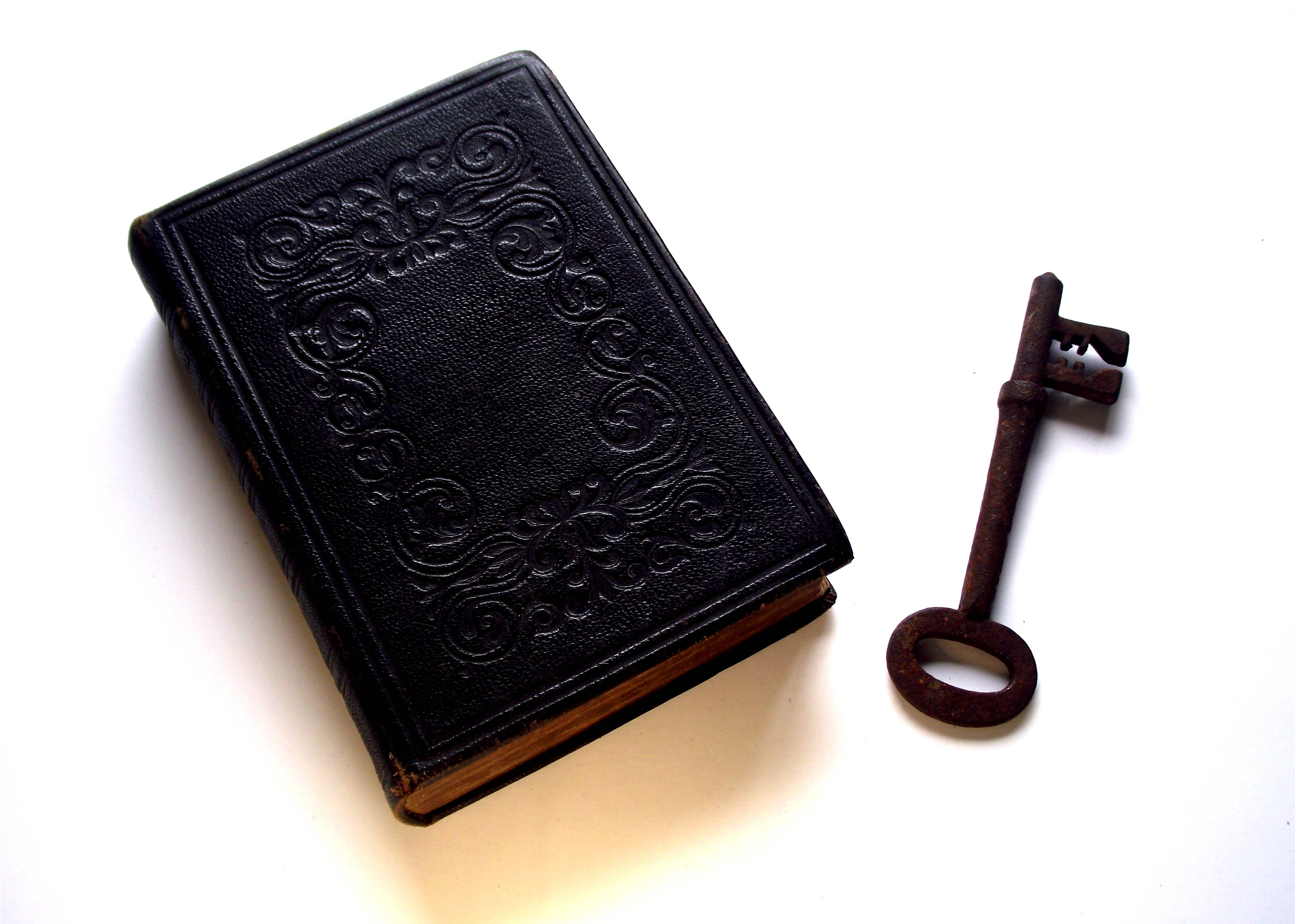
A miniature Bible

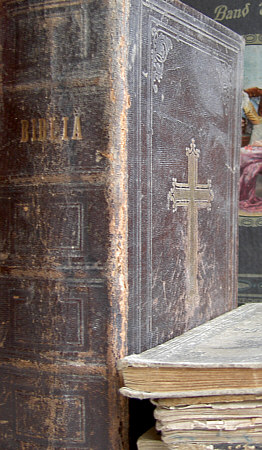
An 1866 Victorian Bible

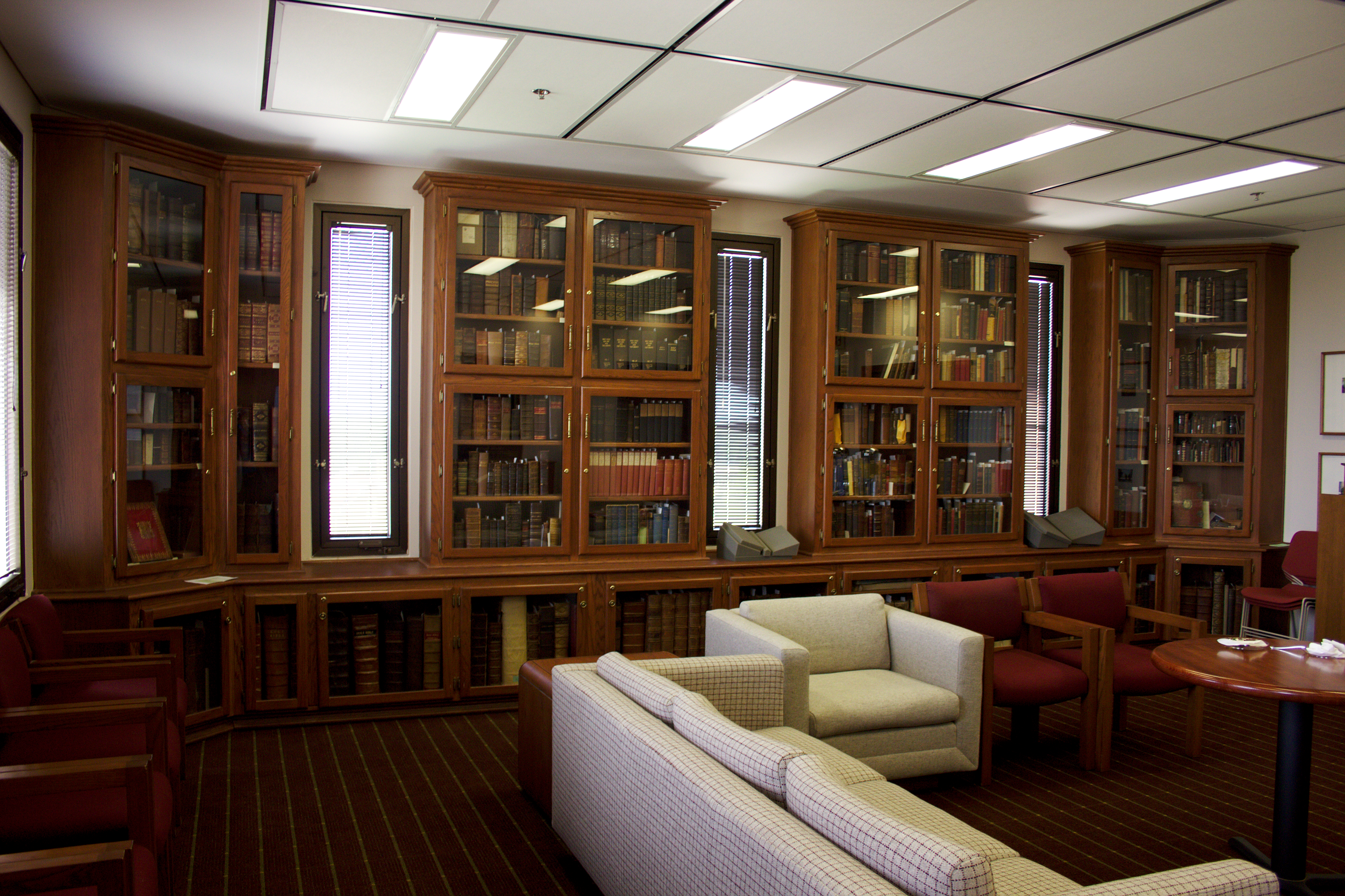
Shelves of the Bizzell Bible Collection at Bizzell Memorial Library

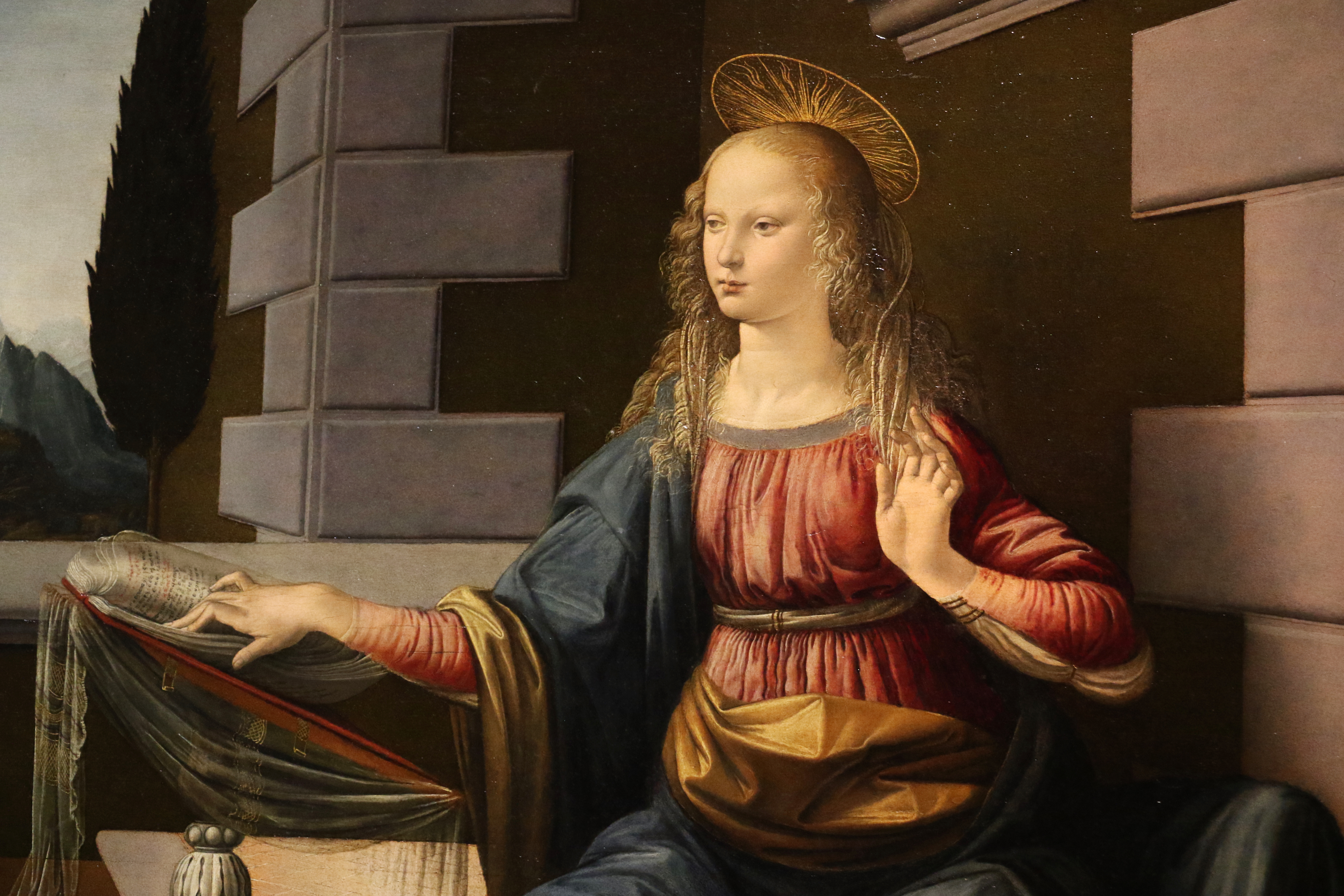
Leonardo da Vinci's Annunciation (c. 1472–1475), showing the Virgin Mary reading the Bible

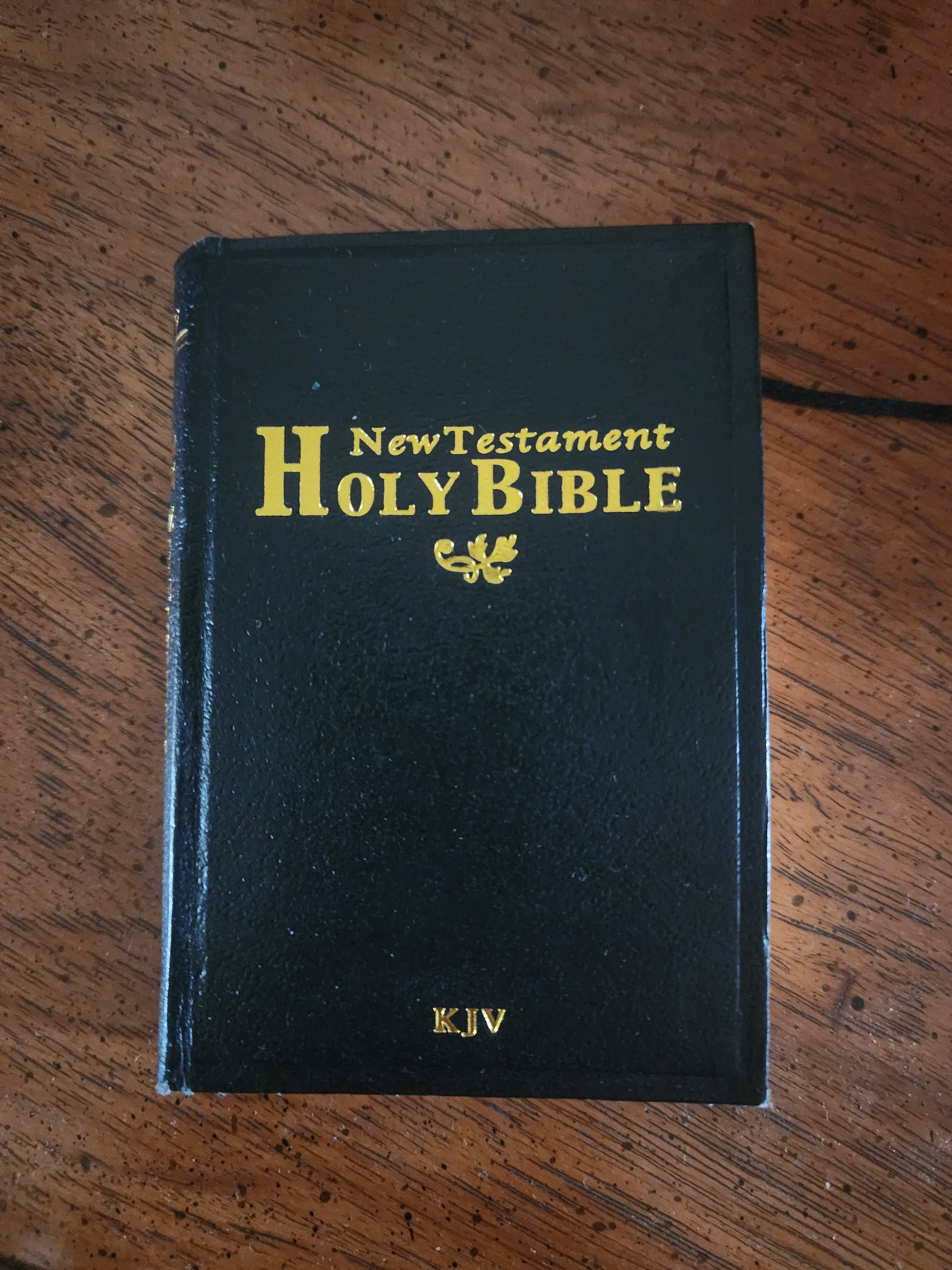
A New Testaments Holy Bible.

== See also ==
- Additional and alternative scriptures relating to Christianity
- Bible box
- Bible case
- Bible paper
- Biblical software
- Christian theology
- Code of Hammurabi
- Family Bible (book)
- International Bible Contest
- Lectionary – schedule of ceremonial Bible readings which varies by denomination
- List of major biblical figures
- List of nations mentioned in the Bible
- Theodicy and the Bible
- Typology (theology)
