= Dead Sea Scrolls =

Ancient Jewish biblical manuscripts

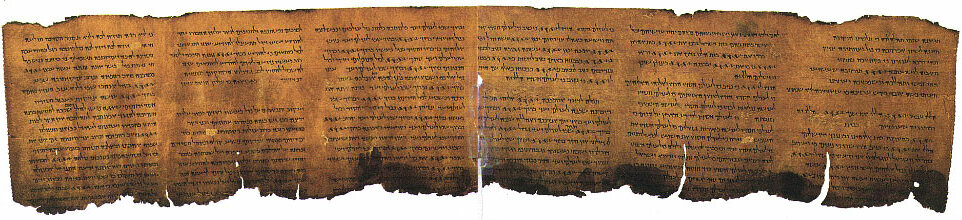
- The Great Psalms Scroll (11Q5), one of the 981 texts of the Dead Sea Scrolls
- Material: Parchment, papyrus, and copper
- Writing: Mostly Hebrew, but also Aramaic and Greek at Qumran; Latin and Arabic elsewhere
- Created: c. 3rd century BCE – 1st century CE (Qumran)
- Discovered: 1946/1947–1956
- Place: Qumran Caves near Ein Feshkha; Other Judaean Desert sites
- Present location: Israel Museum, Jerusalem; Jordan Museum, Amman
- Period: Second Temple period
- Culture: Jewish

The Dead Sea Scrolls (DSS), which mostly consist of the Qumran Caves Scrolls, are a set of ancient Jewish biblical manuscripts from the Second Temple period. They were discovered over a period of ten years, between 1946 and 1956, at the Qumran Caves near Ein Feshkha in the West Bank, on the northern shore of the Dead Sea and some nearby places. Dating from the 3rd century BCE to the 1st century CE, the Dead Sea Scrolls include the oldest surviving manuscripts of entire books later included in the various Jewish and Christian biblical canons, including deuterocanonical manuscripts from late Second Temple Judaism, as well as extrabiblical books. As such, they cast new light on the emergence of Rabbinic Judaism and of Christianity, and their relationship with Jewish religious traditions. In the wider sense, the Dead Sea Scrolls also include similar findings from elsewhere in the Judaean Desert, and are sometimes called Judaean Desert scrolls. Some of the scrolls found outside Qumran are from later centuries. Almost all of the 15,000 scrolls and scroll fragments are held in the Shrine of the Book at the Israel Museum in Jerusalem.

The Israeli government's custody of the Dead Sea Scrolls is disputed by Jordan and the Palestinian Authority on territorial, legal, and humanitarian grounds—they were mostly discovered following the Jordanian annexation of the West Bank and were acquired by Israel after Jordan lost the 1967 Arab–Israeli War—whilst Israel's claims are primarily based on historical and religious grounds, given their significance in Jewish history and in the heritage of Judaism.

Many thousands of written fragments have been discovered in the Dead Sea area – most have been published, together with the details of their discovery, in the 40-volume Discoveries in the Judaean Desert. They represent the remnants of larger manuscripts damaged by natural causes or through human interference, with the vast majority holding only small scraps of text. However, a small number of well-preserved and nearly intact manuscripts have survived—fewer than a dozen among those from the Qumran Caves. Researchers have assembled a collection of 981 different manuscripts (discovered in 1946/1947 and in 1956) from 11 caves, which lie in the immediate vicinity of the Hellenistic Jewish settlement at the site of Khirbet Qumran in the eastern Judaean Desert in the West Bank. The caves are located about 1.5 kilometres (1 mi) west of the northwestern shore of the Dead Sea, whence the scrolls derive their name. Archaeologists have long associated the scrolls with the ancient Jewish sect known as the Essenes, although some recent interpretations have challenged this connection and argue that priests in Jerusalem or other unknown Jewish groups wrote the scrolls.

Most of the manuscripts are written in Hebrew, with some written in Aramaic (for example the Son of God Text, in different regional dialects, including Nabataean) and a few in Greek. Other discoveries from the Judaean Desert add Latin (from Masada), and some later Arabic manuscripts from the 7th-8th centuries CE (from Khirbet al-Mird). Most of the texts are written on parchment, some on papyrus, and one on copper. Though scholarly consensus dates the Dead Sea Scrolls to have been made between the 3rd century BCE and the 1st century CE, there are Arabic manuscripts from associated Judaean Desert sites that are dated between the 8th and 10th century CE. Bronze coins found at the same sites form a series beginning with John Hyrcanus, a ruler of Hasmonean Judea (in office 135–104 BCE), and continuing until the period of the First Jewish–Roman War (66–73 CE), supporting the paleography and radiocarbon dating of the scrolls.

Owing to the poor condition of some of the scrolls, scholars have not identified all of their texts. The identified texts fall into three general groups:

1. About 40% are copies of texts from the canonical Hebrew scriptures.
2. Approximately 30% are texts from the Second Temple period that ultimately were not canonized in the Hebrew Bible, such as the Book of Enoch, the Book of Jubilees, the Book of Tobit, the Wisdom of Sirach, Psalms 152–155, etc.
3. The remainder (roughly 30%) are sectarian manuscripts of previously unknown documents that shed light on the rules and beliefs of a particular sect or groups within greater Judaism, such as the Community Rule, the War Scroll, the Pesher on Habakkuk, and The Rule of the Blessing.

The Dead Sea Scrolls showed that the Masoretic tradition was transmitted with remarkable overall stability from the 2nd century BCE onward, while also revealing substantial textual variation and a fluid biblical-textual tradition before standardization around 100 CE.

== Discoveries ==
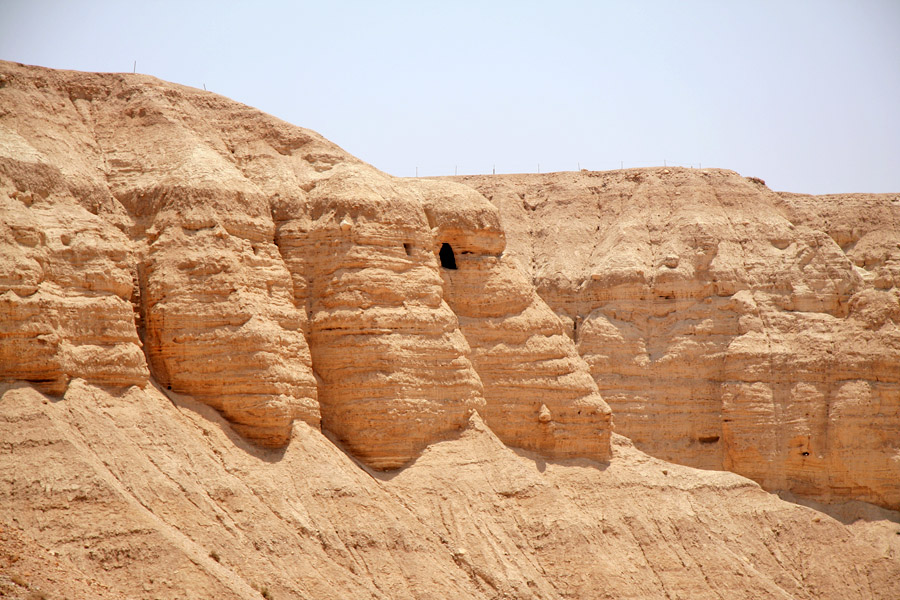
Caves at Qumran

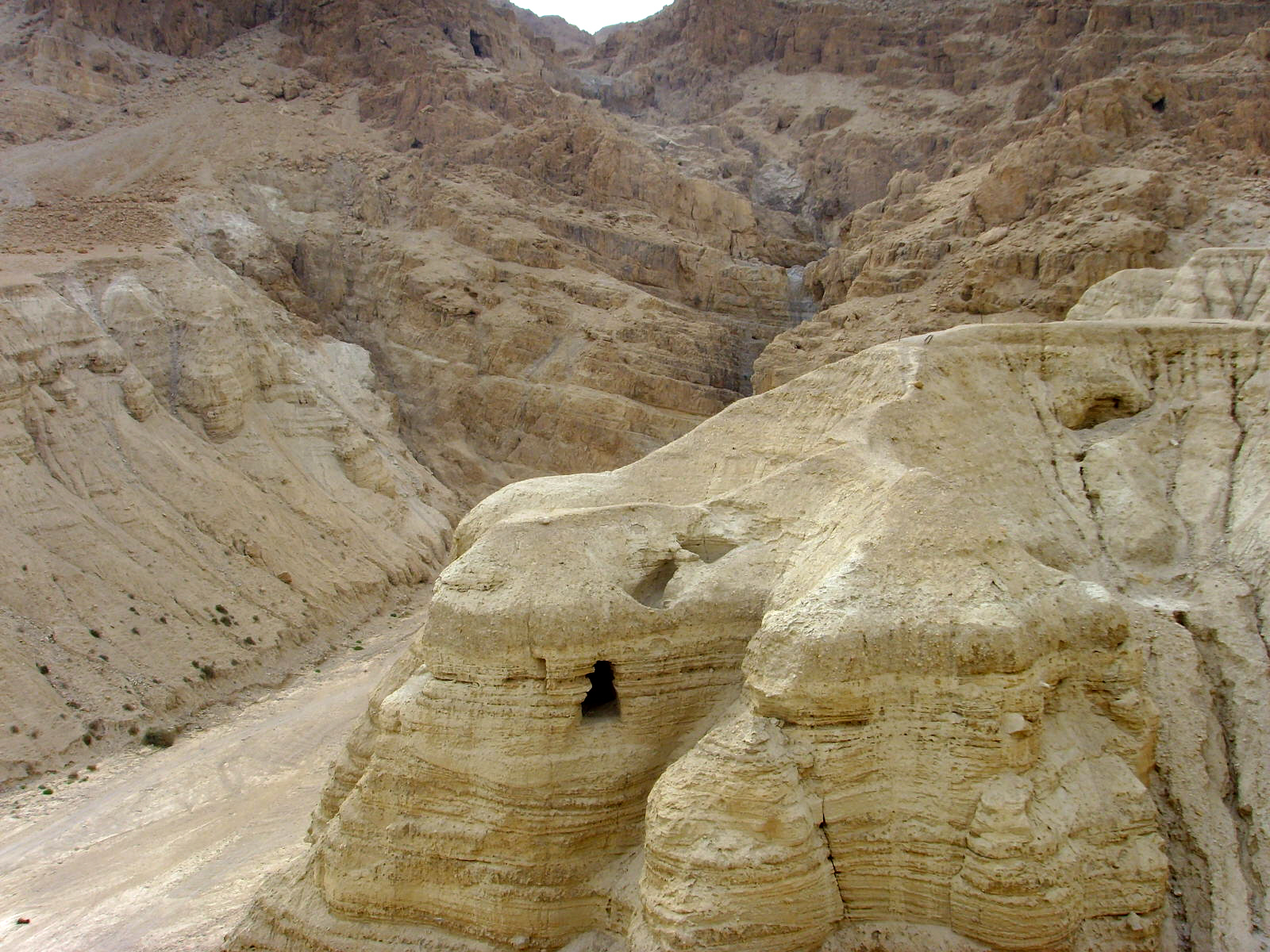
Qumran cave 4, where ninety per cent of the scrolls were found

The Dead Sea Scrolls were discovered in a series of 12 caves around the site originally known as Ein Feshkha near the Dead Sea in the West Bank (then controlled by Jordan) between 1946 and 1956 by Bedouin shepherds and a team of archaeologists. The practice of storing worn-out sacred manuscripts in earthenware vessels buried in the earth or within caves is related to the ancient Jewish custom of genizah.

=== Initial discovery (1946–1947) ===
The initial discovery by Bedouin shepherd Muhammed edh-Dhib, his cousin Jum'a Muhammed, and Khalil Musa took place between November 1946 and February 1947. The shepherds discovered seven scrolls housed in jars in a cave near what is now known as the Qumran site. John C. Trever reconstructed the story of the scrolls from several interviews with the Bedouins. Edh-Dhib's cousin noticed the caves, but edh-Dhib was the first to actually fall into one (the cave now called Cave 1). He retrieved a handful of scrolls, which Trever identifies as the Isaiah Scroll, Habakkuk Commentary, and the Community Rule, and took them back to the camp to show to his family. None of the scrolls were destroyed in this process. The Bedouins kept the scrolls hanging on a tent pole while they contemplated what they should do with them, periodically showing the scrolls to their people. At some point during this time, the Community Rule was split in two. The Bedouins first took the scrolls to a dealer named Ibrahim 'Ijha in Bethlehem. 'Ijha returned them, saying they were worthless, after being warned that they might have been stolen from a synagogue. Undaunted, the Bedouins went to a nearby market, where a Syrian Christian offered to buy them. A sheikh joined their conversation and suggested that they take the scrolls to Khalil Eskander Shahin, "Kando", a cobbler and part-time antiques dealer. The Bedouins and the dealers returned to the site, leaving one scroll with Kando and selling three others to a dealer for seven Jordanian pounds (approximately $28, or $404 in 2025 dollars). The original scrolls continued to change hands after the Bedouins left them in the possession of a third party until a sale could be arranged.

In 1947 the original seven scrolls caught the attention of Trever of the American Schools of Oriental Research (ASOR), who compared the script in the scrolls to the Nash Papyrus, the oldest biblical manuscript then known, and found similarities between them. In March the 1948 Arab–Israeli War prompted the move of some of the scrolls to Beirut, Lebanon, for safekeeping. On 11 April 1948, Millar Burrows, head of the ASOR, announced the discovery of the scrolls in a general press release.

=== Search for the Qumran caves (1948–1949) ===
Early in September 1948, Metropolitan bishop Mar Samuel brought some additional scroll fragments that he had acquired to professor Ovid R. Sellers, the succeeding director of ASOR. By the end of 1948, nearly two years after the discovery of the scrolls, scholars had yet to locate the original cave where the fragments had been found. With unrest in the country at that time, no large-scale search could be safely undertaken. Professor Ovid Sellers tried to persuade the Syrians to assist in the search for the cave, but he was unable to pay their price. In early 1949, the government of Jordan granted permission to the Arab Legion to search the area in which the original Qumran cave was believed to exist. Consequently, Cave 1 was rediscovered on 28 January 1949 by Belgian United Nations observer captain Phillipe Lippens and Arab Legion captain Akkash el-Zebn.

=== Qumran caves rediscovery and new scroll discoveries (1949–1951) ===
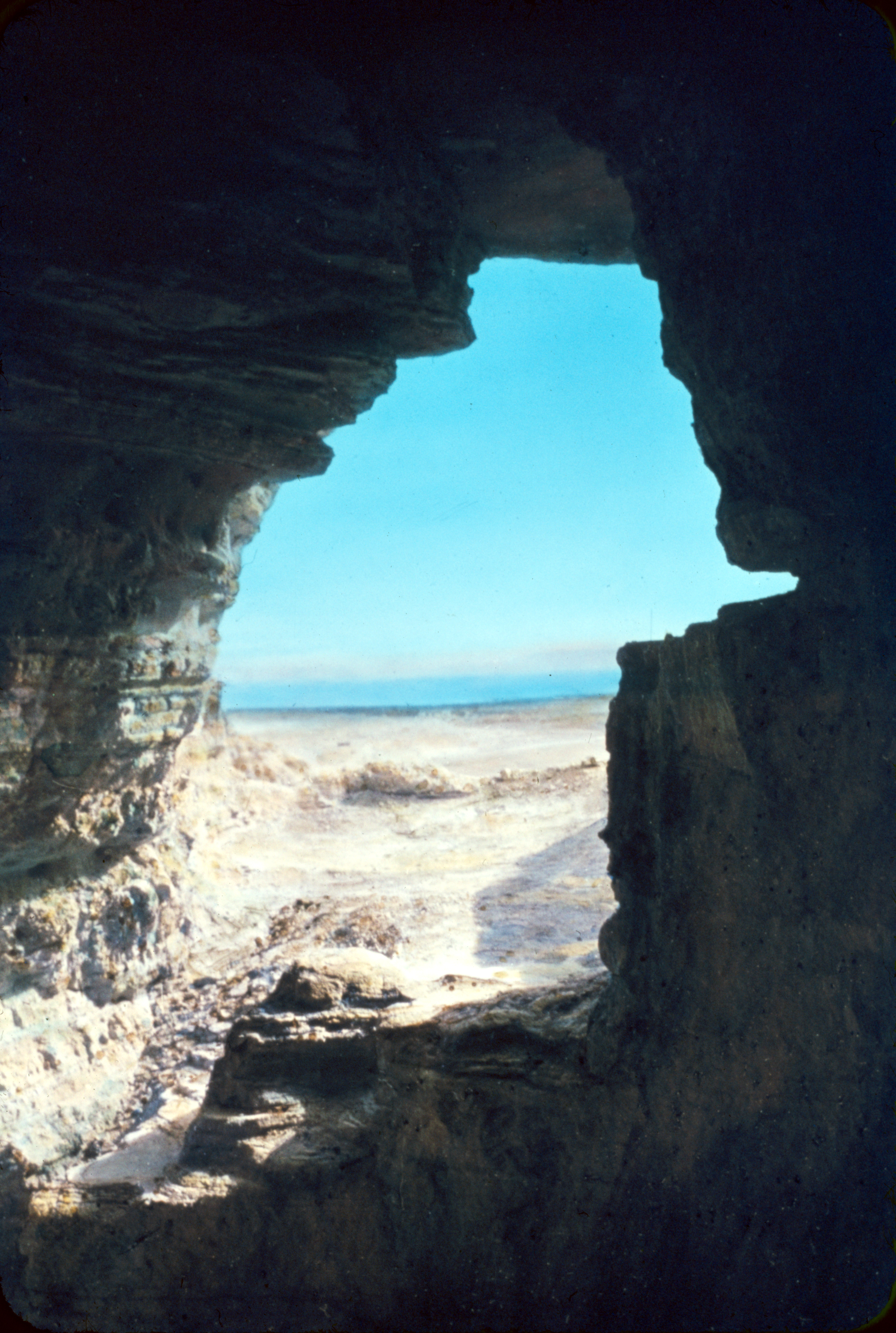
A view of the Dead Sea from a cave at Qumran in which some of the Dead Sea Scrolls were discovered

The rediscovery of what became known as Cave 1 at Qumran prompted the initial excavation of the site from 15 February to 5 March 1949 by the Jordanian Department of Antiquities, led by Gerald Lankester Harding and Roland de Vaux. The Cave 1 site yielded discoveries of additional Dead Sea Scroll fragments, linen cloth, jars, and other artefacts.

=== Excavations of Qumran and new cave discoveries (1951–1956, 2017, 2021) ===
In November 1951, de Vaux and his team from the ASOR began a full excavation of Qumran. By February 1952, the Bedouins had discovered 30 fragments in what was to be designated Cave 2. The discovery of a second cave eventually yielded 300 fragments from 33 manuscripts, including fragments of Jubilees and the Wisdom of Sirach written in Hebrew. The following month, on 14 March 1952, the ASOR team discovered a third cave with fragments of Jubilees and the Copper Scroll. Between September and December 1952, the fragments and scrolls of Caves 4, 5, and 6 were discovered by the ASOR teams.

With the monetary value of the scrolls rising as their historical significance was made more public, the Bedouins and the ASOR archaeologists accelerated their search for the scrolls separately in the same general area of Qumran, which was more than one kilometre in length. Between 1953 and 1956, de Vaux led four more archaeological expeditions in the area to uncover scrolls and artefacts. Cave 11 was discovered in 1956 and yielded the last fragments to be found in the vicinity of Qumran.

Caves 4–10 are clustered in an area lying in relative proximity 150 m (160 yd) from Khirbet Qumran, while caves 1, 2, 3 and 11 are located 1 mile (1–2 kilometres) north, with Cave 3 the most remote. In February 2017, Hebrew University archaeologists announced the discovery of a new 12th cave. There was one blank parchment found in a jar, but broken and empty scroll jars and pickaxes suggest that the cave was looted in the 1950s.

In March 2021, Israeli archaeologists announced the discovery of dozens of fragments bearing biblical text, written in Greek, from the books of Zechariah and Nahum. This group of findings is believed to have been hidden in a cave between 132 and 136 CE during the Bar Kokhba Revolt. However, a 10,500-year-old basket made of woven reeds was also discovered in the Muraba'at caves in the Nahal Darga Reserve. Other discoveries included the remains of a child wrapped in cloth dated to around 6,000 years ago, and a cache of coins from the days of the Bar Kokhba Revolt. In 2021, more scrolls were discovered by Israeli authorities in a different cave near the Dead Sea called the Cave of Horrors.

=== Tefillin strips rediscovered (2014) ===
Nine tiny Tefillin strips were rediscovered by the IAA in 2014, after they had been stored unopened for six decades following their excavation in 1952.

== Qumran caves and their contents ==
The Isaiah Scroll (1QIsa^{a}) contains almost the whole Book of Isaiah.

The 972 manuscripts found at Qumran were found primarily in two separate formats: as scrolls and as fragments of previous scrolls and texts. In the fourth cave the fragments were torn into up to 15,000 pieces. These small fragments created somewhat of a problem for scholars. G.L. Harding, director of the Jordanian Department of Antiquities, began working on piecing the fragments together but did not finish this before his death in 1979.

Cave 1

Wadi Qumran Cave 1 was discovered for the first time in 1946. The original seven Dead Sea Scrolls from Cave 1 are the Great Isaiah Scroll (1QIsa^{a}), a second copy of Isaiah (1QIsa^{b}), the Community Rule Scroll (1QS), the Pesher on Habakkuk (1QpHab), the War Scroll (1QM), the Thanksgiving Hymns (1QH), and the Genesis Apocryphon (1QapGen). One of the pottery jars containing the scrolls from Cave 1 is now kept in the British Museum.

Cave 2

Wadi Qumran Cave 2 was discovered in February 1952 in which the Bedouins discovered 30 fragments. The cave eventually yielded 300 fragments from 33 manuscripts of Dead Sea Scrolls, including fragments of Jubilees and the Wisdom of Sirach written in Hebrew.

Cave 3

Wadi Qumran Cave 3 was discovered on 14 March 1952 by the ASOR team. The cave initially yielded fragments of Jubilees and the Copper Scroll.

Caves 4a and 4b

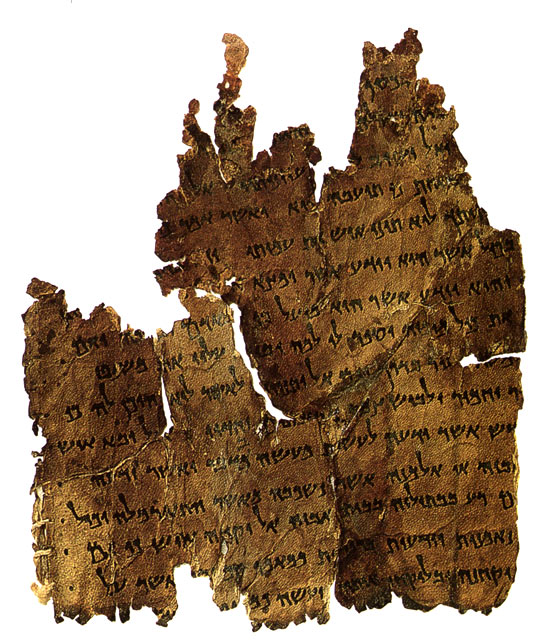
The Damascus Document Scroll, 4Q271D^{f}, found in Cave 4

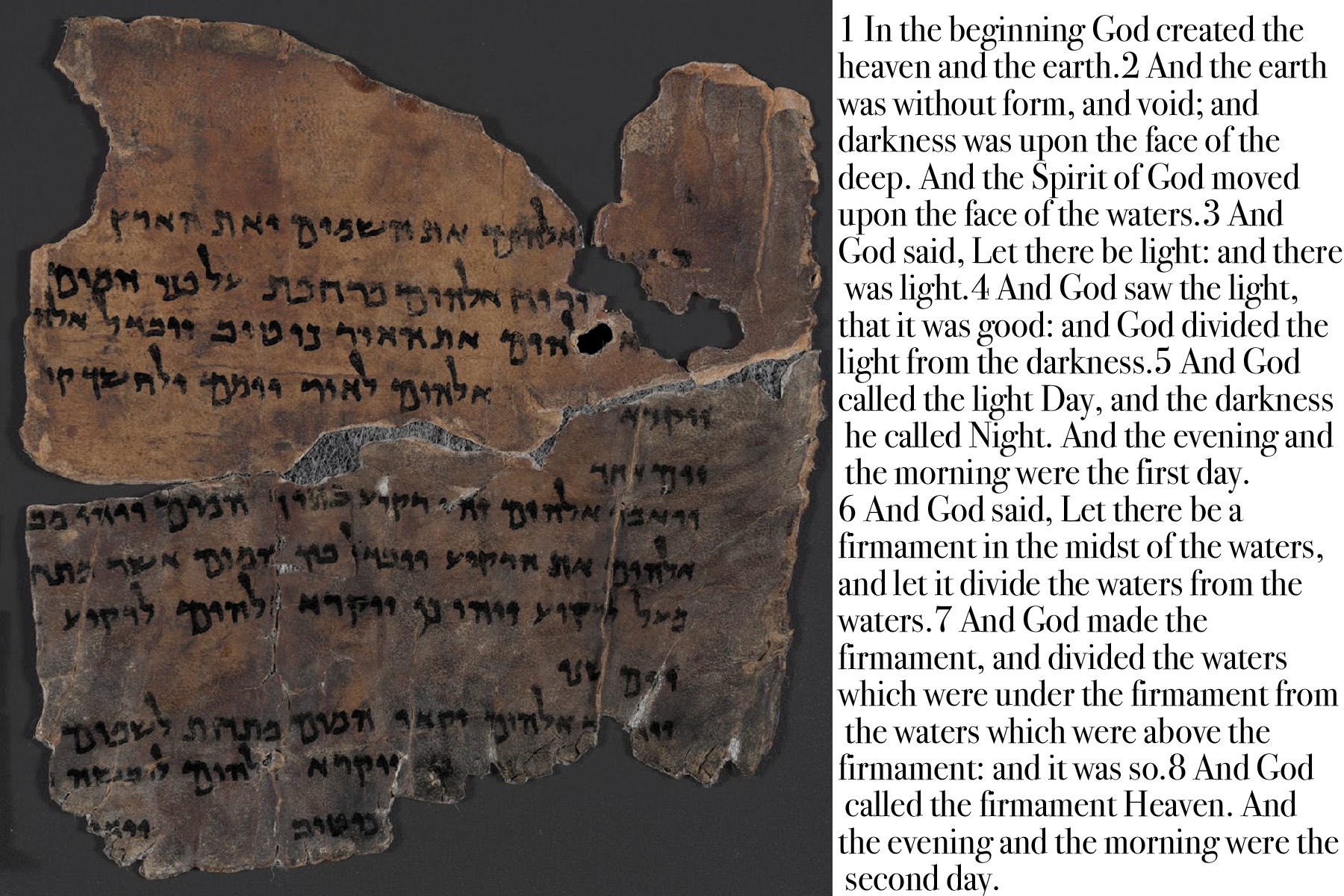
4Q7, a fragment of the book of Genesis found in Cave 4

Wadi Qumran Cave 4 was discovered in August 1952 and was excavated from 22 to 29 September 1952 by Harding, de Vaux, and Józef Milik. Cave 4 is actually two hand-cut caves (4a and 4b), but since the fragments were mixed they are labelled as 4Q. Cave 4 is the most famous of Qumran caves both because of its visibility from the Qumran plateau and its productivity. It is visible from the plateau to the south of the Qumran settlement. It is by far the most productive of all Qumran caves, producing 90% of the Dead Sea Scrolls and scroll fragments (approx. 15,000 fragments from 500 different texts), including 9–10 copies of Jubilees, along with 21 tefillin and 7 mezuzot.

Cave 5

Wadi Qumran Cave 5 was discovered in 1952, shortly after the discovery of Cave 4. Cave 5 produced approximately 25 manuscripts.

Cave 6

Wadi Qumran Cave 6 was discovered alongside Cave 5 in 1952, shortly after the discovery of Cave 4. Cave 6 contained fragments of about 31 manuscripts.

Cave 7

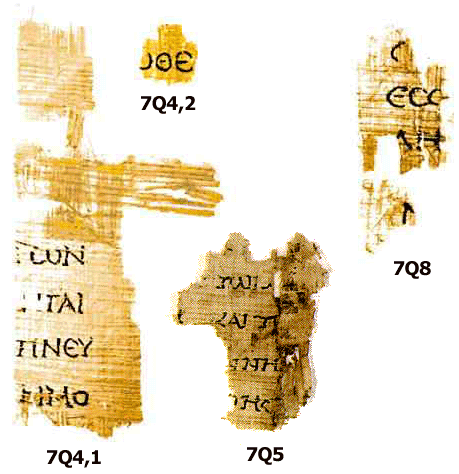
Dead Sea Scroll fragments 7Q4, 7Q5, and 7Q8 from Cave 7 in Qumran, written on papyrus

Wadi Qumran Cave 7 yielded fewer than 20 fragments of Greek documents, including 7Q2 (the "Letter of Jeremiah" = Baruch 6), 7Q5 (which became the subject of much speculation in later decades), and a Greek copy of a scroll of Enoch. Cave 7 also produced several inscribed potsherds and jars.

Cave 8

Wadi Qumran Cave 8, along with caves 7 and 9, is one of the only caves that are accessible by passing through the settlement at Qumran. Carved into the southern end of the Qumran plateau, cave 8 was excavated by archaeologists in 1957. Cave 8 produced five fragments: Genesis (8QGen), Psalms (8QPs), a tefillin fragment (8QPhyl), a mezuzah (8QMez), and a hymn (8QHymn). Cave 8 also produced several tefillin cases, a box of leather objects, many lamps, jars, and the sole of a leather shoe.

Cave 9

Wadi Qumran Cave 9, along with caves 7 and 8, was one of the only caves that are accessible by passing through the settlement at Qumran. Carved into the southern end of the Qumran plateau, Cave 9 was excavated by archaeologists in 1957. There was only one manuscript fragment found in Cave 9.

Cave 10

In Qumran Cave 10 archaeologists found two ostraca with writing on them, along with an unknown symbol on a grey stone slab.

Cave 11

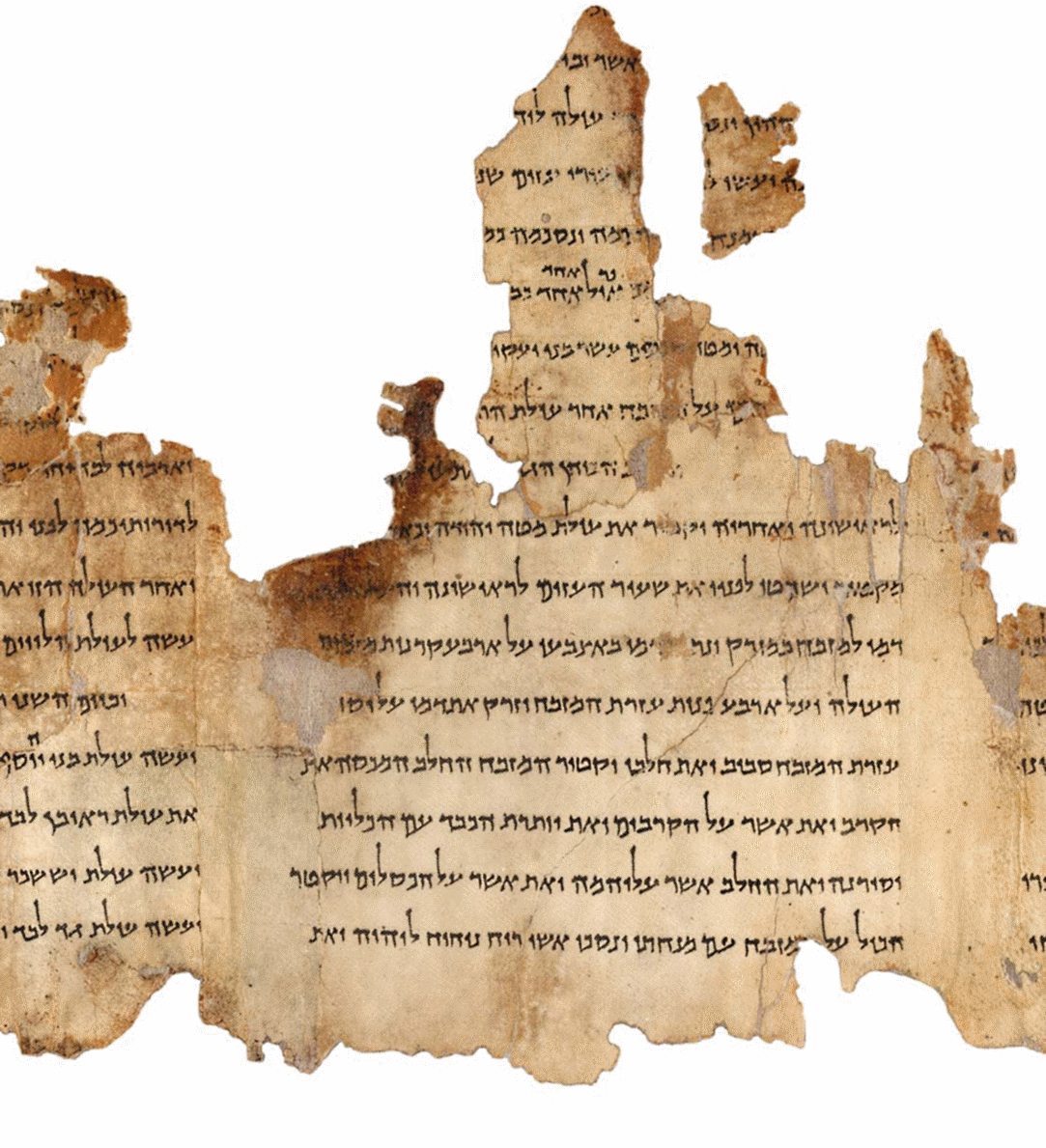
A view of part of the Temple Scroll that was found in Qumran Cave 11

Wadi Qumran Cave 11 was discovered in 1956 and yielded 21 texts of the Dead Sea Scrolls, some of which were quite lengthy. The Temple Scroll, so called because more than half of it pertains to the construction of the Temple of Jerusalem, was found in Cave 11 and is by far the longest scroll. It is 26.7 feet (8.15 m) long; its original length may have been over 28 feet (8.75 m). The Temple Scroll was regarded by scholar Yigael Yadin as "The Torah According to the Essenes". On the other hand, Hartmut Stegemann, a contemporary and friend of Yadin, believes the scroll was not to be regarded as such but was a document without exceptional significance. Stegemann notes that it is not mentioned or cited in any known Essene writing.

An eschatological fragment about the biblical figure Melchizedek (11Q13) was found in Cave 11. Cave 11 also produced a copy of Jubilees, and a proto-Masoretic text of the Torah scroll (only a fragment of the Book of Leviticus surviving), known as the Paleo-Hebrew Leviticus Scroll. According to former chief editor of the Dead Sea Scrolls editorial team John Strugnell, there are at least four privately owned scrolls from Cave 11 that have not yet been made available for scholars. Among them is a complete Aramaic manuscript of the Book of Enoch.

Cave 12

Cave 12 was discovered in February 2017 on cliffs west of Qumran, near the north-western shore of the Dead Sea. Archaeological examination found pickaxes and empty broken scroll jars, indicating that the cave had been discovered and looted in the 1950s. One of the joint Hebrew University of Jerusalem and Liberty University project's lead researchers, Oren Gutfeld, stated, "Although at the end of the day no scroll was found, and instead we 'only' found a piece of parchment rolled up in a jug that was being processed for writing, the findings indicate beyond any doubt that the cave contained scrolls that were stolen."

Fragments with unknown provenance

Some fragments of scrolls have neither significant archaeological provenance nor records that reveal in which designated Qumran cave area they were found. They are believed to have come from Wadi Qumran caves but are just as likely to have come from other archaeological sites in the Judaean Desert area. These fragments have therefore been designated to the temporary "X" series.

Fragment/Scroll #	Fragment/Scroll Name	KJV Bible Association	Description
XQ1-3	"Tefillin from Qumran"	Deuteronomy 5:1–6:3; 10:12–11:12.	First published in 1969; Phylacteries
XQ4	"Tefillin from Qumran"		Phylacteries
XQ5^{a}	Jubilees 7:4–5		
XQ5^{b}	Hymn		
XQ6	Offering		Small fragment with only one word in Aramaic.
XQ7	Unidentified fragment		Strong possibility that it is part of 4QInstruction.
XQpapEn	Book of Enoch 9:1		One small fragment written in Hebrew. = XQ8

=== Gallery ===
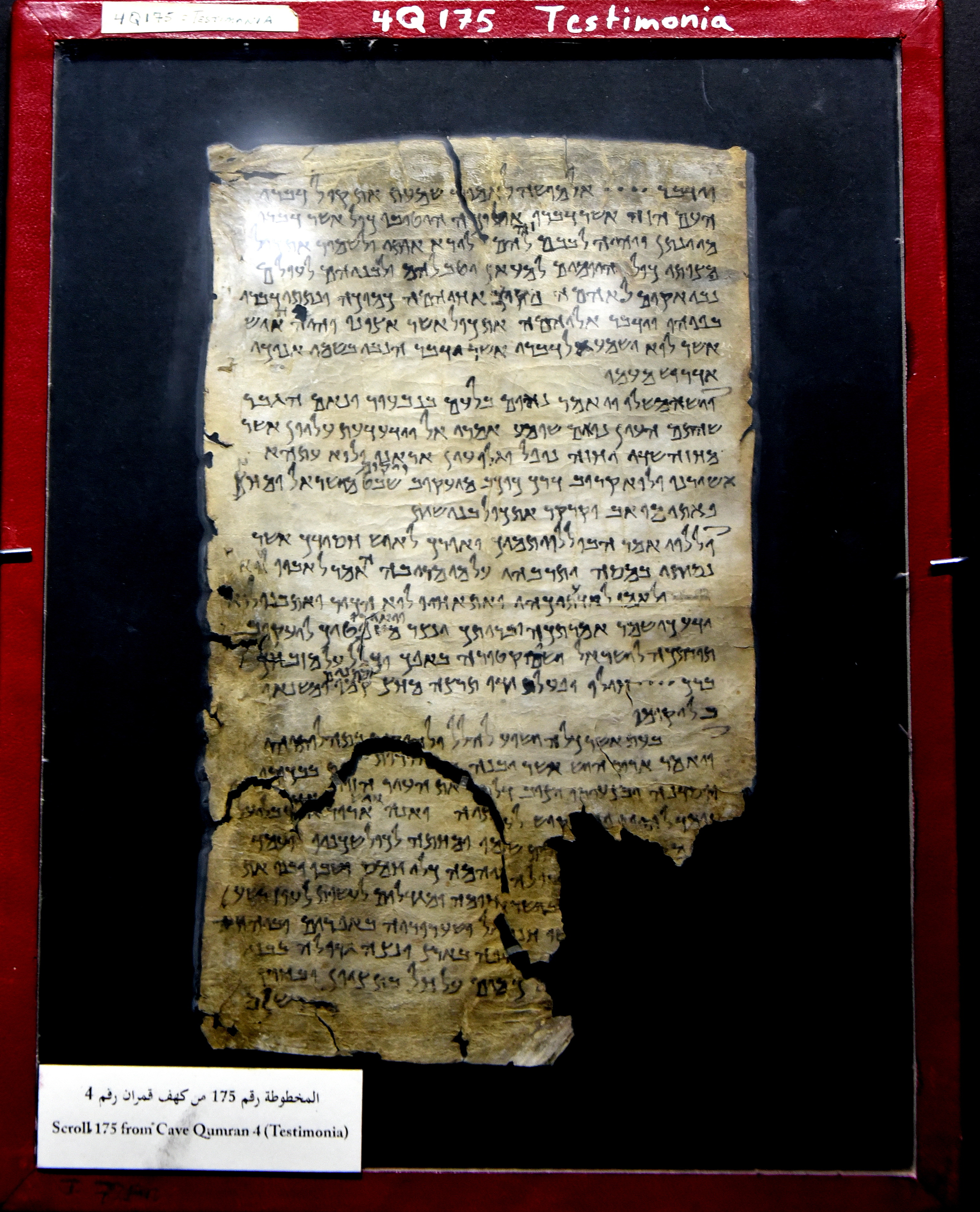
Dead Sea Scroll 175, complete, Testimonia, from Qumran Cave 4, the Jordan Museum in Amman

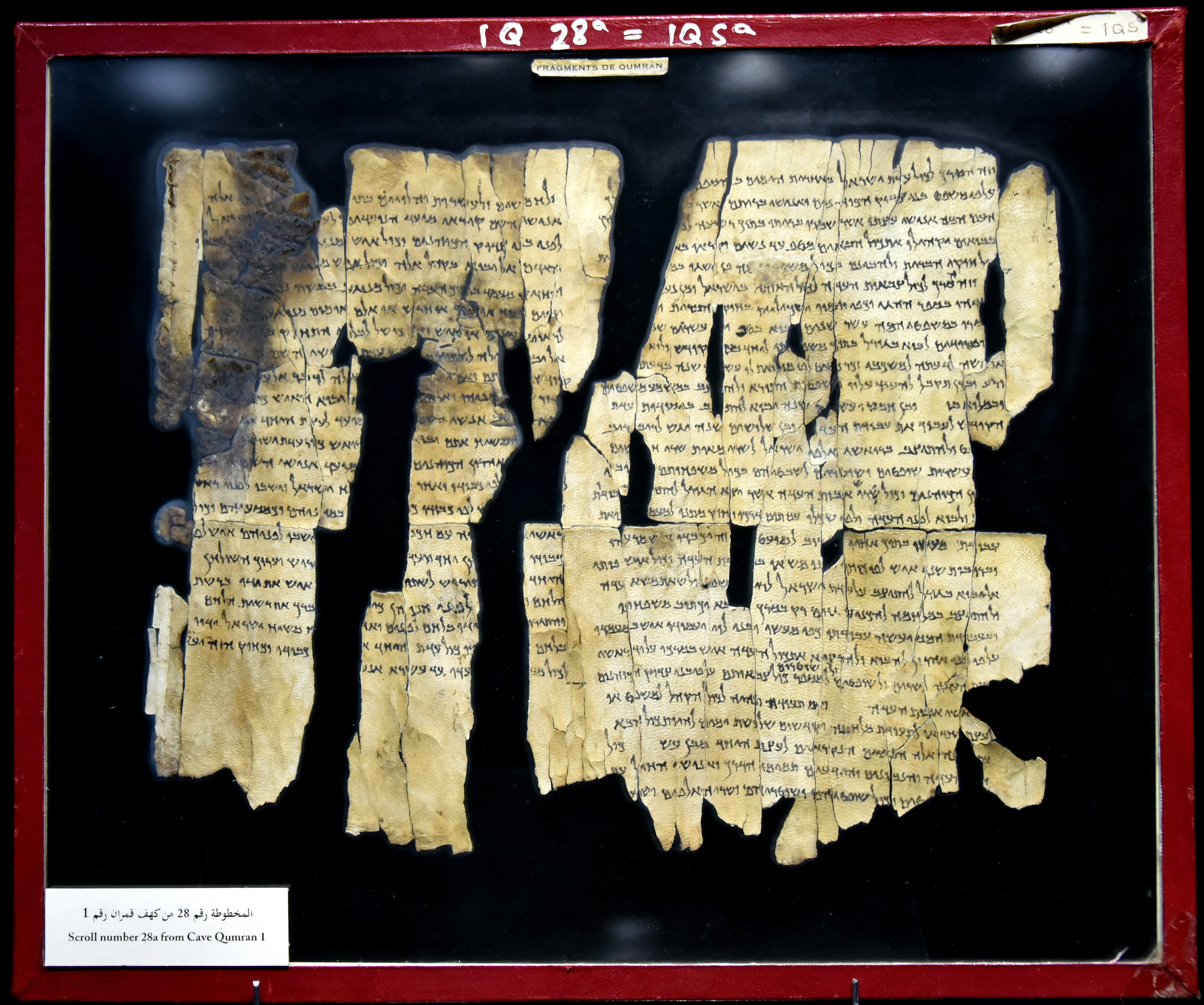
Dead Sea Scroll 28a from Qumran Cave 1, complete, the Jordan Museum in Amman

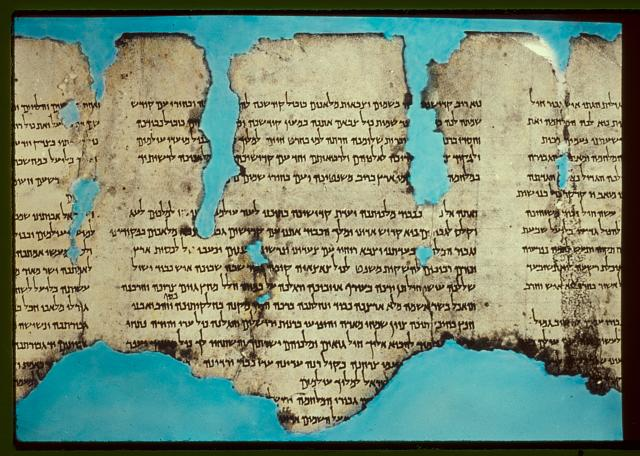
The War Scroll, found in Qumran Cave 1.

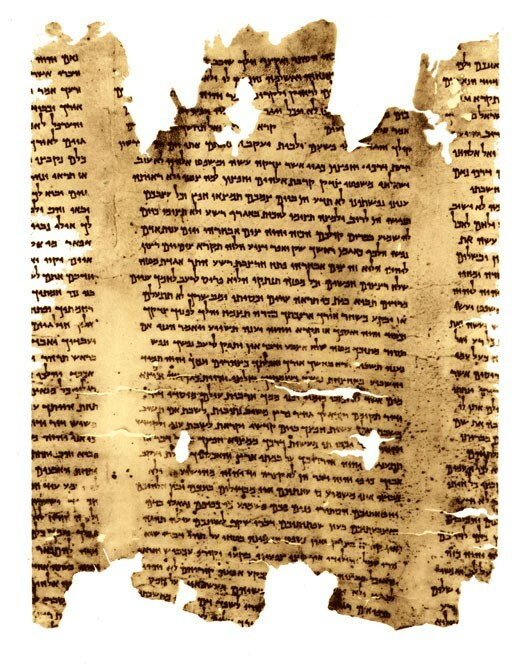
A portion of the second discovered copy of the Isaiah Scroll, 1QIsa^{b}.

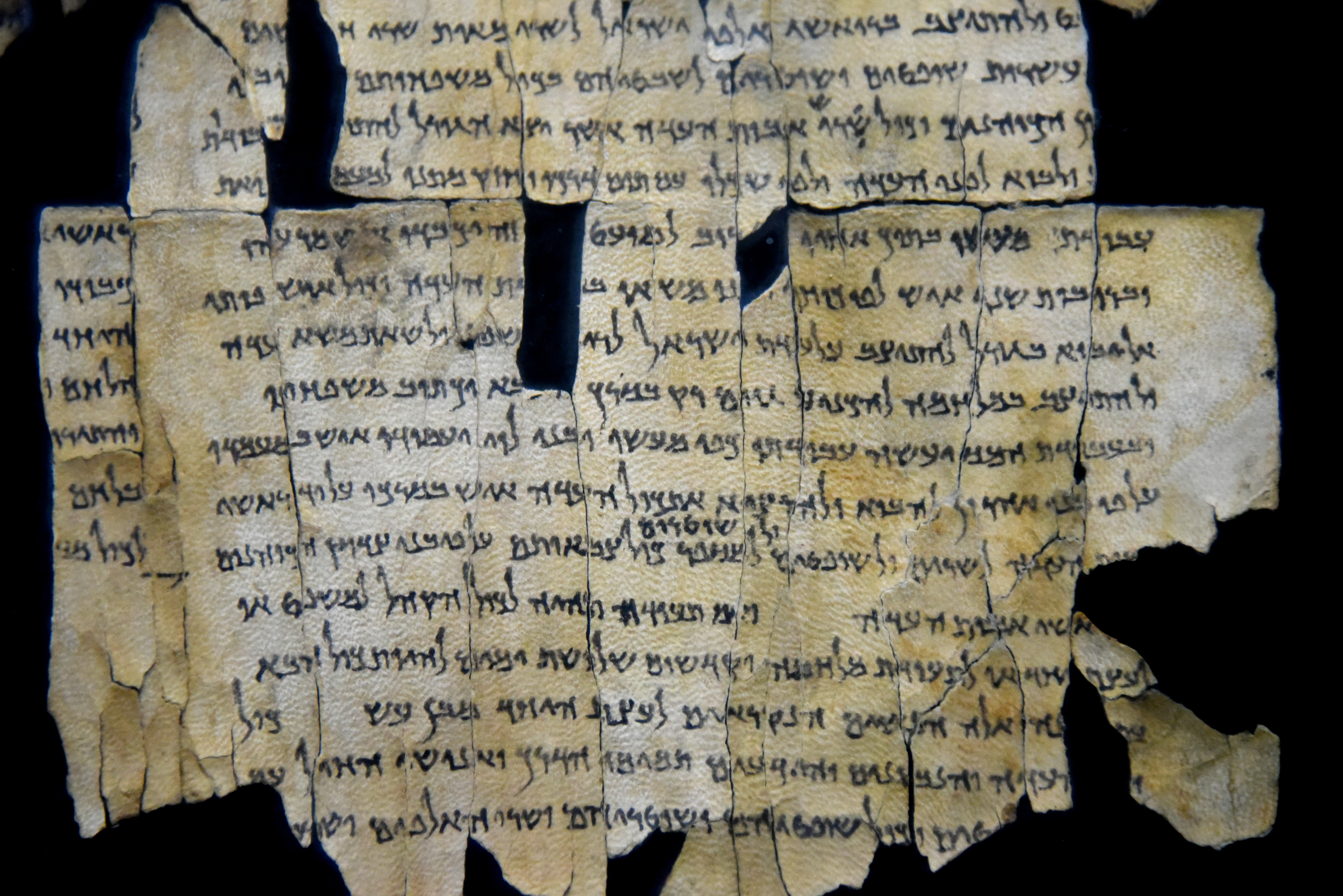
Part of Dead Sea Scroll 28a from Qumran Cave 1. The Jordan Museum, Amman

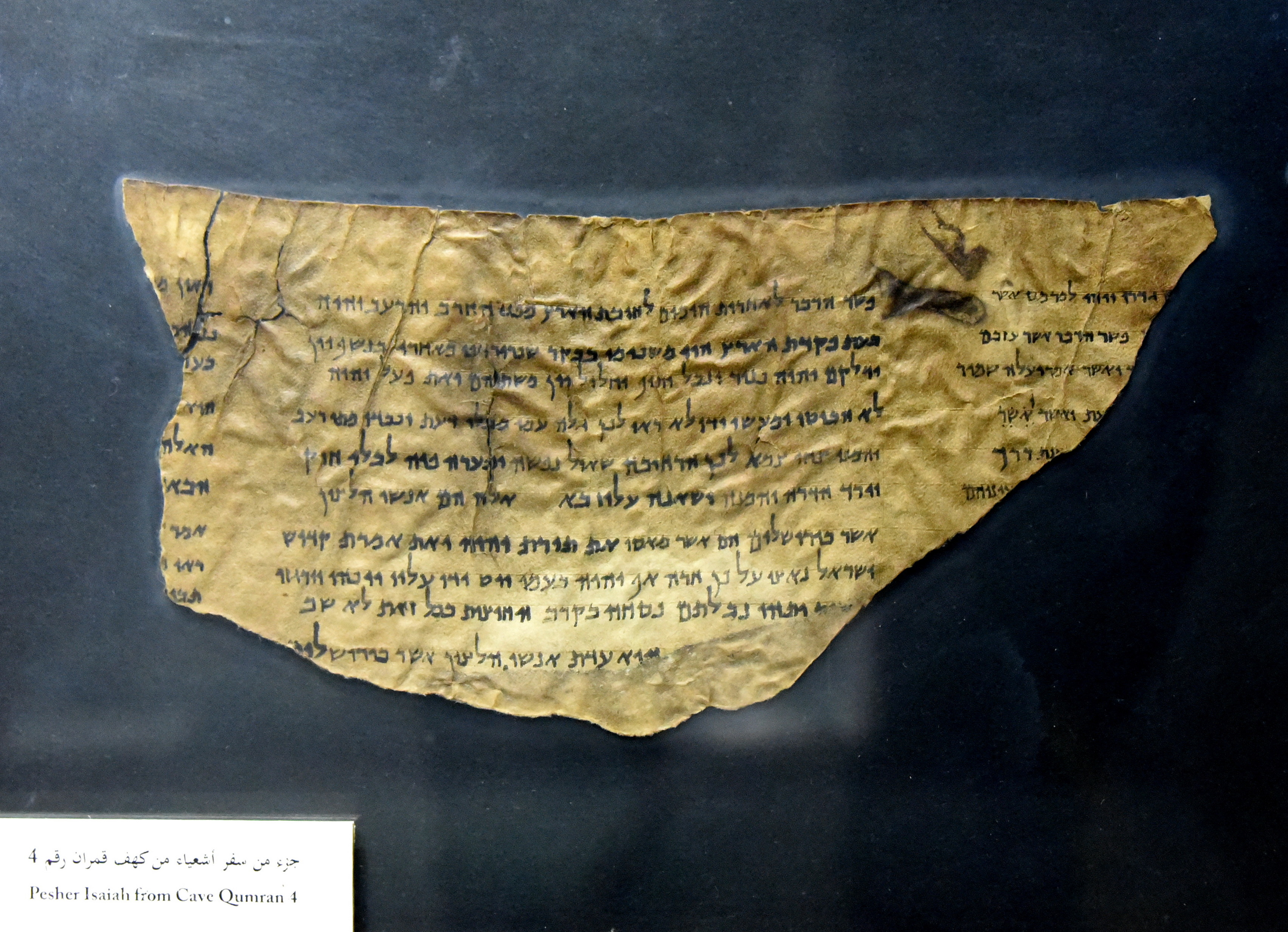
Dead Sea Scroll, Pesher Isaiah, from Qumran Cave 4. The Jordan Museum, Amman

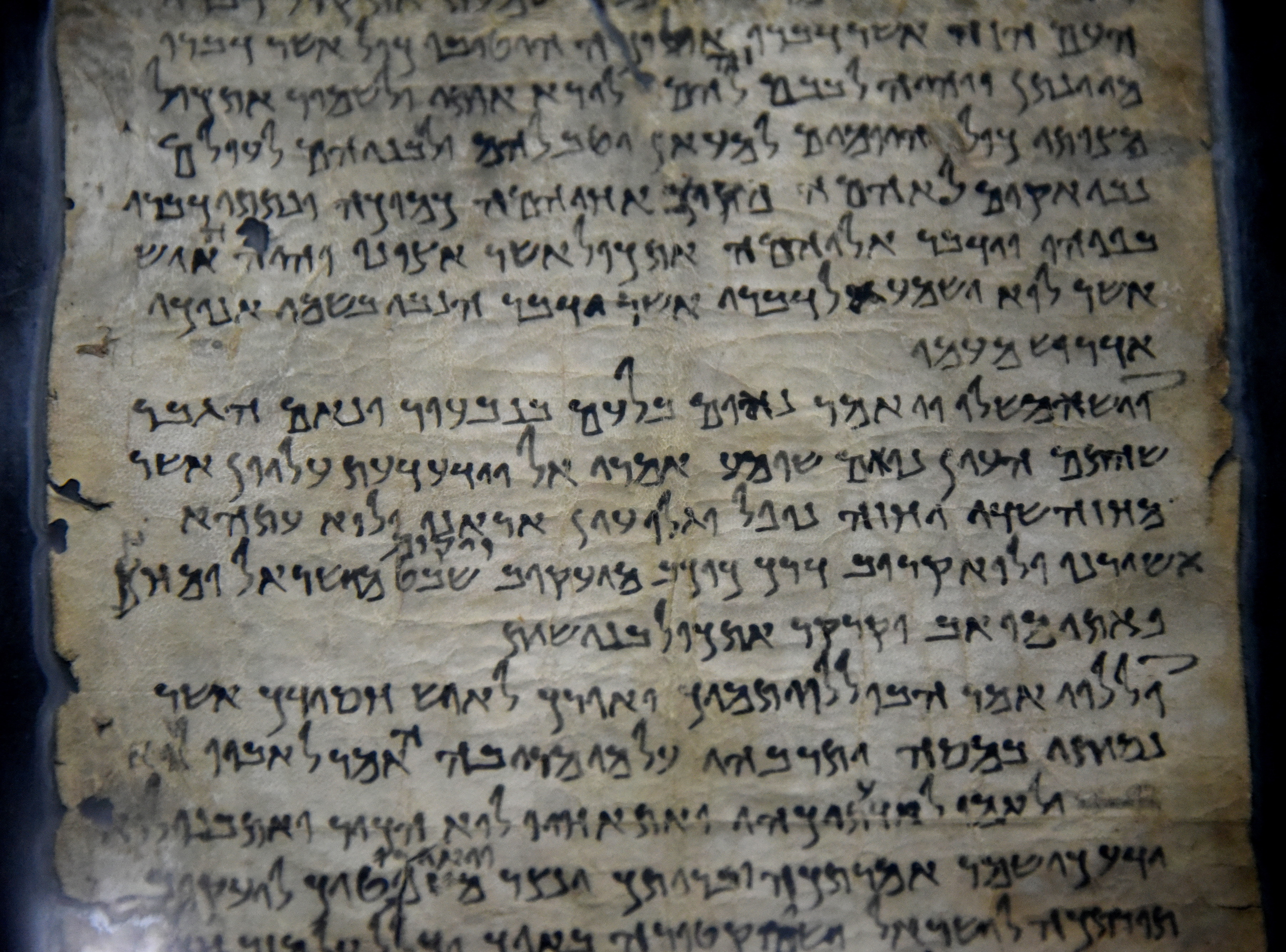
Dead Sea Scroll 175, Testimonia, from Qumran Cave 4. The Jordan Museum, Amman

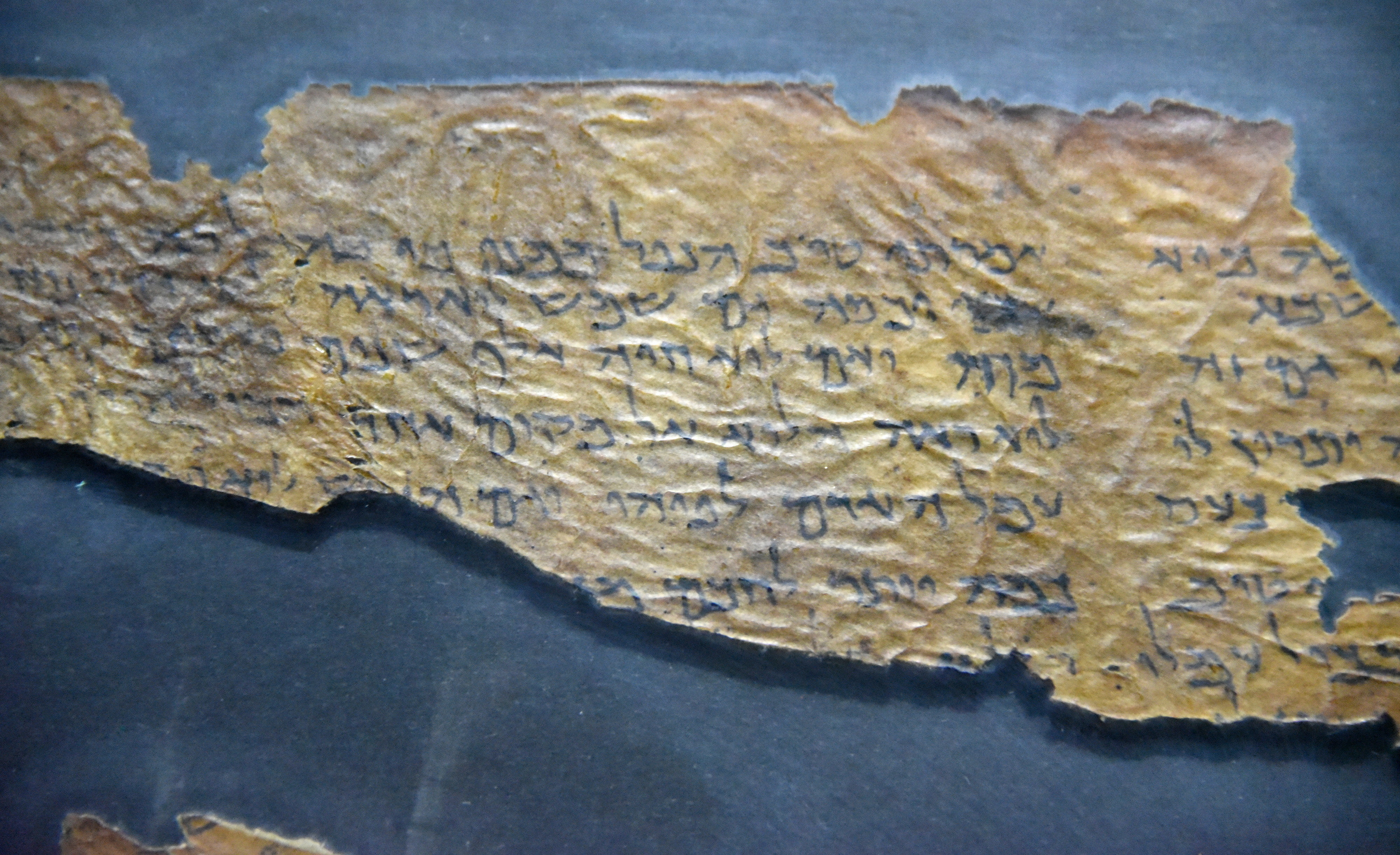
Dead Sea Scroll 109, Qohelet or Ecclesiastes, from Qumran Cave 4. The Jordan Museum, Amman

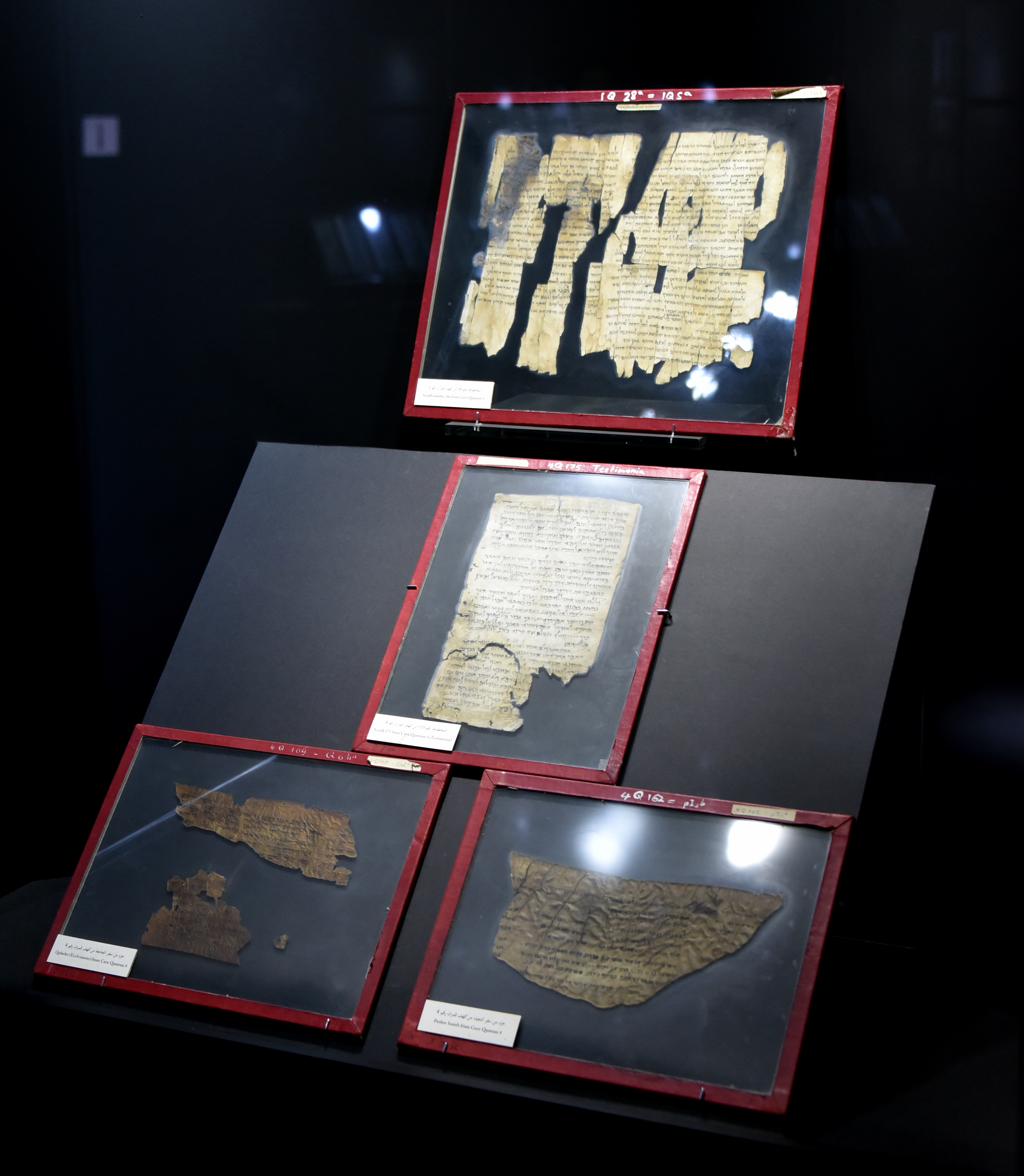
Dead Sea Scrolls at the Jordan Museum in Amman

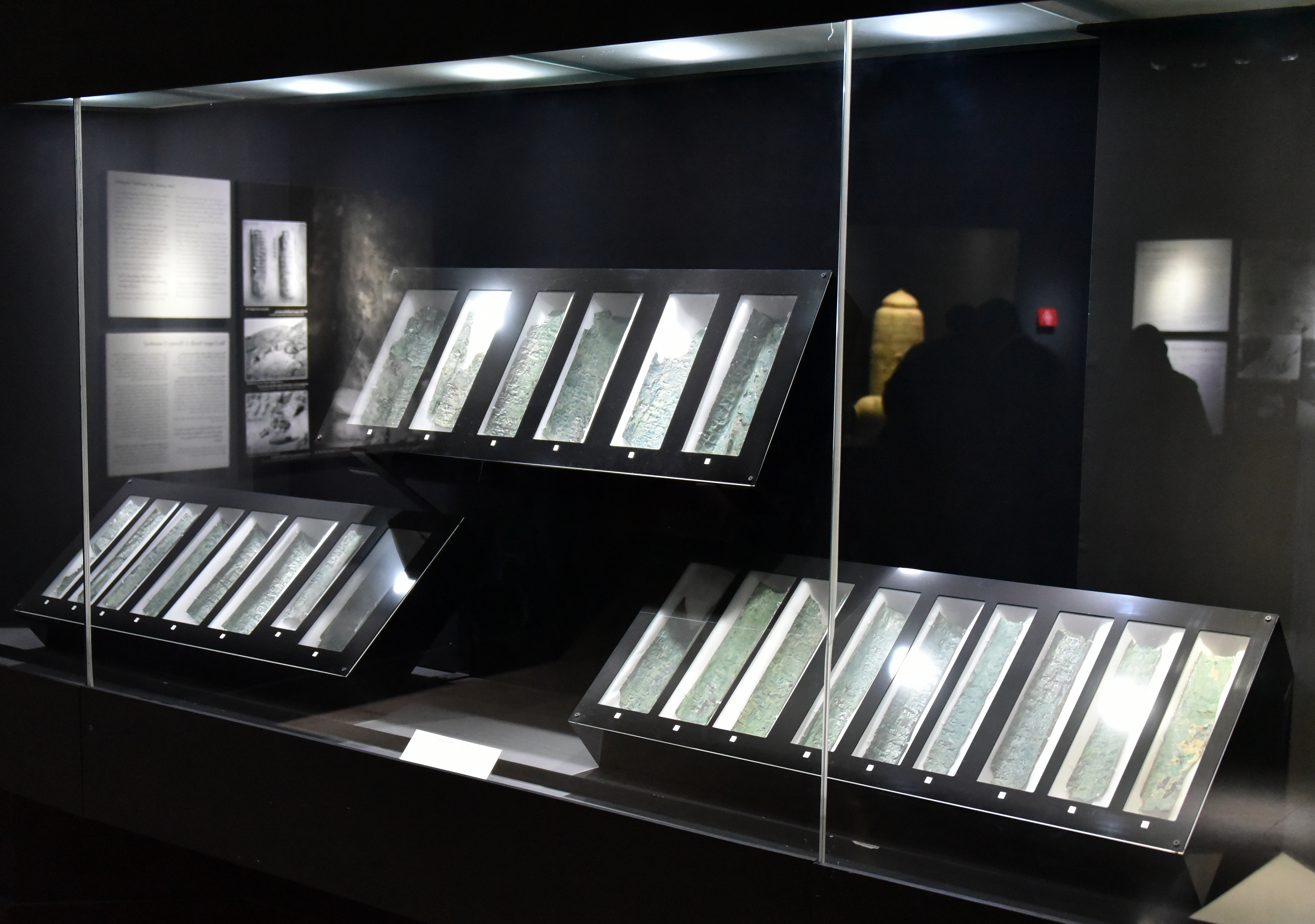
Strips of the Copper Dead Sea Scroll at the Jordan Museum, from Qumran Cave 3, 1st century CE

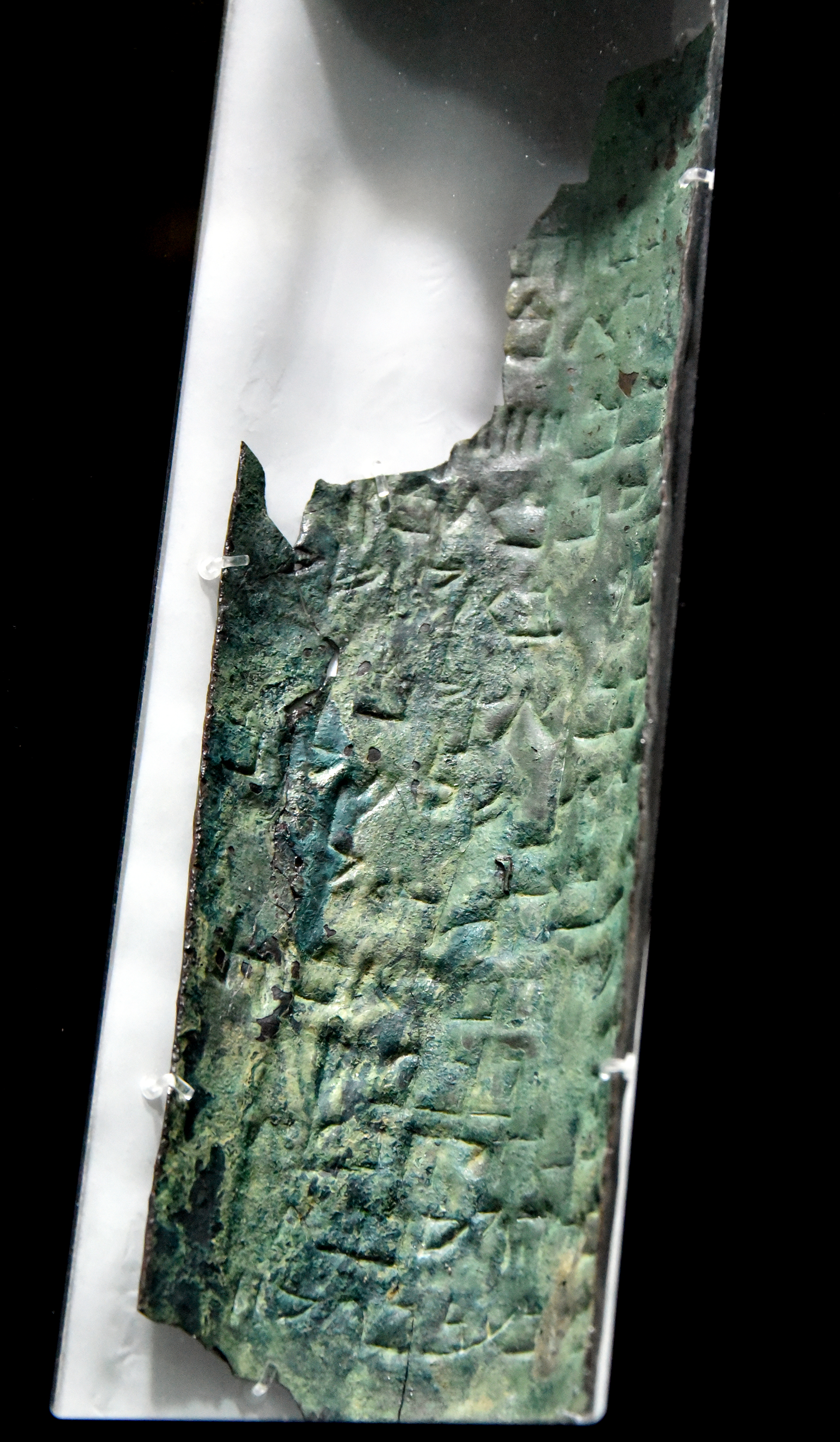
Strip 11 of the Copper Dead Sea Scroll, from Qumran Cave 3, Jordan Museum

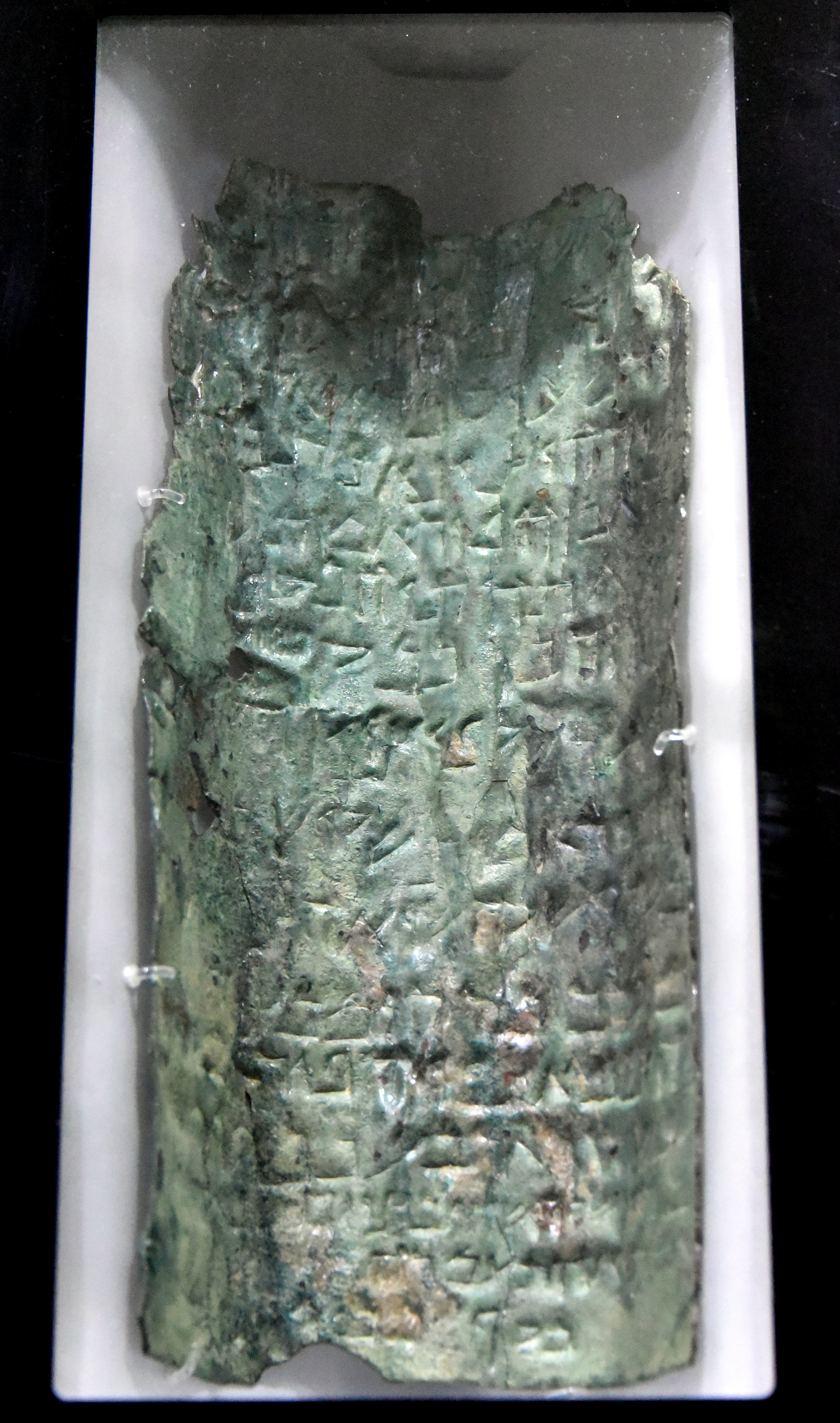
Strip 15 of the Copper Dead Sea Scroll, from Qumran Cave 3, Jordan Museum

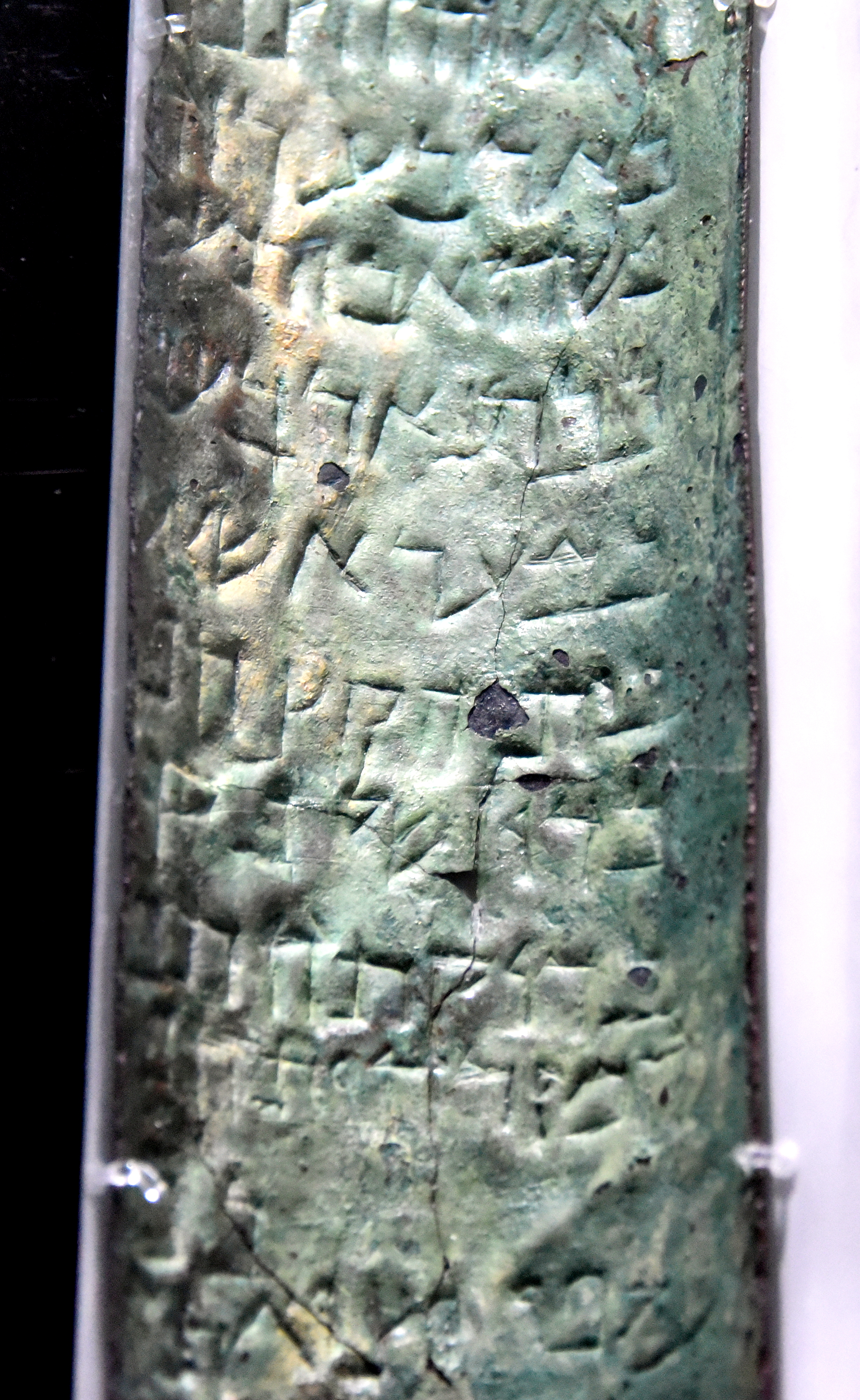
Strip 13 of the Copper Dead Sea Scroll, from Qumran Cave 3, Jordan Museum

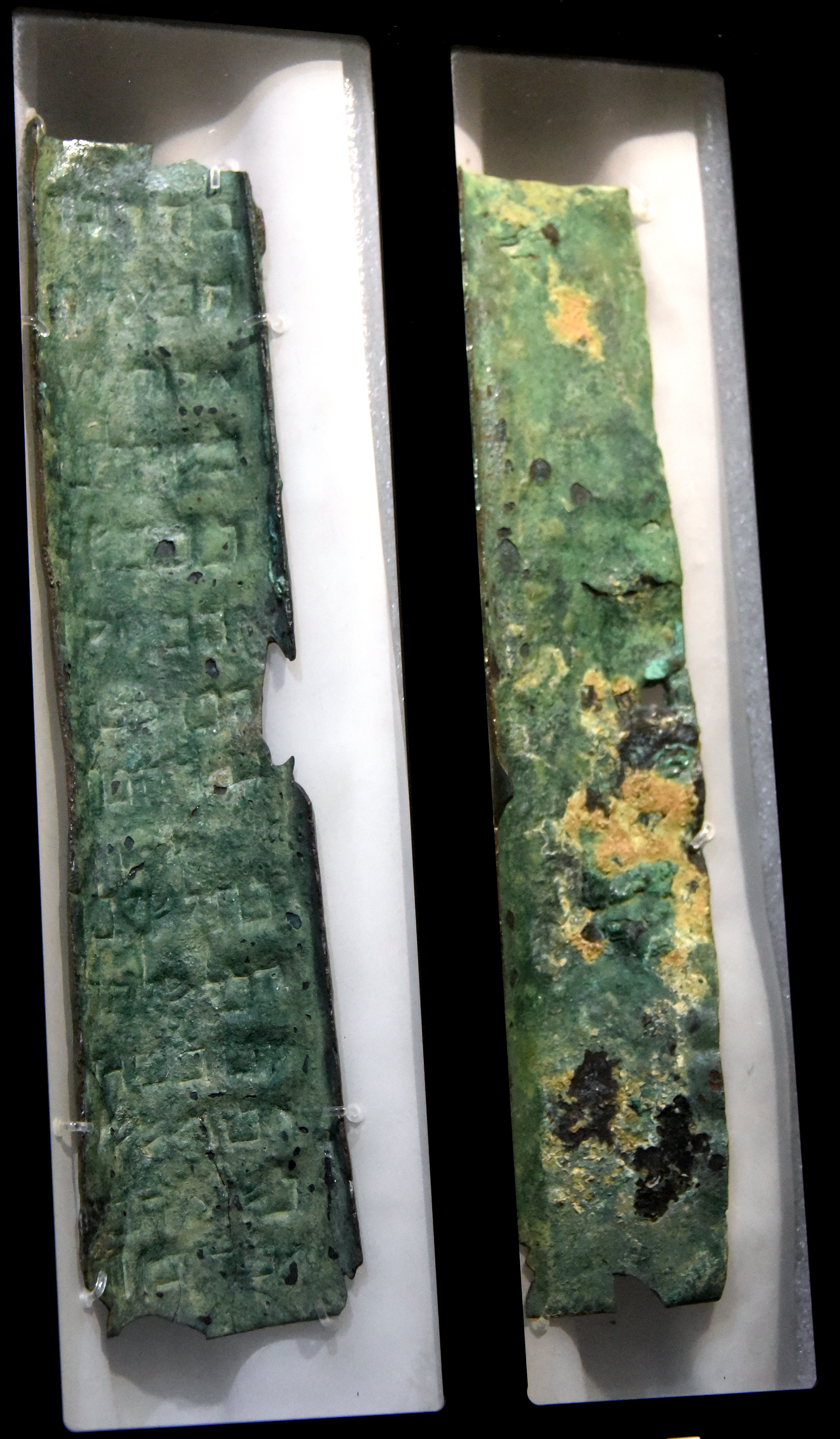
Strips 1 and 2 of the Copper Dead Sea Scroll, from Qumran Cave 3, Jordan Museum

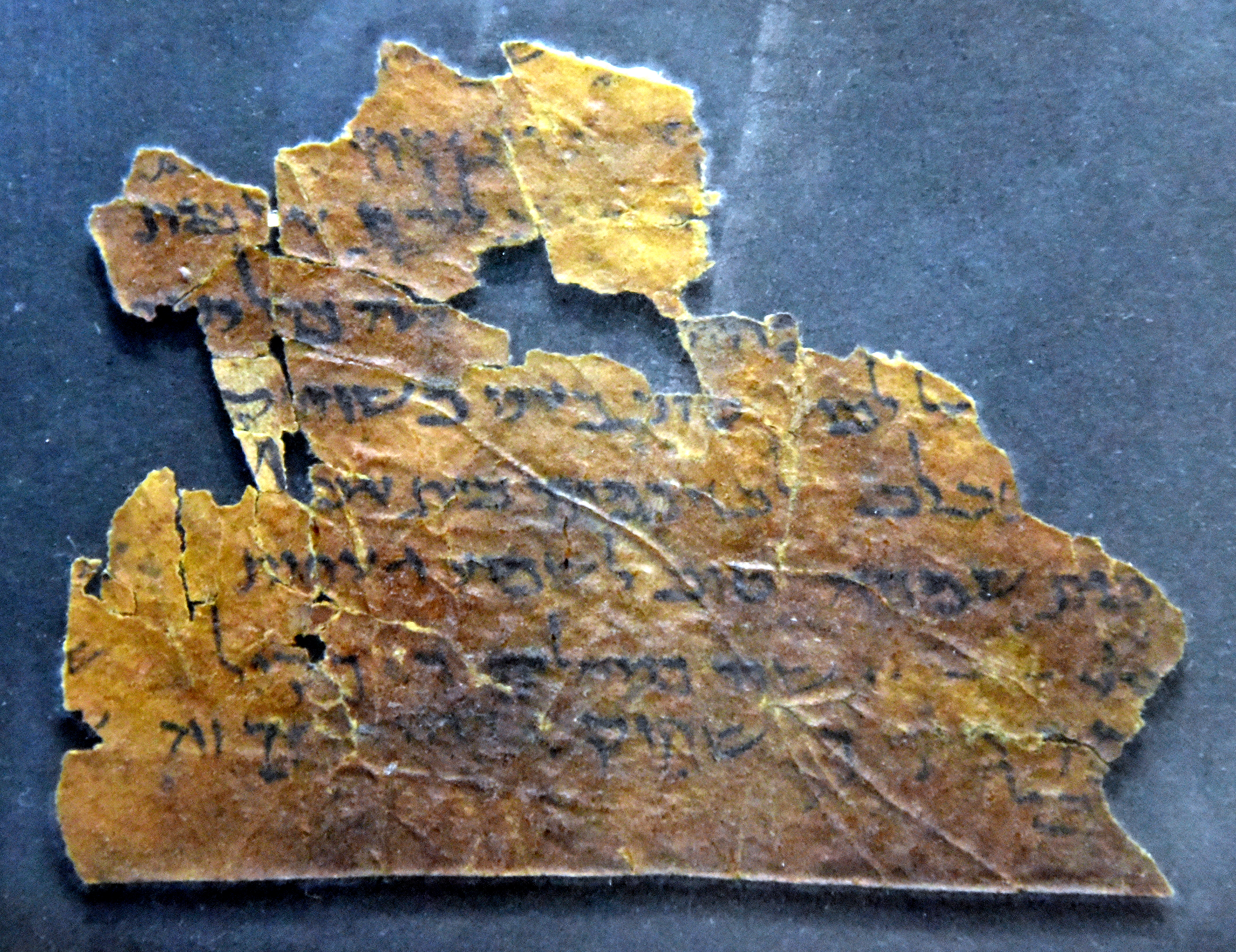
Dead Sea Scroll 109, Qohelet or Ecclesiastes, from Qumran Cave 4, the Jordan Museum in Amman

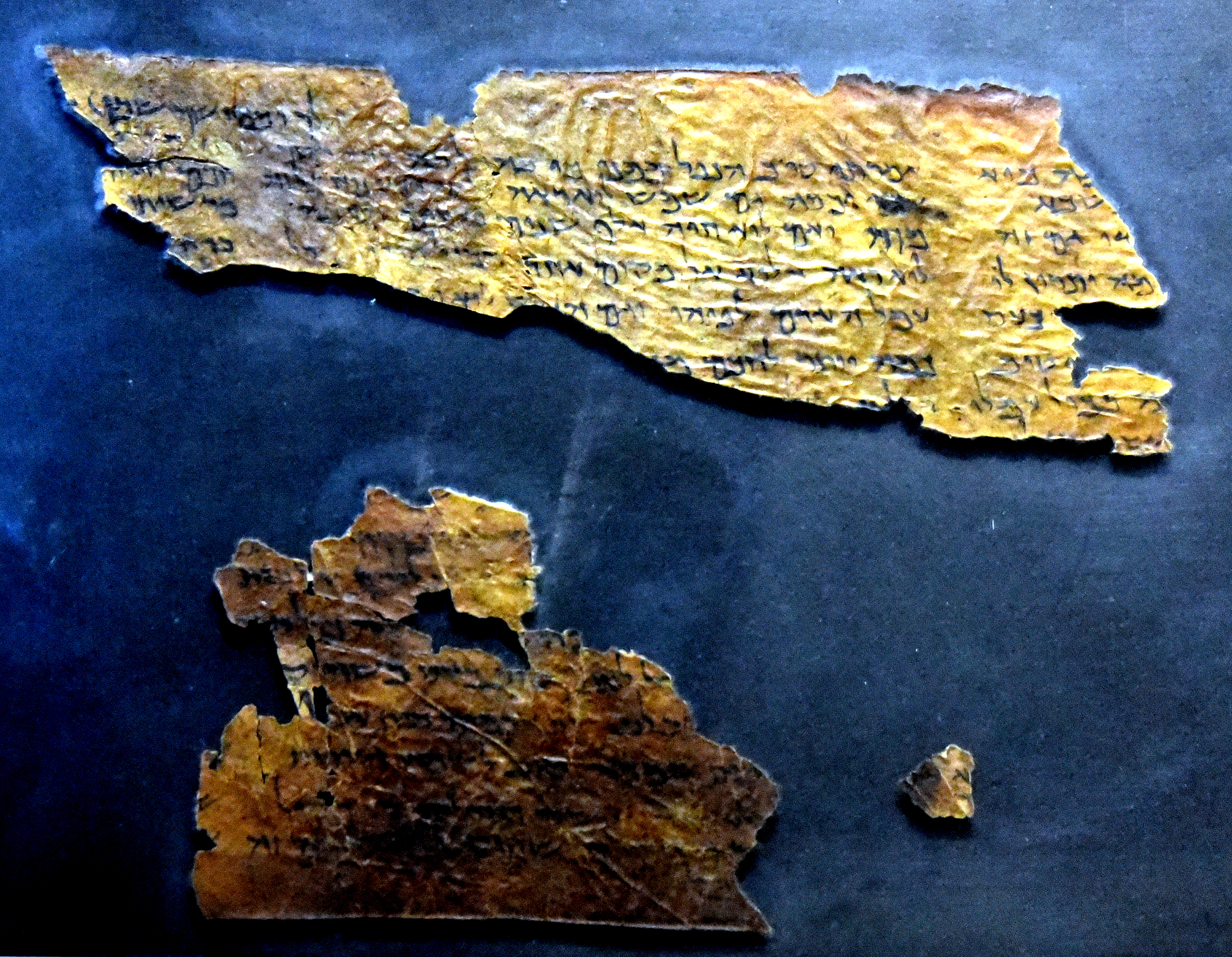
Dead Sea Scroll 109, Qohelet or Ecclesiastes, from Qumran Cave 4, at the Jordan Museum in Amman

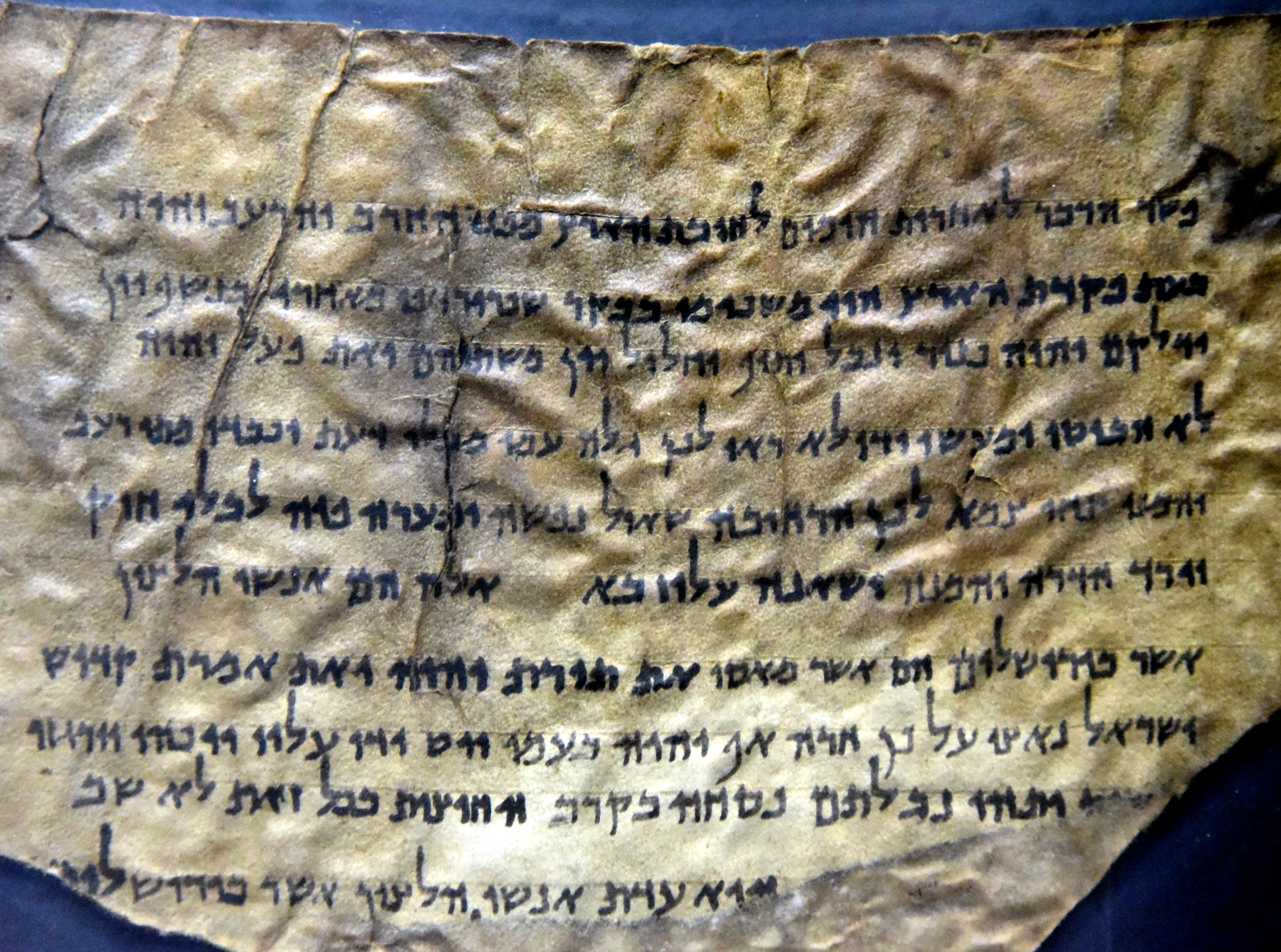
Dead Sea Scroll, Pesher Isaiah, from Qumran Cave 4, the Jordan Museum in Amman

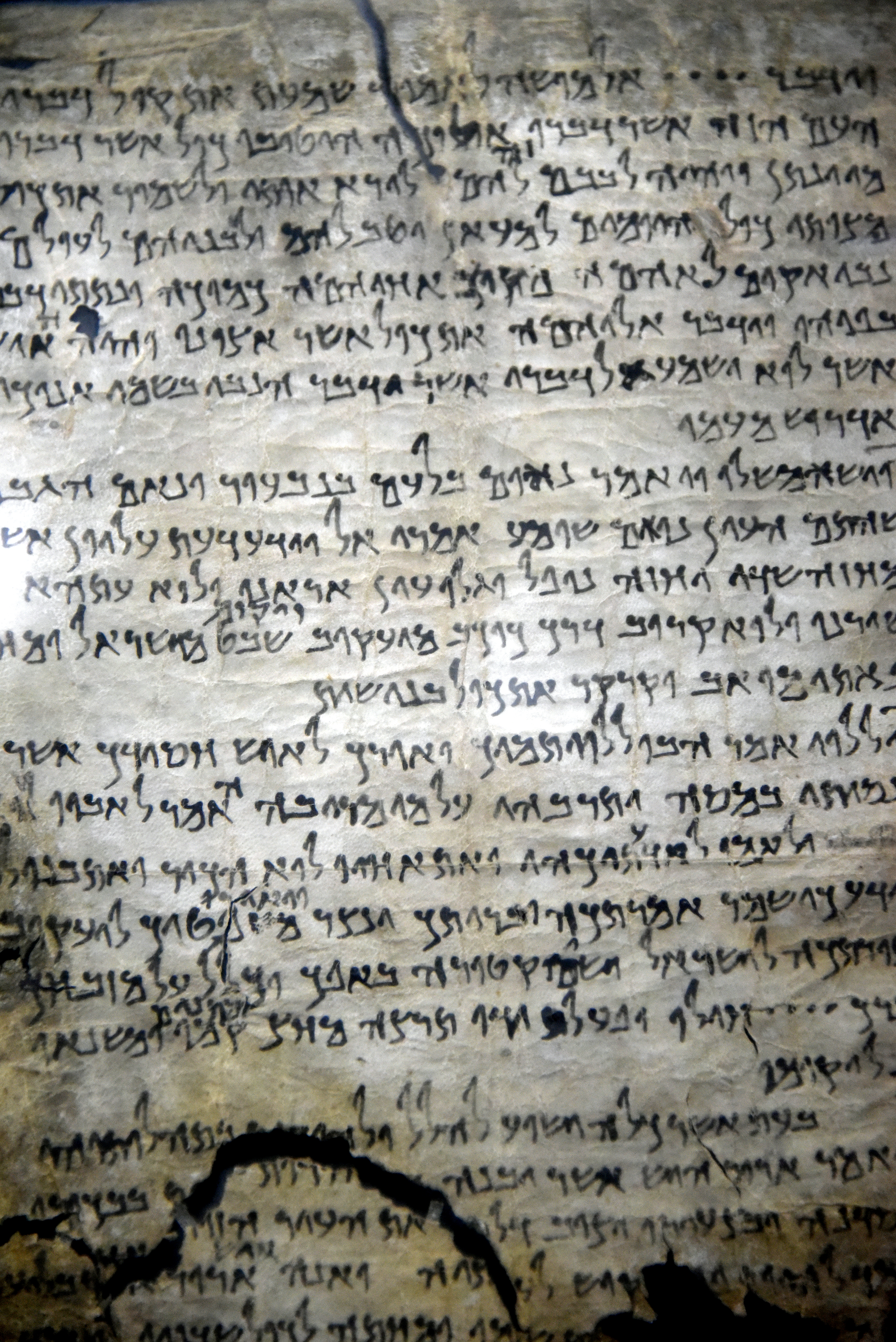
Dead Sea Scroll 175, Testimonia, from Qumran Cave 4, the Jordan Museum in Amman

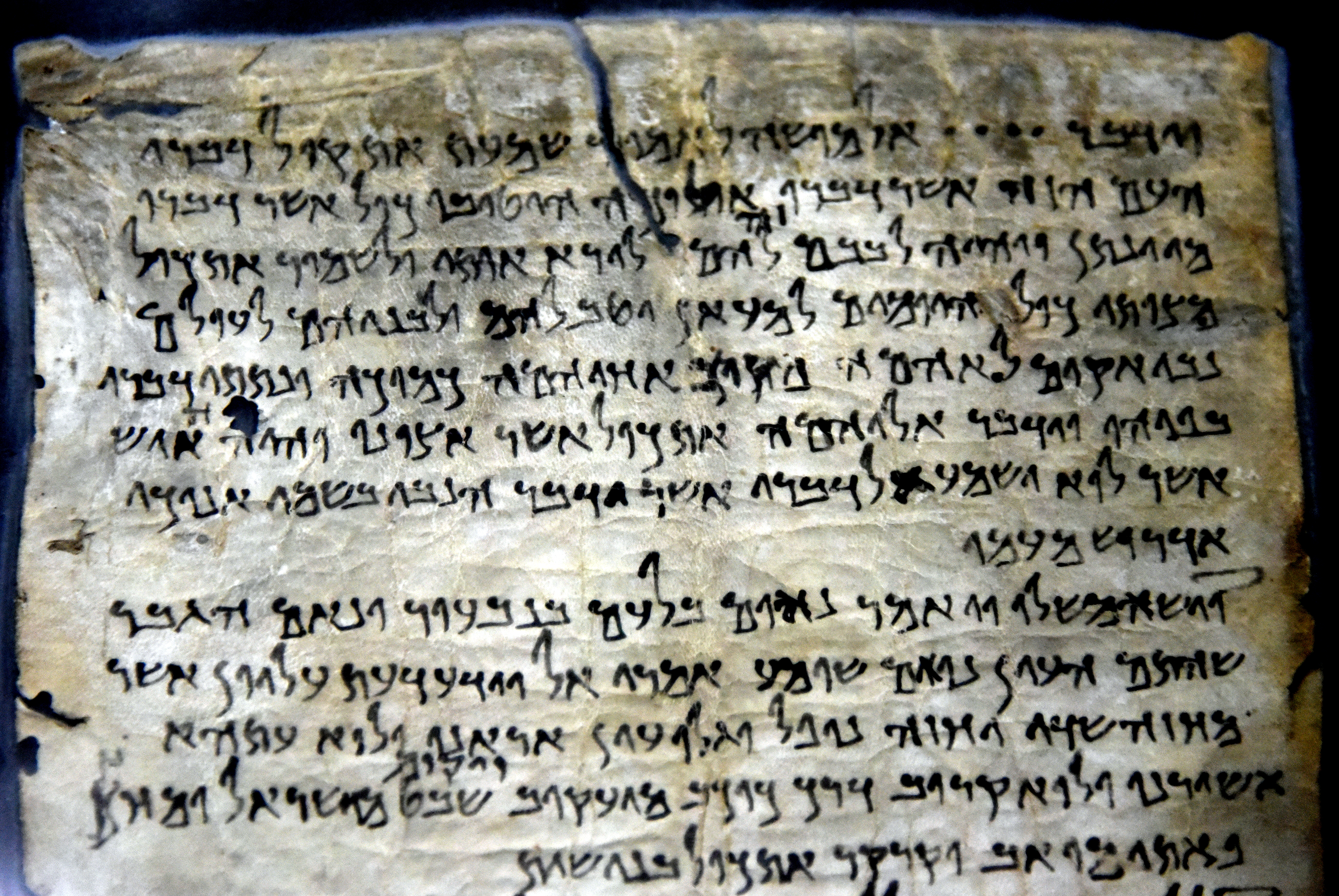
Detail, Dead Sea Scroll 175, Testimonia, from Qumran Cave 4, the Jordan Museum in Amman

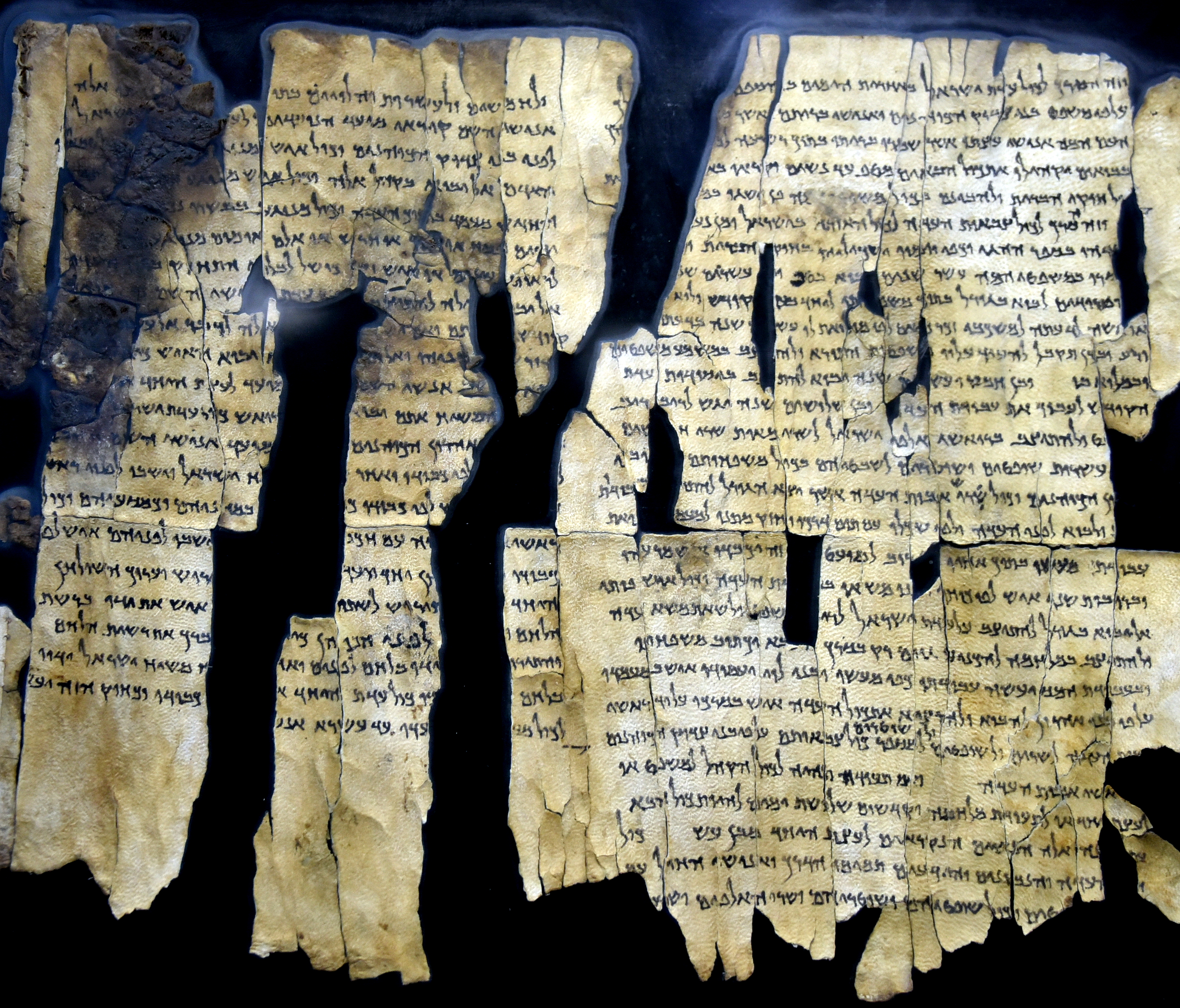
Dead Sea Scroll 28a from Qumran Cave 1, the Jordan Museum in Amman

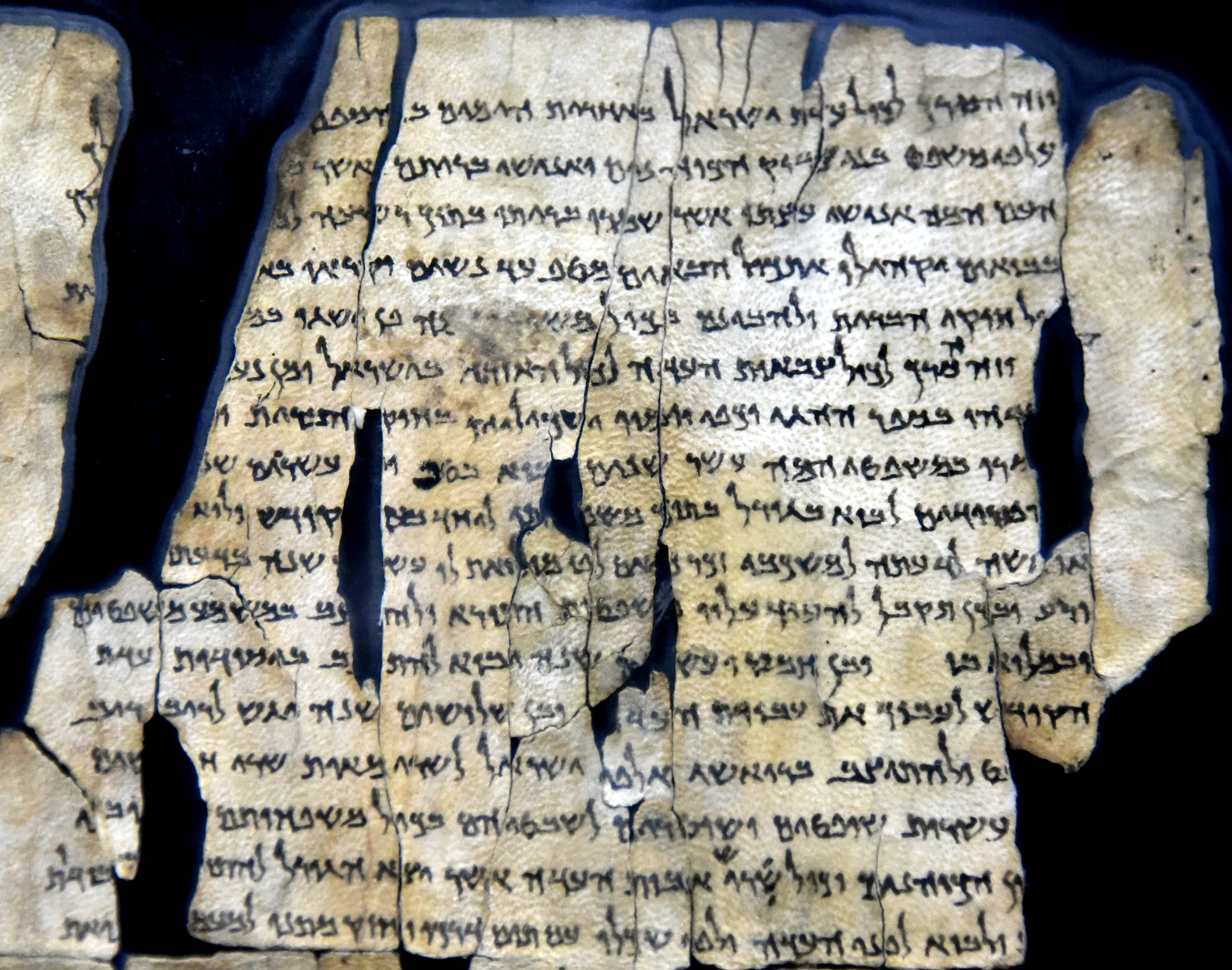
Part of Dead Sea Scroll 28a from Qumran Cave 1, the Jordan Museum in Amman

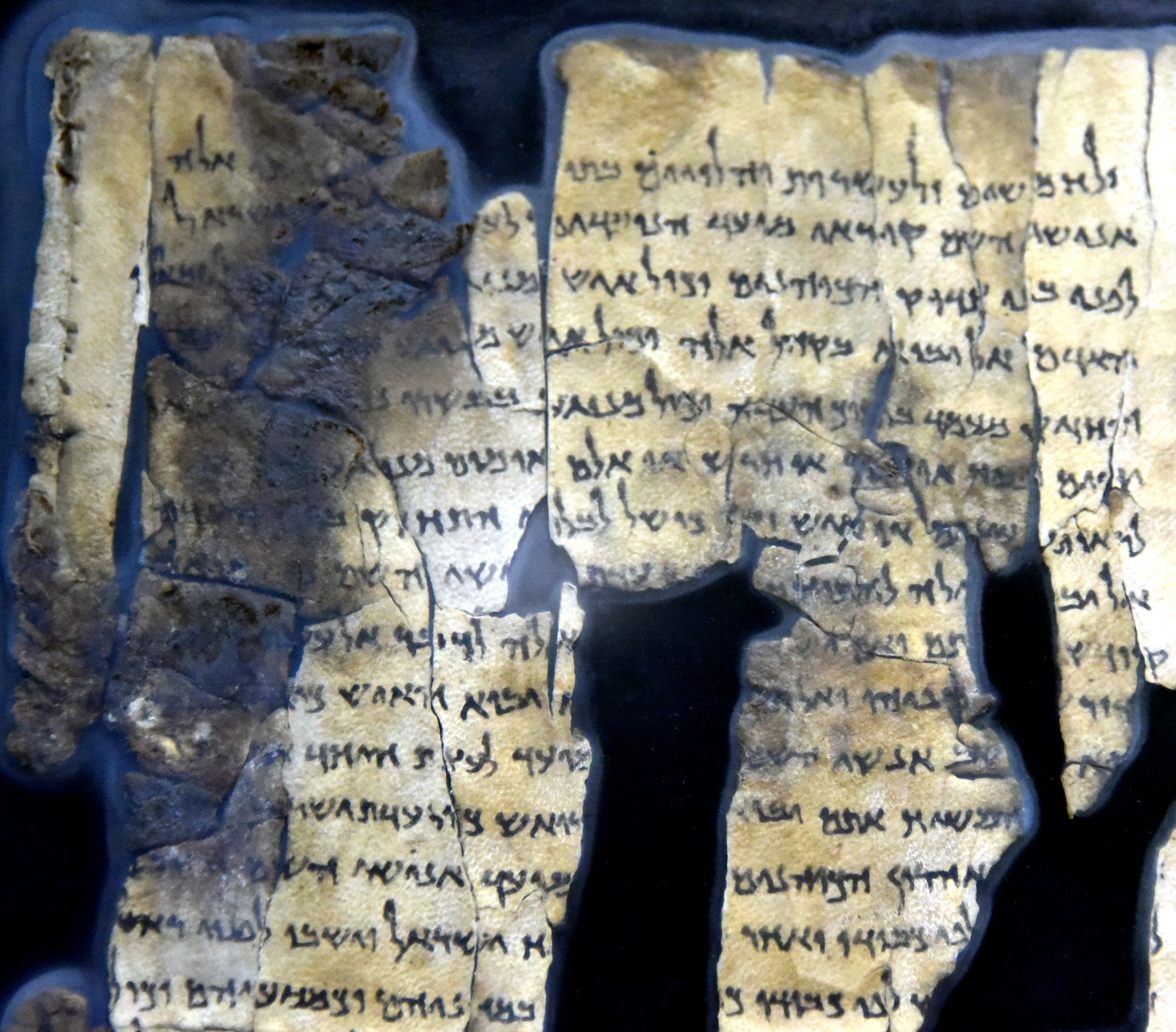
Part of Dead Sea Scroll 28a from Qumran Cave 1, at the Jordan Museum in Amman

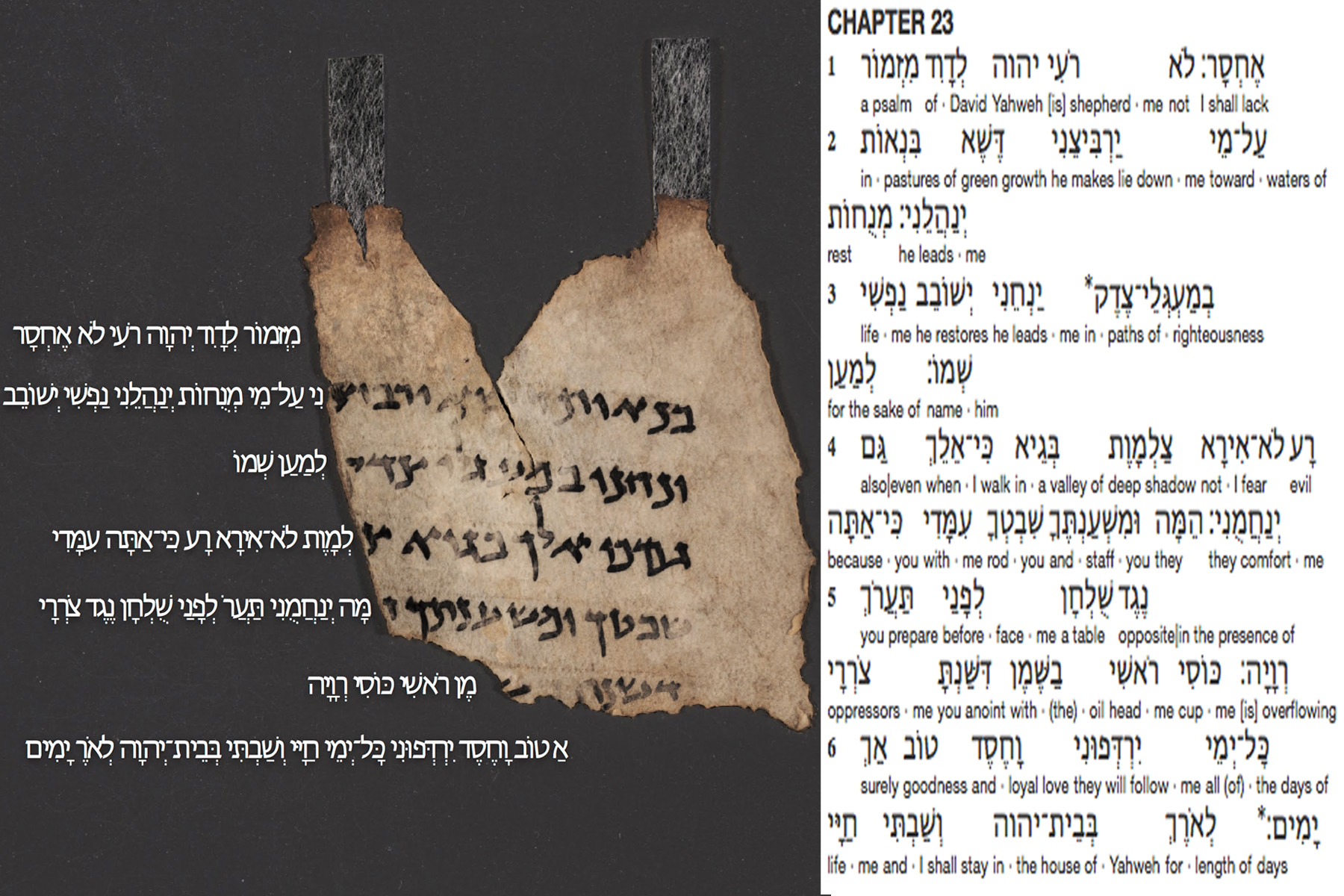
Dead Sea Scroll fragment 5/6HEV PS found in the Cave of Letters at Nahal Hever

== Origin ==
There has been much debate about the origin of the Dead Sea Scrolls. The dominant theory remains that the scrolls were produced by the Essenes, a sect of Jews living at nearby Qumran, but this theory has come to be challenged by several modern scholars.

=== Qumran–Essene theory ===
The view among scholars, almost universally held until the 1990s, is the "Qumran–Essene" hypothesis originally posited by Roland Guérin de Vaux and Józef Tadeusz Milik, though independently both Eliezer Sukenik and Butrus Sowmy of St Mark's Monastery connected scrolls with the Essenes well before any excavations at Qumran. The Qumran–Essene theory holds that the scrolls were written by the Essenes or by another Jewish sectarian group residing at Khirbet Qumran. They composed the scrolls and ultimately hid them in the nearby caves during the Jewish Revolt sometime between 66 and 68 CE. The site of Qumran was destroyed and the scrolls never recovered. Arguments supporting this theory include:

- There are striking similarities between the description of an initiation ceremony of new members in the Community Rule and descriptions of the Essene initiation ceremony mentioned in the works of Flavius Josephus, a Jewish-Roman historian of the Second Temple period.
- Josephus mentioned the Essenes as sharing property among the members of the community, as does the Community Rule.
- During the excavation of Khirbet Qumran, two inkwells and plastered elements thought to be tables were found, offering evidence that some form of writing was done there. More inkwells were discovered nearby. De Vaux called this area the "scriptorium" based upon this discovery.
- Several Jewish ritual baths (Hebrew: מקוה, miqvah) were discovered at Qumran, offering evidence of an observant Jewish presence at the site.
- Pliny the Elder (a geographer writing after the fall of Jerusalem in 70 CE) described a group of Essenes living in a desert community on the northwest shore of the Dead Sea near the ruined town of 'Ein Gedi.

=== Qumran–Sectarian theory ===
Qumran–Sectarian theories are variations on the Qumran–Essene theory. The main point of departure from the Qumran–Essene theory is hesitation to link the Dead Sea Scrolls specifically with the Essenes. Most proponents of the Qumran–Sectarian theory posit a group of Jews living in or near Qumran were responsible for the Dead Sea Scrolls but do not necessarily conclude that the sectarians were Essenes.

A specific variation on the Qumran–Sectarian theory emerged in the 1990s that has gained much recent popularity is the work of Lawrence H. Schiffman, who proposes that the community was led by a group of Zadokite priests (Sadducees). The most important document in support of this view is the "Miqsat Ma'ase Ha-Torah" (4QMMT), which cites purity laws (such as the transfer of impurities) identical to those attributed in rabbinic writings to the Sadducees. 4QMMT also reproduces a festival calendar that follows Sadducee principles for the dating of certain festival days.

=== Christian origin theory ===
Spanish Jesuit José O'Callaghan Martínez argued in the 1960s that one fragment (7Q5) preserves a portion of text from the New Testament Gospel of Mark 6:52–53.

Robert Eisenman has advanced the theory that some scrolls describe the early Christian community. Eisenman also argues that the careers of James the Just and Paul the Apostle correspond to events recorded in some of these documents.

=== Jerusalem origin theory ===
Some scholars have argued that the scrolls were the product of Jews living in Jerusalem who hid the scrolls in the caves near Qumran while fleeing from the Romans during the destruction of Jerusalem in 70 CE. Karl Heinrich Rengstorf first proposed in the 1960s that the Dead Sea Scrolls originated at the library of the Jewish Temple in Jerusalem. Later, Norman Golb suggested that the scrolls were the product of multiple libraries in Jerusalem and not necessarily the Jerusalem Temple library. Proponents of the Jerusalem origin theory point to the diversity of thought and handwriting among the scrolls as evidence against a Qumran origin of the scrolls. Several archaeologists have also accepted an origin of the scrolls other than Qumran, including Yizhar Hirschfeld and more recently Yizhak Magen and Yuval Peleg, who all understand the remains of Qumran to be those of a Hasmonean fort that was reused during later periods.

== Languages ==
The texts of the Dead Sea Scrolls are written in four languages: Hebrew, Aramaic, Greek, and Nabataean.

Language	Script	Percentage of documents	Centuries of known use
Hebrew	Assyrian block script	Estimated 76–79%	3rd century BCE to present
Hebrew	Cryptic scripts "A" "B" and "C"	Estimated 0.9–1.0%	Unknown
Biblical Hebrew	Paleo-Hebrew script	Estimated 1.0–1.5%	10th century BCE to the 2nd century CE
Biblical Hebrew	Paleo-Hebrew scribal script	Estimated 1.0–1.5%	10th century BCE to the 2nd century CE
Aramaic	Aramaic square script	Estimated 16–17%	8th century BCE to present
Greek	Greek uncial script	Estimated 3%	3rd century BCE to 8th century CE
Nabataean	Nabataean script	Estimated 0.2%	2nd century BCE to the 4th century CE

== Dating process and results ==
=== Radiocarbon dating ===
Parchment from a number of the Dead Sea Scrolls has been carbon dated. The initial test performed in 1950 was on a piece of linen from one of the caves. This test gave an indicative dating of 33 CE plus or minus 200 years, eliminating early hypotheses relating the scrolls to the Medieval period. Since then two large series of tests have been performed on the scrolls. The results were summarized by VanderKam and Flint, who said the tests give "strong reason for thinking that most of the Qumran manuscripts belong to the last two centuries BCE and the first century CE."

In 2025, a series of radiocarbon tests were carried out on samples from thirty scrolls. The samples were distributed as 25 from the Qumran Caves, 1 from Masada, 2 from the Murabbaat caves, and 2 from the Nahal Hever caves. The study also made use of an AI-based date-prediction model called "Enoch", which was trained by applying Bayesian ridge regression on the handwriting-style descriptors of 24 of the 14C-dated samples, for the paleographic dating of some 135 previously undated manuscripts. The study found earlier dates and coexistence of the Herodian and Hasmonean scripts, into the 2nd and 3rd century BCE, and possible pre-Hasmonean evidence of scribal literacy.

=== Paleographic dating ===
Analysis of letter forms, or palaeography, was applied to the texts of the Dead Sea Scrolls by a variety of scholars in the field. Major linguistic analysis by Cross and Avigad dates fragments from 225 BCE to 50 CE. These dates were determined by examining the size, variability, and style of the text. The same fragments were later analysed using radiocarbon dating and were dated to an estimated range of 385 BCE to 82 CE with a 68% accuracy rate.

=== Proposed older dates (2025) ===
A new study was published in 2025 that uses A.I. and latest radiocarbon dating, as well as the updated handwriting analysis. This study proposes older dates for some of the scrolls. Researchers have developed a new artificial intelligence model called "Enoch". Then some 135 Dead Sea Scroll manuscripts that have not been previously dated were analyzed. The lead author is Mladen Popović from the University of Groningen in the Netherlands.

For example, the fragmentary scroll 4Q114 of the Book of Daniel is now dated to between 230 and 160 BCE, as much as 60 years earlier than previously thought.

One outcome of this study provides new insights on the dating of the Herodian-type manuscripts that are generally believed to be younger than the Hasmonaean-type manuscripts. Analysis shows that the date range of the Herodian manuscripts is much wider than previously thought; it is proposed that it extends "from the second century CE all the way back to the second century BCE". So these ranges for the two types are now shown to be overlapping with each other to some extent.

== Materials ==
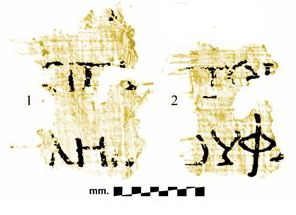
Fragments 1 and 2 of '7Q6' from Cave 7 are written on papyrus.

=== Ink and parchment ===
The scrolls were analysed using a cyclotron at the University of California, Davis, where it was found that all black ink was carbon black. The red ink on the scrolls was found to be made with cinnabar (HgS, mercury sulfide). There are only four uses of this red ink in the entire collection of Dead Sea Scroll fragments. The black inks found on the scrolls are mostly made of carbon soot from olive oil lamps. Honey, oil, vinegar, and water were often added to the mixture to thin the ink to a proper consistency for writing. Galls were sometimes added to the ink to make it more resilient. In order to apply the ink to the scrolls, its writers used reed pens.

The Dead Sea Scrolls were written on parchment made of processed animal hide known as vellum (approximately 85.5–90.5% of the scrolls), papyrus (estimated at 8–13% of the scrolls), and sheets of bronze composed of about 99% copper and 1% tin (approximately 1.5% of the scrolls). For those scrolls written on animal hides, scholars with the Israeli Antiquities Authority (IAA), by use of DNA testing for assembly purposes, believe that there may be a hierarchy in the religious importance of the texts based on which type of animal was used to create the hide. Scrolls written on goat and calf hides are considered by scholars to be more significant in nature, while those written on gazelle or ibex are considered to be less religiously significant in nature.

Tests by the National Institute of Nuclear Physics in Sicily have suggested that the origin of parchment of select Dead Sea Scroll fragments is from the Qumran area, by using X-ray and particle-induced X-ray emission testing of the water used to make the parchment that were compared with the water from the area around Qumran.

== Preservation ==
=== In the caves ===
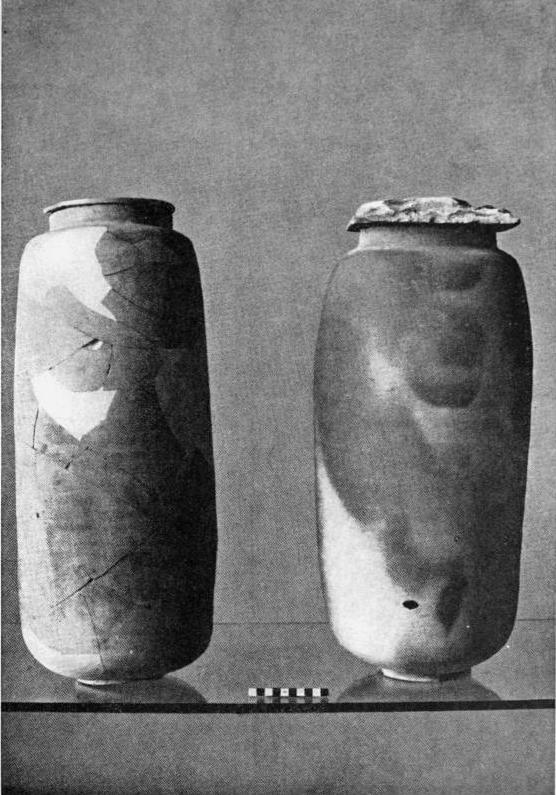
Two of the pottery jars that held some of the Dead Sea Scrolls found at Qumran

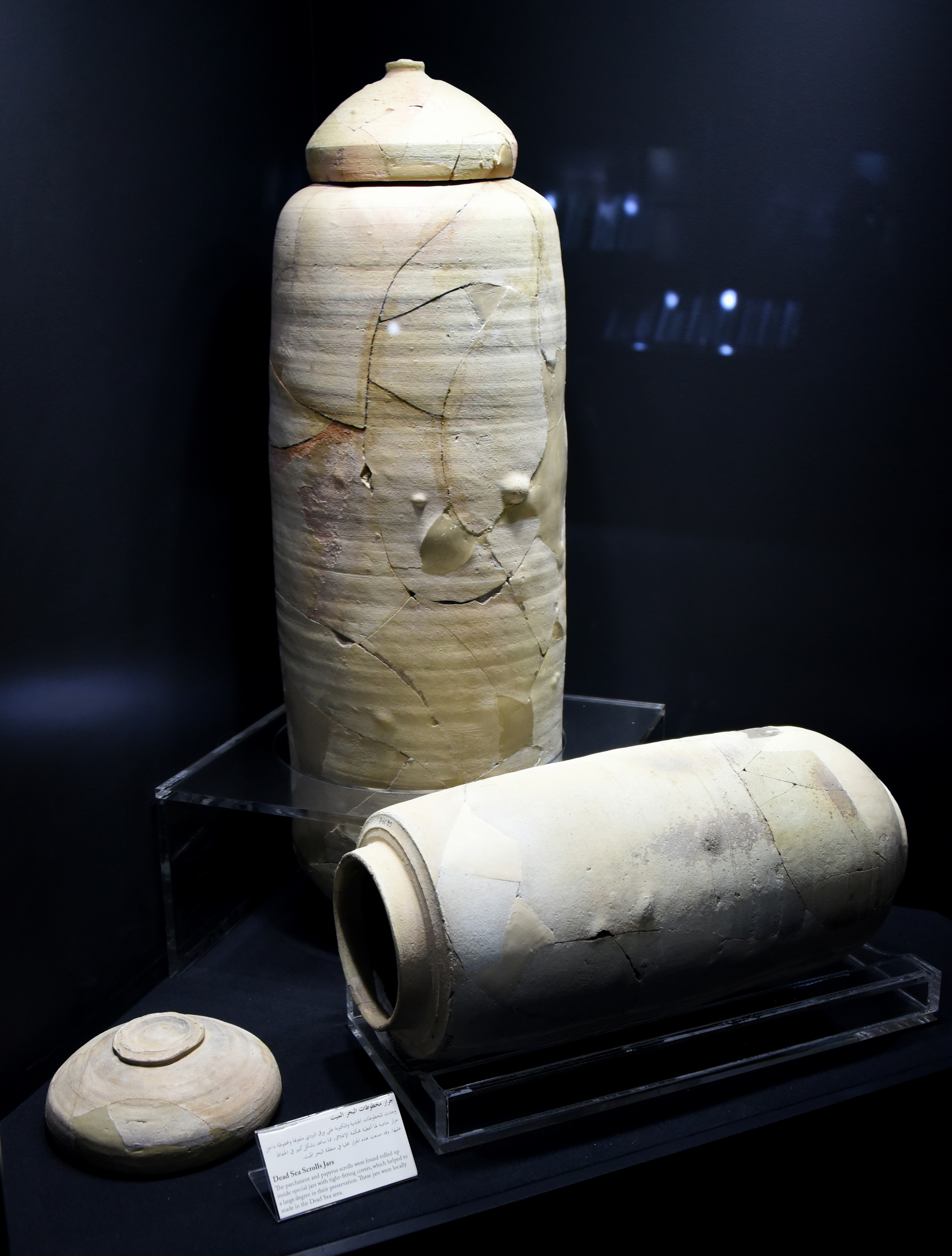
Two Dead Sea Scrolls jars at the Jordan Museum, Amman

The Dead Sea Scrolls that were found were originally preserved by the arid conditions present within the Qumran area adjoining the Dead Sea. In addition, the lack of the use of tanning materials on the parchment of the Dead Sea Scrolls and the very low airflow in the caves also contributed significantly to their preservation. Some of the scrolls were found stored in clay jars, further helping to preserve them from deterioration.

=== After discovery ===
The original handling of the scrolls by archaeologists and scholars was done inappropriately, and, along with their storage in an uncontrolled environment, they began a process of more rapid deterioration than they had experienced at Qumran. During the first few years in the late 1940s and early 1950s, adhesive tape used to join fragments and seal cracks caused significant damage to the documents. The government of Jordan had recognized the urgency of protecting the scrolls from deterioration and the presence of the deterioration among the scrolls. However, the government did not have adequate funds to purchase all the scrolls for their protection and agreed to have foreign institutions purchase the scrolls and have them held at their museum in Jerusalem until they could be "adequately studied".

In early 1953, the scrolls were moved to the Palestine Archaeological Museum (commonly called the Rockefeller Museum) in Jordanian-held East Jerusalem and through their transportation suffered more deterioration and damage. The museum was underfunded and had limited resources with which to examine the scrolls, and as a result conditions of the "scrollery" and storage area were left relatively uncontrolled by modern standards. The museum had left most of the fragments and scrolls lying between window glass, trapping the moisture in with them, causing an acceleration in the deterioration process.

During the Suez Crisis the scrolls collection of the Palestine Archaeological Museum was stored in the vault of the Ottoman Bank in Amman, Jordan. Damp conditions from temporary storage of the scrolls in the Ottoman Bank vault from 1956 to 1957 led to a more rapid rate of deterioration of the scrolls. The conditions caused mildew to develop on the scrolls and fragments, and some fragments were partially destroyed or made illegible by the glue and paper of the manila envelopes in which they were stored while in the vault.

By 1958 it was noted that up to 5% of some of the scrolls had completely deteriorated. Many of the texts had become illegible, and many of the parchments had darkened considerably. Until the 1970s, the scrolls continued to deteriorate because of poor storage arrangements, exposure to different adhesives, and being stored in moist environments. Fragments written on parchment (rather than papyrus or bronze) in the hands of private collectors and scholars suffered an even worse fate than those in the hands of the museum, with large portions of fragments being reported to have disappeared by 1966. In the late 1960s, the deterioration was becoming a major concern with scholars and museum officials alike. Scholars John Allegro and Sir Francis Frank were among the first to strongly advocate for better preservation techniques.

Early attempts made by both the British and Israel Museums to remove the adhesive tape ended up exposing the parchment to an array of chemicals, including "British Leather Dressing", and darkening some of them significantly. In the 1970s and 1980s, other preservation attempts were made that included removing the glass plates and replacing them with cardboard and removing pressure against the plates that held the scrolls in storage; however, the fragments and scrolls continued to rapidly deteriorate during this time.

In 1991, the IAA established a temperature-controlled laboratory for the storage and preservation of the scrolls. The actions and preservation methods of IAA staff, first based at the Rockefeller Museum, were concentrated on the removal of tape, oils, and other contaminants. The fragments and scrolls are preserved using acid-free cardboard and stored in solander boxes in the climate-controlled storage area.

== Scholarly examination ==
After most of the scrolls and fragments were moved to the Palestine Archaeological Museum in 1953, scholars began to assemble them and log them for translation and study in a room that became known as the "scrollery".

=== Photography and assembly ===
Since the Dead Sea Scrolls were initially held by different parties during and after the excavation process, they were not all photographed by the same organization.

==== First photographs (1948) ====
The first individual to photograph a portion of the collection was Trever, who was a resident for the American Schools of Oriental Research. He photographed three of the scrolls discovered in Cave 1 on 21 February 1948, both on black-and-white and color film. Although an amateur photographer, the quality of his photographs often exceeded the visibility of the scrolls themselves as, over the years, the ink of the texts quickly deteriorated after they were removed from their linen wrappings.

==== Infrared photography and plate assembly (1952–1967) ====
A majority of the collection from the Qumran caves was acquired by the Palestine Archaeological Museum. The museum had the scrolls photographed by Najib Albina, a local Arab photographer trained by Lewis Larsson of the American Colony in Jerusalem, Between 1952 and 1967, Albina documented the five-stage process of the sorting and assembly of the scrolls, done by the curator and staff of the Palestine Archaeological Museum, using infrared photography. Using a process known today as broadband fluorescence infrared photography, or NIR photography, Najib and the team at the museum produced over 1,750 photographic plates of the scrolls and fragments. The photographs were taken with the scrolls laid out on animal skin using large format film, which caused the text to stand out, making the plates especially useful for assembling fragments. These are the earliest photographs of the museum's collection, which was the most complete in the world at the time, and they recorded the fragments and scrolls before their further decay in storage, so they are often considered the best recorded copies of the scrolls.

==== Digital infrared imaging (1993–2012) ====
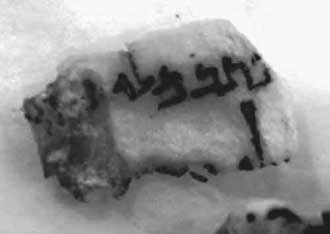
A previously unreadable fragment of the Dead Sea Scrolls photographed by the Jet Propulsion Laboratory using digital infrared technology. Translated into English it reads: "He wrote the words of Noah."

Beginning in 1993, the United States National Aeronautics and Space Administration (NASA) used digital infrared imaging technology to produce photographs of Dead Sea Scrolls fragments. In partnership with the Ancient Biblical Manuscript Center and West Semitic Research, NASA's Jet Propulsion Laboratory successfully worked to expand on the use of infrared photography previously used to evaluate ancient manuscripts by expanding the range of spectra at which images are photographed.

NASA used multispectral imaging adapted from its remote sensing and planetary probes in order to reveal previously illegible text on the fragments. The process uses a liquid crystal tunable filter in order to photograph the scrolls at specific wavelengths of light and, as a result, image distortion is significantly diminished. This method was used with select fragments to reveal text and details a larger light spectrum could not reveal. The camera and digital imaging assembly were developed specifically for the purpose of photographing illegible ancient texts.

On 18 December 2012 the first output of this project was launched together with Google on the dedicated site Deadseascrolls.org.il. The site contains both digitizations of old images taken in the 1950s and about 1,000 images taken with multispectral imaging.

==== DNA scroll assembly (2006–2020) ====
Scientists with the IAA have used DNA from the parchment on which the fragments were written, in concert with infrared digital photography, to assist in the reassembly of the scrolls. For scrolls written on parchment made from animal hide and papyrus, scientists with the museum are using DNA code to associate fragments with different scrolls and to help scholars determine which scrolls may hold greater significance based on the type of material that was used. In a paper published in 2020 in the journal Cell, researchers from Tel Aviv University have shown that DNA extracted from the scrolls can be used to sort different scroll fragments not only based on the animal species but also based on variations in the nuclear genome of individual fragments. This effort enabled the researchers to match different fragments to each other based on their genetics and separate fragments which were falsely connected in the past.

==== Tracing Scribes and Scrolls ====
A five-year research project announced in June 2026 and led by Mladen Popović of the University of Groningen will work in conjunction with the Israel Antiquities Authority to look deeper into the history, transmission and cultural environment of the scrolls. The project, funded by a grant of €2.5 million from in the European Research Council and called Tracing Scribes and Scrolls, will use traditional research tools and artificial intelligence to look at the physical and paleographical characteristics of 250 items collected from the Dead Sea Scrolls to examine the characteristics of the parchment and papyrus used as a writing surface, the inks used and the properties of the scribes who wrote them, to make better approximations of the history of the scrolls.

== Publication ==
=== Physical publication ===
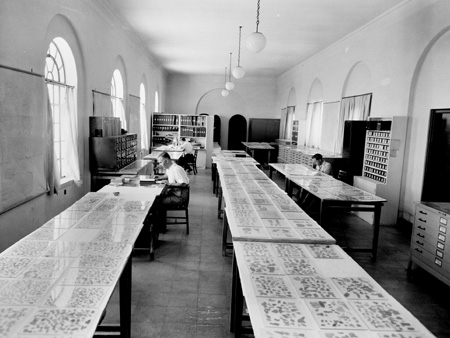
Scholars assembling Dead Sea Scrolls fragments at the Rockefeller Museum (formerly the Palestine Archaeological Museum)

Some of the fragments and scrolls were published early. Most of the longer, more complete scrolls were published soon after their discovery. All the writings in Cave 1 appeared in print between 1950 and 1956; those from eight other caves were released in 1963; and in 1965 the Psalms Scroll from Cave 11 was published. Their translations into English soon followed.

Publication of the scrolls has taken many decades, and delays have been a source of academic controversy. The scrolls were controlled by a small group of scholars headed by John Strugnell, while a majority of scholars had access neither to the scrolls nor even to photographs of the text. Scholars such as Norman Golb, publishers and writers such as Hershel Shanks, and many others argued for decades for publishing the texts, so that they may become available to researchers. This controversy only ended in 1991, when the Biblical Archaeology Society was able to publish the "Facsimile Edition of the Dead Sea Scrolls", after an intervention of the Israeli government and the IAA. In 1991, Emanuel Tov was appointed as the chairman of the Dead Sea Scrolls Foundation, and publication of the scrolls followed in the same year.

The majority of the scrolls consist of tiny, brittle fragments, which were published at a pace considered by many to be excessively slow. During early assembly and translation work by scholars through the Rockefeller Museum from the 1950s through the 1960s, access to the unpublished documents was limited to the editorial committee.

==== Discoveries in the Judaean Desert (1955–2009) ====
The content of the scrolls was published in a 40-volume series by Oxford University Press between 1955 and 2009 known as Discoveries in the Judaean Desert. In 1952 the Jordanian Department of Antiquities assembled a team of scholars to begin examining, assembling, and translating the scrolls with the intent of publishing them. The initial publication, assembled by Dominique Barthélemy and Józef Milik, was published as Qumran Cave 1 in 1955. After a series of other publications in the late 1980s and early 1990s and with the appointment of the respected Dutch-Israeli textual scholar Emanuel Tov as editor-in-chief of the Dead Sea Scrolls Publication Project in 1990 publication of the scrolls accelerated. Tov's team had published five volumes covering the Cave 4 documents by 1995. Between 1990 and 2009, Tov helped the team produce 32 volumes. The final volume, Volume XL, was published in 2009.

==== A Preliminary Edition of the Unpublished Dead Sea Scrolls (1991) ====
In 1991, researchers at Hebrew Union College in Cincinnati, Ohio, Ben Zion Wacholder and Martin Abegg, announced the creation of a computer program that used previously published scrolls to reconstruct the unpublished texts. Officials at the Huntington Library in San Marino, California, led by head librarian William Andrew Moffett, announced that they would allow researchers unrestricted access to the library's complete set of photographs of the scrolls. In the fall of that year, Wacholder published 17 documents that had been reconstructed in 1988 from a concordance and had come into the hands of scholars outside of the international team; in the same month, there occurred the discovery and publication of a complete set of facsimiles of the Cave 4 materials at the Huntington Library. Thereafter, the officials of the IAA agreed to lift their long-standing restrictions on the use of the scrolls.

==== A Facsimile Edition of the Dead Sea Scrolls (1991) ====
After further delays, attorney William John Cox undertook representation of an "undisclosed client", who had provided a complete set of the unpublished photographs, and contracted for their publication. Professors Robert Eisenman and James Robinson indexed the photographs and wrote an introduction to A Facsimile Edition of the Dead Sea Scrolls, which was published by the Biblical Archaeology Society in 1991. Following the publication of the Facsimile Edition, Professor Elisha Qimron sued Hershel Shanks, Eisenman, Robinson and the Biblical Archaeology Society for copyright infringement for publishing without authorization or attribution his decipherment of one of the scrolls, MMT. The District Court of Jerusalem found in favour of Qimron. The court issued a restraining order which prohibited the publication of the deciphered text, and ordered defendants to pay Qimron NIS 100,000 for infringing his copyright and the right of attribution. Defendants appealed to the Supreme Court of Israel which approved the district court's decision. The Supreme Court further ordered that the defendants hand over to Qimron all the infringing copies. The decision met Israeli and international criticism from copyright law scholars.

==== The Facsimile Edition (2007–2008) ====
In November 2007 the Dead Sea Scrolls Foundation commissioned the London publisher Facsimile Editions Limited to produce a facsimile edition of The Great Isaiah Scroll (1QIsa^{a}), The Order of the Community (1QS), and The Pesher to Habakkuk (1QpHab). The facsimile was produced from 1948 photographs and so more faithfully represents the condition of the Isaiah Scroll at the time of its discovery than does the current condition of the Isaiah Scroll.

Of the first three facsimile sets, one was exhibited at the Early Christianity and the Dead Sea Scrolls exhibition in Seoul, South Korea, and a second set was purchased by the British Library in London. A further 46 sets including facsimiles of three fragments from Cave 4 (now in the collection of the National Archaeological Museum in Amman, Jordan) Testimonia (4Q175), Pesher Isaiah^{b} (4Q162) and Qohelet (4Q109) were announced in May 2009. The edition is strictly limited to 49 numbered sets of these reproductions on either specially prepared parchment paper or real parchment. The facsimiles have since been exhibited in Qumrân. Le secret des manuscrits de la mer Morte at the Bibliothèque Nationale, Paris, France (2010) and Verbum Domini at the Vatican, Rome, Italy (2012).

=== Digital publication ===
The text of nearly all of the non-biblical scrolls has been recorded and tagged for morphology by Martin Abegg, Jr., the Ben Zion Wacholder Professor of Dead Sea Scroll Studies at Trinity Western University located in Langley, British Columbia, Canada. It is available on handheld devices through Olive Tree Bible Software and Logos Bible Software.

The text of almost all of the non-biblical texts was released on CD-ROM by publisher E.J. Brill in 2005. The 2,400 page, six-volume series, was assembled by an editorial team led by Donald W. Parry and Emanuel Tov. Unlike the text translations in the physical publication, Discoveries in the Judaean Desert, the texts are sorted by genres that include religious law, parabiblical texts, calendrical and sapiental texts, and poetic and liturgical works.

On 25 September 2011 the Israel Museum Digital Dead Sea Scrolls site went online. It gives users access to searchable, high-resolution images of the scrolls, as well as short explanatory videos and background information on the texts and their history. Since 2011, five complete scrolls from the Israel Museum have been digitized for the project and are accessible online: the Great Isaiah Scroll, the Community Rule Scroll, the Commentary on Habakkuk Scroll, the Temple Scroll, and the War Scroll, and are accessible through the museum, or through Google Arts & Culture.

== Digitization project (2011–2016) ==
In partnership with Google, the Israel Museum photographed a number of the Dead Sea Scrolls and made them available to the public digitally, albeit not in the public domain. The lead photographer of the project, Ardon Bar-Hama, and his team used the Alpa 12 MAX camera accompanied with a Leaf Aptus-II back to produce ultra-high resolution digital images of the scrolls and fragments. With photos taken at 1,200 megapixels, the results are digital images that can be used to distinguish details that are invisible to the naked eye. In order to minimize damage to the scrolls and fragments, photographers are using a 1/4000th of a second exposure time and UV-protected flash tubes. The digital photography project was estimated in 2011 to cost 3.5 million U.S. dollars.

== Biblical significance ==
Before the discovery of the Dead Sea Scrolls, the oldest Hebrew-language manuscripts of the Bible were Masoretic texts dating to the 10th century CE, such as the Aleppo Codex. Today, the oldest known extant manuscripts of the Masoretic Text date from approximately the 9th century. The Hebrew biblical manuscripts found among the Dead Sea Scrolls push that date back more than a millennium, to the 2nd century BCE. This was a significant discovery for Hebrew Bible scholars who anticipated that the Dead Sea Scrolls would either affirm or repudiate the reliability of textual transmission from the original texts to the oldest Masoretic texts at hand. The discovery demonstrated the unusual accuracy of transmission over a thousand-year period, rendering it reasonable to believe that current Hebrew Bible texts are reliable copies of the original works.

According to The Dead Sea Scrolls by Hebrew scholar Millar Burrows

It is a matter for wonder that through something like a thousand years the text underwent so little alteration. As I said in my first article on the scroll, "Herein lies its chief importance, supporting the fidelity of the Masoretic tradition." This statement was sharply criticized by Paul Kahle. For him the most significant fact about the scroll is that it has a large number of real variant readings, which are elsewhere practically nonexistent in Hebrew manuscripts of the Old Testament. The scroll therefore shows us for the first time what Hebrew manuscripts of the Bible were like before they had been made to conform to a standardized text. I still feel that the amount of agreement with the Masoretic text is the manuscript's most significant feature, but, having said that, I agree that the variants constitute its second point of importance.

Differences were found among fragments of texts. According to The Oxford Companion to Archaeology:

While some of the Qumran biblical manuscripts are nearly identical to the Masoretic, or traditional, Hebrew text of the Old Testament, some manuscripts of the books of Exodus and Samuel found in Cave Four exhibit dramatic differences in both language and content. In their astonishing range of textual variants, the Qumran biblical discoveries have prompted scholars to reconsider the once-accepted theories of the development of the modern biblical text from only three manuscript families: of the Masoretic text, of the Hebrew original of the Septuagint, and of the Samaritan Pentateuch. It is now becoming increasingly clear that the Old Testament scripture was extremely fluid until its canonization around AD 100.

The majority of the texts found is non-biblical in nature and were thought to be insignificant for understanding the composition or canonization of the biblical books, but a consensus has emerged which sees many of these works as being collected by the Essene community instead of being composed by them. Scholars now recognize that some of these works were composed earlier than the Essene period, when some of the biblical books were still being written or redacted into their final form.

=== Biblical books found ===
There are 235 biblical texts, including 10 deuterocanonical books, included in the Dead Sea Scroll documents, or around 22% of the total. The Dead Sea Scrolls contain parts of all but one of the books of the Hebrew Bible (Tanakh), also mirrored in Christian Bible (Old Testament) protocanon. The Scrolls also include four of the Jewish deuterocanonical books included in Catholic and Eastern Orthodox Bibles: Tobit, Sirach, Baruch 6 (also known as the Letter or Epistle of Jeremiah), and Psalm 151. The Book of Esther has not yet been found, and scholars believe Esther is missing because, as a Jew, her marriage to a Persian king may have been looked down upon by the inhabitants of Qumran, or because the book has the Purim festival which is not included in the Qumran calendar.

Listed below are the most represented books, along with the Jewish deuterocanonicals, of the Hebrew Bible found among the Dead Sea Scrolls, including the number of translatable Dead Sea texts that represent a copy of scripture from each biblical book:

Book	Number found
Psalms	39
Deuteronomy	33
1 Enoch	25
Genesis	24
Isaiah	22
Jubilees	21
Exodus	18
Leviticus	17
Numbers	11
Minor Prophets	10 (Note: 10 Scrolls containing fragments of all 12 of the "Minor Prophets" were found in Cave 4, although no fragment contains portions of more than three prophets.)
Daniel	8
Jeremiah	6
Ezekiel	6
Job	6
Tobit	5 (Note: There are four Aramaic fragmentary texts of Tobit, and one Hebrew text.)
Kings	4
Samuel	4
Judges	4
Song of Songs (Canticles)	4
Ruth	4
Lamentations	4
Sirach	3
Ecclesiastes	2
Joshua	2

== Museum exhibitions and displays ==
Small portions of the Dead Sea Scrolls collections have been put on temporary display in exhibitions at museums and public venues around the world. The majority of these exhibitions took place in 1965 in the United States and the United Kingdom, and from 1993 to 2011 in locations around the world. Many of the exhibitions were co-sponsored by either the Jordanian government (pre-1967) or the Israeli government (post-1967). Exhibitions were discontinued after 1965 due to the Six-Day War conflicts, and have subsequently slowed down after 2011, as the IAA works to digitize the scrolls and place them in permanent cold storage.

=== Israel ===
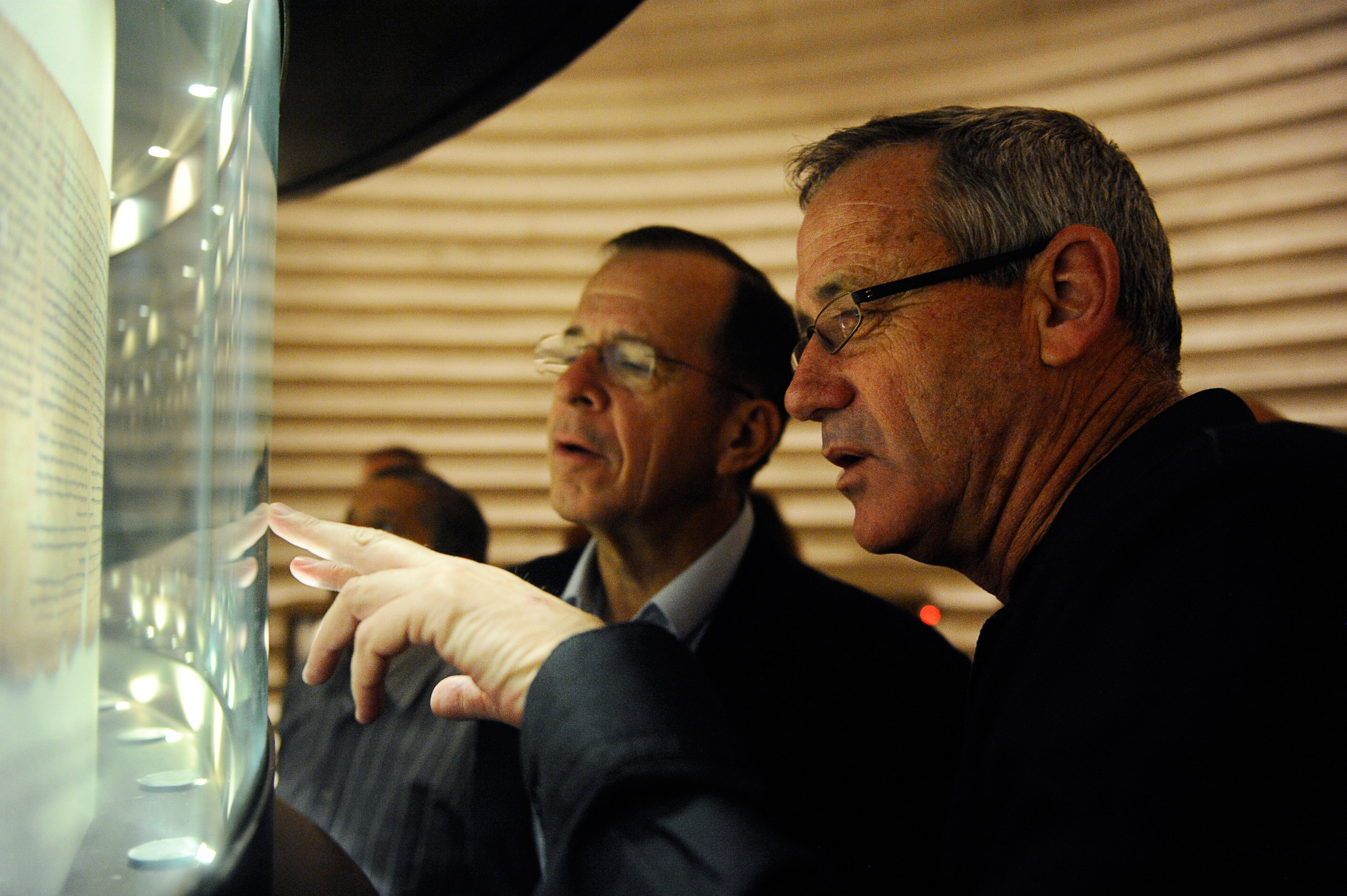
Visitors examining Dead Sea Scrolls displayed at the Shrine of the Book in Jerusalem

The majority of the Dead Sea Scrolls collection, which had been kept at the Rockefeller Museum, was moved to Jerusalem's Shrine of the Book (a part of the Israel Museum) after the building's completion in April 1965. The museum falls under the auspices of the IAA. The permanent exhibition at the museum features a reproduction of the Great Isaiah Scroll, surrounded by other fragments, either reproductions or originals, the latter being rotated every few months to avoid deterioration from light exposure. These include the Community Rule, War Scroll, and Thanksgiving Psalms Scroll.

=== Jordan ===
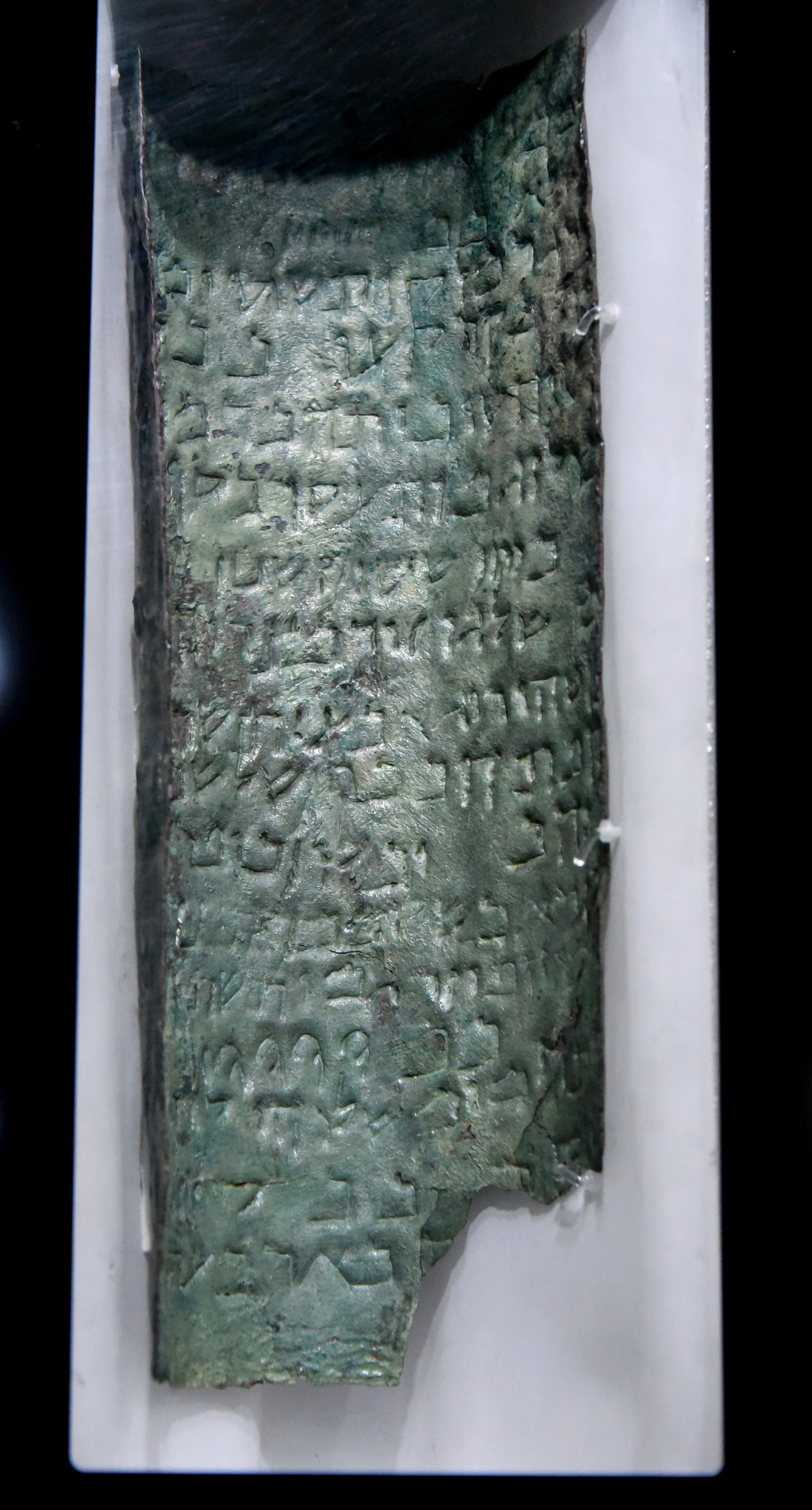
Strip of the Copper Scroll from Qumran Cave 3 written in the Hebrew Mishnaic dialect, on display at the Jordan Museum, Amman

Some of the collection held by the Jordanian government prior to 1967 was stored in Amman rather than at the Palestine Archaeological Museum in East Jerusalem. As a consequence, that part of the collection remained in Jordanian hands under their Department of Antiquities. Since 2013, the part of the collection held by Jordan has been on display at The Jordan Museum in Amman. Among the display items are artefacts from the Qumran site and the Copper Scroll.

== Ownership, forgeries, and copyright ==
Advertisement in The Wall Street Journal dated 1 June 1954 for four of the "Dead Sea Scrolls"

Upon their discovery in 1947 in what was then Mandatory Palestine, the Dead Sea Scrolls were first moved to the Palestine Archaeological Museum, which operated under the administration of an international board, until it was nationalized by Jordan's King Hussein in November 1966. Following the Jordanian annexation of the West Bank (including East Jerusalem) in the aftermath of the 1948 Arab–Israeli War, the museum's management become the responsibility of Jordan.

Following the 1967 Arab–Israeli War, Jordan was defeated and Israel began to occupy the West Bank and East Jerusalem. The Palestine Archeological Museum (renamed the Rockefeller Archeological Museum) fell under Israeli administration, and the Dead Sea Scrolls collection held there was moved to the Shrine of the Book. Israel claims ownership of the Dead Sea Scrolls collection currently housed at the Israel Museum. This claimed ownership is contested by both Jordan and the Palestinian Authority.

Parties involved	Party role	Explanation of role
Jordan	Disputant; minority owner	Alleges that the Dead Sea Scrolls were stolen from the Palestine Archaeological Museum (now the Rockefeller Museum) operated by Jordan from 1966 until the Six-Day War when advancing Israeli forces took control of the museum, and that therefore they fall under the rules of the 1954 Hague Convention for the Protection of Cultural Property in the Event of Armed Conflict. Jordan regularly demands their return and petitions third-party countries that host the scrolls to return them to Jordan instead of to Israel, claiming they have legal documents that prove Jordanian ownership of the scrolls.
Israel	Disputant; current majority holder	After the Six-Day War Israel seized the scrolls and moved them to the Shrine of the Book in the Israel Museum. Israel disputes Jordan's claim and states that Jordan never lawfully possessed the scrolls since it was an unlawful occupier of the museum and region.
Palestine	Disputant	The Palestinian Authority also claims ownership of the scrolls.

=== First findings' path, 1946-1954 ===
Arrangements with the Bedouins left the very first scroll findings in the hands of a third party until a profitable sale of them could be negotiated. That third party, George Isha'ya, was a member of the Syriac Orthodox Church, who soon contacted St Mark's Monastery in the hope of getting an appraisal of the nature of the texts. News of the find then reached Metropolitan Athanasius Yeshue Samuel, better known as Mar Samuel. After examining the scrolls and suspecting their antiquity, Mar Samuel expressed an interest in purchasing them. Four scrolls found their way into his hands: the Isaiah Scroll (1QIsa^{a}), the Community Rule, the Habakkuk Pesher (a commentary on the book of Habakkuk), and the Genesis Apocryphon. More scrolls soon surfaced in the antiquities market, and Professor Eleazer Sukenik and Professor Benjamin Mazar, archaeologists at Hebrew University, soon found themselves in possession of three, The War Scroll, Thanksgiving Hymns, and another, more fragmented, Isaiah Scroll (1QIsa^{b}).

Four of the Dead Sea Scrolls eventually went up for sale in an advertisement on 1 June 1954, The Wall Street Journal. On 1 July 1954, the scrolls, after delicate negotiations and accompanied by three people including Mar Samuel, arrived at the Waldorf-Astoria Hotel in New York. They were purchased by Professor Mazar and the son of Professor Sukenik, Yigael Yadin, for $250,000 (approximately $3,000,000 in 2025 dollars), and brought to Jerusalem.

=== Forgeries since 2002 ===
Since 2002, many forgeries of Dead Sea Scrolls have appeared on black markets. In 2020, the Museum of the Bible in the United States (also known as Green Collection) reported that all 16 purported "Dead Sea Scroll fragments" they had acquired between 2009 and 2014 were in fact modern forgeries.

=== Collections holding DSS ===
List of collections holding DSS fragments and claiming ownerships
Claimed owner	Year acquired	Number of fragments owned
Israel Museum – Government of Israel	1967	> 15,000
The Schøyen Collection owned by Martin Schøyen	1980; 1994; 1995	115
The Jordan Museum – Government of Jordan	1947–1956	> 25
Southwestern Baptist Theological Seminary	2009; 2010; 2012	8
Azusa Pacific University	2009	5
Ashland Theological Seminary		1
ISAC Museum, Institute for the Study of Ancient Cultures (previously Oriental Institute), University of Chicago	1956	1
Lanier Theological Library		1
Pasadena private collection		1
Syrian Orthodox Church's eastern U.S. archdiocese		1

=== Copyright disputes ===
There are three types of documents relating to the Dead Sea Scrolls in which copyright status can be considered ambiguous:

- the documents themselves
- images taken of the documents
- reproductions of the documents

This ambiguity arises from differences in copyright law across different countries and the variable interpretation of such law.

In 1992 a copyright case Qimron v. Shanks was brought before the Israeli District court by scholar Elisha Qimron against Hershel Shanks of the Biblical Archaeology Society for violations of United States copyright law regarding his publishing of reconstructions of Dead Sea Scroll texts done by Qimron in A Facsimile Edition of the Dead Sea Scrolls which were included without his permission. Qimron's suit against the Biblical Archaeology Society was done on the grounds that the research they had published was his intellectual property as he had reconstructed about 40% of the published text. In 1993, the district court Judge Dalia Dorner ruled for the plaintiff, Elisha Qimron, in context of both United States and Israeli copyright law and granted the highest compensation allowed by law for aggravation in compensation against Hershel Shanks and others. In an appeal in 2000 in front of Judge Aharon Barak, the verdict was upheld in Israeli Supreme Court in Qimron's favour. The court case established the two main principles from which facsimiles are examined under copyright law of the United States and Israel: authorship and originality.

The court's ruling not only affirms that the "deciphered text" of the scrolls can fall under copyright of individuals or groups, but makes it clear that the Dead Sea Scrolls themselves do not fall under this copyright law and scholars have a degree of, in the words of U.S. copyright law professor David Nimmer, "freedom" in access. Nimmer has shown how this freedom was in the theory of law applicable, but how it did not exist in reality as the IAA tightly controlled access to the scrolls and photographs of the scrolls.

== See also ==
- Ancient Hebrew writings
- Book of Mysteries
- Cairo Geniza
- Jordan Lead Codices
- Ketef Hinnom scrolls (7th/6th century BCE), oldest items containing biblical text (a variation of Numbers 6:24–26 etc.)
- Nag Hammadi library
- Oxyrhynchus Papyri
- Teacher of Righteousness

== Bibliography ==
Books

- Abegg Jr., Martin; Bowley, James E.; Cook, Edward M.; Tov, Emanuel (2003). The Dead Sea Scrolls Concordance. Vol. 1. Leiden: Brill. ISBN 90-04-12521-3.
- Allegro, John Marco (1979). The Dead Sea Scrolls and the Christian Myth. Devon: Westbridge Books. ISBN 0-7153-7680-2.
- Berg, Simon (2009). Insights into the Dead Sea Scrolls: A Beginner's Guide. Charleston: BookSurge Publishing. ISBN 978-1-5466-3831-5.
- Boccaccini, Gabriele (1998). Beyond the Essene Hypothesis: The Parting of Ways between Qumran and Enochic Judaism. Grand Rapids: Eerdmans. ISBN 978-0-8028-4360-9.
- Burrows, Millar (1978) [1955]. The Dead Sea Scrolls. New York: Viking. ISBN 0-517-62535-0.
- Charlesworth, James H. (1995). "The Theologies of the Dead Sea Scrolls". In Ringgren, H. (ed.). The Faith of Qumran: Theology of the Dead Sea Scrolls. New York: Crossroad. pp. xv–xxi. ISBN 978-0-8245-1258-3.
- Chernoivanenko, Vitaly. "The Jerusalem Theory of the Dead Sea Scrolls Authorship: Origins, Evolution, and Discussions," in Ukrainian Orientalistics: Special Issue on Jewish Studies, Кyiv: NaUKMA Omeljan Pritsak Center for Oriental Studies, 2011: 9–29.
- Collins, John J., Apocalypticism in the Dead Sea Scrolls, New York: Routledge, 1997.
- Collins, John Joseph; Evans, Craig Alan (2006). Christian beginnings and the Dead Sea scrolls. Grand Rapids (Mich.): Baker academic. ISBN 978-0801028373.
- Cook, Edward M. (1994). Solving the Mysteries of the Dead Sea Scrolls: New Light on the Bible, Grand Rapids, MI: Zondervan.
- Cross, Frank Moore (1995). The Ancient Library of Qumran, 3rd ed., Minneapolis: Fortress Press. ISBN 0800628071
- Davies, A. Powell (1956). The Meaning of the Dead Sea Scrolls. Signet. ISBN 9780451613288
- Davies, Philip Roper; Brooke, George J.; Callaway, Phillip R. (2002). The Complete World of the Dead Sea Scrolls. London: Thames & Hudson. ISBN 0500051119.
- de Vaux, Roland, Archaeology and the Dead Sea Scrolls (Schweich Lectures of the British Academy, 1959). Oxford: Oxford University Press, 1973. ISBN 9780197259313
- Dimant, Devorah, and Uriel Rappaport (eds.), The Dead Sea Scrolls: Forty Years of Research, Leiden and Jerusalem: E.J. Brill, Magnes Press, Yad Izhak Ben-Zvi, 1992.
- Eisenman, Robert H., The Dead Sea Scrolls and the First Christians, Shaftesbury: Element, 1996.
- Eisenman, Robert H.; O. Wise, Michael (1993). The Dead Sea Scrolls Uncovered: The First Complete Translation and Interpretation of 50 Key Documents Withheld for Over 35 Years. Shaftesbury: Element. ISBN 978-0-14-023250-9.1992.
- Eisenman, Robert H. and James Robinson, A Facsimile Edition of the Dead Sea Scrolls 2 vol., Washington, D.C.: Biblical Archaeology Society, 1991.
- Fitzmyer, Joseph A., Responses to 101 Questions on the Dead Sea Scrolls, Paulist Press 1992, ISBN 0809133482
- Galor, Katharina, Jean-Baptiste Humbert, and Jürgen Zangenberg. Qumran: The Site of the Dead Sea Scrolls: Archaeological Interpretations and Debates: Proceedings of a Conference held at Brown University, 17–19 November 2002, Edited by Florentino García-Martínez, Studies on the Texts of the Desert of Judah 57. Leiden: Brill, 2006.
- García-Martinez, Florentino, The Dead Sea Scrolls Translated: The Qumran Texts in English, (Translated from Spanish into English by Wilfred G. E. Watson) (Leiden: E.J. Brill, 1994).
- García-Martínez, Florentino, Eibert J.C. Tigchelaar (eds). The Dead Sea Scrolls Study Edition, Brill, 1999
- Gaster, Theodor H., The Dead Sea Scriptures, Peter Smith Pub Inc., 1976. ISBN 0844667021
- Golb, Norman, Who Wrote the Dead Sea Scrolls? The Search for the Secret of Qumran, New York: Scribner, 1995.
- Golb, Norman, On the Jerusalem Origin of the Dead Sea Scrolls Archived 10 June 2010 at the Wayback Machine, University of Chicago Oriental Institute, 5 June 2009.
- Heline, Theodore, Dead Sea Scrolls, New Age Bible & Philosophy Center, 1957, Reprint edition 1987, ISBN 0933963165
- Hirschfeld, Yizhar, Qumran in Context: Reassessing the Archaeological Evidence, Peabody: Hendrickson Publishers, 2004.
- Israeli, Raphael, Routledge Piracy in Qumran: The Battle over the Scrolls of the Pre-Christ Era], Transaction Publishers: 2008 ISBN 978-1412807036
- Khabbaz, C., "Les manuscrits de la mer Morte et le secret de leurs auteurs", Beirut, 2006. (Ce livre identifie les auteurs des fameux manuscrits de la mer Morte et dévoile leur secret).
- Magen, Yizhak, and Yuval Peleg, The Qumran Excavations 1993–2004: Preliminary Report, JSP 6 (Jerusalem: Israel Antiquities Authority, 2007) Download Archived 28 November 2007 at the Wayback Machine
- Magen, Yizhak, and Yuval Peleg, "Back to Qumran: Ten years of Excavations and Research, 1993–2004," in The Site of the Dead Sea Scrolls: Archaeological Interpretations and Debates (Studies on the Texts of the Desert of Judah 57), Brill, 2006 (pp. 55–116).
- Magness, Jodi, The Archaeology of Qumran and the Dead Sea Scrolls, Grand Rapids: Eerdmans, 2002.
- Maier, Johann, The Temple Scroll, [German edition was 1978], (Sheffield:JSOT Press [Supplement 34], 1985).
- Milik, Józef Tadeusz, Ten Years of Discovery in the Wilderness of Judea, London: SCM, 1959.
- Muro, E. A., "The Greek Fragments of Enoch from Qumran Cave 7 (7Q4, 7Q8, &7Q12 = 7QEn gr = Enoch 103:3–4, 7–8)." Revue de Qumran 18, no. 70 (1997): 307, 12, pl. 1.
- O'Callaghan-Martínez, Josep, Cartas Cristianas Griegas del Siglo V, Barcelona: E. Balmes, 1963.
- Qimron, Elisha, The Hebrew of the Dead Sea Scrolls, Harvard Semitic Studies, 1986. (This is a serious discussion of the Hebrew language of the scrolls.)
- Rengstorf, Karl Heinrich, Hirbet Qumran und die Bibliothek vom Toten Meer, Translated by J.R. Wilkie. Stuttgart: W. Kohlhammer, 1960.
- Roitman, Adolfo, ed. A Day at Qumran: The Dead Sea Sect and Its Scrolls. Jerusalem: The Israel Museum, 1998.
- Sanders, James A., ed. Dead Sea scrolls: The Psalms scroll of Qumrân Cave 11 (11QPsa), (1965) Oxford, Clarendon Press.
- Schiffman, Lawrence H. (1995). Reclaiming the Dead Sea scrolls: the History of Judaism, the Background of Christianity, the Lost Library of Qumran. New York: Doubleday. ISBN 0385481217., (Schiffman has suggested two plausible theories of origin and identity – a Sadducean splinter group, or perhaps an Essene group with Sadducean roots.) Excerpts of this book can be read at COJS: Dead Sea Scrolls.
- Schiffman, Lawrence H., and James C. VanderKam, eds. Encyclopedia of the Dead Sea Scrolls. 2 vols. New York: Oxford University Press, 1999.
- Shanks, Hershel, The Mystery and Meaning of the Dead Sea Scrolls, Vintage Press 1999, ISBN 0679780890 (recommended introduction to their discovery and history of their scholarship)
- Stegemann, Hartmut. "The Qumran Essenes: Local Members of the Main Jewish Union in Late Second Temple Times." pp. 83–166 in The Madrid Qumran Congress: Proceedings of the International Congress on the Dead Sea Scrolls, Madrid, 18–21 March 1991, Edited by J. Trebolle Barrera and L. Vegas Mountainer. Vol. 11 of Studies on the Texts of the Desert of Judah. Leiden: Brill, 1992.
- Thiede, Carsten Peter (2000). The Dead Sea Scrolls and the Jewish Origins of Christianity. London: Palgrave Macmillan. ISBN 0-312-29361-5.
- Thiering, Barbara, Jesus the Man, New York: Atria, 2006.
- Thiering, Barbara, Jesus and the Riddle of the Dead Sea Scrolls (ISBN 0060677821), New York: HarperCollins, 1992
- Yadin, Yigael (1985). The Temple Scroll: The Hidden Law of the Dead Sea Sect. New York: Random House.

Other sources

- Dead Sea Scrolls Study Vol 1: 1Q1 – 4Q273, Vol. 2: 4Q274 – 11Q31, (compact disc), Logos Research Systems, Inc., (contains the non-biblical portion of the scrolls with Hebrew and Aramaic transcriptions in parallel with English translations)
- Comprehensive Cross Reference interactive module for Dead Sea Scrolls, Josephus, Philo, Nag Hammadi Library, Pseudepigrapha, Old Testament Apocrypha, New Testament Apocrypha, Plato, Pythagoras, Dhammapada, Egyptian Book of the Dead, Tacitus, Talmud, New and Old Testaments, Apostolic and Early Church Fathers
- Dead Sea Scrolls Electronic Library Biblical Texts https://scholarlyeditions.brill.com/dsbo/
- Leon Levy Dead Sea Scrolls Digital Library http://www.deadseascrolls.org.il/home
- Israel Museum Scrolls Online http://dss.collections.imj.org.il/
- Cambridge Digital Library
  - Damascus Document (CD): http://cudl.lib.cam.ac.uk/search?keyword=damascus%20document&page=1&x=0&y=0
  - Ben Sira Genizah Fragments: http://cudl.lib.cam.ac.uk/search?keyword=ben%20sira&page=1&x=0&y=0
  - The Book of Ben Sira: http://ancientworldonline.blogspot.co.il/2013/12/the-book-of-ben-sira.html
- Scripta Qumranica Electronica Digital Scholarly Editions https://www.qumranica.org/blog/
- Elisha Qimron, The Qumran Texts https://zenodo.org/record/3737950#.XrQIeqhvaUl Archived 14 July 2017 at the Wayback Machine

== Online Journals ==
- Dead Sea Discoveries
- Meghillot
- Metatron
- Revue de Qumran
