= List of manuscripts from Qumran Cave 11 =

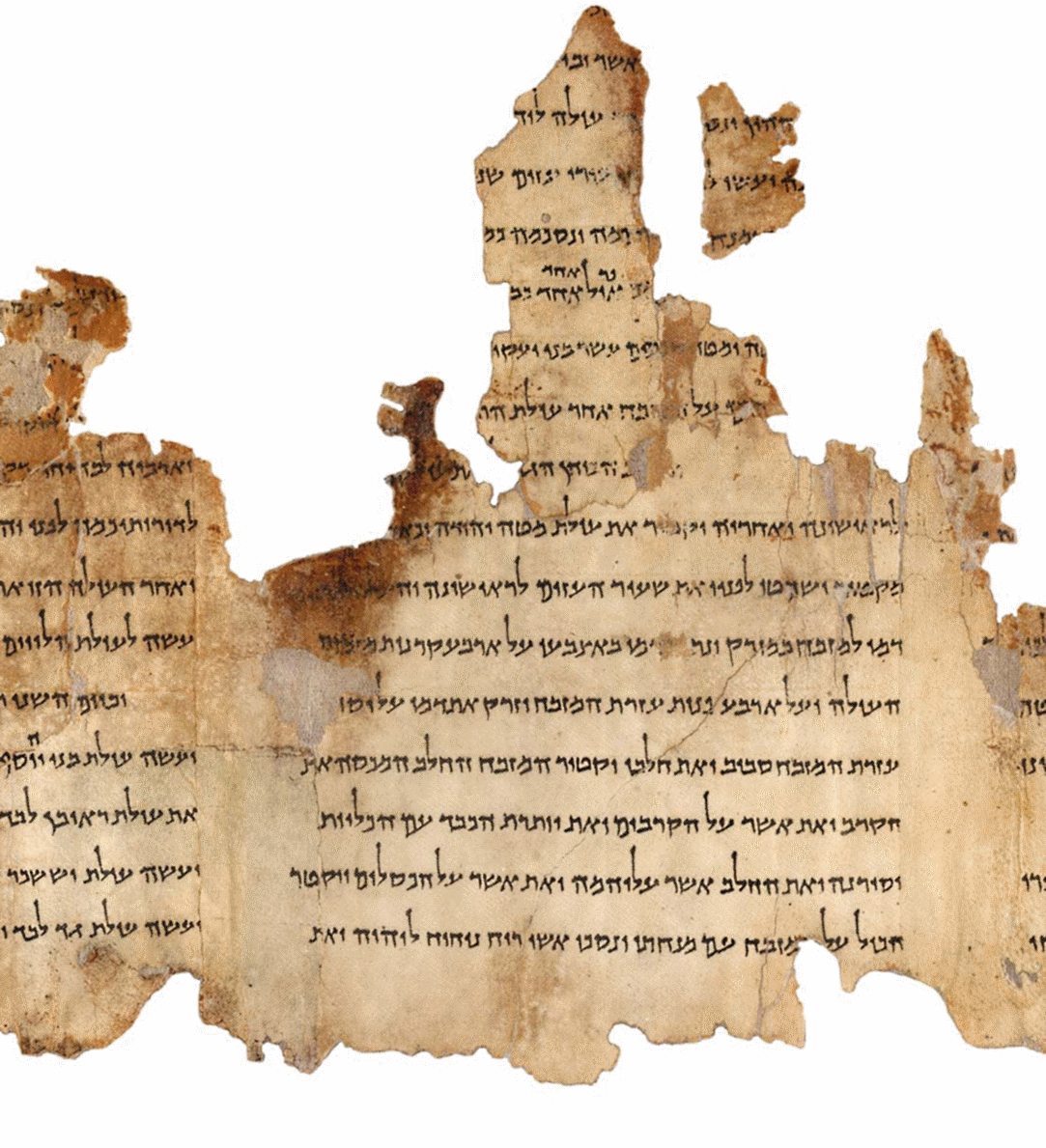
- A view of part of the Temple Scroll that was found in Qumran Cave 11.
- Material: Parchment, leather
- Writing: Hebrew, Aramaic
- Created: Est. 408 BCE to 318 CE
- Discovered: 1956
- Present location: Qumran

The following is a list of the Dead Sea Scrolls from the cave 11 near Qumran.

== Description ==
Wadi Qumran Cave 11 was discovered in 1956 and yielded 21 texts of Dead Sea Scrolls, some of which were quite lengthy. The Temple Scroll, so called because more than half of it pertains to the construction of the Temple of Jerusalem, was found in Cave 11, and is by far the longest scroll. It is now 26.7 feet (8.15 m) long. Its original length may have been over 28 feet (8.75 m). The Temple Scroll was regarded by Yigael Yadin as "The Torah According to the Essenes". On the other hand, Hartmut Stegemann, a contemporary and friend of Yadin, believed the scroll was not to be regarded as such, but was a document without exceptional significance. Stegemann notes that it is not mentioned or cited in any known Essene writing.

Found also in Cave 11 was the Paleo-Hebrew Leviticus scroll, and an eschatological fragment about the biblical figure Melchizedek (11Q13). Cave 11 also produced a copy of Jubilees.

According to former chief editor of the DSS editorial team John Strugnell, there are at least four privately owned scrolls from Cave 11, that have not yet been made available for scholars. Among them is a complete Aramaic manuscript of the Book of Enoch·.

== List of manuscripts ==
Some resources for more complete information on the scrolls are the book by Emanuel Tov, "Revised Lists of the Texts from the Judaean Desert" for a complete list of all of the Dead Sea Scroll texts, as well as the online webpages for the Shrine of the Book and the Leon Levy Collection, both of which present photographs and images of the scrolls and fragments themselves for closer study. Information is not always comprehensive, as content for many scrolls has not yet been fully published.

Fragment or scroll identifier	Fragment or scroll name	Alternative identifier	English Bible Association	Language	Date/script	Description	Reference
Qumran Cave 11
11QpaleoLev^{a}	Paleo-Leviticus^{a}	11Q1	Leviticus 4:24–26; 10:4–7; 11:27–32; 13:3–9; 13:39–43; 14:16–21; 14:52–15:5; 16:2–4; 16:34–17:5; 18:27–19:4; 20:1–6; 21:6–11; 22:21–27; 23:22–29; 24:9–14; 25:28–36; 26:17–26; 27:11–19	Hebrew	Herodian/palaeo-Hebrew script		
11QLev^{b}	Leviticus^{b}	11Q2	Leviticus	Hebrew	Herodian/palaeo-Hebrew script		
11QDeut	Deuteronomy	11Q3	Deuteronomy 1:4–5; 2:28–30	Hebrew	50 CE Late Herodian		
11QEzek	Ezekiel	11Q4	Ezekiel	Hebrew	Herodian		
11QPs	The Great Psalms Scroll	11Q5	Psalms	Hebrew	Herodian	A unique Psalms scroll with only about a quarter of the Masoretic psalms (in atypical order), three Syriac psalms, one from Ben Sira, and the only known copies of three more unique psalms—Plea for Deliverance, Apostrophe to Zion, and Hymn to the Creator—all of which are unattested by other sources, as well as the short text of David's Compositions.	
11QPs^{a}	Psalms	11Q5		Hebrew	Herodian		
11QPs^{b}	Psalms	11Q6	Psalm 77:18–21; 78:1; 109:3–4; 118:1; 118:15–16; 119:163–165; 133:1–3; 141:10; 144:1–2	Hebrew	Herodian		
11QPs^{c}	Psalms	11Q7	Psalm 2:1–8; 9:3–7; 12:5–9; 13:1–6; 14:1–6; 17:9–15; 18:1–12; 19:4–8; 25:2–7	Hebrew	Herodian		
11QPs^{d}	Psalms	11Q8	Psalm 6:2–4; 9:3–6; 18:26–29; 18:39–42; 36:13; 37:1–4; 39:13–14; 40:1; 43:1–3; 45:6–8; 59:5–8; 68:1–5; 68:14–18; 78:5–12; 81:4–9; 86:11–14; 115:16–18; 116:1	Hebrew	Herodian		
11QPs^{e}	Psalms	11Q9	Psalm 50:3–7	Hebrew	Herodian		
11QtgJob	Targum Job	11Q10	Job	Aramaic	Herodian	A unique Aramaic translation of the Book of Job; presents Job somewhat more favourably.	
11QapocrPs	Apocryphal Psalms	11Q11	Psalm 91	Hebrew	Herodian	Apocryphal paraphrase of Psalms 91	
11QJub	Jubilees	11Q12		Hebrew	Herodian	Ethiopic text of Jubilees 4:6–11; 4:13–14; 4:16–17; 4:29–31; 5:1–2; 12:15–17; 12:28–29	
11QMelch	Melchizedek	11Q13	Contains Pesher/commentary on Leviticus 25:13; Deuteronomy 15:2; Psalm 7:8–9; 82:2; Isaiah 52:7; Daniel 9:25; Leviticus 25:9	Hebrew	50–25 BCE or 75–50 BCE Late Hasmonean or Early Herodian	Describes a tenth jubilee and portrays Melchizedek as a messianic agent of salvation, using similar language to that used for Jesus in Hebrews, such as "Heavenly Prince Melchizedek"	
11Q Sefer ha-Milhamah	Sefer ha-Milhamah ("The Book of War")	11Q14		Hebrew	Herodian	An account of the final eschatological battle of the Israelites and the Kittim (Romans), including a messianic figure named the "Prince of the Congregation."	
11QHymns^{a}	Hymns	11Q15		Hebrew	Herodian		
11QHymns^{b}	Hymns	11Q16		Hebrew	Herodian		
11QShirShabb	Songs of the Sabbath Sacrifice	11Q17		Hebrew	Herodian	Collection of 13 hymns describing a heavenly temple service.	
11QNJ	New Jerusalem	11Q18		Aramaic	Herodian	Appears to be an apocalyptic vision, including some architectural details of a very large city (cf. Ezekiel and Revelation)	
11QT^{a}	Temple Scroll	11Q19		Hebrew	Herodian	Rephrases the Pentateuch laws in the spirit of Deuteronomy, seeks to resolve biblical legal conflicts and expand ritual laws.	
11QT^{b}	Temple Scroll	11Q20		Hebrew	Herodian	Rephrases the Pentateuch laws in the spirit of Deuteronomy, seeks to resolve biblical legal conflicts and expand ritual laws.	
11QT^{c}	Temple Scroll	11Q21		Hebrew	Herodian	Rephrases the Pentateuch laws in the spirit of Deuteronomy, seeks to resolve biblical legal conflicts and expand ritual laws.	
11Q Unidentified	Unidentified	11Q22		Hebrew	Hasmonean	Unidentified fragments.	
11Q Unidentified	Unidentified	11Q23		Hebrew	Hellenistic-Roman	Unidentified fragments.	
11Q Unidentified	Unidentified	11Q24		Aramaic	Hasmonean	Unidentified fragments.	
11Q Unidentified	Unidentified	11Q25		Hebrew	Herodian	Unidentified fragments.	
11Q Unidentified	Unidentified	11Q26		Hebrew	Herodian	Unidentified fragments.	
11Q Unidentified	Unidentified	11Q27		Hebrew	Hellenistic-Roman	Unidentified fragments.	
11Q Unidentified	Unidentified	11Q28		Hebrew	Hellenistic-Roman	Unidentified fragments.	
		11Q29				Serekh ha-Yahad related	
11Q Unidentified	Unidentified	11Q30		Hebrew	Herodian	Unidentified fragments.	
11Q Unidentified	Unidentified	11Q31				Unidentified fragment	
11Q9999	Unidentified				Hellenistic-Roman		

== See also ==
- Biblical manuscripts
- Septuagint manuscripts
- List of Hebrew Bible manuscripts

== Bibliography ==
- Fitzmyer, Joseph A. (2008). A Guide to the Dead Sea Scrolls and Related Literature. Grand Rapids, MI: William B. Eerdmans Publishing Company. ISBN 9780802862419.
- Humbert, Jean-Baptiste; Fidanzio, Marcello, eds. (2019). Khirbet Qumrân and Aïn Feshkha IV A: Qumran Cave 11Q: Archaeology and New Scroll Fragments. Vandenhoeck & Ruprecht. ISBN 978-3-647-56469-2.
