= Psalm 151 =

Orthodox psalm

- ← Psalm 150 Psalm 152 →
- Book: Book of Psalms

Psalm 151 is a short psalm concerning the story of David and Goliath found in most copies of the Septuagint (LXX), but not in the Masoretic Text of the Hebrew Bible. The title given to the psalm in the Septuagint indicates that it is supernumerary, as no number is affixed to it. The psalm is ascribed to David.

The title of the psalm states that it was written by David after his battle with Goliath. The psalm assumes familiarity with other Biblical passages, from which it draws phraseology.

It is preserved in the Latin, Hebrew (DSS), Greek (LXX), and some manuscripts of the Syriac Peshitta. The psalm is used liturgically in the Latin Church, Armenian Church, and Coptic Church.

== Dead Sea Scrolls discovery ==
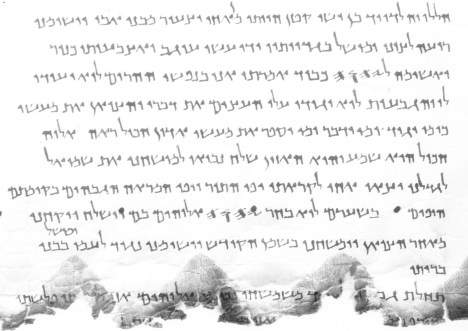
Dead Sea Scroll 11QPs(a), a.k.a. 11Q5

For many years scholars believed that Psalm 151 was originally composed in Greek, based on the view that "there is no evidence that Psalm 151 ever existed in Hebrew."

However, Psalm 151 appears in much greater length as two separate short compositions in Hebrew which scholars now agree served as the basis for Psalm 151. These compositions along with several canonical and non-canonical psalms appear in the scroll known as "The Great Psalms Scroll" or "11Q5". This scroll, dating from the 1st century, was discovered in 1956. The editio princeps of this manuscript was first published in 1963 by James A. Sanders.

“Psalm 151a” from this scroll provides the source material for verses 1–5 of the Greek Psalm 151, while the remaining verses are derived from another composition known as “Psalm 151b”, which is only partially preserved. The composer of the Greek Psalm apparently brought the two Hebrew psalms together in a manner that significantly changes their meaning and structure, but the influence of the Hebrew originals is still readily apparent. Where parts of the Greek version sometimes seem to make little sense or are ambiguous, the Hebrew text sheds light on the intended message or meaning. In comparison to the Hebrew text, Sanders regards the Greek text of this psalm to be in places “desiccated,” “meaningless,” “truncated,” “absurd,” “jumbled,” and “disappointingly different,” all as a result of its having been “made from a truncated amalgamation of the two Hebrew psalms.” On details of translation, structure, and meaning of this psalm, see also the works of Skehan, Brownlee, Carmignac, John Strugnell, Rabinowitz, Dupont-Sommer, and Flint.

== Canonicity ==
Athanasius of Alexandria mentions this psalm as being "especially the Psalm of David" and as being suited to occasions in which "weak as you are, you people are chosen for some position of authority among the brethren."

The Eastern Orthodox and Oriental Orthodox churches accept Psalm 151 as canonical. Protestants and most forms of Judaism consider it apocryphal. However, it is found in some Catholic Bibles in editions of the Vulgate (though the Catholic Church considers it noncanonical) as well as in some ecumenical translations (e.g., the Revised Standard Version).

== Liturgical usage ==
=== Western usage ===
In the Latin Church, Psalm 151 has a liturgical presence as the Matins responsory “Deus omnium exauditor est” in the Breviary’s Historia Regum. The responsory quotes lines from Psalm 151 and pairs them with the verse from 1 Samuel 17:37, catalogued in the Corpus Antiphonalium Officii as CAO 6430 (verse 6430a). Manuscript evidence from Roman-use sources places it at different Sundays after Pentecost (e.g., II, IV, V), indicating its circulation within the Western family of books.

In the medieval English Sarum Use, the responsory “Deus omnium exauditor est” (CAO 006430), which draws on Psalm 151 and pairs it with the verse “Dominus, qui eripuit me de ore leonis…” (1 Sam. 17:37), stands as the first Matins responsory of the Historia Regum; by its incipit, Sarum books even nickname the First Sunday after Trinity “Deus omnium,” marking the start of the Kings lections and their proper responsories.

Psalm 151 is still cited once in the Extraordinary Form of the Roman Breviary as a responsory of the series from the books of Kings, the second in the Roman Breviary, together with 1 Samuel 17:37 (Greek 1–2 Kings is linked to the traditional 1–2 Samuel, and Greek 3–4 Kings to the traditional 1–2 Kings) in a text slightly different from that of the Vulgate.

In the early medieval Latin West, Psalm 151 was known and transmitted. It was included in Old Latin versions of the Bible and incorporated into manuscripts of the Vulgate. In Anglo-Saxon England, the psalm appears in numerous psalter manuscripts—approximately half of the surviving examples—where it is typically placed after Psalm 150 among the canticles and marked as "outside the number". Major manuscripts such as the Vespasian Psalter, the Eadwine Psalter, and Codex Amiatinus include the text, demonstrating its circulation within learned and liturgical contexts. Its inclusion in liturgical psalters indicates that it was copied, read, and used within the devotional and liturgical culture of the Western Church.

=== Armenian liturgy ===
In the Armenian Church, Psalm 151 is recited as part of the Matins sequence of biblical poetic material, which includes canticles from the Old and New Testaments, Psalms 51, 148–150, and 113 (numbering according to the Septuagint). The Armenian version of Psalm 151 is close to the Septuagint, with some variation. Where verse 2 in Greek reads αἱ χεῖρές μου ἐποίησαν ὄργανον οἱ δάκτυλοί μου ἤροσαν ψαλτήριον "My hands made an instrument, my fingers fashioned the lyre," the Armenian has, Ձերք իմ արարին զսաղմոսարանս եւ մատունք իմ կազմեցին զգործի աւրհնութեան "My hands made the lyres (Armenian զսաղմոսարանս can then means also 'Psalm-books' 'psalters') and my fingers fashioned the instrument of blessing."

=== Coptic liturgy ===
In the Coptic Church, Psalm 151 is recited at the start of the Bright Saturday Vigil, also known as the Apocalypse Vigil. The words of the psalm are interpreted as a Messianic prophecy concerning Christ's defeat of Satan.

=== Eastern Orthodox liturgy ===
Psalm 151 is typically included in liturgical Psalters; however, it is not part of the weekly Kathisma cycle of readings, nor is it appointed to be read at any service.

Verse 4 ("He sent out his angel," etc.) is chanted among the verses of the Polyeleos sung at Matins on November 8, the feast of the Archangels.

== English versions ==
There are a number of English translations now in the public domain. The first English translation was William Whiston in his A collection of authentick records belonging to the Old and New Testament. published in 1727. This was followed by Thomson's Translation by Charles Thomson in 1808, followed by The Septuagint with Apocrypha: Greek and English translated by Lancelot Charles Lee Brenton in 1854. It was also translated by Adam Clarke in his 1831 commentary on the Bible.

It is also available in Orthodox or ecumenical editions of modern translations since 1977 (Revised Standard Version, New Revised Standard Version, English Standard Version, Orthodox Study Bible, Contemporary English Version, and the Common English Bible).

It is included in Sabine Baring-Gould's Legends of the Patriarchs and Prophets, William Digby Seymour's Hebrew Psalter, and William Ralph Churton's Uncanonical and Apocryphal Scriptures. William Wright published a translation of the Syriac version in the Proceedings of the Society of Biblical Archaeology, June 1887, and A. A. Brockway published a translation from the Coptic in the January 27, 1898 New York Times.

== Cultural influence ==
At the beginning of his first address to his Council of State, Emperor Haile Selassie of Ethiopia recited this psalm in full.

== Other references to Psalm 151 ==
The term "Psalm 151" has been used in other contexts, including modern popular culture. In these instances, the term does not refer to the supernumerary psalm included in the Orthodox canon, but instead as a metaphor (such as to the abstract concept of a new and "sacred" work of poetry or song).

- The TV show Touched by an Angel, Season 5, Episode 9 (originally aired 15 November 1998) is titled "Psalm 151" with a song sung by Wynonna Judd called "Testify to Love". In the episode, she composes the song for her dying son.
- In 1993, Péter Eötvös composed "Psalm 151 – In Memoriam Frank Zappa" for solo or four percussionists.
- Christian rock band Jacob's Trouble wrapped up their 1989 Door into Summer LP with track 11, "Psalm 151."
- Rock artist Ezra Furman included a self-penned song entitled "Psalm 151" on her 2018 LP Transangelic Exodus; she later admitted she was unaware of Psalm 151's existence.
- The song "My Favorite Mutiny" from the album Pick a Bigger Weapon by The Coup (ft. Talib Kweli and Black Thought) contains the lyric "Tryin' to find Psalm number 151."
- Hip-hop artist Jay-Z uses "Psalm 151" as a metaphor in the 2022 song "God Did" by DJ Khaled.

== Text ==
The following table shows the Koine Greek text in the Septuagint and the English translation from the New Revised Standard Version.

#	English	Greek
	This psalm is ascribed to David as his own composition (though it is outside the number), after he had fought in single combat with Goliath.	Οὗτος ὁ ψαλμὸς ἰδιόγραφος εἰς Δαυΐδ καὶ ἔξωθεν τοῦ ἀριθμοῦ· ὅτε ἐμονομάχησε τῷ Γολιάθ.
1	I was small among my brothers, and the youngest in my father's house; I tended my father's sheep.	ΜΙΚΡΟΣ ἤμην ἐν τοῖς ἀδελφοῖς μου καὶ νεώτερος ἐν τῷ οἴκῳ τοῦ πατρός μου· ἐποίμαινον τὰ πρόβατα τοῦ πατρός μου.
2	My hands made a harp; my fingers fashioned a lyre.	αἱ χεῖρές μου ἐποίησαν ὄργανον, καὶ οἱ δάκτυλοί μου ἥρμοσαν ψαλτήριον.
3	And who will tell my Lord? The Lord Himself; it is He who hears.	καὶ τίς ἀναγγελεῖ τῷ Κυρίῳ μου; αὐτὸς Κύριος, αὐτὸς εἰσακούσει.
4	It was he who sent His messenger and took me from my father's sheep, and anointed me with his anointing oil.	αὐτὸς ἐξαπέστειλε τὸν ἄγγελον αὐτοῦ καὶ ἦρέ με ἐκ τῶν προβάτων τοῦ πατρός μου καὶ ἔχρισέ με ἐν τῷ ἐλαίῳ τῆς χρίσεως αὑτοῦ.
5	My brothers were handsome and tall, But the Lord was not pleased with them.	οἱ ἀδελφοί μου καλοὶ καὶ μεγάλοι, καὶ οὐκ εὐδόκησεν ἐν αὐτοῖς ὁ Κύριος.
6	I went out to meet the Philistine, and he cursed me by his idols.	ἐξῆλθον εἰς συνάντησιν τῷ ἀλλοφύλῳ, καὶ ἐπικατηράσατό με ἐν τοῖς εἰδώλοις αὐτοῦ·
7	But I drew his own sword; I beheaded him, and took away disgrace from the people of Israel.	ἐγὼ δέ, σπασάμενος τὴν παρ᾿ αὐτοῦ μάχαιραν, ἀπεκεφάλισα αὐτὸν καὶ ἦρα ὄνειδος ἐξ υἱῶν ᾿Ισραήλ.

The following table shows the Hebrew text of Psalms 151a and 151b, as found in the Great Psalms Scroll, alongside an English translation by Tyler F. Williams.

#	Hebrew	English
Psalm 151a
3	הללויה לדויד בן ישי	A Hallelujah of David son of Jesse.
3	קטן הייתי מןאחי	Smaller was I than my brothers
3	וצעיר מבני אבי	And the youngest of the sons of my father
4	וישימני רועה לצונו	And he made me shepherd of his flock
4	ומושל בגדיותיו	And ruler over his kids
4	ידי עשו עוגב	My hands made a (musical) instrument
4	ואצבעותי כנור	And my fingers a lyre
5	ואשימה ליהוה כבוד	And I rendered glory to the Lord
5	אמרתי אני בנפשי	I said within myself
5	ההרים לוא יעדו לו	The mountains do not witness to him,
6	והגבעות לוא יגידו	Nor do the hills declare;
6	עלו֯ העצים את דברי֯	The trees have cherished my words
6	והצואן את מעשי֯	And the flock my works.
7	כי מי יגדי ומי ידבר	For who can declare and who can speak,
7	ומי יספר את מעשי֯ אדון	And who can recount the works of the Lord?
7	הכול ראה אלוה	Everything has God seen,
8	הכול הוא שמע	everything has he heard,
8	והוא האזין	and he has heeded.
8	שלח נביאו למושחני	He sent his prophet to annoint me,
9	את שמואל לגדלני	Samuel, to make me great
9	יצאו אחי לקראתו	My brothers went out to meet him,
9	יפי התור ויפי המראה	Handsome of figure and handsome of appearance
9	הגבהים בקומתם	They were tall of stature
10	היפים בשערם	Handsome by their hair,
10	לוא בחר יהוה אלוהים בם	The Lord God did not choose them.
10	וישלח ויקחני מאחר הצואן	But he sent and took me from behind the flock
11	וימשחני בשמן הקודש	And annointed me with holy oil,
11	וישימני נגיד לעמו	And made me leader to his people
12	ומושל בבני בריתו	And ruler over the sons of his covenant
Psalm 151b
13	תחלת גב[ו]רה ה[דו]יד משמשחו נביא אלוהים	At the beginning of [Dav]id’s p[ow]er after the prophet of God had annointed him
13	אזי רא֯[י]תי פלשתי	Then I s[a]w a Philistine
14	מחרף ממ[ערכות האיוב]	Uttering defiances from the r[anks of the enemy].
14	אנוכי [ ] את	I [...] ’t [...]

== See also ==
- Psalms
- Deuterocanonical books in Orthodox Christianity
