= Paleo-Hebrew Leviticus Scroll =

Ancient Jewish religious manuscript found in 1956 among the Dead Sea scrolls

11QpaleoLev (Paleo-Hebrew Leviticus Scroll)
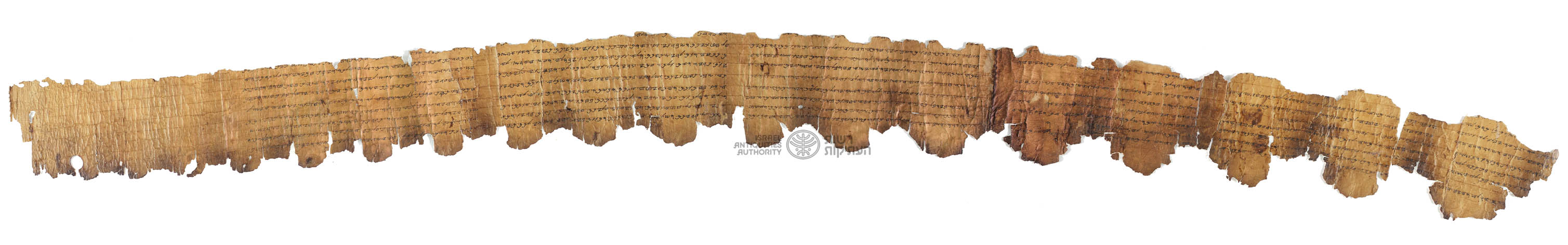
- The paleo-Hebrew Leviticus Scroll. Courtesy of The Leon Levy Dead Sea Scrolls Digital Library; IAA, photo: Shai Halevi

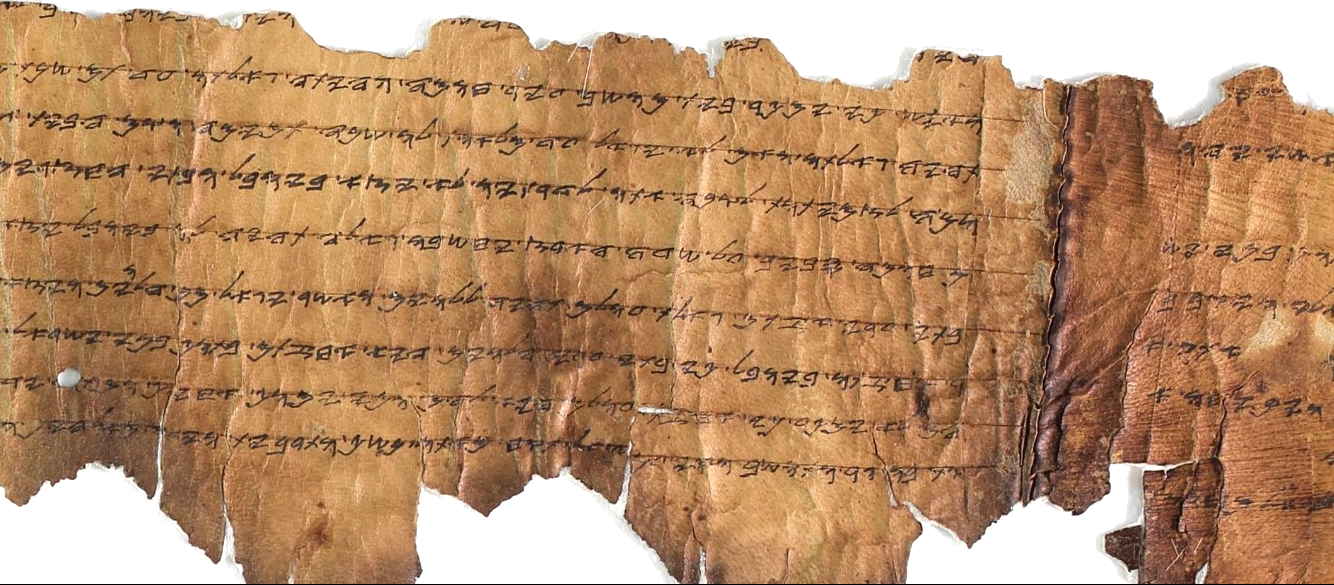
- Material: tanned leather or parchment
- Size: 100.5 cm. × 10.9 cm.
- Writing: Paleo-Hebrew characters
- Created: c. late 2nd–1st-century BC or 30 BC-68 AD
- Discovered: 1956
- Present location: IAA
- www.deadseascrolls.org.il/explore-the-archive/image/B-295277

Paleo-Hebrew Leviticus Scroll, known also as 11QpaleoLev, is an ancient text preserved in one of the Qumran group of caves, which provides a rare glimpse of the script used formerly by the Israelites in writing Torah scrolls during pre-exilic history. The fragmentary remains of the Torah scroll is written in the Paleo-Hebrew script and was found stashed away in cave no. 11 at Qumran, showing a portion of Leviticus. The scroll is thought to have been penned by the scribe between the late 2nd century BCE to early 1st century BCE, while others place its writing in the 1st century CE.

The Paleo-Hebrew Leviticus Scroll, although many centuries more recent than the well-known earlier ancient Paleo-Hebrew epigraphic materials, such as the Royal Steward inscription from Siloam, Jerusalem (8th century BCE), now in the Museum of the Ancient Orient, Istanbul, and the Phoenician inscription on the sarcophagus of King Eshmun-Azar at Sidon, dating to the fifth-fourth century BCE, the Lachish ostraca (ca. 6th-century BCE), the Gezer calendar (ca. 950–918 BCE), and the paleo-Hebrew sacerdotal blessing discovered in 1979 near the St Andrew's Church in Jerusalem, is of no less importance to palaeography—even though the manuscript is fragmentary and only partially preserved on leather parchment.

Today, the Paleo-Hebrew Leviticus Scroll (11QpaleoLev) is housed at the Israel Antiquities Authority (IAA), but is not on public display.

== Priority ==
For a period of time, Paleo-Leviticus—inscribed sometime after 200 BCE but before the end of the first century BCE--was considered the oldest extant fragment of a Torah scroll. The dating of a Paleo-Exodus scroll (4Q22) placed it in date range of 125–100 BCE, but there is an even older manuscript containing parts of Exodus (near the end of the book) and a small portion of Leviticus (at the beginning of the book) that was copied in 250 BCE (4Q17). 4Q17 is inscribed in the square alphabet adopted after the exile in Babylon—nevertheless its early date of transcription advances the 4Q17 fragment as the oldest extant fragment of the Torah known to us if the contents of Hinnom Scrolls are excluded from consideration (they are not parts of a larger work, but represent short extracts etc.).

The style of Paleo-Hebrew script in the Qumran fragments indicates that these manuscripts date to some time after the revolution of the Macabbees and the introduction of a new coinage (following the ejection of the Ptolemaic Greek occupation forces) that was minted with legends that used the old, pre-exilic Paleo-Hebrew or Phoenician style of writing. The dating of the scroll hinges on the way that the kaph letter is written—more closely resembling kaphs in Hasmonean coinage then in the Lachish ostraca (a collection of letters from around the year 590 BCE) which are our next most recent and extant exempla of the Paleo-Hebrew script.

It has sometimes been presumed that, "using the old script [on the coins] was a kind of nationalist affectation, to proclaim the ancestral, pre-Babylonian-exile, Israelite origins of the newly-independent Hasmonean state." Hasmonean coinage was introduced in 135 BCE with the ascent of John Hyrcanus to leadership and it seems to have been maintained until the beginning of the Herodean dynasty. Whether or not an alphabetic primer predating the new Hasmonean coinage might have been shared in common between the Paleo-Hebrew texts of the Qumran caves and the Hasmonean mints is not discussed in the scholarly monographs devoted to this subject. Thus, the literature leaves that question open.

The Talmud states that Samaritans used this script, and other fragments of Paleo-Hebrew fragments of the Torah tend to confirm that the version of the Torah being copied in Paleo-Hebrew was a Samaritan variant—at least a precursor to the Samaritan variant that became distinct at a later time. As such, it is possible that both the Hasmonean coinage and the Torah manuscripts may have been built up from a Samaritan style guide predating the coinage that comes into circulation under Hyrcanus but post-dating the Lachish ostraca.

== Discovery ==
The discovery of the first Dead Sea Scrolls in 1947 brought in its wake a flurry of epigraphic discoveries in the Qumran region. The Paleo-Hebrew Leviticus Scroll was one of the last among them to be discovered. It was found in January 1956 by local Bedouins of the Ta'amireh clan, in what is now known as "Qumran Cave 11", about 2 kilometres (1.2 mi) north of Khirbet Qumran, where it had been stashed along with other manuscripts. The entrance to the cave had been sealed off by fallen debris and large boulders, while part of the cave's roof had also collapsed, keeping the cave inaccessible for many centuries. The cache of manuscripts found in cave no. 11 yielded, among other manuscripts, the Great Psalms Scroll (11QPs), the Temple Scroll (11QT; being the longest of the Dead Sea Scrolls), and the Paleo-Hebrew Leviticus Scroll. The Leviticus Scroll was obtained by the Rockefeller Museum (formerly the Palestine Archaeological Museum) in May 1956 where it was kept in the museum's scrollery, and there remained largely untouched for 12 years, until it could be examined by researchers. When the museum came under the administration of the Israeli government after the Six-Day War in 1967, the museum assigned the Leviticus Scroll to D.N. Freedman for study and publication, who published the first report on the manuscript in 1974. Today, the 11QpaleoLev is held by the Israel Antiquities Authority (IAA).

The scroll was first photographed in 1956 by the Palestine Archaeological Museum (PAM), and again in 1970 under the auspices of the IAA, when infrared photographs were made of the manuscript. Between 1956 and 1970 the scroll had suffered, losing at several places tiny fragments from the edges. Thus, the 1956 photographs preserve a better stage of the scroll and show readings which were lost in 1970.

One fragment belonging to the 11QpaleoLev but not with the IAA is Fragment L (formerly, 11Q1), purchased by Georges Roux of France from the antiquities dealer Khalil Eskander Shaheen (Kando) of Bethlehem in 1967, showing Leviticus 21:7–12 / 22:21–27. Similar Paleo-Hebrew fragments exist for the Books of Genesis, Exodus, Numbers and Deuteronomy, discovered in Qumran Cave 4.

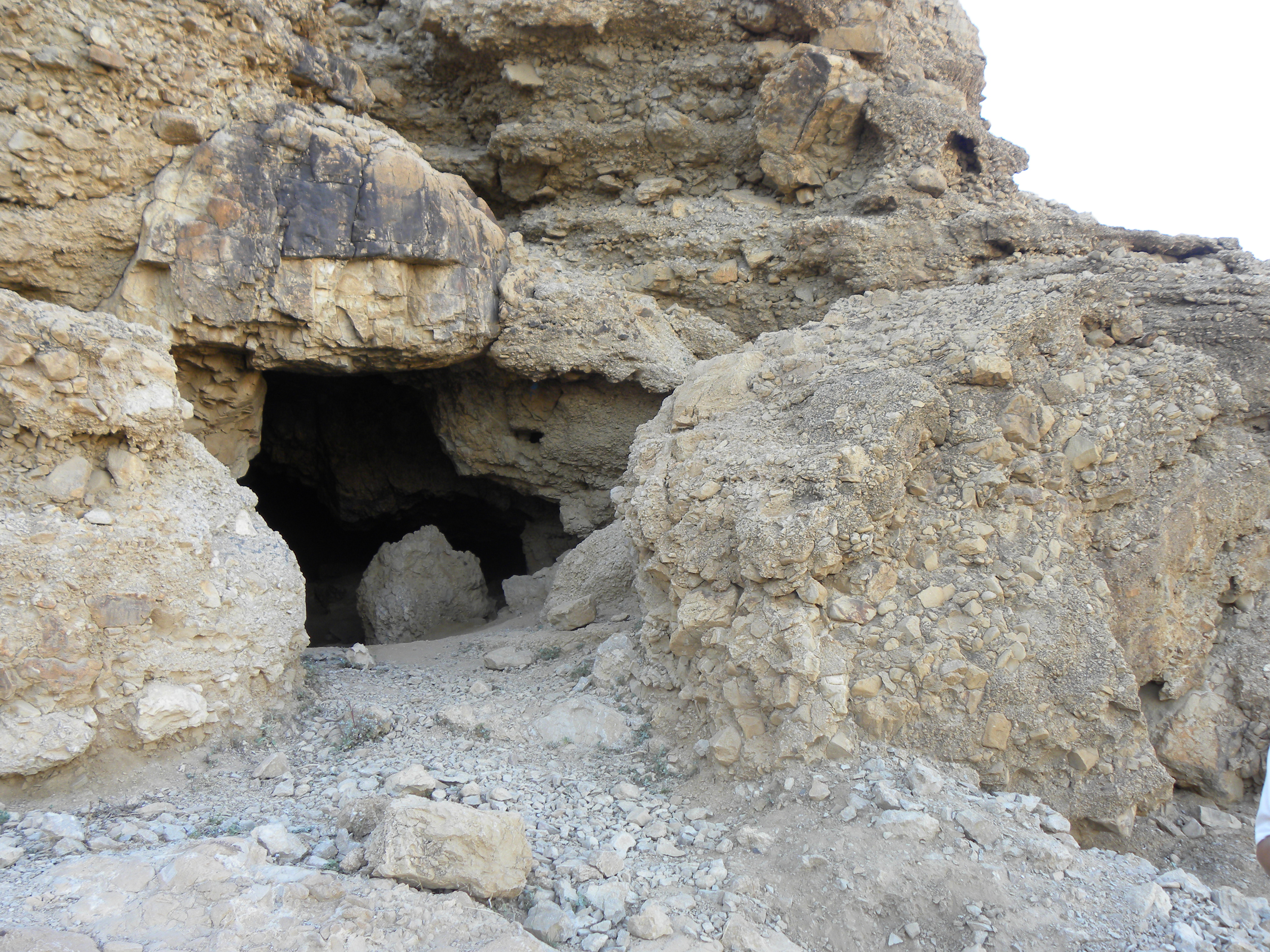
Qumran Cave 11 Entrance

=== Historical background ===
The Paleo-Hebrew script used is similar to the script still preserved today by the Samaritans, in the Samaritan Pentateuch, which itself is thought to be a direct descendant of the Paleo-Hebrew alphabet (known in other circles as the Phoenician alphabet).

The Leviticus Scroll is of primary importance in helping secular and religious scholars better understand the textual development of the Hebrew Bible and can shed light on the Hebrew Pentateuch's Urtext.

Although secular linguistic experts agree that the Ashurit script (i.e., the modern square Jewish Hebrew alphabet) evolved from the earlier Paleo-Hebrew script via the Aramaic alphabet—their secular consensus view is based on palaeographic evidentiary discoveries, the timelines and assigned eras of those discoveries, and the slowly evolving letter/character morphologies as they offshoot from earlier scripts—the question remains undecided among Jewish religious sages as to whether or not the discovery of the 11QpaleoLev scroll has implications on what the original script of the first Torah was.

Among some Jewish religious sages, the find of 11QpaleoLev would corroborate one rabbinic view that the Torah was originally written in the paleo-Hebrew script, which is one view found in Talmudic commentary. According to another rabbinic view in the 5th-century CE Babylonian Talmud, conversely, the find of 11QpaleoLev is inconsequential since they regard the Torah to have been given by Moses already in the "Assyrian script" (Ktav Ashuri, also known as "Ashurit"—the current modern printed Hebrew script), but then later changed to the Paleo-Hebrew script, and, once again, returned to the Ashurit script during the time of Ezra the Scribe in the 5th century BCE. This latter view, however, is incongruous with secular linguistic findings. Nevertheless, the matter remains undecided and in dispute among Jewish religious sages, with some holding the opinion that the Torah was originally inscribed in the Old Hebrew (Paleo-Hebrew) script, while others that it was not.

What is generally acknowledged by all Jewish religious sages is that Ezra the Scribe in the 5th century BCE was the first to enact that the scroll of the Law be written in the square script (Ashurit)—the modern Hebrew script, rather than in the Old Hebrew (Paleo-Hebrew) script used formerly, and permitted that the Book of Daniel be composed in the Aramaic language with Ashurit characters. The switch from the ancient Paleo-Hebrew script to the Ashurit script (modern Hebrew script), which happened after Israel's return from the Babylonian exile, officially did away with the ancient characters, but preserved the language intact, as the Paleo-Hebrew letters were replaced, letter by letter, with their exact Ashurit equivalent, and where the newer characters represented the same phonetic sounds used in the Old Hebrew script. Both old and new systems consisted of 22 corresponding characters with (at that time) the same Semitic sound values.

The Hebrew sages of the 1st-century CE augmented the use of the modern Hebrew script over that of the former script, declaring that sanctity only applied to those texts transcribed in the Ashurit (modern Hebrew) script, effectively doing away with the Old Hebrew (Paleo-Hebrew) writing system.

== Description ==
The Paleo-Hebrew Leviticus Scroll consists of fifteen fragments and one scroll of seven columns, measuring 100.5 centimetres (39.6 in) in length. The scroll is thought to have been originally part of a larger Torah scroll made-up of individual sheets of parchment that were sewn together. The surviving scroll, showing portions of the Book of Leviticus, shows only the bottom portion of two sheets of parchment (ca. one-fifth of its original height), now measuring 10.9 centimetres (4.3 in) in height. The two sheets of parchment are shown sewn together; one containing three columns, and the other four columns, for a total of seven extant columns. The Paleo-Hebrew script is written upon horizontal ruled lines, indented in the parchment by a semi-sharp instrument, from which the scribe "hangs" his letters. The rule lines were made mechanically and have a distinctive lighter shade of brown, and are intersected with indented vertical lines at the ends of the margins.

The parchment consists of light to dark brown, tanned leather, with the ancient Hebrew writing inscribed on the grain-side of the leather, being the side where the hair once grew, and which side is usually darker than the flesh side of the leather. The leather, upon examination, is thought to belong to a small domesticated animal; either a kid of the goats or young sheep. The pattern of the grain surface in the leather resembles that of a kid, rather than a sheep. The lettering of the scroll is written in lampblack ink. Individual words are divided by dots, just as in the Paleo-Hebrew Siloam inscription.

The top portion of the scroll is irregularly worn away, with no indication that it had been deliberately torn or cut. Letter and line calculations suggest that the scroll's height was roughly four times greater than the extant lower portion, based upon letter and scribal dot counts of columns four to six. The average number of letters per line is forty-seven. Columns 4 to 7 measure 14.9 cm. in width, except for the narrow, final column. Columns 2 and 3 measure 13.6 cm. and 12.0 cm., respectively.

The scroll contains much of Leviticus chapters 22:21–27, 23:22–29, 24:9–14, 25:28–36, 26:17–26, and 27:11–19, with smaller fragments showing portions of chapters 4:24–26, 10:4–7, 11:27–32, 13:3–9, 14:16–21, 18:26–19:3, 20:1–6, et al. Based on a cursory review and comparison of extant texts, the 11QpaleoLev Leviticus Scroll is considered by many to be a primary textual witness of the Proto-Masoretic Text.

As was apparently common for the time, the scribe who copied the Paleo-Hebrew Leviticus scroll has joined all words together, with only a dot separating word from word.

== Orthography ==
A comparative study made between the Masoretic Text (henceforth MT) and the Leviticus Scroll shows a tradition of orthography which slightly differed from the MT with respect to plene and defective scripta, the Leviticus Scroll generally showing more full spellings than the MT. This makes sense, since the Masoretic scholars are the ones who created the vowel pointing system that was added to the consonantal text, whereas the fuller spellings were the only available aid to the reader for discerning the vowel sounds at the earlier period. According to the Talmud, at some time during the Second Temple period the Sages saw a need to bring conformity to the writing, and therefore began work on establishing an authoritative text, which eventually became known as the MT.

Variant spellings
Source	Leviticus Scroll	Masoretic Text (MT)	Transliteration
Lev. 11:31	במותמ	במתם	(bĕmōtam)
Lev. 13:4	מראיה	מראה	(marʾehā)
Lev. 13:39	לב]נות	לבנת	(lĕbānōt)
Lev. 17:2	אלהמ	אליהם	(ʾălēhem)
Lev. 17:5	זב]היהמ	זבחיהם	(zibḥêhem)
Lev. 17:5	והביאומ	והביאם	(wehebîʾūm)
Lev. 13:4	מראיה	מראה	(marʾehā)
Lev. 18:27, 30	הת(ו)]עבות	התועבת	(hattôʿēbōt)
Lev. 18:29	התעבות	התועבות	(hattôʿēbôt)
Lev. 18:29	העשות	העשת	(hāʿōśōt)
Lev. 19:3	שבתותי	שבתתי	(šabbĕtōtay)
Lev. 20:4	יעלמו	יעלימו	(yaʿlimû)
Lev. 21:6	מקריבימ	מקריבם	(maqrîbīm)
Lev. 21:7; 24:9	קדוש	קדש	(qādōš)
Lev. 21:10	מאחו	מאחיו	(mēʾeḥāyw)
Lev. 21:11	נפשות	נפשת	(napšōt)
Lev. 21:11	יבוא	יבא	(yābōʾ)
Lev. 22:22	או ילפת או גרב או יבלת	או יבלת או גרב או ילפת	(reverse order)
Lev. 22:22	תקרבו	תקריבו	(taqrîbû)
Lev. 22:23	תעשו	תעשה	(taʿăśû)
Lev. 22:25	משחתימ המ	משחתם בהם	(mašḥatām behem)
Lev. 23:24, 27	השבעי	השביעי	(haššĕbîʿî)
Lev. 24:10	והאיש הישראלי	ואיש הישראלי	(weʾiš hayyiśrĕʾēlî)
Lev. 24:12	ויניחו אתו	ויניחהו	(wayannîḥû ʾôtō)
Lev. 24:14	הציאו	הוצא	(hôṣēʾ)
Lev. 25:28	ביובל	ביבל	(bayyōbēl)
Lev. 25:30	מלאות	מלאת	(mĕlōʾt)
Lev. 25:30	לו	אשר לא	(ʾašer lō)
Lev. 25:30	חומה	חמה	(ḥōmâ)
Lev. 25:30	לצמיתות	לצמיתת	(laṣṣĕmîtût)
Lev. 25:32	אזתמ	אחזתם	(ʾaḥuzzatām)
Lev. 25:34	מגש	מגרש	(migraš)
Lev. 26:5	איב	אויב	(ʾôyēb)
Lev. 26:18, 21	חטתיכמ	חטאתיכם	(ḥaṭṭoʾtêkem)
Lev. 26:19	ונתתי שמיכמ	ונתתי את שמיכם	(omission of the particle et)
Lev. 26:19	כנחה	כנחשה	(kannĕḥušâ)
Lev. 26:21	תבו	תאבו	(tōʾbû)
Lev. 26:22	ושלחתי	והשלחתי	(wĕhîšlaḥtî)
Lev. 26:24	והלכתי עמכמ בחמת ק[ר]י	והלכתי אף אני עמכם בקרי	(major differences)
Lev. 26:25	והביאתי	והבאתי	(wĕhēbēʾtî)
Lev. 27:13	יגאלנו	יגאלנה	(yigʾālennû)
Lev. 27:13	חמישיתו	חמישתו	(ḥămîšītô)
Lev. 27:14	יקדיש	יקדש	(yaqdīš)
Lev. 27:15	חמשית	חמישית	(ḥămîšît)
Lev. 27:18	ה]נתרות]	הנותרת	(hannôtārōt)

The 11QpaleoLev scroll is unique in that where the MT requires reading לו in Leviticus 25:30 as the ḳeri (קרי), although the text is written לא as the actual ketiv (כתיב) in the MT, the Paleo-Hebrew Leviticus Scroll shows the original reading and is written plainly as לו, without the necessity of changing its reading. This suggests that the Masoretes who transmitted the readings for words had access to an early orthographic tradition.

Another unique feature of the Paleo-Hebrew Leviticus Scroll is that it shows an ancient scribal practice of aligning all words in the columns in a natural progressive order, without the necessity of stretching words as is typically practised by scribes in the Ashurit script (modern Hebrew script) to justify the end of the line at the left margin. To avoid a long word extending beyond the column, the scribe simply broke-off the word, writing one or several letters of that word at the end of one line, and the remaining letters of the same word at the beginning of the next line (e.g. the Tetragrammaton in Lev. 24:9, the word ישראל in Lev. 24:10, the word אל in Lev. 24:11 - all in column no. 3; the word ארצכם in Lev. 26:19 in column no. 5, et al.)

In column no. 4 of the 11QpaleoLev scroll (the second line from the bottom) it shows no section break for Leviticus 25:35 (Hebrew: וכי ימוך אחיך ומטה ידו עמך), although in most MT readings the place is marked by a section break (Closed Section). This anomaly can be attributed to the fact that some of the Geonim were in dispute over whether or not the reading in Leviticus 25:35 was to be marked by a section break; some including there a section break and others omitting a section break, as disclosed by the medieval scribe Menahem Meiri in his Kiryat Sefer.

=== Partial translation of scroll ===
In the following nine lines, a translation of the Paleo-Hebrew Leviticus Scroll is rendered as follows:

Lev. 23:22-29 (contained in the second column). Words written here in brackets are based on the scrolls reconstruction, as they are missing in the original manuscript.

1. (22)[...edges of your field, or] gather [the gleanings of your harvest; you shall leave them for the poor and the stranger; I the LO]RD [am]
2. your God.
3. (23)The LORD spoke to Moses saying: (24)Speak to the Israelite people thus: In the seventh month
4. on the first day of the month, you shall observe complete rest, a sacred occasion commemorated with load blasts.
5. (25)You shall not work at your occupations; and you shall bring an offering by fire to the LORD.
6. (26)The LORD spoke to Moses saying: (27)Mark, the tenth day of this seventh month is the Day
7. of Atonement. It shall be a sacred occasion for you: you shall practice self-denial, and you shall bring an offering
8. by fire to the LORD; (28)you shall do no work throughout that day. For
9. [it is a Day of Atonement on which] expiation is made on your behalf [before the LO]RD your God. (29)Indeed, any person who...

The arrangement of the lines does not necessarily follow the arrangements used by modern scribes when copying from their Tikkun Soferim, a thing which does invalidate a Torah scroll. However, the use of section breaks follows closely the traditions bequeathed by the Masoretes, so that the Open section (Hebrew: פרשה פתוחה) in line no. 3 (Lev. 23:23) starts at the beginning of the margin, after the previous verse ended on the previous line, followed by a very long vacant space (vacat) extending to the left margin, showing that it is an Open Section, whereas line no. 6 (Lev. 23:26) is an anomaly of sorts, insofar that the MT makes it a Closed Section (Hebrew: פרשה סתומה), which should start in the middle of the column, with an intermediate space between it and the previous verse, but in the paleo-Hebrew Leviticus Scroll the section here starts at the beginning of the right margin, with the previous verse ending in the previous line and followed by a short vacant space extending to the left margin (which space is equivalent to that of about 14 letters).

Likewise, in column no. three, the verse Lev. 24:10 is made a Closed Section in the MT, but in the Paleo-Hebrew Leviticus Scroll the section break starts at the beginning of the right margin, preceded by a line where the previous verse ends close to the start of the line, and a solitary paleo-Hebrew letter waw is written in the middle of that long-extended space, a tradition which is no longer recognised today. In Leviticus 20:1–6 (Fragment J), the Open Section is preceded by a vacant space, in the middle of which the Hebrew character waw is written to also signify the first letter in the word וידבר in the new section. In these places and others, the solitary waw is characteristically used in open spaces between paragraphs when the new paragraph should have begun with that letter. The use of a solitary waw in the middle of the section break is consistent with the practice found in Paleo-Hebrew biblical manuscripts discovered in Qumran cave no. 4, showing fragments from the Book of Exodus, tentatively dated 100–25 BCE.

As was customary for ancient Torah scrolls, words were joined together without spacing, as is seen in the paleo-Hebrew Leviticus scroll. Some words are broken in two, between two consecutive lines. The original Paleo-Hebrew Leviticus scroll contained approximately 45 lines.

=== Paleo-Hebrew scroll vs. the parent text of the Septuagint ===
From this one surviving relic of Israel's distant past, it can be shown that the unknown vorlage, or parent text, used to produce the Greek Septuagint (LXX) was similar to the text of the Paleo-Hebrew Leviticus Scroll in some places, such as in Lev. 26:24, where it adds the words beḥamat ḳerī = "in rage of froward behaviour" – the words "in rage" not appearing in the MT. In yet other places (Lev. 25:31 and Lev. 23:23–24), the Paleo-Hebrew Leviticus Scroll follows more closely the MT than does the Septuagint.

== See also ==
- Paleo-Hebrew alphabet
- List of manuscripts from Qumran Cave 11

== Bibliography ==
- Danby, H., ed. (1933), The Mishnah, Oxford: Oxford University Press, ISBN 0-19-815402-X
- de Vaux, Roland (1973). Archaeology and the Dead Sea Scrolls. Oxford: OUP.
- Encyclopaedia Judaica, vol. 2, Jerusalem: Keter Publishing House, Ltd., 1971, s.v. Alphabet, Hebrew
- Fitzmyer, J. (2008). A Guide to the Dead Sea Scrolls and Related Literature. Grand Rapids, Mich.: William B. Eerdmans Publishing Co. ISBN 9780802862419.
- Freedman, D.N.; Mathews, K.A. (1985). The Paleo-Hebrew Leviticus Scroll (11QpaleoLev). Philadelphia: American Schools of Oriental Research. ISBN 0-89757-007-3.
- Freedman, D.N., ed. (1992), "Hebrew Scripts - Paleo-Hebrew Script", Anchor Bible Dictionary, vol. 3, New York: New York: Doubleday, p. 96, OCLC 681961851
- Hanson, R.S. (1964). "Palaeo-Heb. Scripts in the Hasmonean Age". BASOR. 175: 26–42.
- Kaltner, John; McKenzie, Steven L. (2002). Beyond Babel: A Handbook for Biblical Hebrew and Related Languages. Resources for biblical study, no. 42. Atlanta: Society of Biblical Literature. ISBN 1589830350. OCLC 1170351292.
- Kasher, M. (1978). Chumash Torah Shelemah - The Script of the Torah and its Characters -- The Torah in Ivri and Ashuri Scripts (in Hebrew). Vol. 29. Jerusalem: Beit Torah Shelemah. OCLC 66267807.
- Maimonides (1985), "Hil. Sefer Torah", Mishne Torah (in Hebrew), vol. 2, Kiryat-Ono: Mekhon mishnat ha-Rambam, OCLC 19158717, s.v. Hil. Sefer Torah 8:5
- Mathews, K.A. (1986). "The Leviticus Scroll (11QpaleoLev) and the Text of the Hebrew Bible". The Catholic Biblical Quarterly. 48 (2). Catholic Biblical Association: 171–207. JSTOR 43717168. (based on Thesis (Ph.D.)--University of Michigan, 1980)
- Mathews, K.A. (1987). "The Paleo-Hebrew Leviticus Scroll from Qumran". The Biblical Archaeologist. 50 (1). The University of Chicago Press (on behalf of The American Schools of Oriental Research): 45–54. doi:10.2307/3210082. JSTOR 3210082. S2CID 163697066.
- Meiri (1881). Kiryat Sefer (in Hebrew). Vol. 2. Izmir. (reprinted in Jerusalem 1969)
- Shapiro, Marc B. (1993). "Maimonides' Thirteen Principles: The Last Word in Jewish Theology?". The Torah U-Madda Journal. 4. Rabbi Isaac Elchanan Theological Seminary, an affiliate of Yeshiva University: 187–242. JSTOR 40914883.
- Siegel, Jonathan P. (1979). "The Evolution of Two Hebrew Scripts". Biblical Archaeology Review. 5 (3).
- Siegel, Jonathan P. (1984). The Scribes of Qumran: Studies in the Early History of Jewish Scribal Customs, with Special Reference to the Qumran Biblical Scrolls and to the Tannaitic Traditions of 'Massekheth Soferim'. Ann Arbor, Mich. OCLC 634620432.; reproduced from the author's thesis (Ph.D.), first submitted to the Department of Religion at Sir George Williams University, Montreal, Quebec 1971
- Skehan, P.W.; Ulrich, E.; Sanderson, J.E. (1992). Emanuel Tov (ed.). "Palaeo-Hebrew and Greek Biblical Manuscripts". Discoveries in the Judaean Desert. 9. Oxford: Clarendon Press: 53–130.
- Tigchelaar, Eibert J.C. (1997). "Some More Small "11Q1" Fragments". Revue de Qumrân. 18 (2 (70)): 325–330. JSTOR 24609075.
- Tov, Emanuel (2004). Scribal Practices and Approaches Reflected in the Texts Found in the Judean Desert. Leiden: Brill. ISBN 90-04-14001-8.
- Ulrich, Eugene, ed. (2010). The Biblical Qumran Scrolls (Transcriptions and Textual Variants) (in Hebrew). Leiden: Brill. pp. 112–137. ISBN 978-90-04-18038-3. (Transcriptions of the paleo-Hebrew Leviticus Scroll)
- Van de Water, Rick (2000). "Reconsidering Palaeographic and Radiocarbon Dating of the Dead Sea Scrolls". Revue de Qumran. 19 (fascicle 3) (75). Gabalda, in affiliation with the National Center for Scientific Research: 423–439. ISSN 0035-1725. JSTOR 24663113.
