= Qimron v. Shanks =

Qimron v. Shanks (2000) is a landmark ruling by the Israeli Supreme Court. The court ruled that an Israeli scholar had a copyright on his reconstruction of an important Dead Sea Scroll and that his right had been violated by an unauthorized early publication of his work.

== Background ==
The more than 800 scrolls, including the oldest known copies of Old Testament books, are thought to have been written between the 2nd century B.C. and A.D. 70 and were discovered in 1947 near the Dead Sea in caves at Qumran on the West Bank.

Thereafter they were held at a museum in East Jerusalem. In 1967, the museum came under Israeli control following the Six‐Day War between Israel, Egypt, Jordan and Syria. While this brought the work on the scrolls under the auspices of the Israeli Antiquities Authority, this did not otherwise affect the work of an international team of scholars who had been appointed in 1953/54 to transcribe, edit, and publish the fragments found in Cave 4 at Qumran. It did, however, lead to resentment from scholars outside the team who were denied any access to the unpublished scrolls.

== Ruling ==
It was the first in which copyright law had been applied in court to a reconstruction of an ancient document.
