= Psalms 152–155 =

Set of ancient texts

Psalms 152 to 155 are additional Psalms found in two Syriac biblical manuscripts and several manuscripts of Elijah of Anbar's "Book of Discipline", first identified by the orientalist librarian Giuseppe Simone Assemani in 1759. Together with Psalm 151 they are also called the Five Apocryphal Psalms of David or the "Five Syriac Psalms". In addition to Psalm 151, Psalms 154–155 were found in the Dead Sea Scrolls in 11QPs^{a}, although it is likely that all of 151–155 were composed in Hebrew.

== Psalms 152–155 ==
=== Psalm 152 ===
"Spoken by David when he was contending with the lion and the wolf which took a sheep from his flock." This text has survived only in Syriac although the original language may have been Hebrew. The text has six verses, the tone is non-rabbinical, and it was probably composed in Israel during the Hellenistic period (c. 323–31 BC).

=== Psalm 153 ===
"Spoken by David when returning thanks to God, who had delivered him from the lion and the wolf and he had slain both of them." This text has survived only in Syriac. Date and provenance are like Psalm 152. It is listed as the fifth of the apocryphal psalms by Wright.

=== Psalm 154 ===
This Psalm survived in Syriac biblical manuscripts and also was found in Hebrew, in the Dead Sea scroll 11QPs(a)154 (also known as 11Q5 – The Great Psalms Scroll), a first-century AD manuscript. It is listed as the second of the apocryphal psalms by Wright who calls it "The Prayer of Hezekiah when enemies surrounded him". Gurtner suggests that this psalm may have sectarian resonances: the "many ones" (154:1) and the "community" (154:4) may refer to the people and community at Qumran.

=== Psalm 155 ===
This psalm is extant in Syriac and was also found in the Dead Sea Scroll 11QPs(a)155 (also called 11Q5 – The Great Psalms Scroll), a first-century CE Hebrew manuscript. Because the psalm is a generic psalm of repentance it is not possible to suggest date and origin, save that its origin is clearly pre-Christian. The psalm has been compared to Psalms 22 and 51 as well as the Prayer of Manasseh.

== See also ==
- Biblical canon
