= 11Q13 =

One of the Dead Sea Scrolls

11Q13, also 11QMelch or the Melchizedek document, is a fragmentary manuscript among the Dead Sea Scrolls (from Cave 11) which mentions Melchizedek as leader of God's angels in a war in Heaven against the angels of darkness instead of the more familiar Archangel Michael. The text is an apocalyptic commentary on the Jubilee year of Leviticus 25. The Dead Sea Scrolls contain texts in Hebrew, Aramaic and Greek; the language of 11Q13 is Hebrew. The date of composition is circa 100 BC.

== "Elohim" ==
In the fragmentary passage the term "Elohim" appears a dozen times, mainly referring to the God of Israel, but in commentary on "who says to Zion "Your Elohim reigns" (Isa. 52;7) 11Q13 states that Zion is the congregation of all the sons of righteousness, while Melchizedek is "Your Elohim" who will deliver the sons of righteousness from Belial.

== Content ==
11QMelch II... And concerning that which He said, In [this] year of Jubilee [each of you shall return to his property (Lev. xxv, 13); and likewise, And this is the manner of release:] every creditor shall release that which he has lent [to his neighbour. He shall not exact it of his neighbour and his brother], for God's release [has been proclaimed] (Deut. xv, 2). [And it will be proclaimed at] the end of days concerning the captives as [He said, To proclaim liberty to the captives (Isa. lxi, 1). Its interpretation is that He] will assign them to the Sons of Heaven and to the inheritance of Melchizedek; f[or He will cast] their [lot] amid the portions of Melchize]dek, who will return them there and will proclaim to them liberty, forgiving them [the wrong-doings] of all their iniquities. And this thing will [occur] in the first week of the Jubilee that follows the nine Jubilees. And the Day of Atonement is the e[nd of the] tenth [Ju]bilee, when all the Sons of [Light] and the men of the lot of Mel[chi]zedek will be atoned for. [And] a statute concerns them [to prov]ide them with their rewards. For this is the moment of the Year of Grace for Melchizedek. [And h]e will, by his strength, judge the holy ones of God, executing judgement as it is written concerning him in the Songs of David, who said, ELOHIM has taken his place in the divine council; in the midst of the gods he holds judgement (Psalms lxxxii, 1). And it was concerning him that he said, (Let the assembly of the peoples) return to the height above them; EL (god) will judge the peoples (Psalms vii, 7-8). As for that which he s[aid, How long will you] judge unjustly and show partiality to the wicked? Selah (Psalms lxxxii, 2), its interpretation concerns Belial and the spirits of his lot [who] rebelled by turning away from the precepts of God to ... And Melchizedek will avenge the vengeance of the judgements of God... and he will drag [them from the hand of] Belial and from the hand of all the sp[irits of] his [lot].And all the 'gods [of Justice'] will come to his aid [to] attend to the de[struction] of Belial. And the height is ... all the sons of God... this ... This is the day of [Peace/Salvation] concerning which [God] spoke [through Isa]iah the prophet, who said, [How] beautiful upon the mountains are the feet of the messenger who proclaims peace, who brings good news, who proclaims salvation, who says to Zion: Your ELOHIM [reigns] (Isa. lii, 7). Its interpretation; the mountains are the prophets... and the messenger is the Anointed one of the spirit, concerning whom Dan[iel] said, [Until an anointed one, a prince (Dan. ix, 25)] ... [And he who brings] good [news], who proclaims [salvation]: it is concerning him that it is written... [To comfort all who mourn, to grant to those who mourn in Zion] (Isa. lxi, 2-3). To comfort [those who mourn: its interpretation], to make them understand all the ages of t[ime] ... In truth ... will turn away from Belial... by the judgement[s] of God, as it is written concerning him, [who says to Zion]; your ELOHIM reigns. Zion is ..., those who uphold the Covenant, who turn from walking [in] the way of the people. And your ELOHIM is [Melchizedek, who will save them from] the hand of Belial. As for that which He said, Then you shall send abroad the trump[et in] all the land (Lev. xxv, 9) ...
