= War in Heaven =

Conflict between Lucifer and Michael in the New Testament

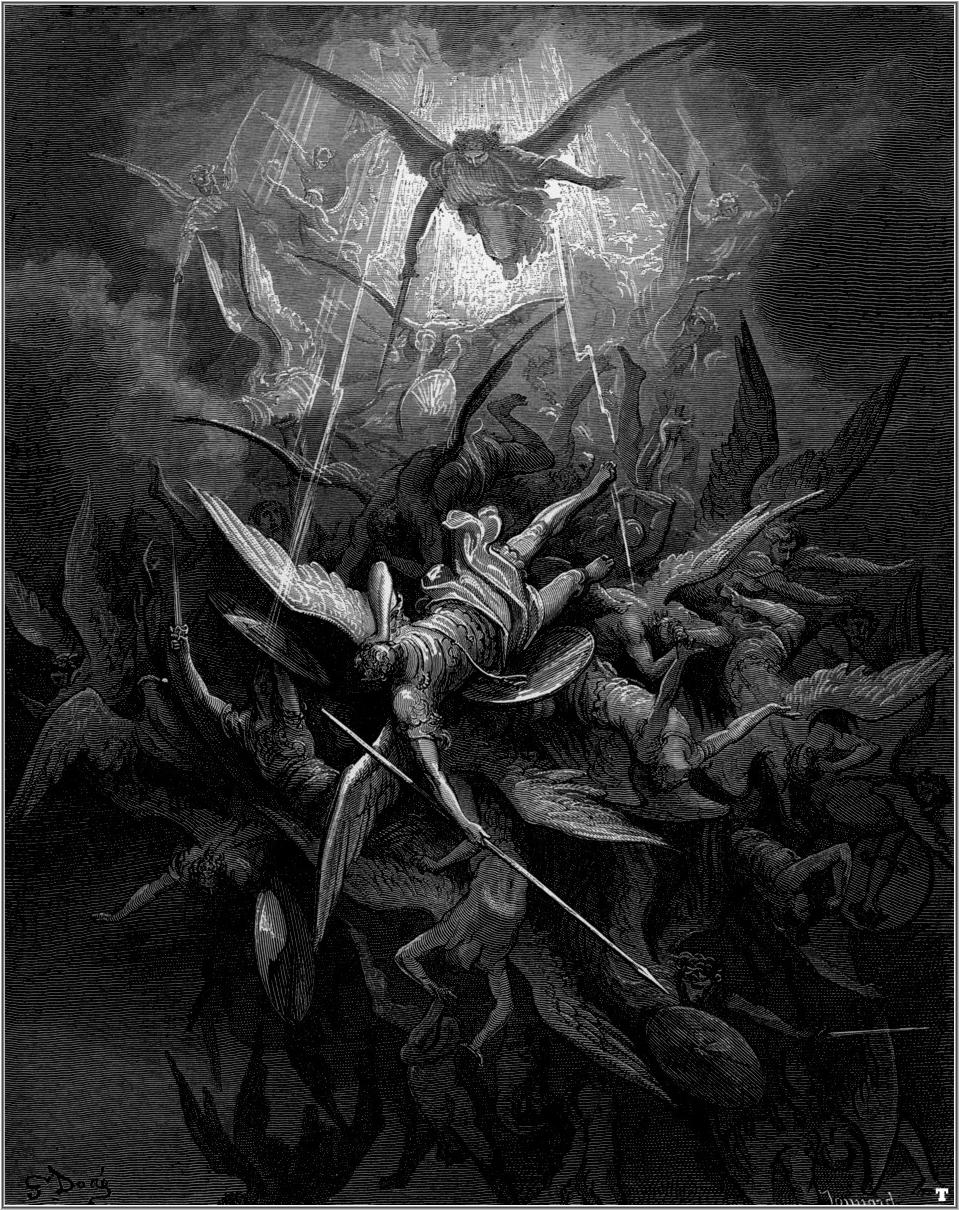
The Son casts the rebels out of Heaven. 1866 Illustration by Gustave Doré for John Milton's Paradise Lost.

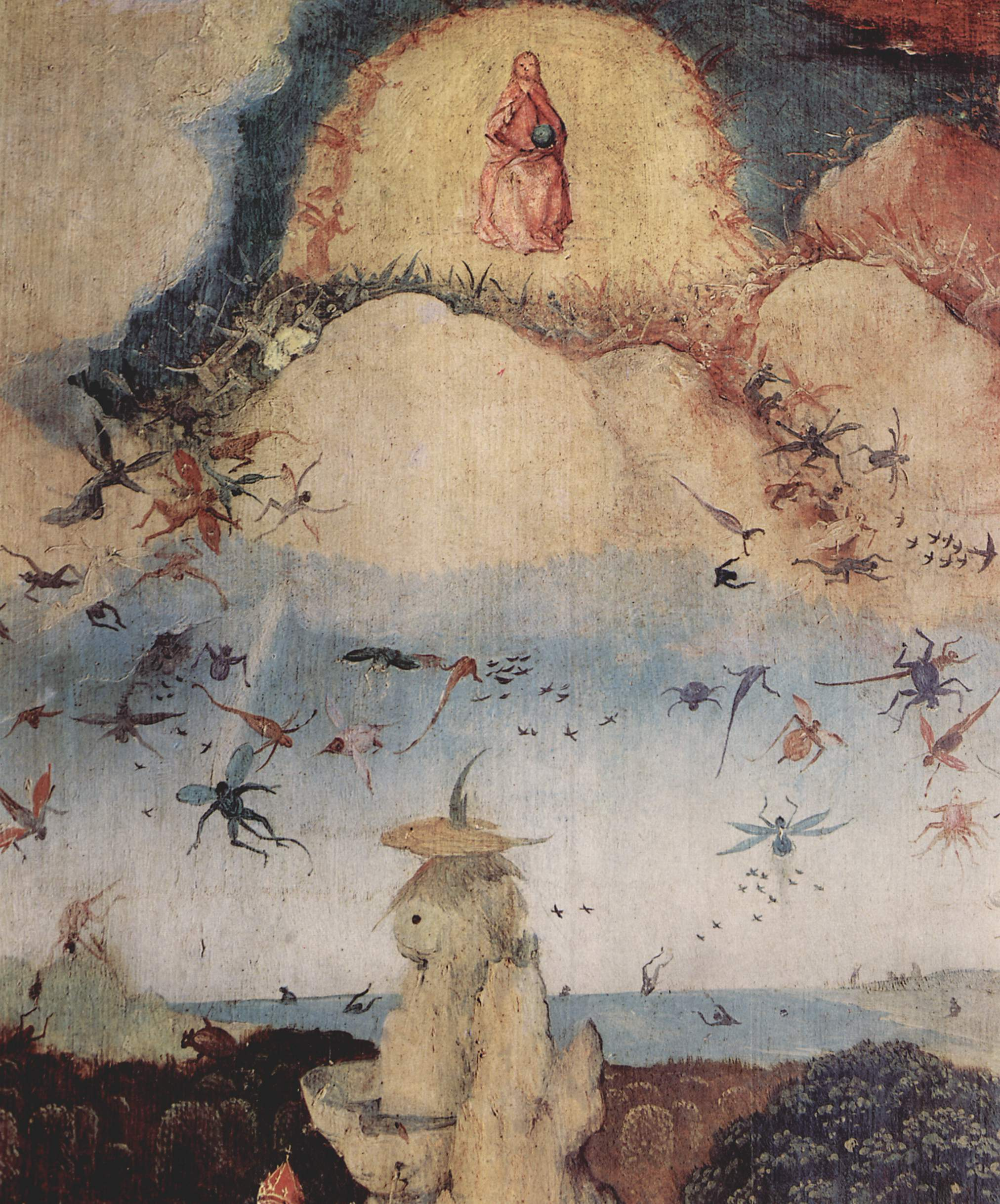
The Fall of the Rebel Angels; left hand panel of Hieronymus Bosch's The Haywain Triptych, c. 1500

The War in Heaven is a mythic conflict between supernatural forces in traditional Christian cosmology, attested in the Book of Revelation alongside proposed parallels in the Hebrew Bible and the Dead Sea Scrolls. It is described as the result of Satan, who is often identified as the angel Lucifer, rebelling against God and leading to a war between his followers and those still loyal to God, led by the Archangel Michael. Within the New Testament, the War in Heaven provides basis for the concept of the fallen angels and for Satan's banishment to Hell. The War is frequently featured in works of Christian art, such as John Milton's epic poem Paradise Lost, which describes it as occurring over the course of three days as a result of God the Father announcing Jesus Christ as his Son.

== Revelation 12:7–10 ==
The War in Heaven is attested to only in the Book of Revelation:

Then war broke out in heaven. Michael and his angels fought against the dragon, and the dragon and his angels fought back. But he was not strong enough, and they lost their place in heaven. The great dragon was hurled down—that ancient serpent called the devil, or Satan, who leads the whole world astray. He was hurled to the earth, and his angels with him.

— Revelation 12:7–10 (NIV)

== Interpretations ==
The Christian tradition has stories about angelic beings cast down from heaven by God, often presenting the punishment as inflicted in particular on Satan. As a result of linking this motif with the cited passage of the Book of Revelation, the casting of Satan down from heaven, which other versions of the motif present as an action of God himself, has become attributed to the archangel Michael at the conclusion of a war between two groups of angels, of whom (because of the mention of the dragon's tail casting a third of the stars of heaven to the earth) one third are supposed to have been on the side of Satan, in spite of the fact that the casting down of the stars (Revelation 12:4) is recounted as occurring before the start of the "war in heaven" (Revelation 12:7).

Commentators have attributed Satan's rebellion to a number of motives, all of which stem from his great pride. These motives include:

- a refusal to bow down to mankind on the occasion of the creation of man—as in the Armenian, Georgian, and Latin versions of the Life of Adam and Eve. Islamic tradition holds a similar view: Iblis refuses to bow down to Adam.
- the culmination of a gradual distancing from God through rebellion (an idea of Origen of Alexandria).
- a declaration by God that all were to be subject to his Son, the Messiah (as in Milton's Paradise Lost).

Jonathan Edwards states in his sermon Wisdom Displayed in Salvation:

Satan and his angels rebelled against God in heaven, and proudly presumed to try their strength with his. And when God, by his almighty power, overcame the strength of Satan, and sent him like lightning from heaven to hell with all his army; Satan still hoped to get the victory by subtlety[.]

In the Catholic Encyclopedia (1911) article "St. Michael the Archangel", Frederick Holweck wrote: "St. John speaks of the great conflict at the end of time, which reflects also the battle in heaven at the beginning of time." He added that Michael's name "was the war-cry of the good angels in the battle fought in heaven against the enemy and his followers".

Several modern Bible-commentators view the "war in heaven" in Revelation 12:7–13 as an eschatological vision of the end of time or as a reference to spiritual warfare within the church, rather than (as in Milton's Paradise Lost) "the story of the origin of Satan/Lucifer as an angel who rebelled against God in primeval times". Some commentators have seen the war in heaven as "not literal" but symbolic of events on earth.

=== The Church of Jesus Christ of Latter-day Saints ===
The Church of Jesus Christ of Latter-day Saints (LDS Church) teaches that Revelation 12 concerns an actual event in the pre-mortal existence of man. The Book of Moses, included in the LDS standard works canon, references the war in heaven and Satan's origin as a fallen angel of light. The concept of a war in heaven at the end of time became an addendum to the story of Satan's fall at the genesis of time—a narrative which included Satan and a third of all of heaven's angels. Evidence for this interpretation comes from the phrase "the devil and his angels"; this specific phrasing became paramount to the reinforcement of the notion that people associated angels with the devil preceding the writing of Revelation.

The LDS Church believes that the war in heaven started in the premortal existence when Heavenly Father (Elohim) created the Plan of salvation to enable humanity to become like him. Jesus Christ as per the plan was the Savior and those who followed the plan would come to Earth to experience mortality and progress toward eternal life. Lucifer, another spirit son of God, rebelled against the plan's reliance on agency and proposed an altered plan that negated agency. Thus he became Satan, and he and his followers were cast out of heaven. This denied them participating in God's plan, the privileges of receiving a physical body, and experiencing mortality.

=== Seventh-day Adventists ===
In Seventh-day Adventist theology, the Great Controversy theme refers to the cosmic battle between Jesus Christ and Satan, also played out on earth. One of the 28 fundamental beliefs (the eighth, the 'Great Controversy') of Seventh-day Adventists states:

All humanity is now involved in a great controversy between Christ and Satan regarding the character of God, His law, and His sovereignty over the universe. This conflict originated in heaven when a created being, endowed with freedom of choice, in self-exaltation became Satan, God's adversary. He led into rebellion a portion of the angels. He introduced the spirit of rebellion into this world when he led Adam and Eve into sin. This human sin resulted in the distortion of the image of God in humanity, the disordering of the created world, and its eventual devastation at the time of the worldwide flood. Observed by the whole creation, this world became the arena of the universal conflict, out of which the God of love will ultimately be vindicated. To assist His people in this controversy, Christ sends the Holy Spirit and the loyal angels to guide, protect, and sustain them in the way of salvation. (Rev. 12:4-9; Isa. 14:12-14; Eze. 28:12-18; Gen. 3; Rom. 1:19-32; 5:12-21; 8:19-22; Gen. 6-8; 2 Peter 3:6; 1 Cor. 4:9; Heb. 1:14.)

The chief proponent of the "war in heaven" among SDAs was Ellen G. White, who expanded the concept in her book, Great Controversy between Christ and Satan (1884), where she reinterprets and extends Milton's portrayal in Paradise Lost as a metaphor for religious conflict throughout the Christian age.

== Bible parallels ==
Parallels are drawn to the passage in Isaiah 14:4–17, which mentions the "son of the morning" who had "fallen from heaven" and was "cast down to the earth". In verse 12 of this passage, the Hebrew word that referred to the morning star was translated into Latin as lucifer. With the application to the Devil of the morning-star story, "Lucifer" was then popularly applied to him as a proper name. The term lucifer, the Latin name (literally 'Light-Bearer' or 'Light-Bringer') for the morning star (the planet Venus in its morning appearances), is often given to the Devil in popular stories. The brilliancy of the morning star—which appears brighter than all other stars, but is not seen during the night proper—may have given rise to myths such as the Babylonian story of Ethana and Zu, who was led by his pride to strive for the highest seat among the star-gods on the northern mountain of the gods (an image present also in Ezekiel 28:14), but was hurled down by the supreme ruler of the Babylonian Olympus. Stars were then regarded as living celestial beings.

The Jewish Encyclopedia states that the myth concerning the morning star was transferred to Satan by the first century before the Common Era, citing in support of this view the Life of Adam and Eve and the Slavonic Book of Enoch 29:4, 31:4, where Satan-Sataniel is described as having been one of the archangels. Because he contrived "to make his throne higher than the clouds over the earth and resemble 'My power' on high", Satan-Sataniel was hurled down, with his angels, and since then he has been flying in the air continually above the abyss. According to Jewish thought, the passage in Isaiah was used to prophesy the fate of the King of Babylon, who is described as aiming to rival God.

== Dead Sea Scrolls ==
Some scholars discern the concept of a war in heaven in certain Dead Sea Scrolls: namely, the War of the Sons of Light Against the Sons of Darkness (also known as the War Scroll; 1QM and 4Q491–497), Song 5 of the Songs of the Sabbath Sacrifice (4Q402), and the Melchizedek document (11Q13).

In the War Scroll, according to Menahem Mansoor, the angels of light, who are identified with Michael, the prince of light, will fight in heaven against the angels of darkness, who are identified with Belial, while the Sons of Light fight the Sons of Darkness on earth, and during the last of the seven battles described in the scroll will come and help the Sons of Light win the final victory.

James R. Davila speaks of Song 5 of the Songs of the Sabbath Sacrifice as describing "an eschatological war in heaven similar to that found in 11Q13 and to traditions about the archangel Michael in the War Rule and the Book of Revelation". He suggests that Melchizedek, who is mentioned both in the Melchizedek document and the fifth song of the Songs of the Sabbath Sacrifice, may be a divine warrior who is involved in the conflict with the archangel Michael in the futurist sense.

However, that the Melchizedek document (11Q13) concerns a war in heaven is denied by Fred L. Horton, who remarks that "there is no hint in the extant portion of the 11Q Melchizedek of a revolt of heavenly beings against the heavenly council, and the only dissenting spirit is the traditional Belial"; the view of Davila, however, is that the document originally was about an eschatological war in heaven, with Melchizedek as angelic high priest and military redeemer.

== Depiction ==
The motif of the fall of Satan and his angels can be found in Christian angelology and Christian art, and the concept of fallen angels (who, for rebelling against God, were downgraded and condemned to being earthbound) is widespread.

=== Literature ===
Anatole France in the 1914 novel La Révolte des Anges adapted the Christian references to make a parable about revolts and revolutionary movements.

In Milton's Paradise Lost (1674), the angel Lucifer leads a rebellion against God before the Fall of Man, refusing to bow down to the Son of God. He flees northward in Heaven, attempting to build his own palace and challenge the Father. A terrible battle ensues. Initially, Michael and Lucifer fight on the first day. This contest ends in the retreat of the rebellious angels. On the second day, the rebels use cannon and other engines of war against the angels, gaining an initial victory. However, the heavenly forces respond by casting hills on the rebels. On the third day, God sends His own Son Messiah to defeat the angels and cast them into the abyss. A third of the angels, including pagan gods such as Moloch and Belial, are hurled by God from Heaven.

=== Art ===
The subject of the War in Heaven has been depicted by many noted artists, both in paintings and in sculptures, including works by Pieter Paul Rubens, Guido Reni and Jacob Epstein.

War in Heaven

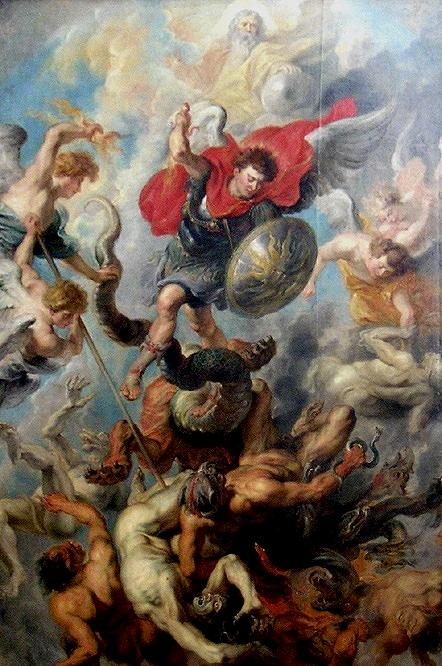
War in Heaven by Pieter Paul Rubens, 1619

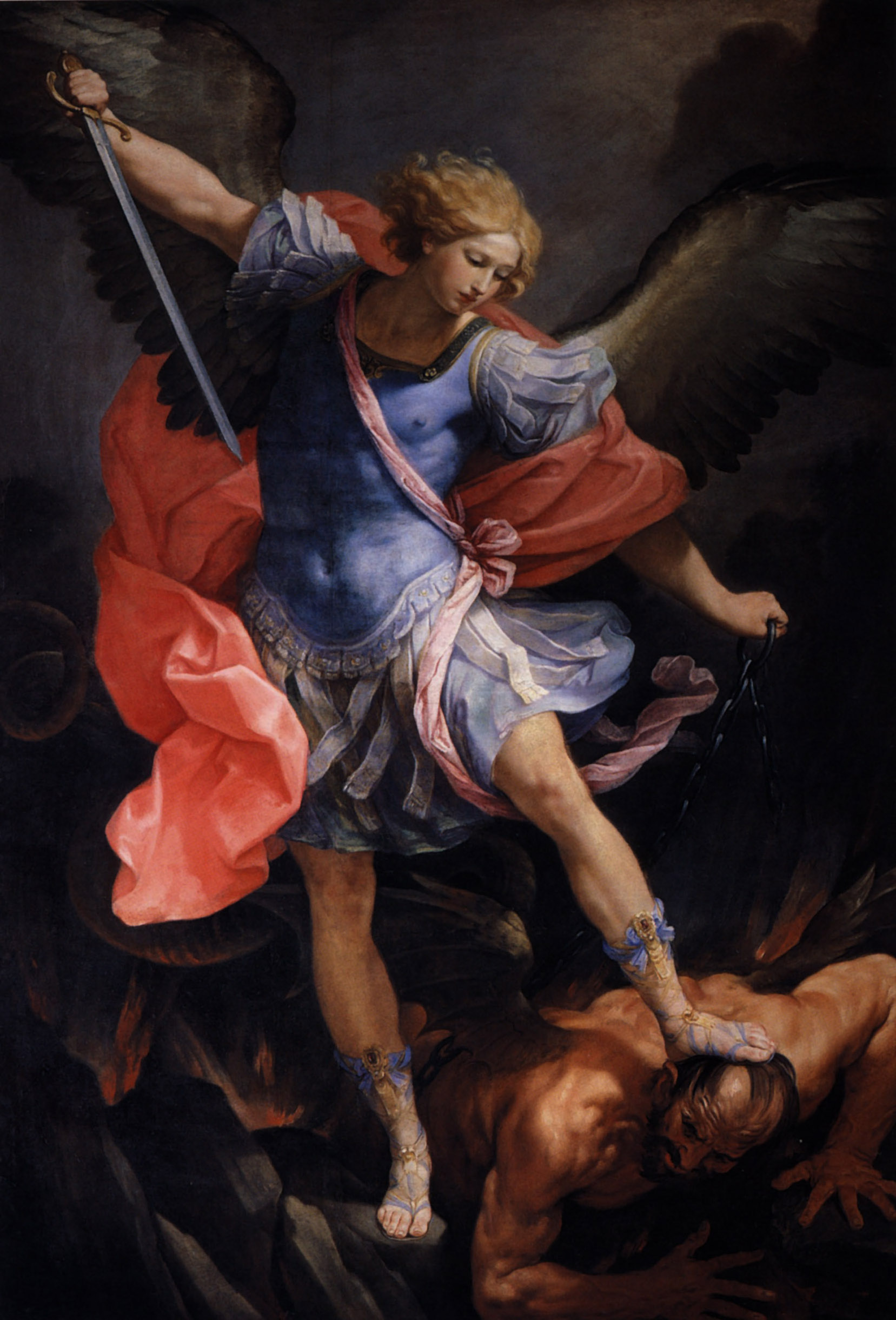
Michael and Satan, by Guido Reni, c. 1636

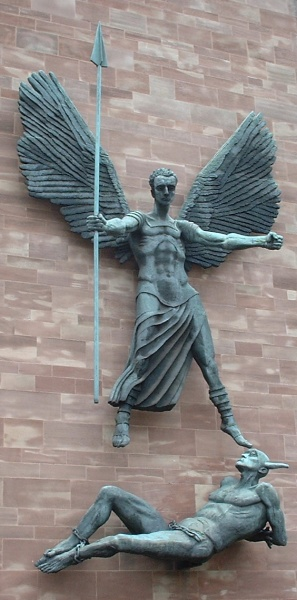
St Michael's Victory over the Devil, by Jacob Epstein at Coventry Cathedral

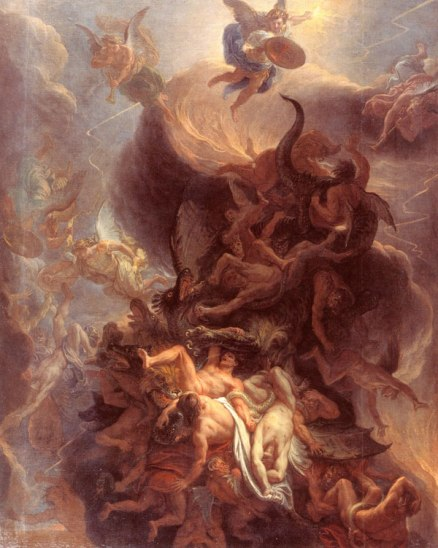
The fall of the rebel angels, by Charles Le Brun, after 1680

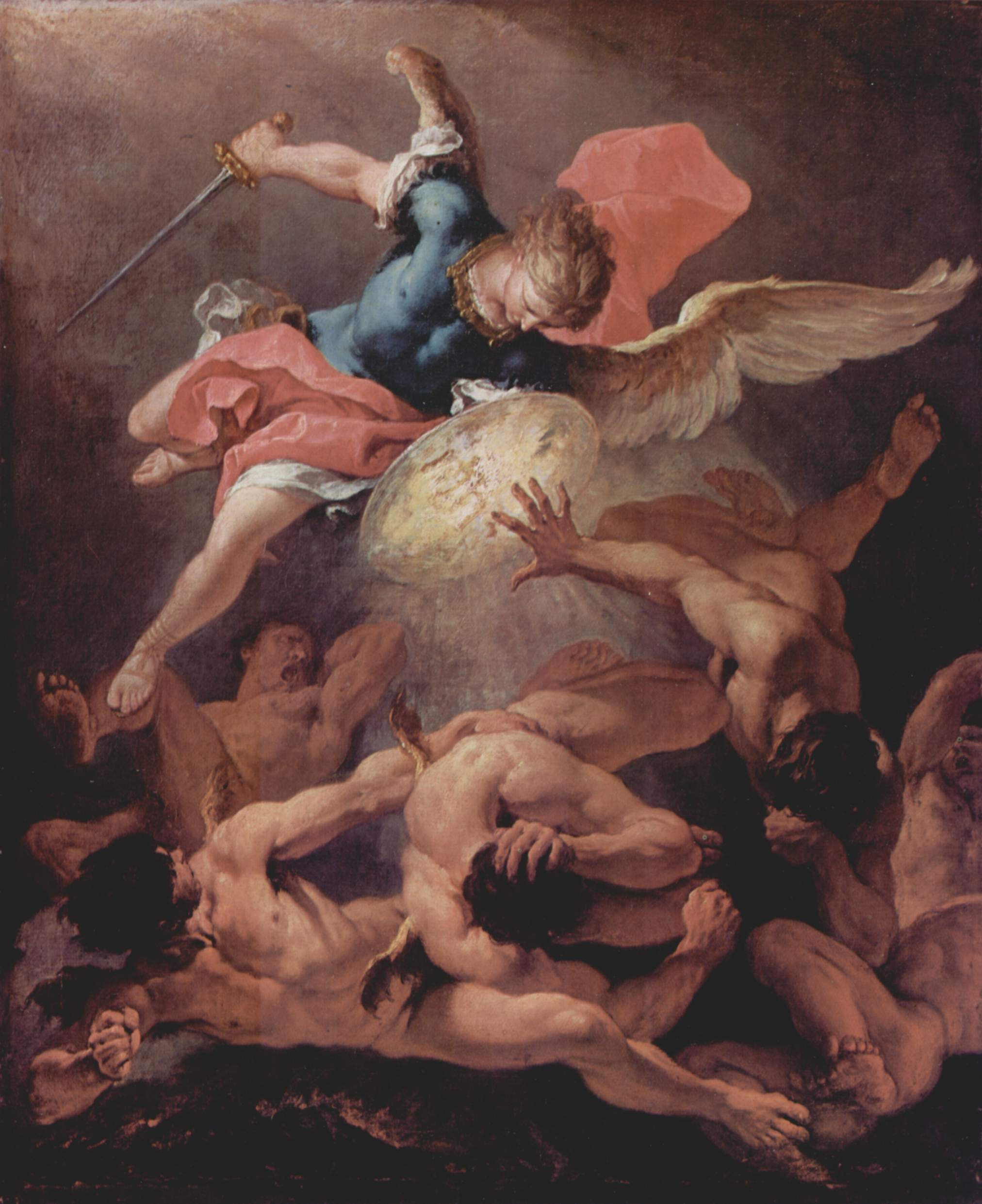
Michael battles the rebel angels, by Sebastiano Ricci, c. 1720

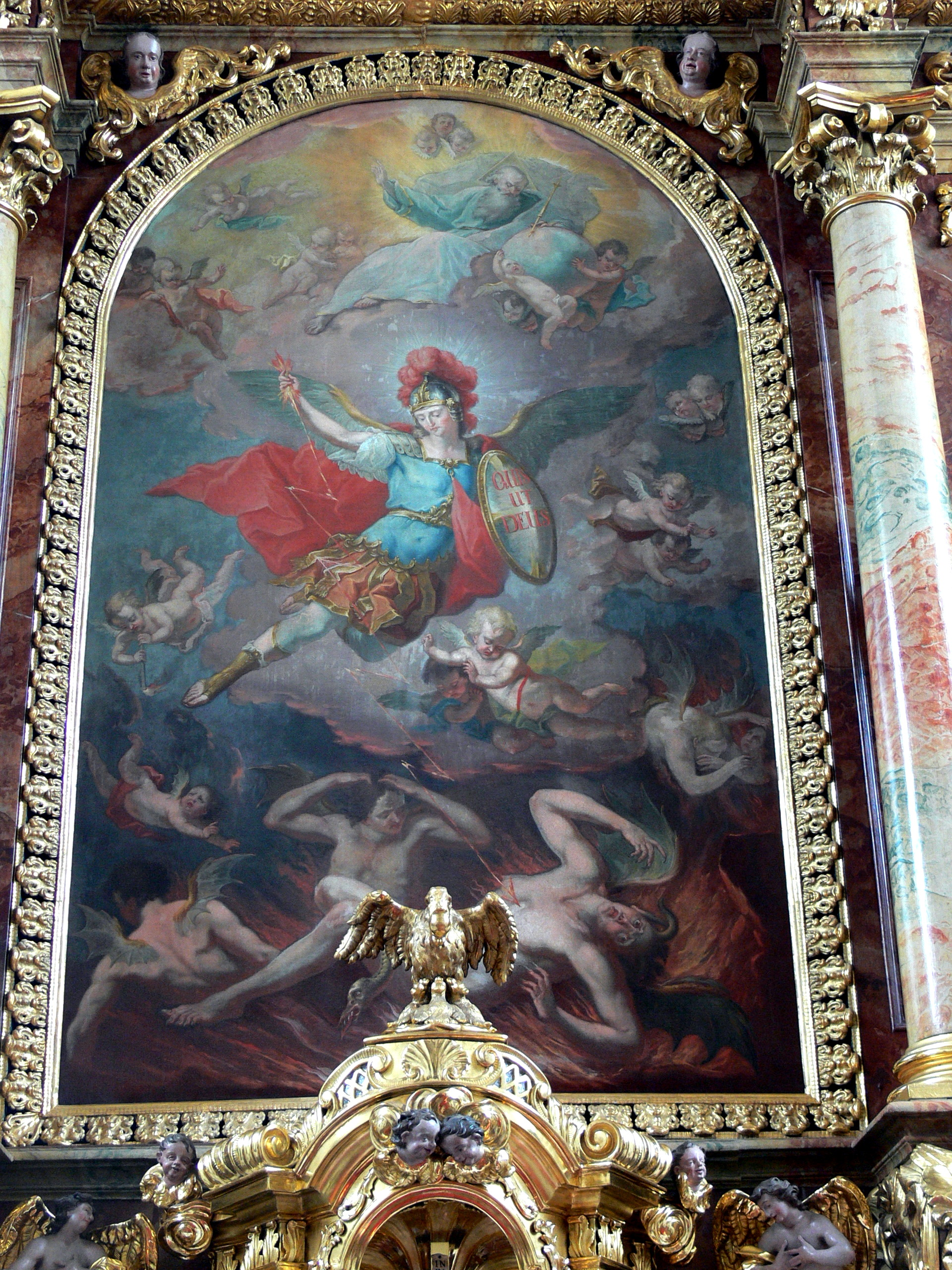
Michael battles the rebel angels, by Johann Georg Unruhe 1793

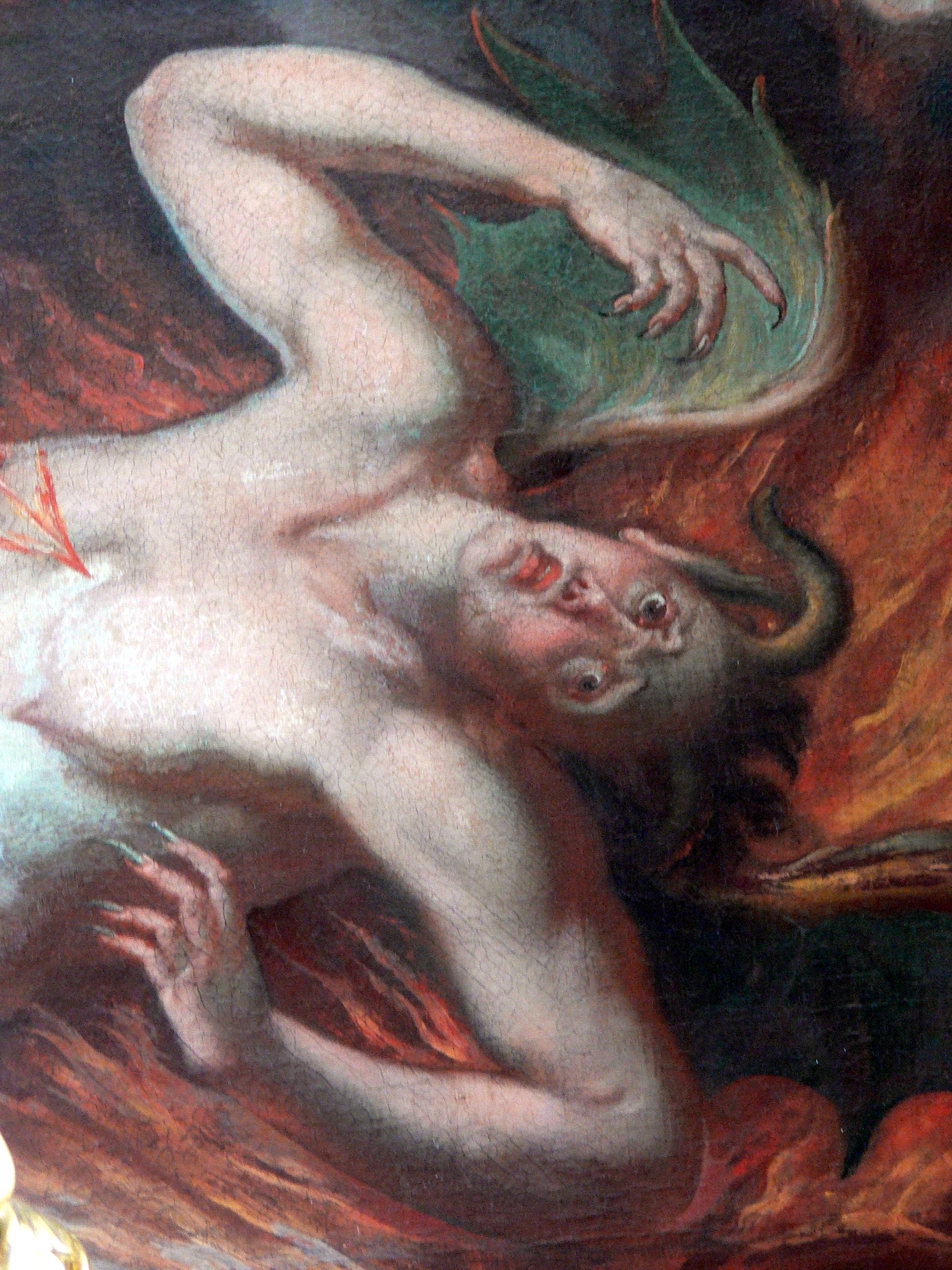
Detail, Georg Unruhe

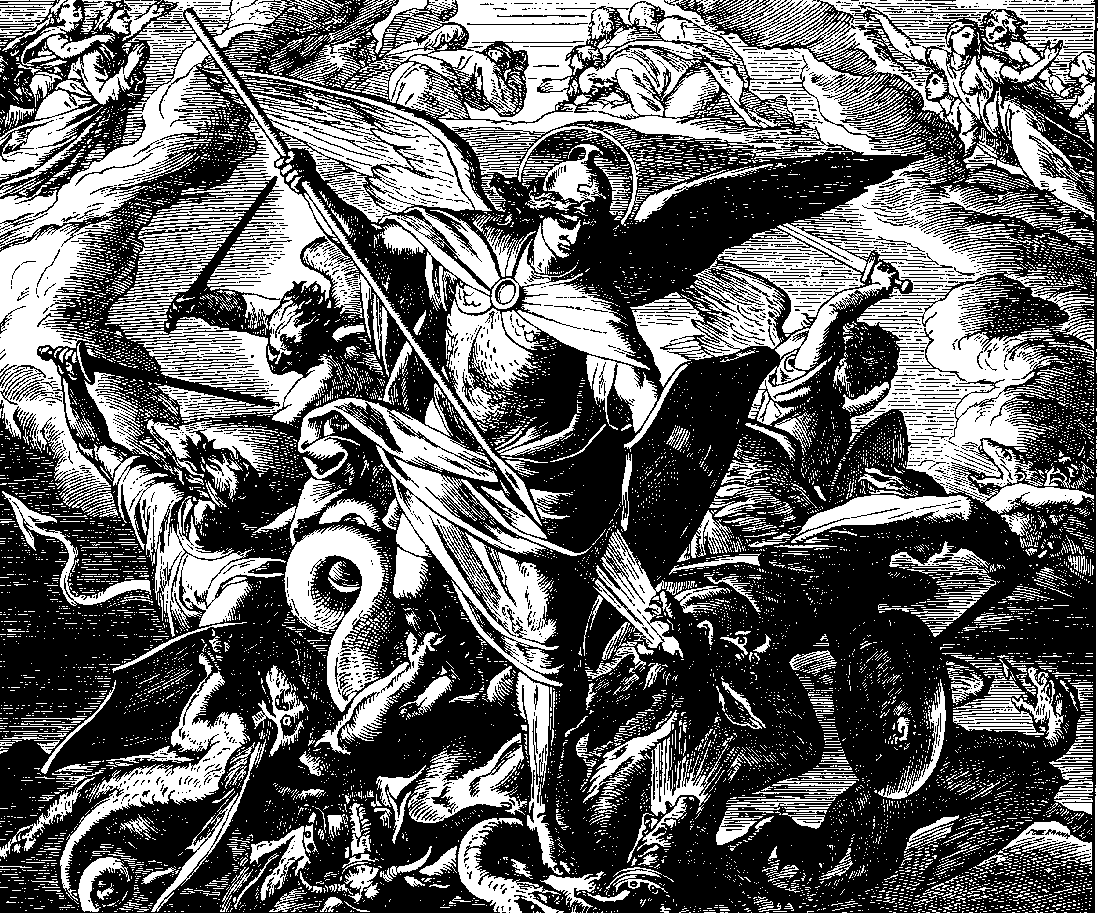
Michael and the Dragon. Die Bibel in Bildern (Revelation) engraving by Julius Schnorr von Carolsfeld, 1860.

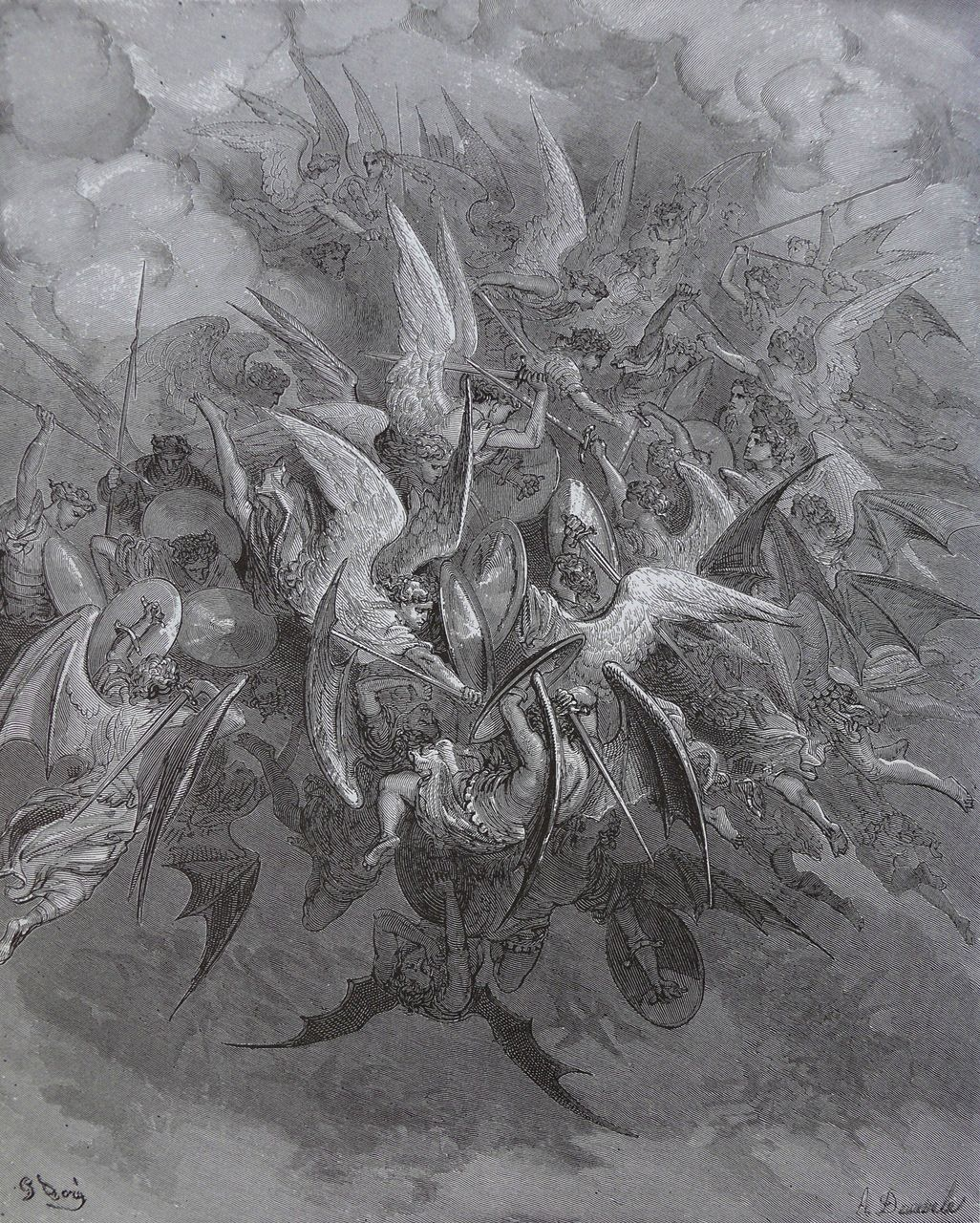
1866 Gustave Doré illustration for Paradise Lost, depicting a melee between the angels.

=== Music ===
A choral antiphon for the feast of Michaelmas, Factum est Silentium, paraphrases the events described in Revelation 8:1 and Revelation 12:7–12:

Latin

Factum est silentium in caelo,
Dum committeret bellum draco cum Michaele Archangelo.
Audita est vox millia millium dicentium:
Salus, honor et virtus omnipotenti Deo.
Millia millium minestrabant ei et decies centena millia assistebant ei.
Alleluia.
Dum draco committeret bellum et Michael pugnavit cum eo et fecit victoriam.

Translation:
English

There was silence in heaven
When the dragon fought with the Archangel Michael.
The voice of a thousand thousand was heard saying:
Salvation, honour and power be to almighty God.
A thousand thousand ministered to him and ten hundreds of thousands stood before him.
Alleluia.
For a serpent was waging war; and Michael fought with him and emerged victorious.

The antiphon has been set as a choral motet by a number of composers including Felice Anerio, Richard Dering, Melchior Franck, Alessandro Grandi and Costanzo Porta. A hymn written by the German poet and hymnodist Friedrich Spee in 1621, Unüberwindlich starker Held ("Invincible strong hero"), also makes reference to the Archangel Michael overcoming the dragon. Bach's cantata Es erhub sich ein Streit, BWV 19 is on this subject.

=== Other ===
Other pieces of media to have referenced the War in Heaven, either as direct depictions or textual allusions, include Warhammer 40K, Babylon 5 and the Doom series. The War in Heaven is a 1999 Christian-themed Doom clone developed by Eternal Warriors and published by ValuSoft.

== See also ==
- Æsir–Vanir War
- Asura
- Devas
- Gigantomachy
- Theomachy
- Titanomachy
- War between angels and jinn
