= Qumran Caves =

Caves in the West Bank

Coordinates: 31°44′31″N 35°27′31″E

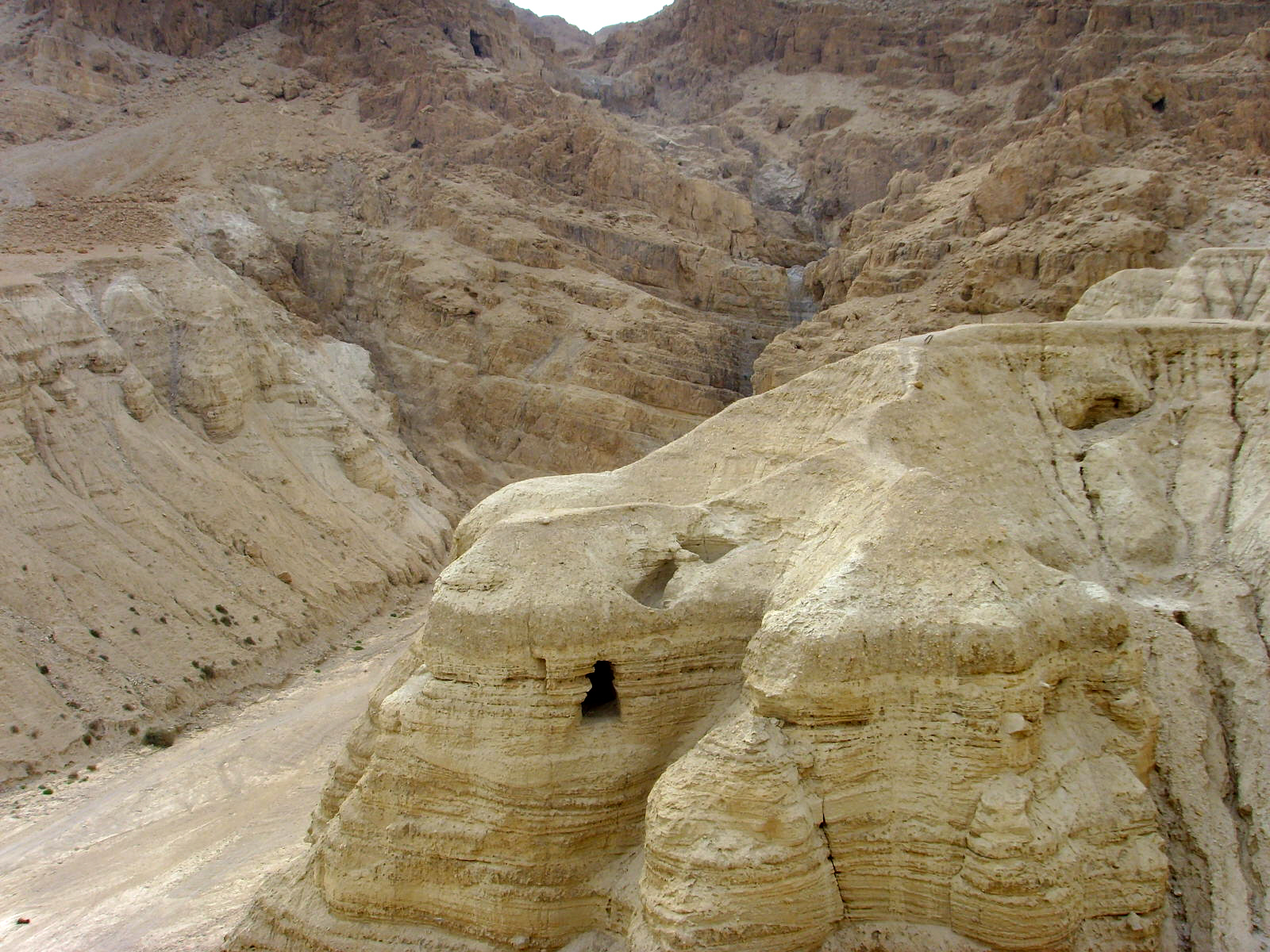
Cave 4Q with other caves in the background

The Qumran Caves (Arabic: كهوف قمران Kuhūf Qumrān; Hebrew: מערות קומראן HaMeara Kumran) are a series of caves, both natural and artificial, found around the archaeological site of Qumran in the Judaean Desert. It is in these caves that the Dead Sea Scrolls were discovered.

Israel Nature and Parks Authority took over the site following the end of the 1967 war, when Israel occupied the West Bank and seized Qumran. Israel has since invested heavily in the area to establish the Qumran caves as a site of "uniquely Israeli Jewish heritage". The caves are recognized in Israel as a National Heritage Site, despite the caves being in occupied Palestinian territories; as such, the designation has drawn criticism.

== History ==
The limestone cliffs above Qumran contain numerous caves that have been used over the millennia: the first traces of occupation are from the Chalcolithic period then onward to the Arab period. The artificial caves relate to the period of the settlement at Qumran and were cut into the marl bluffs of the terrace on which Qumran sits.

== Dead Sea Scrolls ==
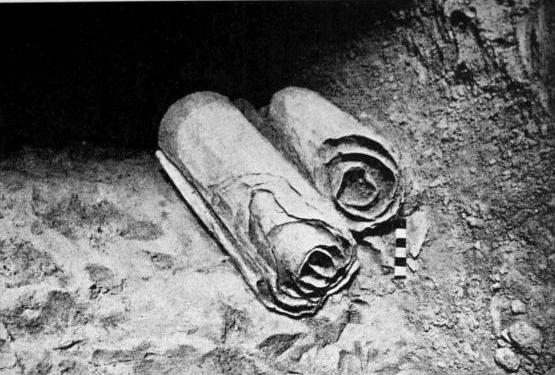
Scrolls in situ

In late 1946 or early 1947, a Bedouin boy of the Ta'amireh tribe, Muhammid Ahmed el-Hamed called edh-Dhib (the wolf), found a cave after searching for a lost animal. He stumbled onto the first cave containing old scrolls. More Ta'amireh visited the cave and scrolls were taken back to their encampment. They were shown to Mar Samuel of the Syriac Orthodox Church in April 1947 who realised their significance and the discovery of the Dead Sea Scrolls was made known. The location of the cave was not revealed for another 18 months, but eventually a joint investigation of the cave site was led by Roland de Vaux and Gerald Lankester Harding from 15 February to 5 March 1949.

The interest in the scrolls with the hope of money from their sale initiated a long area-wide search by the Ta'amireh to find more such scrolls, the first result of which was the discovery of four caves in Wadi Murabba'at about 15 km (9.3 mi) south of Qumran in 1951. In the Qumran area another cave was discovered, now referred to as Cave 2Q (1Q was the first scroll-bearing cave), in February 1952. However, only a few fragments were found in the cave. Fear of the destruction of archaeological evidence with the discovery of caves by the Bedouin led to a campaign by the French and American Schools to explore all other caves to find any remaining scrolls. Although 230 natural caves, crevices and other possible hiding places were examined in an 8-kilometer area along the cliffs near Qumran, only 40 contained any artifacts and one alone, 3Q, produced texts, the most unusual being the Copper Scroll.

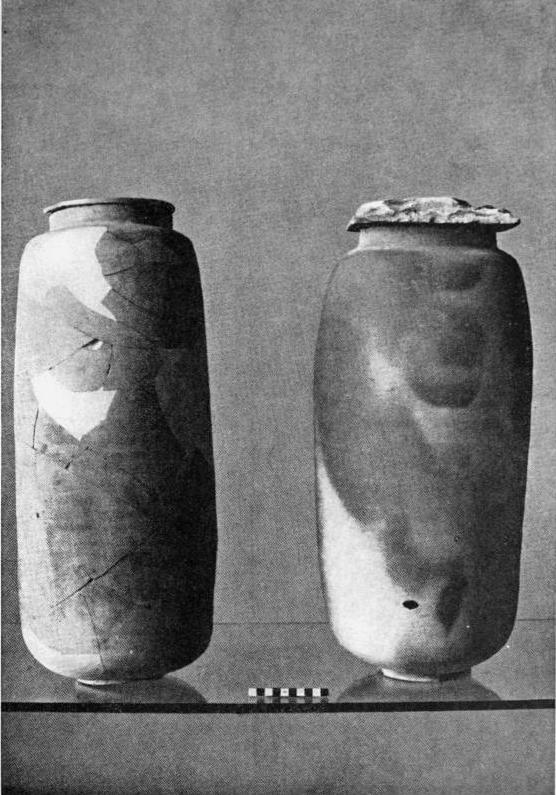
Qumran pottery

4Q was discovered in September 1952 by the Ta'amireh. De Vaux, on being offered a vast amount of fragments, contacted Harding who drove to the Qumran site to find that the Bedouin had discovered caves very near the Qumran ruins. These were Caves 4Q, 5Q, and 6Q, the most important of which was 4Q which originally contained around three-quarters of all the scrolls found in the immediate Qumran area. The first two of these caves had been cut into the marl terrace. The third was at the entrance to the Qumran Gorge just below the aqueduct.

In 1955, a survey of the terrace brought to light a staircase leading down to the remains of three more artificial caves, 7Q, 8Q and 9Q at the end of the Qumran esplanade, all of which had collapsed and had been eroded, and a fourth cave, 10Q, on the outcrop which housed caves 4Q and 5Q.

The last cave containing scrolls to be found, once again by the Ta'amireh, was Qumran Cave 11 (11Q), discovered in early 1956. Among its contents were the Paleo-Hebrew Leviticus scroll, the Great Psalms Scroll, and the Temple Scroll, though the latter had been spirited away and its recovery was to prove long and complex.

In February 2017, the discovery of cave 12Q was announced, the contents of which included completely broken storage jars and scroll fragments, but no scrolls themselves. The cave was investigated by J. Randall Price and students of Liberty University in Virginia, along with an international team of archaeologists from the Hebrew University of Jerusalem in Israel. Iron pickaxe heads from the 1950s were also found, which indicate looting had occurred. In addition, archaeologists discovered pottery, flint blades, arrowheads, and a carnelian seal that date to the Chalcolithic and Neolithic periods.

"This exciting excavation is the closest we’ve come to discovering new Dead Sea scrolls in 60 years. Until now, it was accepted that Dead Sea scrolls were found only in 11 caves at Qumran, but now there is no doubt that this is the 12th cave," reported Dr. Oren Gutfeld, the head of the excavations.

According to Israel Hasson, Director-General of the Israel Antiquities Authority (IAA), the discovery of this cave showed that significant works were waiting to be done in the Judean Desert and some of important ones were waiting to be revealed.

== Artificial caves ==
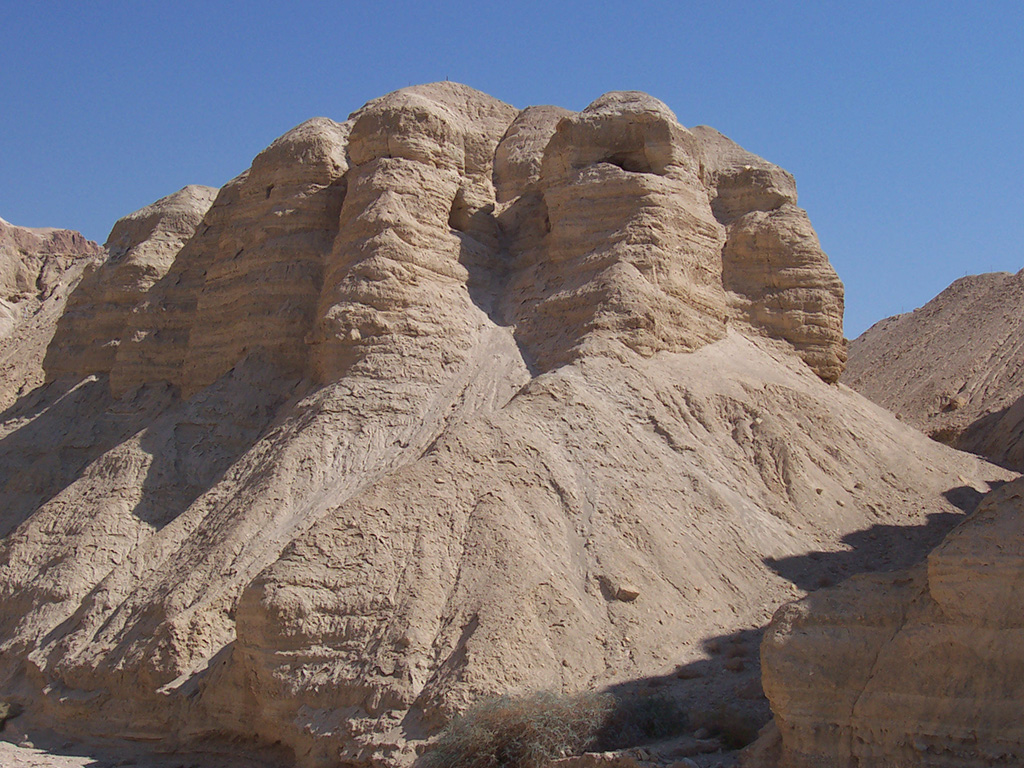
Caves 4Qa right & 10Q left of upper center, seen from Wadi Qumran to the south

In all there are ten marl cut caves in the near vicinity of Qumran: 4Qa, 4Qb, 5Q, 7Q, 8Q, 9Q, 10Q, an oval cave west of 5Q, and two caves to the north in a separate ravine. Their location necessitates a direct connection with the Qumran settlement. The three caves at the end of the esplanade could only be accessed via the settlement. These caves are thought to have been cut for storage and habitation. Marl is a soft stone and makes excavation relatively easy, but as seen with Caves 7Q–9Q they have not survived well.

4Q, which is now visible from the Qumran esplanade, is actually two caves, one adjacent to the other. De Vaux referred to them as 4a and 4b. When the Ta'amireh removed all the fragments they could before Harding's arrival, there was no way to tell which scrolls belonged to which cave, so they were later all catalogued simply as from 4Q. In excavating the caves hundreds of fragments were still to be found in 4a while only two or three fragments in 4b. 4a was 8 m long and 3.25 m wide with tapering walls reaching 3 m in height.

== Archaeological excavations ==
In 1984–1985 Joseph Patrich and Yigael Yadin carried out a systematic survey of over 57 caves north of Qumran and two to the south. In 1985–1991 Patrich excavated five caves, including Caves 3Q and 11Q. One of Patrich's conclusions was that the caves "did not serve as habitations for the members of the Dead Sea Sect, but rather as stores and hiding places".

It was discovered that under the rocks in Cave 3Q there were only a few Chalcolithic sherds, showing that the ceiling had collapsed before any Qumran-era occupation. The cave was uninhabited and used only to store the scrolls left there.

In 1988 in the cave Patrich designated as Cave 13, just north of 3Q, a small juglet was found from the Herodian era, which was wrapped in palm fibres and contained a viscous liquid which Patrich presumed was aromatic balsam residue. In 1991 he discovered several jar stoppers and a complete jar along with date stones and dry dates suggesting occupation, but as the area in front of the cave showed no attempt to convert it into a terrace, he concluded that occupation was not of any length.

11Q was examined and no traces of Qumran era occupation was found. A cave Patrich called Cave 24, which lay between 11Q and 3Q, was large and habitable, but showed no sign of long-term habitation. Cave FQ37 (named in the 1952 survey) located high up on the cliff face 2 kilometers south of Qumran was also an improbable site for permanent dwelling, due to its inaccessibility.

In late 1995 and early 1996, Magen Broshi and Hanan Eshel carried out further excavations in the caves north of Qumran. They reported other caves not examined by Patrich and believed that they served as dwellings for the inhabitants of Qumran along with other artificial caves that have long ago eroded away from the edge of the marl terrace.

Broshi and Eshel concentrated their interest in the area just north of Qumran, examining two caves they designated as C and F in a small ravine. The former had part of its ceiling caved in and was filled with silt from flash floods, but contained 280 potsherds. Cave F had completely collapsed, but when excavated yielded 110 potsherds. They concluded that the area was residential.

Two other archaeological sites from the same time period, Ein Feshkha, and Ain el-Ghuweir, both located south of Qumran along the shore of the Dead Sea, are also often linked with Qumran.

Isaiah scroll discovered at Qumran

== See also ==
- Shrine of the Book
- Rockefeller Museum
- Antiquities trade
