= Great Psalms Scroll =

Ancient religious manuscript found in 1956 in the Qumran area

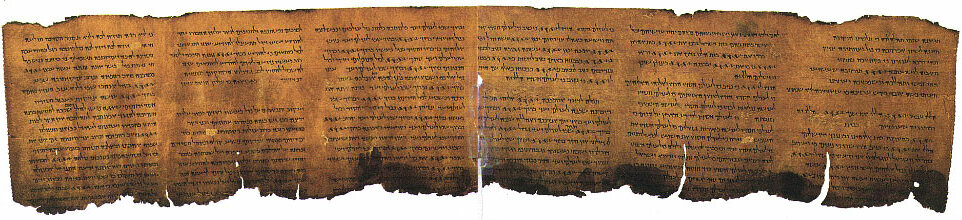
The Great Psalms Scroll

The Great Psalms Scroll, also referred to as 11Q5, is the most substantial and well preserved manuscript of Psalms of the thirty-seven discovered among the Dead Sea Scrolls in the Qumran caves. It is one of six Psalms manuscripts discovered in Cave 11.

== Description ==
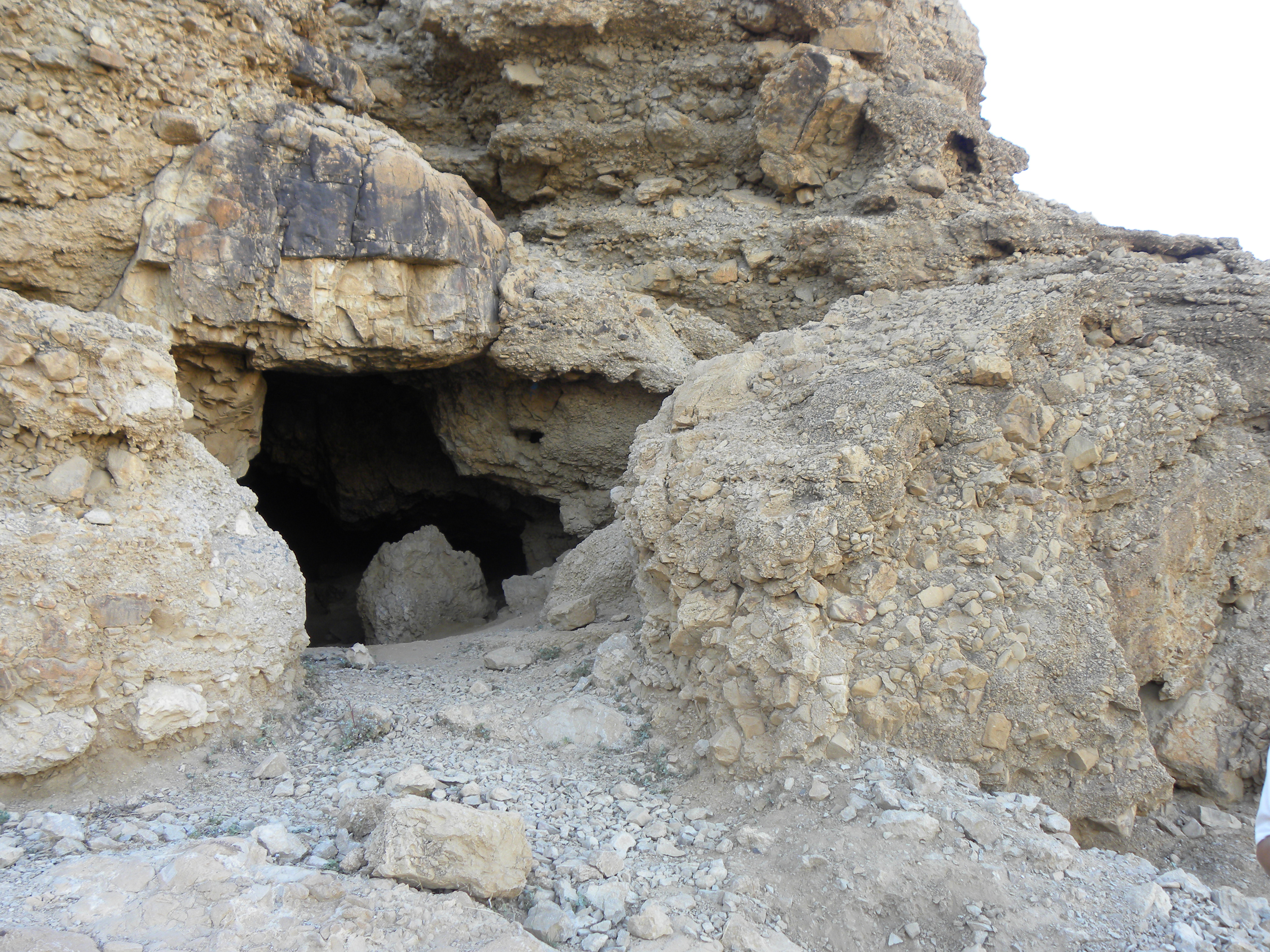
Qumran Cave 11 Entrance

The scroll was discovered in February 1956, ten years after the initial discovery of the scrolls. It was purchased by the Palestine Archaeological Museum, located in Jerusalem, and first unrolled in November 1961. Four fragments of this scroll were later purchased by the same museum. The scroll's physical make up is that of dark yellow animal hide and is a little less than 1 mm thick. The primary body of the manuscript consists of "5 sheets of leather, still sewn together", and is 4.253 meters in length. It is estimated to have been copied anywhere from 30-50 AD, and is written in Biblical style Hebrew. When rolled out, it forms a slight arc, and the top part is clean and well kept, while the bottom is decomposing significantly. It was first edited and published by James A. Sanders in 1965, with a second volume also published by Sanders two years later with a wider and more general audience in mind. The full scroll is published in the Leon Levy Dead Sea Scrolls Digital Library.

== Shape and content of the 11Q5 Psalter ==
The reason this manuscript is of such great interest to scholars is due to its major deviance from the Masoretic Psalter, "both in ordering of contents and in the presence of additional compositions". Its textual makeup is that of "apocryphal compositions interspersed with canonical psalms in a radically different order". It contains approximately fifty compositions, forty of which are found in the Masoretic text. While some maintain the masoretic order, such as some of the Psalms of Ascent, others are scattered throughout in a different order.

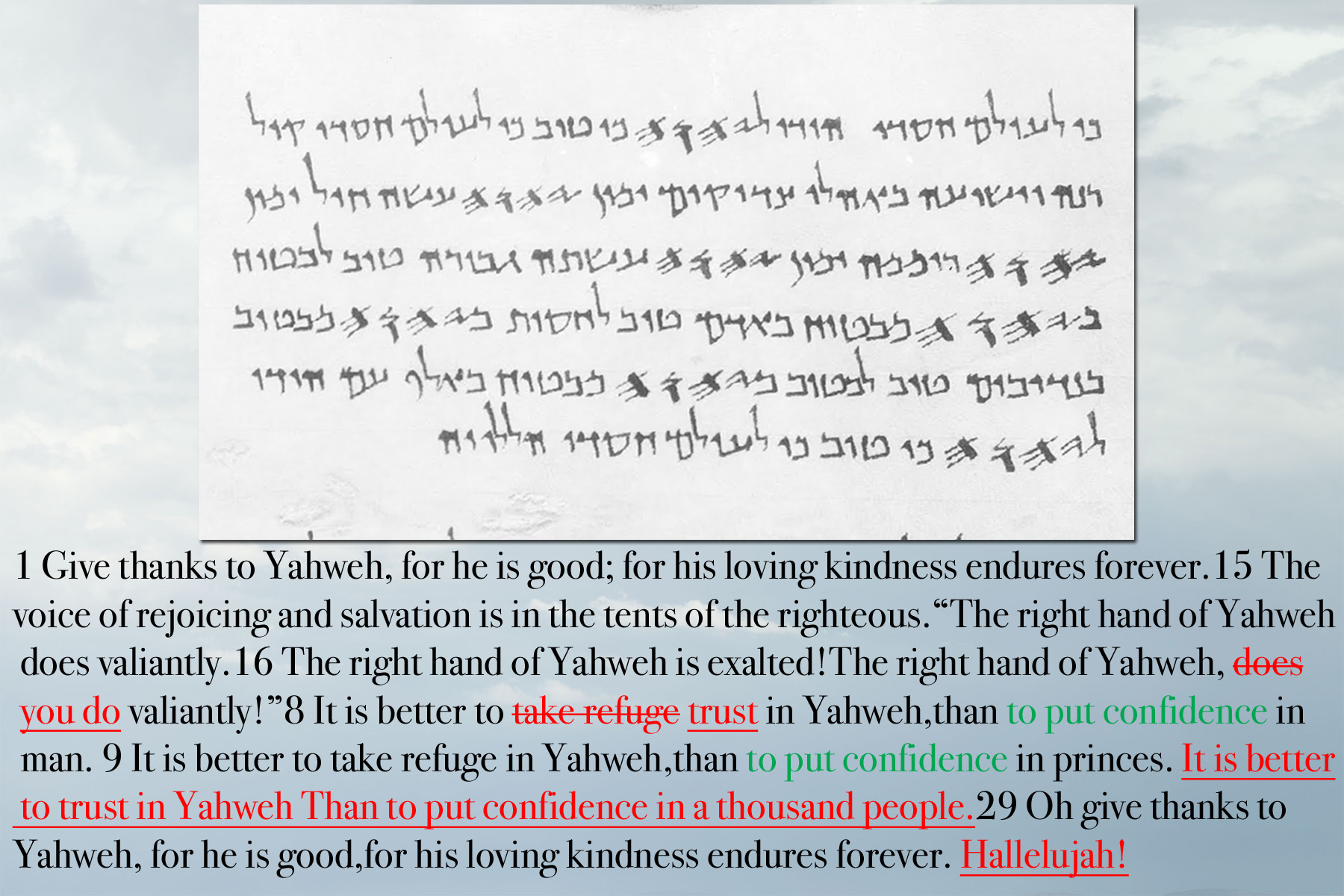
Psalm 118 in the 11Q5 Manuscript

It contains several compositions that are not present in the Masoretic Psalter of 150 hymns and prayers and therefore, "challenges traditional ideas concerning the shape and finalization of the book of Psalms". There are eight non-Masoretic compositions with an additional prose composition that is not formatted like a psalm. Three highlighted compositions include "The Apostrophe to Zion", "Plea for Deliverance", and Psalm 151; in addition, the prose composition is researched to be known as "David's Compositions". While these are non-Masoretic, one of them, Psalm 151, was known in the Septuagint.

The Apostrophe to Zion, written as a love poem to Zion, is one of two non-Masoretic compositions that are complete in the Great Psalm Scroll. It has the "same style as three biblical apostrophes in Isaiah 54:1-8, 60:1-22, 62:1-8" and another copy of this composition can be found in 4Q88.

The Plea for Deliverance, found in column 19, was a psalm unknown before the discovery of 11Q5, where neither the beginning nor the end of the poem can be found, except some twelve lines of the same psalm found in 11Q6. It is a prayer for deliverance from sin and Satan, giving thanks for experiences in the past while using biblical vocabulary, style, and form. Scholars have found it very difficult to date this psalm.

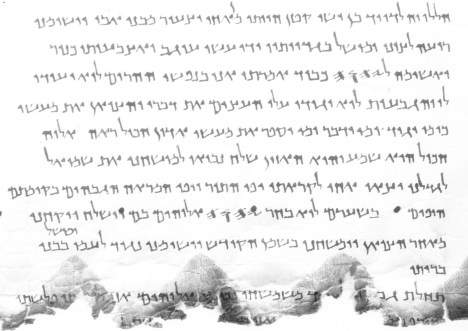
Psalm 151 in the 11Q5 Manuscript.

The traditional Hebrew Bible and the Book of Psalms contains 150 psalms, but Psalm 151 is found both in The Great Psalms Scroll and the Septuagint, as both end with this psalm. Scholars have found it fascinating having both the Greek and Hebrew translation of this psalm, helping to understand the different techniques of the different translators. However, the Septuagint version is short and sparse with only one composition of 7 verses, whereas 11Q5 has two compositions. Psalm 151A and 151B (Hebrew) and 151 (Greek) are the only psalms considered to be autobiographical in terms of relating to events in David's life. The version of Psalm 151 discovered at Qumran adopts a more biographical tone, giving it the sound of a hymn associated with the figure of David.

The additional prose composition is also known as David's Compositions. It references many Psalms associated with David, including 364 songs for each day of the year, conforming to calendars found in distinctively sectarian texts among the Dead Sea Scrolls. These songs were hymns attributed to King David, praising him for composing the Psalms, classifying the hymns and prayers he wrote. According to this list, David composed 3,600 psalms, 364 songs to be performed each day of the year during regular sacrifices, another 52 songs for the weekly Sabbath sacrifice, 30 songs for sacrifices of annual festivals and the new moon, and 4 songs for the sick. Therefore, 11Q5 concludes with the bold statement that David was an avid sage and hymnist, crafting upwards of 4,050 psalms.

== Status at Qumran ==
There are many theories as to the function and status of the 11Q5 scroll at Qumran. In that it varies so much from the Masoretic Psalter, the general consensus seems to be that the Psalter canon had not been entirely fixed at this point and that this manuscript was part of a more "living corpus". However, various theories, including those of James A. Sanders, M. H. Goshen-Gottstein, Patrick Skehan and Peter Flint, argue for different purposes or functions of the scroll.

James Sanders proposed that this manuscript contained an arrangement created prior to the fixation of the Masoretic Psalter of 150 Psalms. He thought that the first half of the Masoretic Psalter, Psalm 1-89, had been finalized but that the second half, while still considered canonical at Qumran, was quite fluid. In contrast, M. H. Goshen-Gottstein proposed that the scroll is a secondary liturgical collection based on the already standardized Masoretic Psalter. Patrick W. Skehan also argued that it is a secondary collection grouped for liturgical purposes. Peter Flint suggested that the scroll is a collection of 52 psalms, in correlation with the 52 weeks of the solar calendar, with 4 extra pieces arguing David's authorship.

Due to the large number of Psalms scrolls found at Qumran and the references to the Psalms in other sectarian works, there is formal and functional evidence suggesting that the Psalms were viewed as scripture by the Qumran community and that the strong Davidic emphasis in this particular scroll correlates with the community's messianic hopes and expectations.
