= James A. Sanders =

American biblical scholar and translator (1927–2020)

James A. Sanders (28 November 1927 in Memphis, Tennessee – 1 October 2020) was an American scholar of the Old Testament/Hebrew Bible and one of the Dead Sea Scrolls editors. Sanders grew up in racially segregated Memphis, attended a Methodist church, and went to Nashville to attend Vanderbilt University where he associated with Baptist & Methodist fellowships. He was the first to translate and edit the Psalm Scroll, which contained a previously unknown psalm. Sanders retired in the late 1990s, but published and lectured regularly into his 90s.

Sanders taught at Union Theological Seminary in New York, NY and at the Claremont School of Theology, Claremont, CA. While at CST, he founded the Ancient Biblical Manuscript Center for Research and Preservation (ABMC), a photographic, microfilm, and later digital, library and research center for ancient and medieval manuscripts related to the Bible. He had a falling-out with Elizabeth Bechtel the Center founder.

In his retirement, Sanders taught at the Episcopal Theological School at Claremont, a denominational seminary hosted on the Claremont School of Theology campus, as well as lecturing widely. In 2010, Sanders was made an honorary canon of the Cathedral Center of St. Paul in the Episcopal Diocese of Los Angeles in recognition of his service to the Episcopal Church (United States).

== Selected bibliography ==
- The Rebirth of a Born-Again Christian. A Memoir. Eugene, OR: Cascade Books, 2017. ISBN 1532607067
- The Monotheizing Process: Its Origins and Its Developments. Eugene, OR: Cascade Books, 2014.
- Torah and Canon, 2d ed. Eugene, OR: Cascade Books, 2005
- Early Christian Interpretation of the Scriptures of Israel: Investigations and Proposals, ed. with Craig A. Evans, Sheffield: The Academic Press, 1997
- Paul and the Scriptures of Israel, with Craig Evans, JSOT Press, 1993
- Luke and Scripture: The Function of Sacred Tradition in Luke–Acts, with Craig Evans, Fortress Press, 1993
- Canon and Community: a Guide to Canonical Criticism, Fortress Press, 1984
- Torah and Canon, Fortress Press, 1972
- From Sacred Story to Sacred Text, Fortress Press 1987

== See also ==
- Hebrew Old Testament Text Project
