= Temple Scroll =

Ancient Jewish text

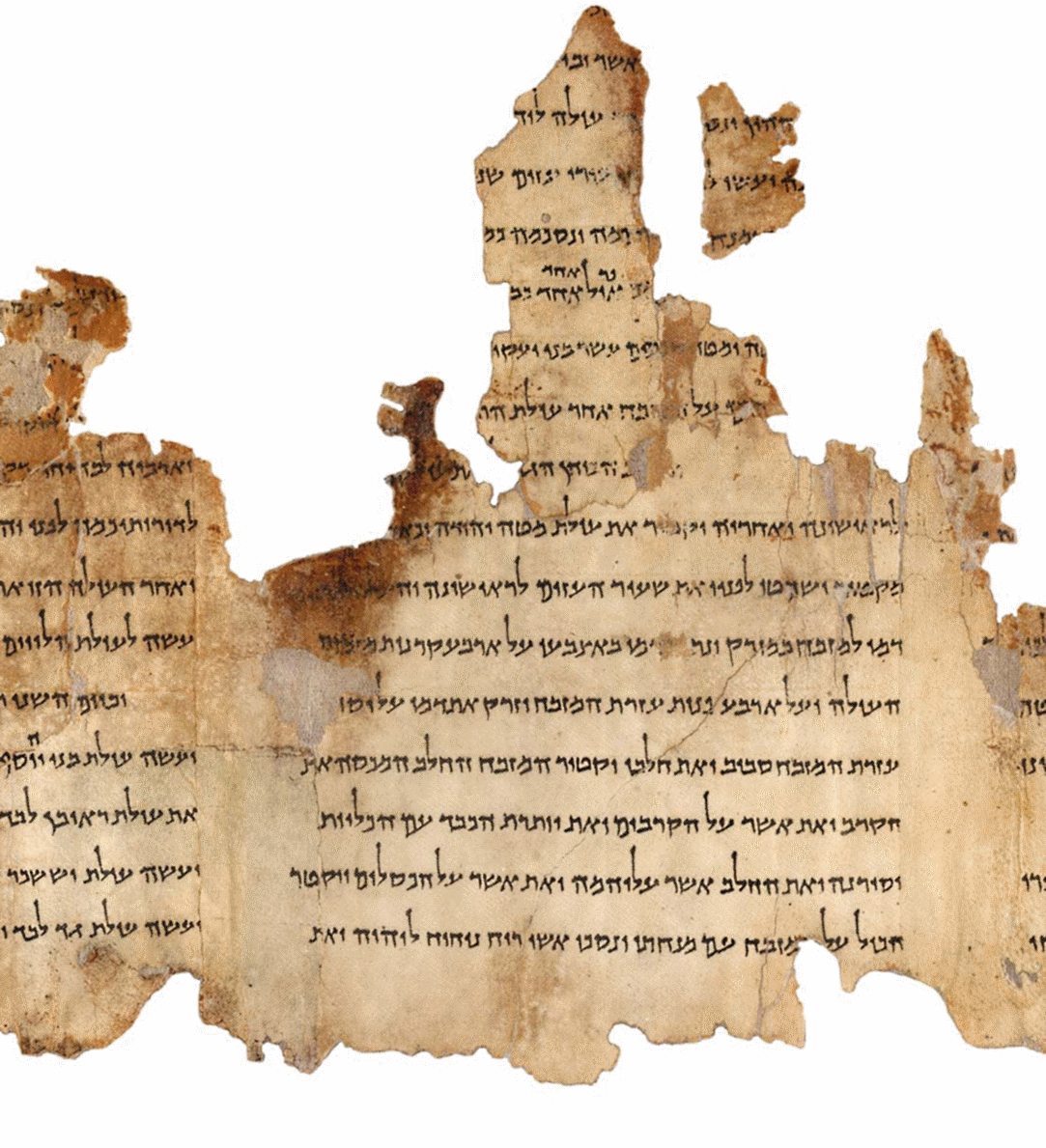
Portion of the Temple Scroll

The Temple Scroll (Hebrew: מגילת המקדש) is the longest of the Dead Sea Scrolls. Among the discoveries at Qumran it is designated: 11QTemple Scroll^{a} (11Q19 [11QT^{a}]). It describes a Jewish temple, along with extensive detailed regulations about sacrifices and temple practices. The document is written in the form of a revelation from God to Moses, thereby with the intended meaning that this is the more appropriate temple which was revealed to Moses, and that Moses' instructions were either forgotten or ignored when Solomon built the First Temple in Jerusalem. In other words, in the mind of the Scroll writer, "Solomon should actually have built the First Temple as it is described here in the Temple Scroll".

== Introduction ==
The Temple Scroll is written in Hebrew in the square Herodian script of the late Second Temple Period, and comprises 65 columns (19 pieces of leather) and is 9 metres in length. The outer part of the scroll sustained considerable damage over the many centuries with the consequence that Columns 2 to 14 have many missing words and phrases. From Column 15 onward the inner part of the scroll is better preserved.

Most of the text is a reworking of biblical material (mostly from Exodus chapter 34 to Deuteronomy chapter 23), although not in the same order as given in the Hebrew Bible; sometimes it combines different biblical texts to present a novel view and there are parts that are non-biblical but which are presented using biblical phraseology. Spelling of words often differs from the Masoretic Text, with an occasional word added to the biblical narrative and its frequent use of plene scriptum.

There is no scholarly consensus regarding the date, origin, author or authors, or its relationship to the Qumran community. Some scholars attribute the Temple Scroll to the isolated Qumran community, while others see no connection with the Qumran community; instead they see the work as a priestly (possible Zadokite) document which was hidden in a cave by Zealots during their flight from Jerusalem in 70 CE before the Roman destruction of the Temple.

Using X-rays, samples from the scroll showed that the fragments have a ratio of chlorine to bromine about three times higher than found in sea water, and researchers conclude that the parchment of the scroll may have been made using Dead Sea water.

== An idealized temple ==
The scroll describes a Temple compound arranged in three concentric square courts resembling the Israelites camp in the desert during their exodus from Egypt to the promised land. An idealized "four square" Temple plan is presented in the Temple Scroll. Johann Maier calculated that the scroll dimensions of the three inner courts are:

- Inner Court 280 cubits × 280 cubits (300 × 300 outer square)
- Middle Court 480 cubits × 480 cubits (500 × 500 outer square)
- Outer Court approximately 1,600 cubits × 1,600 cubits [Contra Yadin, whose scheme of the outer court measurements are 294 × 294, 480 × 480, 1,590 × 1,590 (or 1,600 × 1,600).]

The sacrificial regulations of Exodus, Leviticus and Deuteronomy are blended and united into one cohesive unit for the ideal Temple. The dimensions of the Temple are much larger than the Solomonic First Temple, probably reflecting the significantly larger population whose needs must be met. This clearly means that the Scroll pre-dates the dramatic expansions of the Second Temple (sometimes referred to as Herod's Temple) which Herod the Great instituted to meet those same needs which had been generated by significant population growth.

The four equal sides to the proposed temple find an earlier model in Ezekiel's temple (Ezekiel chapters 40–47).

The Temple Scroll describes a temple, beginning with the inner sanctum, also known as the Holy of Holies, and working outwards. The first court is reserved for the priests, the second court is "the area for cultically qualified men" and the third is "the area for ritually pure Israelites."

== The theme of purity (holiness) in the Temple Scroll ==
=== Purity before 200 BCE ===
The above-mentioned outline of the three courts, beginning with the holiest place and working outward into less and less pure areas highlights the theme of purity in the Scroll, though the writer makes it abundantly clear that an extremely high level of purity is required even to enter the city at all, as can be seen further along on this page.

The call to purity has been a part of Israel's existence from early times, as evidenced in the Pentateuch/Torah and in many of the biblical prophets, both major and minor. This call was voiced very powerfully in Jeremiah and Ezekiel in the years just before the destruction of the First Temple (also known as Solomon's Temple) in 586 BCE and by Ezekiel and others in the years shortly afterward. The return of some Jewish people to Jerusalem (c. 535 BCE) following their exile in Babylonia resulted in tensions over the issue of purity, as they sought to keep themselves distinct from the local people they found living in Judah. Many other Jewish people remained in Babylonia where they faced the challenge of keeping themselves and their culture distinct and alive (see Jewish Diaspora).

=== Purity in the Temple Scroll ===
The Temple Scroll demands an extraordinary level of purity in all who draw near the Temple because of the holiness radiating from it. In drawing close to the Temple, to protect the holiness, greater degrees of cleanliness are mandated in the form of purity laws. The purity laws are more stringent than those of the Pentateuch, which was mainly concerned with keeping the wilderness camp of the sojourning Israelites pure. The Temple Scroll does not appear to make provision for permanent habitation of the Temple city, but envisions temporary residents that come from other cities for festivals and religious rites.

Columns 48 to 51 list sources of impurity and the steps needed to become clean again.

Anyone who lies with his wife and has an ejaculation, for three days shall not enter anywhere in the city of the temple in which I shall install my name.

Such statements go beyond the requirements of Torah, Mishnah or Talmud, and imply that sexual intercourse is not to be permitted at all inside the city where the new Temple will stand. A similar regulation is found in the Damascus Document (also found at Qumran) Dead Sea Scrolls Document Ref. No. CD-A]:

...it is holy. No man should sleep with his wife in the city of the temple, defiling the city of the temple with their impurity. (Damascus Document CD-A, Column 12 (XII) verses 1 & 2)

The holiness extends out from the inner court of the Temple to encompass not only the other two temple courts, but takes in the entire city. These two latter passages also reveal a strong connection between the Temple Scroll and the Damascus Document.

== Festivals in the Temple Scroll ==
Textual evidence indicates that the text for the festivals comes from another work and was incorporated into the Temple Scroll, which lists festivals that should be celebrated throughout the year; many of the festivals are mentioned in the Bible including those found in Numbers 28–29, and Leviticus 23, but some are unique including the annual festival for priestly ordination. In contrast to the single Biblical festival of First Fruits (grains), the Temple Scroll calls for four First Fruit festivals:

- First day of the First Month Festival (1 Nissan).
- Feast of the First Fruits of Wine (3 Av)
- Feast of the New Oil (22 Elul)
- Feast of the Wood Offering (23 Elul)

== Sacrificial regulations and practices ==
The Temple Scroll reveals a rather detailed awareness of temple sacrifices right down to precise details about animals and the sacrificial practice. An example of this precision is Column 15, beginning at verse 5:

[You shall offer to Hashem the right leg,] holocaust of the ram, and [the fat which covers the entrails,] the two kidneys and the fat which is on them, [the fat which is on] the loins and the [whole] tail, cut off at the coccyx, and the lobe of the liver, and its offering and its libation, according to the regulation. You shall take up a cake of unleavened bread from the basket and a cake of oiled bread and a wafer, [and you shall place it all on top of the fat] with the leg of the wave-offering, the right leg.

The Temple Scroll has many similar passages. This particular passage is about the annual consecration of temple priests and is derived from Leviticus 8:16 and Exodus 29:1–18. In passage after passage the writer of the Scroll reveals a familiarity with countless aspects of temple sacrificial offerings, leading one to the conclusion that he had either actually been present (and perhaps an active participant in) sacrifices in the Second Temple, or at the very least had a very thorough awareness of both written (Pentateuch/Torah) and oral sources of information regarding Jewish sacrificial practice. Johann Maier seems to favour the latter when he states:

... since Biblical passages (dealing with festivals and sacrifices) have been woven together, they should not be treated first and foremost as textual witnesses but rather as modified and adapted Biblical material.

In other respects, the Temple Scroll brings down an 'oral tradition' regarding the beautiful captive woman (Deuteronomy 21:10–13) for which there is no parallel in the Mishnah, Tosefta, Sifre, Talmud or other rabbinic writings.

... and of the things belonging to you, she shall not touch what is hallowed until seven years [have transpired], neither shall she eat of the sacrificial peace-offerings until seven years have passed, afterwards she shall eat.

Maier claims that "a distinct closeness to the Greek translation (the Septuagint) can at times be detected". A strong priestly influence is obvious in the Scroll, whether it originated in Qumran itself or in Jerusalem.
